= John VII of Mecklenburg-Schwerin =

John VII
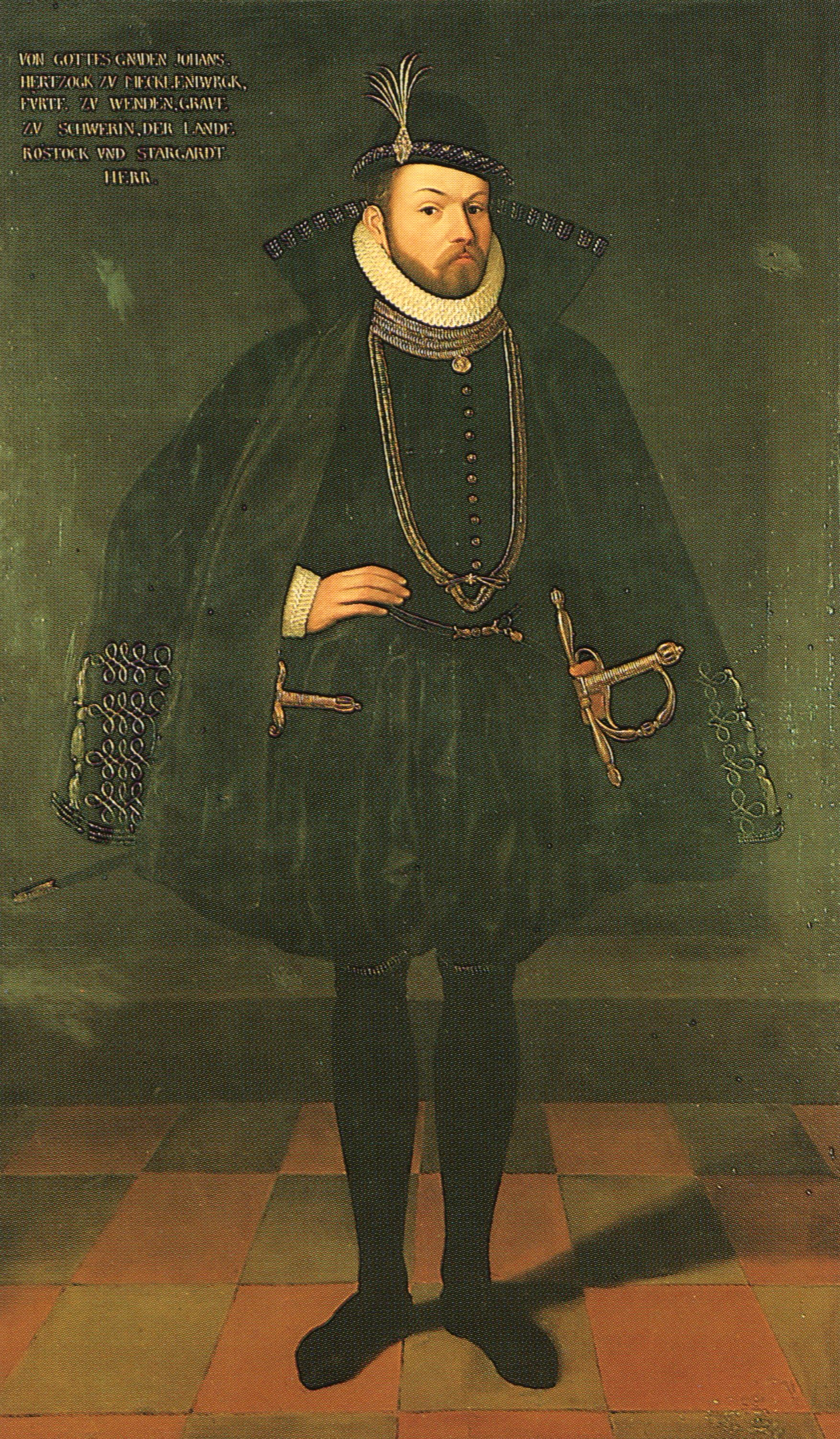
- Portrait by Theodor Fischer, mid-19th century

Duke of Mecklenburg-Schwerin
- Reign: 12 February 1576 - 22 March 1592
- Predecessor: John Albert I
- Successor: Adolf Frederick I
- Born: 7 March 1558; Güstrow
- Died: 22 March 1592 (aged 34); Stargard
- Burial: Schwerin Cathedral
- Spouse: Sophia of Schleswig-Holstein-Gottorp (m. 1588)
- Issue: Adolf Frederick I John Albert II
- House: House of Mecklenburg
- Father: John Albert I, Duke of Mecklenburg-Güstrow and Schwerin
- Mother: Anna Sophia of Prussia

John VII (German: Johann; 7 March 1558 – 22 March 1592), sometimes called John V, was a Duke of Mecklenburg-Schwerin.

== Biography ==
Johann was the son of John Albert I, Duke of Mecklenburg-Güstrow and Schwerin (1525–1576), and his wife Duchess Anna Sophia of Prussia (1527–1591). He was eighteen years old when his father died. A regency council was appointed that ruled in his name for the next nine years.

The regency handed over the actual rule of his territories to him in 1585. He immediately faced problems he was ill-equipped to deal with, including massive debt and his uncle Christopher's demands for territorial concessions. After an especially harsh argument with his uncle, he committed suicide.

Since suicides could not be buried in hallowed ground, a story was concocted which alleged that Johann had been killed by the devil as part of a pact with two women from Schwerin. The women were questioned: Katharina Wankelmuth, who died from the effects of torture, and Magdalena Rukitz, who was burned at the stake. Their condemnation as witches cleared the way for Johann's burial in Schwerin Cathedral.

== Marriage and children ==
On 17 February 1588 Johann married Sophia (1 June 1569 – 14 November 1634), a daughter of Adolf, Duke of Holstein-Gottorp, and his wife Christine of Hesse. They had three children:

- Adolf Frederick I (15 December 1588 – 27 February 1658)
- John Albert II (5 May 1590 – 23 April 1636)
- Anna Sophia (19 September 1591 – 11 February 1648)

== Ancestry ==
Ancestors of John VII of Mecklenburg-Schwerin

8. Magnus II, Duke of Mecklenburg
4. Albrecht VII, Duke of Mecklenburg
9. Sophie of Pomerania
2. John Albert I, Duke of Mecklenburg
10. Joachim I, Elector of Brandenburg
5. Anna of Brandenburg
11. Elizabeth of Denmark
1. John VII, Duke of Mecklenburg
12. Frederick I, Margrave of Brandenburg-Ansbach
6. Albert, Duke of Prussia
13. Sophia Jagiellon
3. Anna Sophia of Prussia
14. Frederick I of Denmark
7. Dorothea of Denmark
15. Anna of Brandenburg
