= Anna Sophia of Prussia =

Duchess consort of Mecklenburg

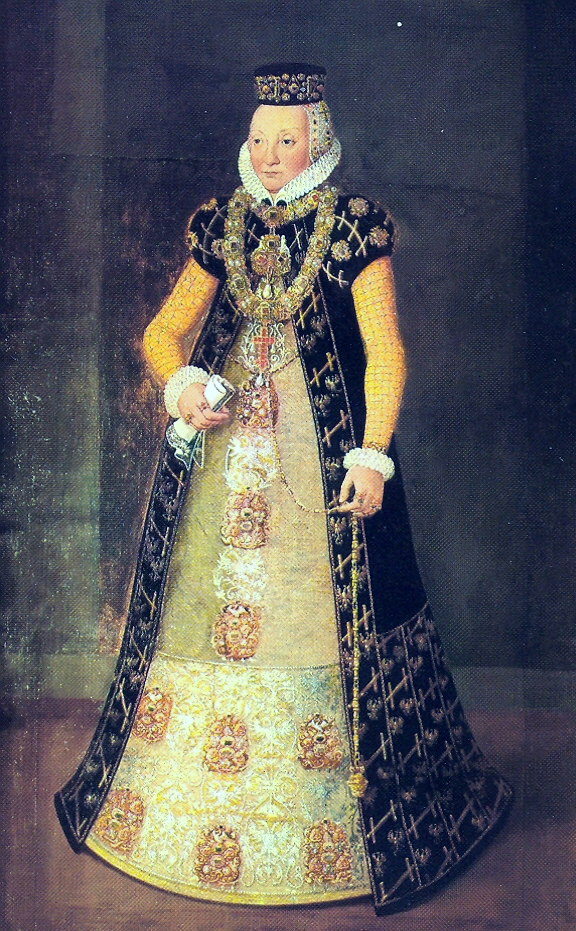
- Anna Sophia of Prussia, Duchess of Mecklenburg
- Born: 11 June 1527; Königsberg
- Died: 6 February 1591 (aged 63); Lübz
- Buried: Schwerin Cathedral
- Noble family: House of Hohenzollern
- Spouse: John Albert I, Duke of Mecklenburg
- Issue: John VII, Duke of Mecklenburg-Schwerin
- Father: Albert, Duke in Prussia
- Mother: Dorothea of Denmark

Anna Sophia of Prussia (11 June 1527 – 6 February 1591) was Duchess of Mecklenburg by marriage to John Albert I, Duke of Mecklenburg.

== Life ==
Anna Sophie was born in Königsberg, the oldest and only surviving child of Duke Albert of Prussia (1490-1568) from his first marriage with Dorothea (1504-1547), a daughter of King Frederick I of Denmark. From her mother, she received an extensive education in naturopathy and gynecology. Already in 1546, the estates of Prussia agreed to a so-called "dowry tax" to provide the dowry of 30000 guilders she would receive when she married.

She married on 24 February 1555 in Wismar to Duke John Albert I of Mecklenburg (1525-1576). As a wedding gift, her father mediated in a dispute between her husband and his brother Ulrich, Duke of Mecklenburg. On the occasion of his marriage, Duke John Albert I had the Fürstenhof Palace in Wismar remodeled in a Renaissance style. After the wedding, John Albert I and his bride moved into this palace.

John Albert I and Anna Sophia had three sons; she was described as a loving mother. John Albert I remained a loyal ally to his father-in-law, in the Holy Roman Empire as well as in Livonia. Duke Albert attempted several times, unsuccessfully, to make John Albert I his heir and successor in the Duchy of Prussia.

After John Albert I died in 1576, Anna Sophia retired to her Wittum in Lübz, where she died in 1591. She was buried in Schwerin Cathedral.

== Issue ==
Anna Sophia and her husband had three sons:

- Albert (1556–1561), titular Duke of Mecklenburg
- John VII (1558-1592), ruling Duke of Mecklenburg-Schwerin from 1576 to 1592, married in 1588 to Duchess Sophia of Holstein-Gottorp (1569-1634)
- Sigismund August, (1560–1600), titular Duke of Mecklenburg, married in 1593 to Duchess Maria Clara of Pomerania-Barth (1574-1623)
