= John of Mecklenburg =

John of Mecklenburg may refer to:

- John I, Duke of Mecklenburg (1326–1392/93)
- Johann VII, Duke of Mecklenburg-Schwerin (1558–1592)
