= Albrecht VII of Mecklenburg =

Albrecht VII
- Duke of Mecklenburg
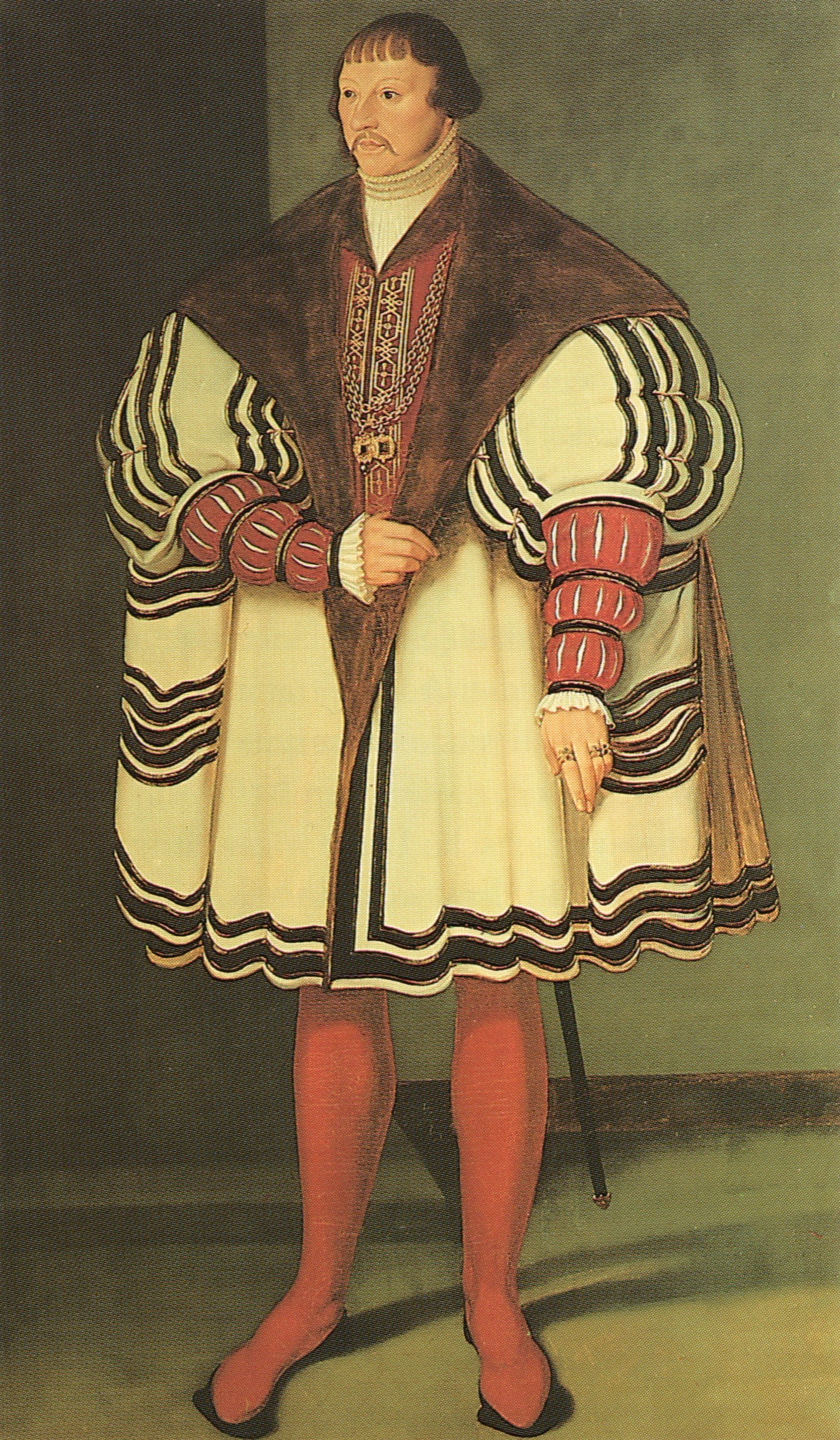
- 19th-century portrait of Albrecht VII by Theodor Fischer
- Born: 25 July 1486
- Died: 5 January 1547 (aged 60)
- Burial: Doberan Minster
- Spouse: Anna of Brandenburg (m. 1524)
- Issue: Magnus of Mecklenburg; John Albert I, Duke of Mecklenburg-Güstrow; Ulrich III, Duke of Mecklenburg-Güstrow; George of Mecklenburg; Anna, Duchess of Courland; Louis of Mecklenburg; John of Mecklenburg; Christopher, Duke of Mecklenburg-Gadebusch; Sophie of Mecklenburg; Charles I, Duke of Mecklenburg
- House: Mecklenburg-Schwerin
- Father: Magnus II, Duke of Mecklenburg
- Mother: Sophie of Pomerania-Wolgast

Albrecht VII, the Handsome, Duke of Mecklenburg in Güstrow (25 July 1486 – 5 January 1547), was a minor ruler in North Germany of the 16th century. He also asserted claims to Scandinavian thrones based on the royal lineage of the House of Mecklenburg.

In the course of the so-called Count's Feud, the Free City of Lübeck involved Duke Albrecht in its alliance with various parties and offered him the Danish crown. King Christian III of Denmark, however, managed to keep his kingdom: Christopher, Count of Oldenburg, and Duke Albert were besieged in Copenhagen in 1535–1536 until they capitulated.

== Marriage and children ==
On 17 January 1524 he married Anna of Brandenburg, a daughter of Joachim I, Elector of Brandenburg. They had the following children:

- Magnus of Mecklenburg (born and died 19 November 1524)
- John Albert I, Duke of Mecklenburg-Güstrow (23 December 1525 – 12 February 1576)
- Ulrich III, Duke of Mecklenburg-Güstrow and Schwerin (21 April 1528 – 14 March 1603)
- George of Mecklenburg (22 February 1529 – 20 July 1552),
- Anna of Mecklenburg (14 October 1533 – 4 July 1602); married Gotthard Kettler, Duke of Courland, and had issue.
- Louis of Mecklenburg (1535–1535)
- John of Mecklenburg (1536–1536)
- Christopher, Duke of Mecklenburg-Gadebusch (30 June 1537 – 4 March 1592); married in 1573 to Dorothea (1528 – 11 November 1575), daughter of Frederick I of Denmark and on 14 May 1581 to Princess Elizabeth of Sweden (5 April 1549 – 20 November 1597)
- Sophie of Mecklenburg (10 April 1538 – 1538)
- Charles I, Duke of Mecklenburg-Güstrow and Schwerin (28 September 1540 – 22 July 1610)

== Literature ==
- Lutz Sellmer, Albrecht VII. von Mecklenburg und die Grafenfehde (1534-1536), Frankfurt am Main 1999.
- Heinz Maybaum (1953). "Albrecht VII.". Neue Deutsche Biographie (in German). Vol. 1. Berlin: Duncker & Humblot. pp. 167–168. (full text online).

Albrecht VII of Mecklenburg House of Mecklenburg-Schwerin Cadet branch of the House of Mecklenburg Born: 25 July 1486 Died: 5 January 1547
Regnal titles
Preceded by Magnus II	Dukes of Mecklenburg; 1503–1520 with Henry V (1503–1520); Eric II (1503–1508)	Succeeded by himself as Duke of Mecklenburg-Güstrow
Preceded by Magnus II	Dukes of Mecklenburg; 1503–1520 with Henry V (1503–1520); Eric II (1503–1508)	Succeeded by Henry V as Duke of Mecklenburg-Schwerin
Preceded by himself and Henry V as Dukes of Mecklenburg	Duke of Mecklenburg-Güstrow; 1520–1547	Succeeded by John Albert I
