= Humfray Cole =

English maker of scientific instruments and engraver

Humfray Cole (died 1591) was an English maker of scientific instruments and engraver.

== Life ==
Cole was, according to his own description, a native of the north of England. From his employment at the mint and the general character of his work he appears to have been a mechanician. Edward Dyer acted as his patron, and he was commended as artisan by Gabriel Harvey.

For the second edition of the Bishops' Bible, published in 1572, he engraved a map of Palestine, as Canaan, thought to be based on a 1557 map by Tilemann Stella or Stoltz. On it he describes himself as "Humfray Cole, goldsmith, an Englishman born in ye north and pertayning to ye Mint in the Tower, 1572."

Poorly paid at the mint, Cole took outside commissions; he undertook to supply any of the instruments shown in the 1571 Pantometria of Leonard Digges and Thomas Digges. He supplied instruments to Martin Frobisher. He was employed in engraving mathematical and astronomical instruments in brass, of which there are specimens in the British Museum. One of these is an astrolabe, at one time in the possession of Henry Frederick, Prince of Wales. He also made an armillary sphere. James Gregory purchased examples of Cole's work in London in 1673, for the University of St Andrews.

William Bourne also mentions Cole as an innovator in the design of a ship's log.
