= Charles I of Mecklenburg =

Charles I
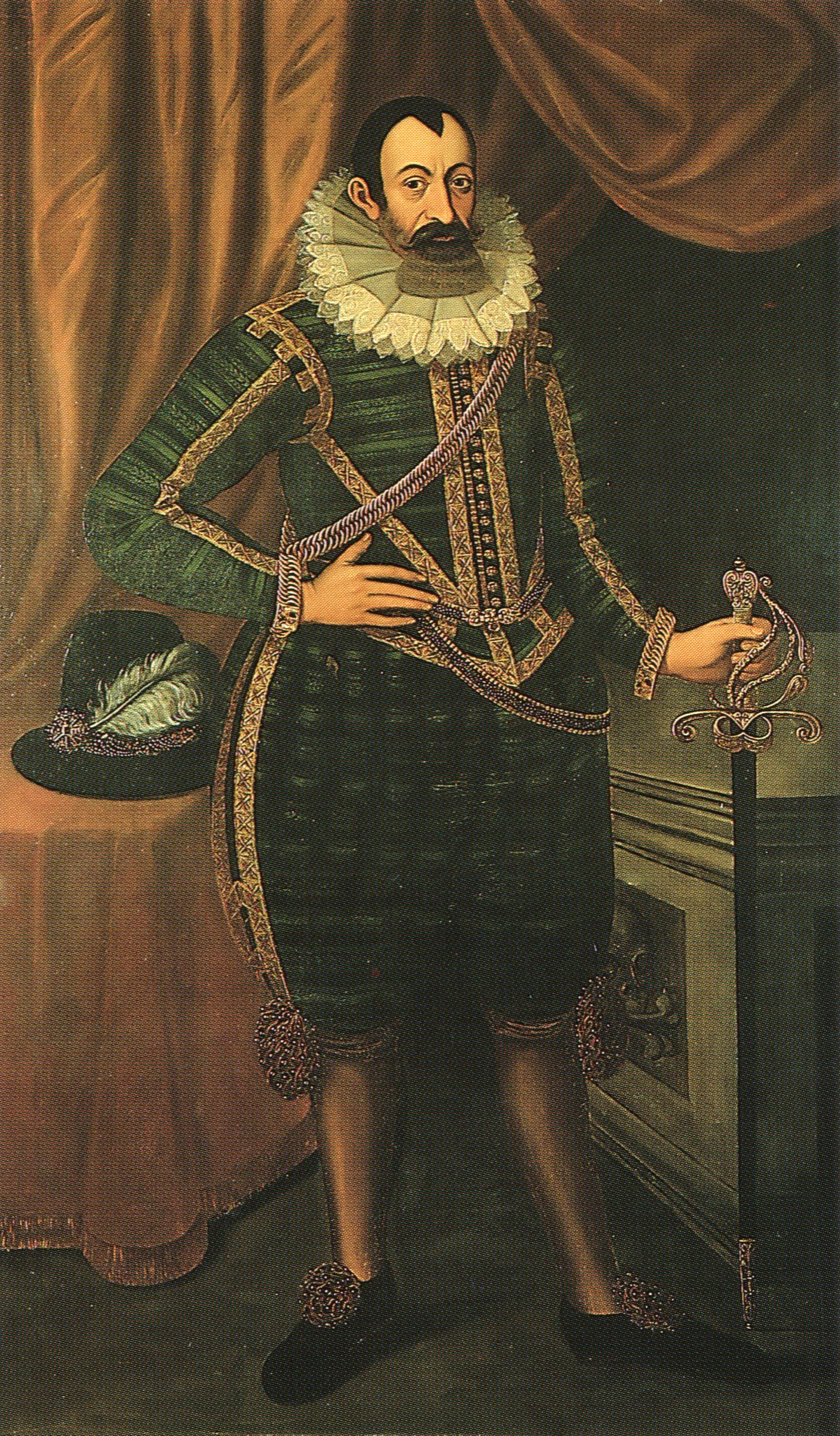
- Portrait by Theodor Fischer, mid-19th century

Duke of Mecklenburg-Güstrow
- Reign: 14 March 1603 - 22 July 1610
- Predecessor: Ulrich III
- Successor: John Albert II
- Born: 28 December 1540; Neustadt
- Died: 22 July 1610 (aged 69); Güstrow
- House: Mecklenburg
- Father: Albert VII, Duke of Mecklenburg
- Mother: Anna of Brandenburg

Charles I (28 December 1540 in Neustadt – 22 July 1610 in Güstrow), was the reigning Duke of Mecklenburg in the Mecklenburg-Güstrow part of the country.

He was the youngest son of the Duke Albert VII and his wife, Anna of Brandenburg. Between 1564 and 1610, Charles was administrator of the commandry of the Order of Saint John at Mirow. After the deaths of his elder brothers John Albert I in 1576 and Ulrich in 1603, he became the ruling Duke of Mecklenburg-Güstrow from 14 March 1603 until his death. He also acted as guardian and regent for his grandnephews John Albert II and Adolf Frederick I, who had inherited Mecklenburg-Schwerin from their father John VII in 1592. Between 1592 and 1610, he was also administrator of the Bishopric of Ratzeburg.

On 17 August 1603, during an outbreak of plague in the region, he had an audience with the English diplomat Stephen Lesieur at Neukloster near Wismar. When in 1603 Ulrich died, Charles I tasked John VII's widow, Sophia of Schleswig-Holstein-Gottorp with the guardianship and regency of Mecklenburg-Schwerin on behalf of her minor sons Adolf Frederick I and John Albert II. In 1608, Charles asked the emperor to declare Adolf Frederick I an adult.

Charles of Mecklenburg House of Mecklenburg Born: 28 December 1540 Died: 22 July 1610
Regnal titles
Religious titles
Preceded by Christopher	Administrator of the Prince-Bishopric of Ratzeburg; 1592–1610	Succeeded by Augustus I
Regnal titles
Preceded by Ulrich	Duke of Mecklenburg-Güstrow; 1603–1610	Succeeded by John Albert II
