= Anna of Mecklenburg =

- Duchess of Courland
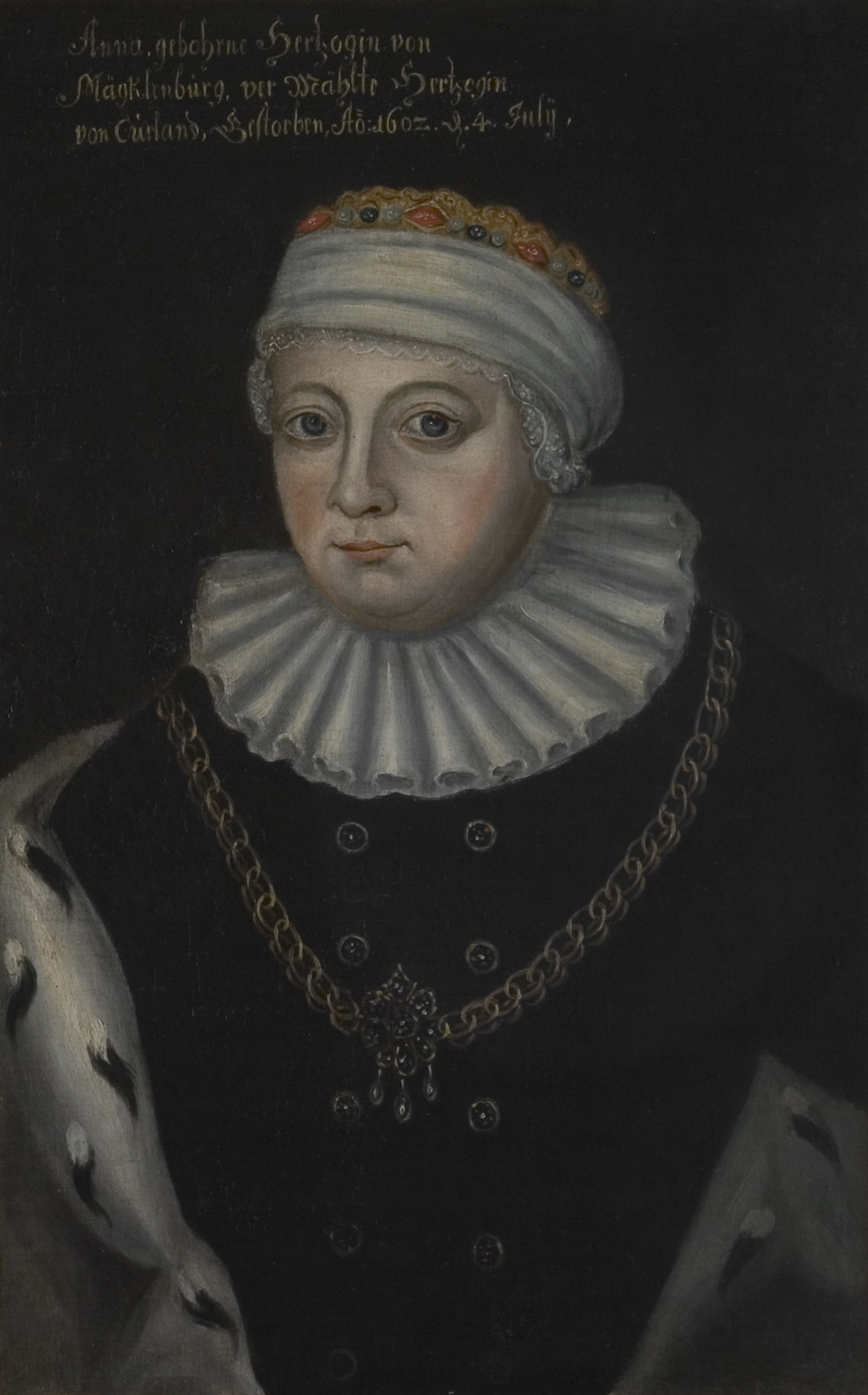
- Portrait, 16th-century
- Born: 14 October 1533; Wismar
- Died: 4 July 1602 (aged 68); Schwerin
- Noble family: Mecklenburg
- Spouse: Gotthard Kettler
- Issue: Anna Kettler; Friedrich Kettler; Wilhelm Kettler
- Father: Albrecht VII, Duke of Mecklenburg
- Mother: Anna of Brandenburg

Anna of Mecklenburg (14 October 1533 – 4 July 1602), was the duchess consort of Courland by marriage to Gotthard Kettler. She was the daughter of Albrecht VII, Duke of Mecklenburg and Anna of Brandenburg. Anna is the first woman in Livonia whose life story is entirely historically confirmed.

== Biography ==
Anna was raised in the Lutheran faith in Mecklenburg, where the reformation had recently been introduced.

She married the Duke of Courland, Gotthard Kettler, on 11 March 1566 in Königsberg. Her marriage was very late for a princess of her period. The marriage was initiated in 1564, and the alliance between Courland and Mecklenburg brought both wealth and important foreign connections to Germany to the recently founded Duchy of Courland.

Anna and Gotthard lived with their household in Riga from their wedding until 1578, when the first Ducal Palace of Mitau was ready to live in. Anna of Mecklenburg was described as a well educated cultural patron, who is credited for having played an important role in the development of art in the new state of Courland.

In this role, she is credited with having commissioned the art of local churches from local artists rather than foreign artists, which had been the normal in Courland. She is also credited with having organized the first Ducal court. She corresponded with her relatives in Germany, maintaining foreign diplomatic connections to the Duchy.

She was widowed in 1587. In 1598, she visited her brother in Gustrow.

== Children ==
She had the following children:

- Anna Kettler (1567–1617); married in 1586 to Albrecht Radziwiłł.
- Friedrich Kettler (1569–1642); married in 1600 Elisabeth Magdalena of Pomerania, no issue.
- Wilhelm Kettler (1574–1640); married in 1609 Sophia of Brandenburg-Prussia:
  - Jacob Kettler; succeeded as Duke of Courland and Semigallia. Married Margravine Louise Charlotte of Brandenburg and had issue.

Anna of Mecklenburg House of Mecklenburg Born: 14 October 1533 Died: 4 July 1602
New title	Duchess consort of Courland; 1566–1587	Succeeded by Elisabeth Magdalena of Pomerania
