= Dorothea of Denmark, Duchess of Prussia =

Dorothea of Denmark
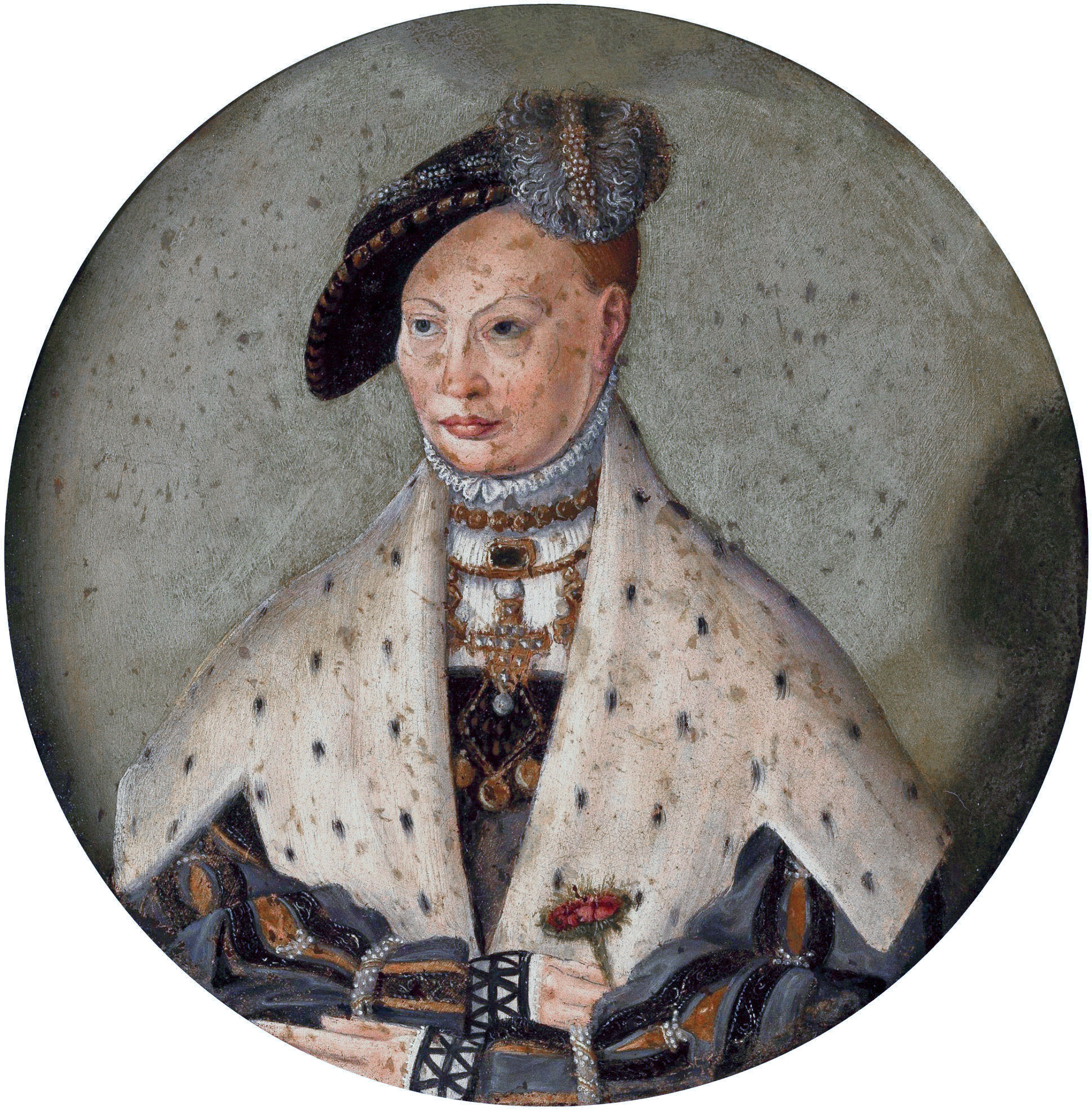
- Portrait by Jacob Binck

Duchess consort of Prussia
- Tenure: 1 July 1526 – 11 April 1547
- Born: 1 August 1504; Denmark
- Died: 11 April 1547 (aged 42)
- Spouse: Albert, Duke of Prussia
- Issue among others...: Anna Sophia, Duchess of Mecklenburg
- Father: Frederick I of Denmark
- Mother: Anna of Brandenburg

Dorothea of Denmark (1 August 1504 – 11 April 1547), was a Duchess of Prussia by marriage to Duke Albert, Duke of Prussia. She was the daughter of King Frederick I of Denmark and Anna of Brandenburg.

== Life ==
After her father's accession to the throne in 1523 a marriage was suggested to the English claimant to the throne, Duke Richard of Suffolk, who was supported by King Francis of France, but without success.

In 1525, she received a proposal from the newly made Duke of Prussia. The marriage was arranged by her father's German chancellor Wolfgang von Utenhof. The wedding was conducted 12 February 1526 and Dorothea arrived with a large entourage in Königsberg in June.

Dorothea had a very good relationship with Albert and this contributed to a good and active contact between Denmark and Prussia which continued during her brother's reign and until her death. Dorothea and her spouse corresponded with her brother, the king of Denmark, and acted as his political advisors. Dorothea and Albert were present at the coronation of Christian III of Denmark in Copenhagen in 1537; they also acted as foster-parents of her nephew Duke Hans of Denmark in 1536–1542.

The Königsberg Cathedral has a monument of her.

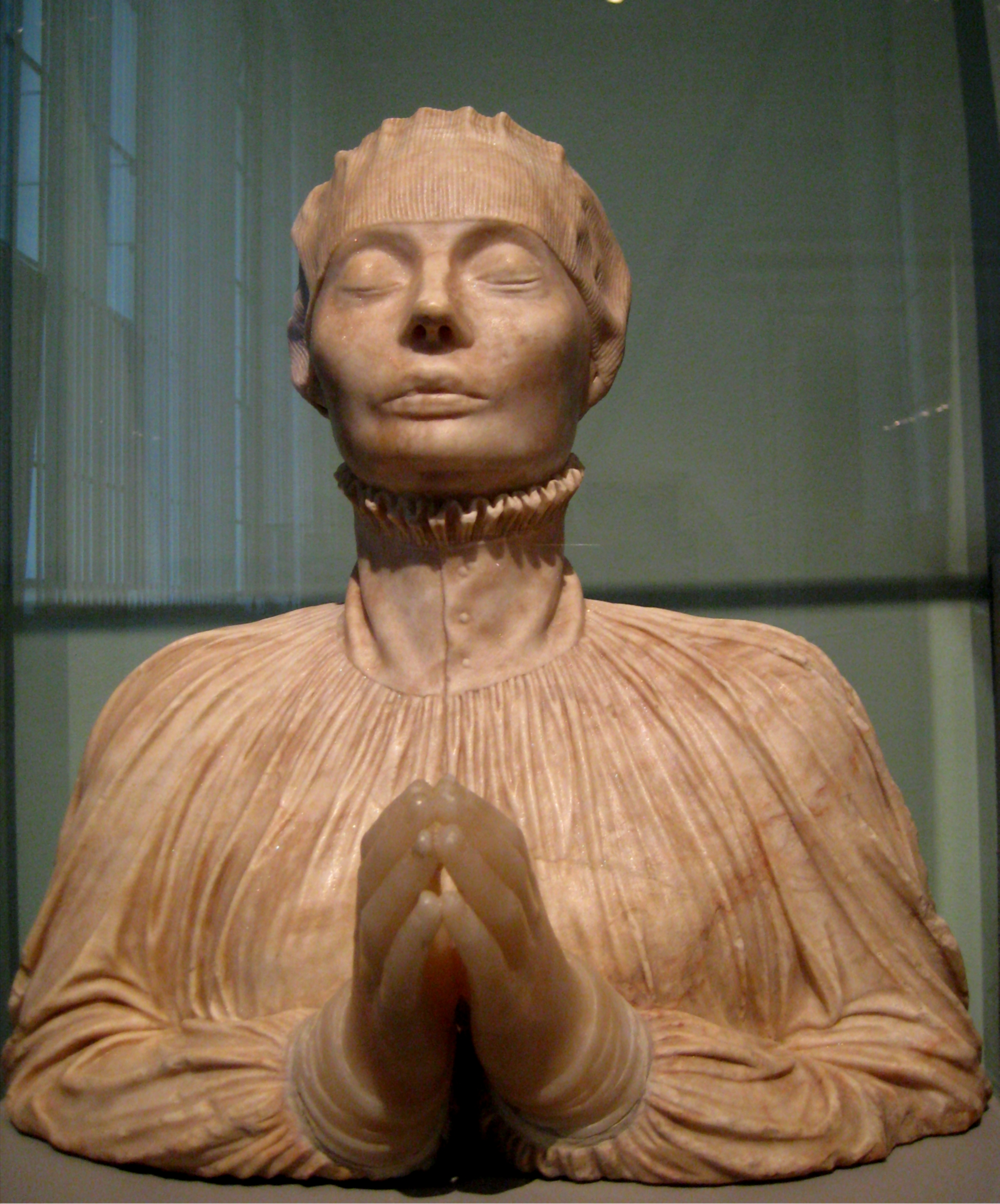
Funeral monument, now in Pushkin museum

== Issue ==
- Anna Sophia (11 June 1527 – 6 February 1591), married John Albert I, Duke of Mecklenburg-Güstrow.
- Katharina (b. and d. 24 February 1528).
- Frederick Albert (5 December 1529 – 1 January 1530).
- Lucia Dorothea (8 April 1531 – 1 February 1532).
- Lucia (3 February 1537 – May 1539).
- Albert (b. and d. March 1539).

Vacant Title last held by New title	Duchess consort of Prussia; 1525–1547	Succeeded by Anna Marie of Brunswick-Lüneburg
