= Magnus III of Mecklenburg-Schwerin =

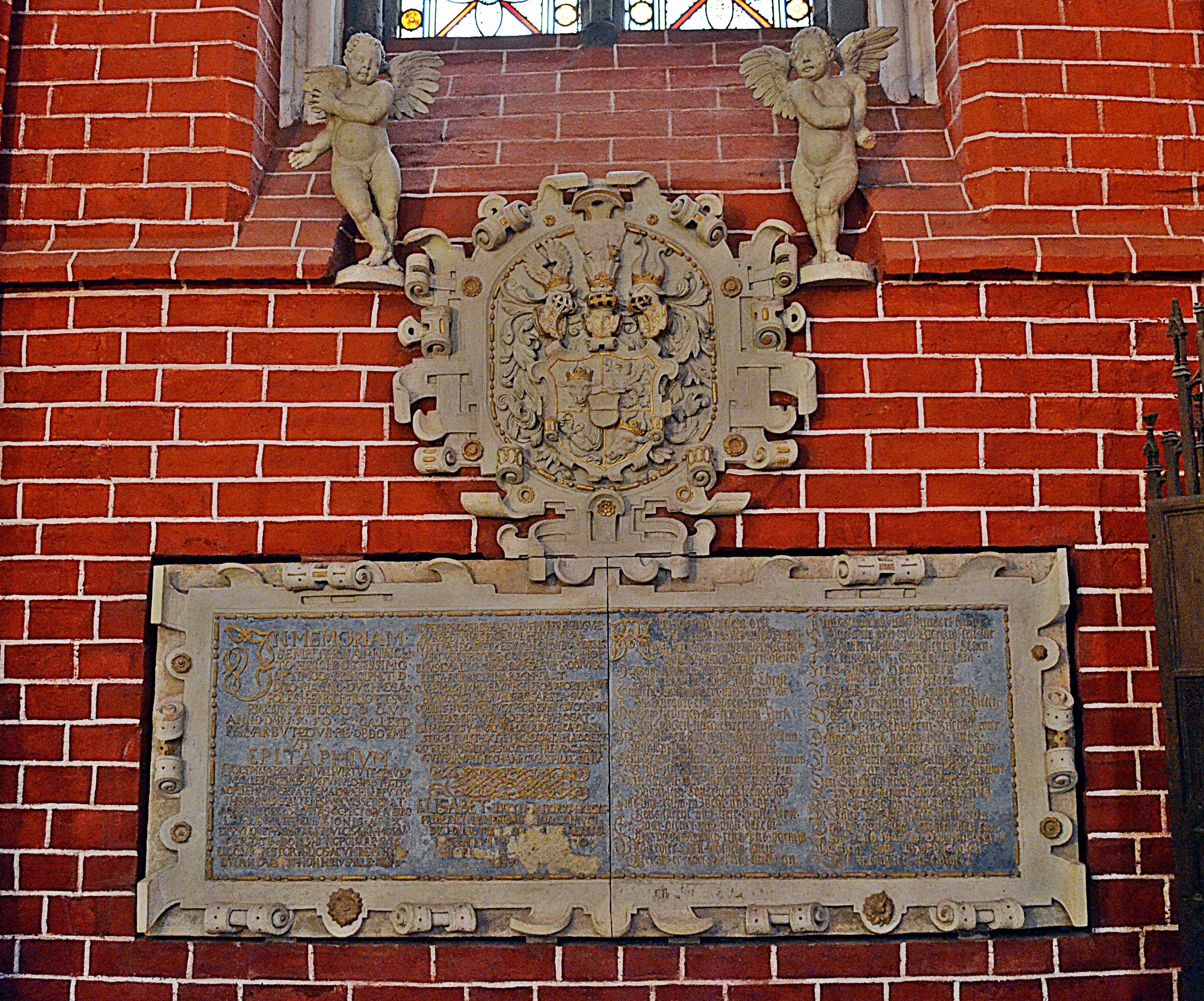

Magnus III of Mecklenburg (4 July 1509 in Stargard – 28 January 1550 in Bützow) was a member of the House of Mecklenburg who was the first Lutheran administrator of the Prince-Bishopric of Schwerin, nevertheless referred to as Prince-Bishop. He was the son of Henry V, Duke of Mecklenburg and Ursula of Brandenburg. He was elected bishop in 1516, but due to his minority and lack of papal confirmation, he only began ruling as an administrator in 1532. In the next year, he introduced the Protestant Reformation. He married Elizabeth of Denmark, eldest daughter of King Frederick I of Denmark and his second wife, Sophie of Pomerania. They had no children.

Magnus of Mecklenburg-Schwerin House of Nikloting Born: 4 July 1509 in Stargard Died: 28 January 1550 in Bützow
Regnal titles
Religious titles
Vacant Title last held by Petrus Wolkow as Prince-Bishop meanwhile held by administrators dean Zutpheld Wardenberg (1516–1522) and provost Heinrich Banzkow (1522–1532)	Administrator of the Prince-Bishopric of Schwerin; 1532–1550	Succeeded by Ulrich of Mecklenburg as Ulrich I
