= Anna of Brandenburg, Duchess of Mecklenburg =

Duchess consort of Mecklenburg from 1524 to 1567

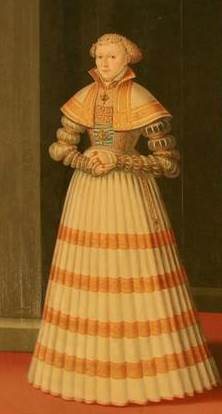
- Born: 1 January 1507
- Died: 19 June 1567 (aged 60); Lübz
- Buried: Schwerin Cathedral
- Noble family: House of Hohenzollern
- Spouse: Albrecht VII, Duke of Mecklenburg (m. 1524; died 1547)
- Issue: Magnus of Mecklenburg; John Albert I, Duke of Mecklenburg-Güstrow; Ulrich III, Duke of Mecklenburg-Güstrow; George of Mecklenburg; Anna, Duchess of Courland; Louis of Mecklenburg; John of Mecklenburg; Christopher, Duke of Mecklenburg-Gadebusch; Sophie of Mecklenburg; Charles I, Duke of Mecklenburg
- Father: Joachim I, Elector of Brandenburg
- Mother: Elisabeth of Denmark

Anna of Brandenburg (1 January 1507 – 19 June 1567) was the duchess consort of Mecklenburg from 1524 to 1567.

== Life ==
Anna was the eldest daughter of the Elector Joachim I of Brandenburg (1484–1535) from his marriage to Elizabeth (1485–1555), daughter of King John of Denmark.

She married on 17 January 1524, in Berlin with Duke Albert VII of Mecklenburg (1486–1547). She brought a dowry of 20000guilders into the marriage, and in return received as her jointure the city and district of Lübz and the district of Crivitz.

After her husband's death in 1547, she took up residence at the Eldenburg in her widow seat of Lübz.

Anna died in 1567. In her will, dated 25 March 1557, John Albert I had her buried in Schwerin Cathedral.

== Issue ==
From her marriage Anna had the following children:

- Magnus (1524-1524)
- John Albert I (1525–1576), Duke of Mecklenburg, married
  1. in 1555 Princess Anna Sophia of Prussia (1527–1591)
- Ulrich III (1527–1603), Duke of Mecklenburg, married
  1. in 1556 Princess Elizabeth of Denmark (1524–1586)
  2. in 1588 Princess Anna of Pomerania-Wolgast (1554–1626)
- George (1528–1552)
- Anna (1533–1602), married
  1. in 1566 with Gotthard Kettler, Duke of Courland (1517–1587)
- Louis (1535-1535)
- John (1536-1536)
- Christopher (1537–1592), Administrator of Ratzeburg, married
  1. in 1573 with Princess Dorothea of Denmark (1528–1575)
  2. in 1581 with Princess Elisabeth of Sweden (1549–1597)
- Sophie (1538-1538)
- Charles I (1540–1610), Duke of Mecklenburg

== Bibliography ==
- Ernst Seraphim: Geschichte Von Livland: 1. Band: Das Livlndische Mittelalter Und Die Zeit Der Reformation, BiblioBazaar, LLC, 2009, p. 212 ff
- Friedrich Ludwig Röper: Geschichte und Anekdoten von Dobberan in Mecklenburg:, self-published, 1808, p. 176
