= William Bourne (mathematician) =

English mathematician

William Bourne (c. 1535–1582) was an English mathematician, innkeeper and former Royal Navy gunner who presented the first design for a navigable submarine and wrote important navigational manuals. He is often called William Bourne of Gravesend.

In 1574, he produced a popular version of the Martín Cortés de Albacar's Arte de Navegar, entitled A Regiment for the Sea. Bourne was critical of some aspects of the original and produced a manual of more practical use to the seaman. He described how to make observations of the sun and stars, using a cross-staff, and how to plot coastal features from the ship by taking bearings using triangulation.

== Life in Gravesend ==
Before publishing his submarine design, William Bourne was a jurat in Gravesend, England. His name first appears in the first charter of incorporation of Gravesend from June 5, 1562. His name appears once again as a jurat in the second charter of Gravesend, June 5, 1568. During the time of the second charter, the only records of regulations for trading in Gravesend are written in Bourne's handwriting. This would imply that he held an office such as clerk of the market. He also worked as an innkeeper during this time, one of fourteen in the town of Gravesend.

== Submarine Design ==
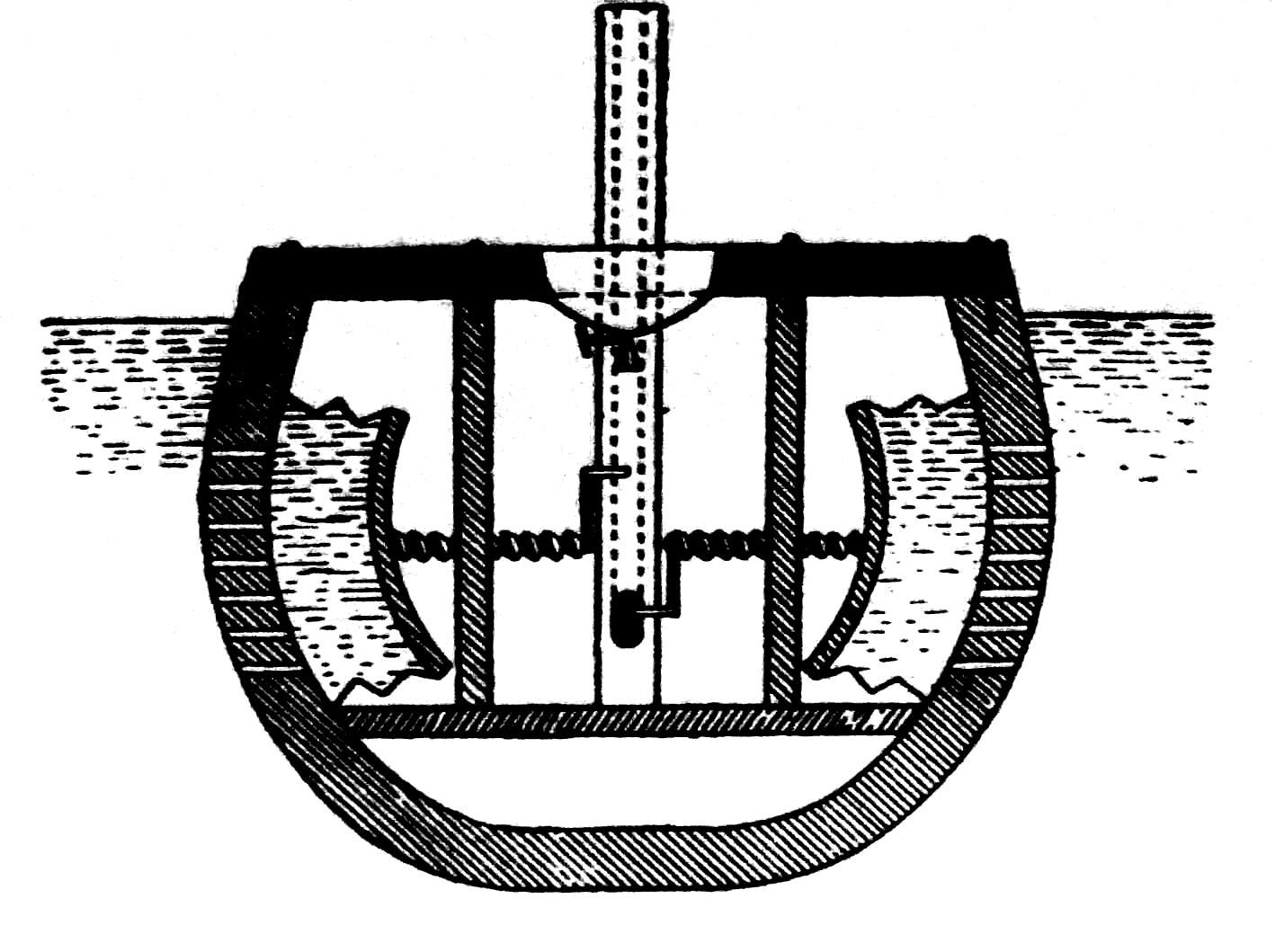
Submarine by William Bourne, in Inventions or devices, 1578.

His design, detailed in his book Inventions or Devises published in 1578, was one of the first recorded plans for an underwater navigation vehicle. He designed an enclosed craft capable of submerging by decreasing the overall volume (rather than flooding chambers as in modern submarines), and being rowed underwater. Bourne described a ship with a wooden frame covered in waterproofed leather, but the description was a general principle rather than a detailed plan. However, the concept of an underwater rowing boat was eventually put into action by the Dutchman Cornelius Drebbel in 1620, and Nathaniel Symons demonstrated a 'sinking boat' in 1729 using the expanding and contracting volume of the boat to submerge.

The submarine was the subject of a modern-day recreation on season 3 of "The Re-Inventors" TV show, episode "Bourne Submarine". The recreation had limited functionality before it sank when water pressure ruptured some membranes on a test descent.

== Inventions or Devises ==
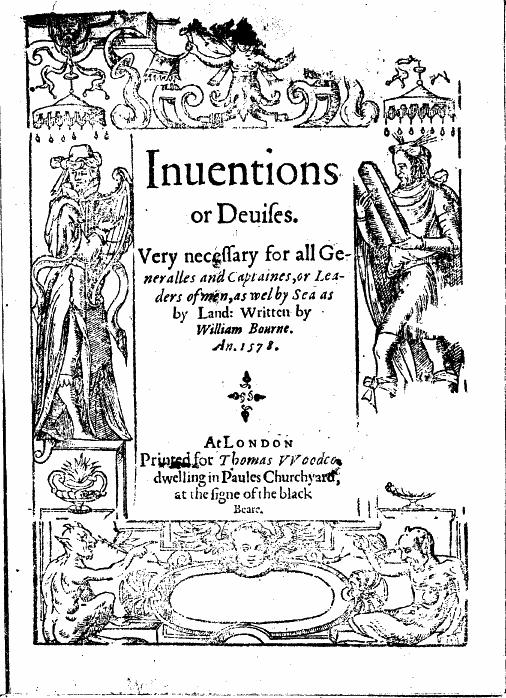
The first page of "Inventions or Devises" by William Bourne, published in 1578

Inventions or Devises, published in 1578, is one of William Bourne's more important works. This book gives many guides and instructional tools for sailors, mostly concerning interactions with other ships. The 21st device listed is the earliest known description of a ship's log and line, which he attributes to Humprey Cole, an officer of the Tower Mint. The 75th device on the list is a description of a night signal or early semaphore system to be used between people on distant ships who had previously decided on a code consisting of a series of lights and fashion of standing.

The 110th entry is what seems to be a type of telescope. The device was said to have been employed by mathematician and surveyor Leonard Digges and Bourne was asked to investigate it by Queen Elizabeth I's chief advisor Lord Burghley. Bourne's is the best description of it, and from his writing it seemed to consist of peering into a large curved mirror that reflected the image produced by a large lens (Bourne noted in his report that the device worked but had a very narrow field of view, making impractical in military applications). This "backwards" reflecting telescope predates the earliest known working telescope by 30 years but its unwieldy nature seems to have kept it from being developed.

== Partial list of publications ==
- An Almanac and Prognostication for Three Years, 1571
- William Bourns booke of artillery, 1572 (draft manuscript)
- Treasure for Travellers, 1572/3
- Art of Shooting in Great Ordnance, 1572/3
- A Regiment for the Sea, 1574 (11 English editions from 1574 to 1631, at least 3 Dutch editions starting in 1594)
- A Booke called the Treasure for Traueilers, 1578 (republished in 1641 as A Mate for Mariners)
- Inventions or Devises. Very Necessary for all Generalles and Captaines, as wel by Sea as by Land, 1578
- The Arte of Shooting in Great Ordinance, 1578, 1587, 1643
- "On Optical Glasses," transcribed manuscript published in Halliwell's Rara Mathematica.
