= Anna Radziwiłłowa =

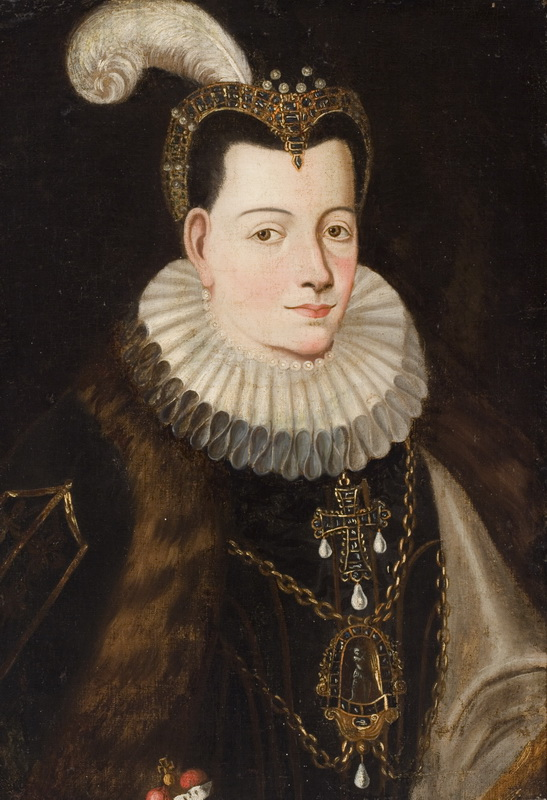
Anna Radziwiłłowa

Anna Radziwiłłowa (1567–1617), was a Polish magnate and court official. She was the daughter of duke Gotthard Kettler of Courland, and married Albrecht Radziwiłł in 1586. She regularly attended court and served as a lady-in-waiting to Anne of Austria, Queen of Poland, in 1593-1598.
