= Schwerin Cathedral =

- Schweriner Dom
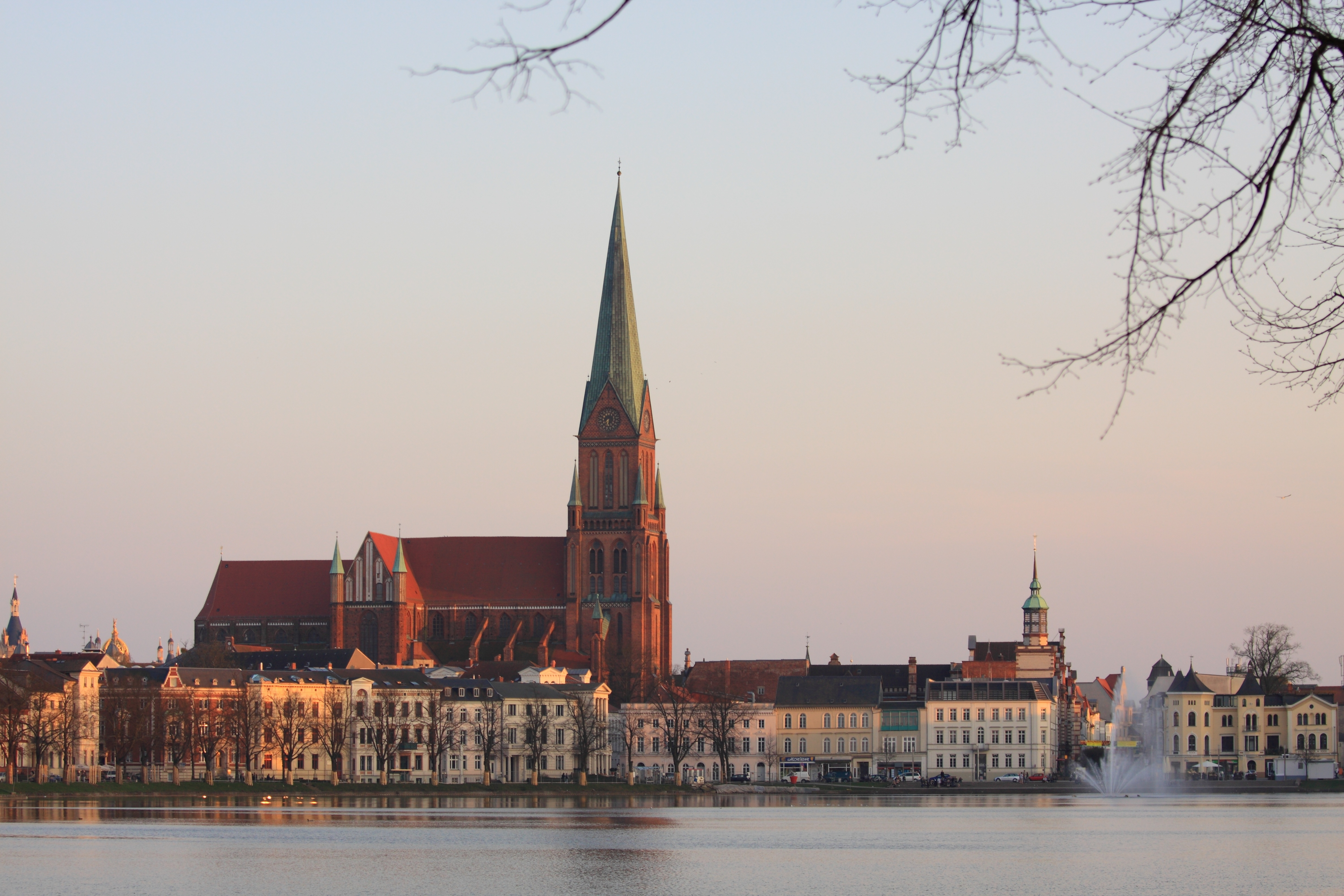
- Cathedral seen from Pfaffenteich
- Schwerin Cathedral
- 53°37′47″N 11°24′53″E
- Denomination: Lutheran
- Previous denomination: Roman Catholic

Architecture
- Functional status: Active
- Style: Gothic

Schwerin Cathedral (German: Schweriner Dom) is an Evangelical Lutheran Cathedral located in the town of Schwerin, Germany. It is dedicated to the Virgin Mary and Saint John. Along with St. Mary's Church, Lübeck and St. Nicholas' Church, Stralsund, it is one of the earliest large examples of Brick Gothic architecture.

It was built following the move here of the seat of the Bishopric of the Abodrites, established by Henry the Lion, from the old city of Mecklenburg in the late 12th century. The first cathedral was built of timber. The foundation stone of the stone cathedral of the Prince-Bishopric of Schwerin was laid in 1172. After a construction period of seventy-six years, it was consecrated in 1248. During the Reformation in 1524, it was confiscated from the Catholic Church and given to the Lutherans. It is now the seat of the Bishop of the Evangelical Lutheran Church of Mecklenburg.

In 1222 Count Henry of Schwerin returned from the Fifth Crusade with a reliquary of the Holy Blood, an alleged drop of Christ's blood contained in a jewel. This was placed in the cathedral, and caused it to become a place of pilgrimage.

During the 14th century the nave and transept were completed, as well as the chapter buildings. At the end of the 15th century the cloister on the north side was finished.

The tower, 117.5 metres high, was constructed between 1889 and 1893. It is the tallest church spire in the state of Mecklenburg-Vorpommern.

== Burials ==
- Anna of Brandenburg, Duchess of Mecklenburg (1507–1567)
- Anna Sophia of Prussia (1527–1591)
- Christopher, Duke of Mecklenburg (1537–1592)

== Gallery ==
Schwerin Cathedral

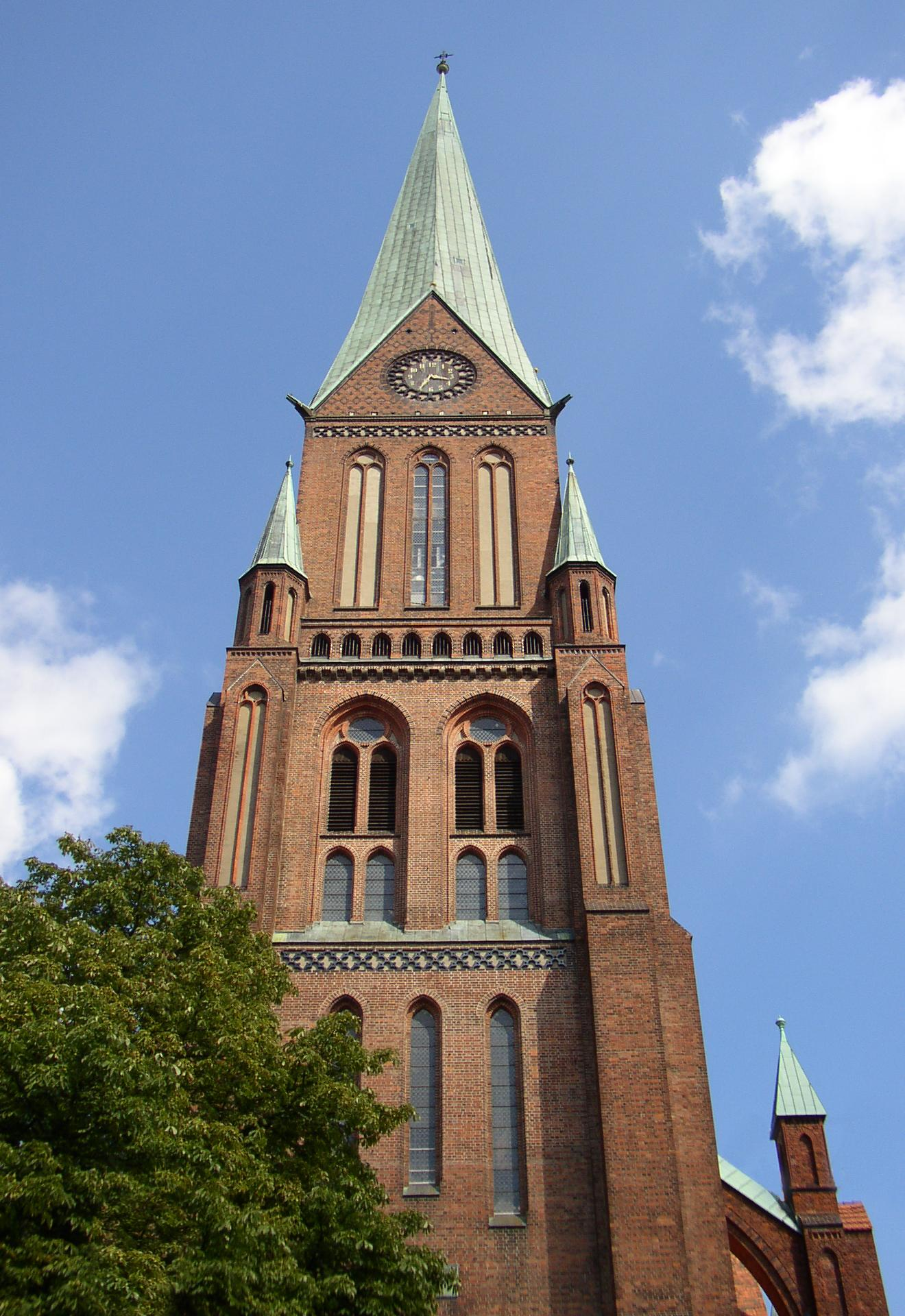
The tower

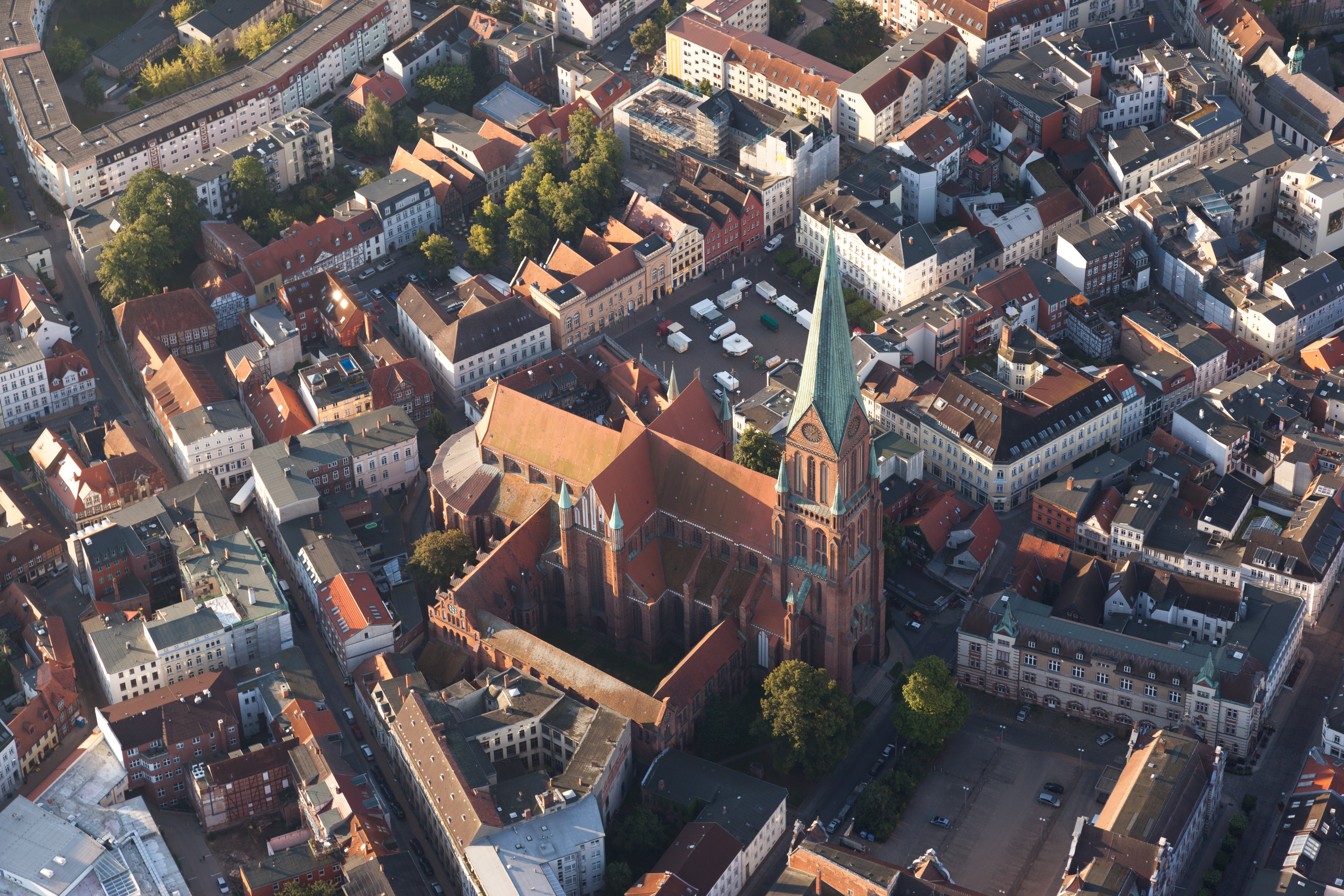
Aerial view

The Nave

Retable
