= Tilemann Stella =

German librarian, mathematician

Tilemann Stella (c. 1525-1589) was a German mathematician.

== Biography ==
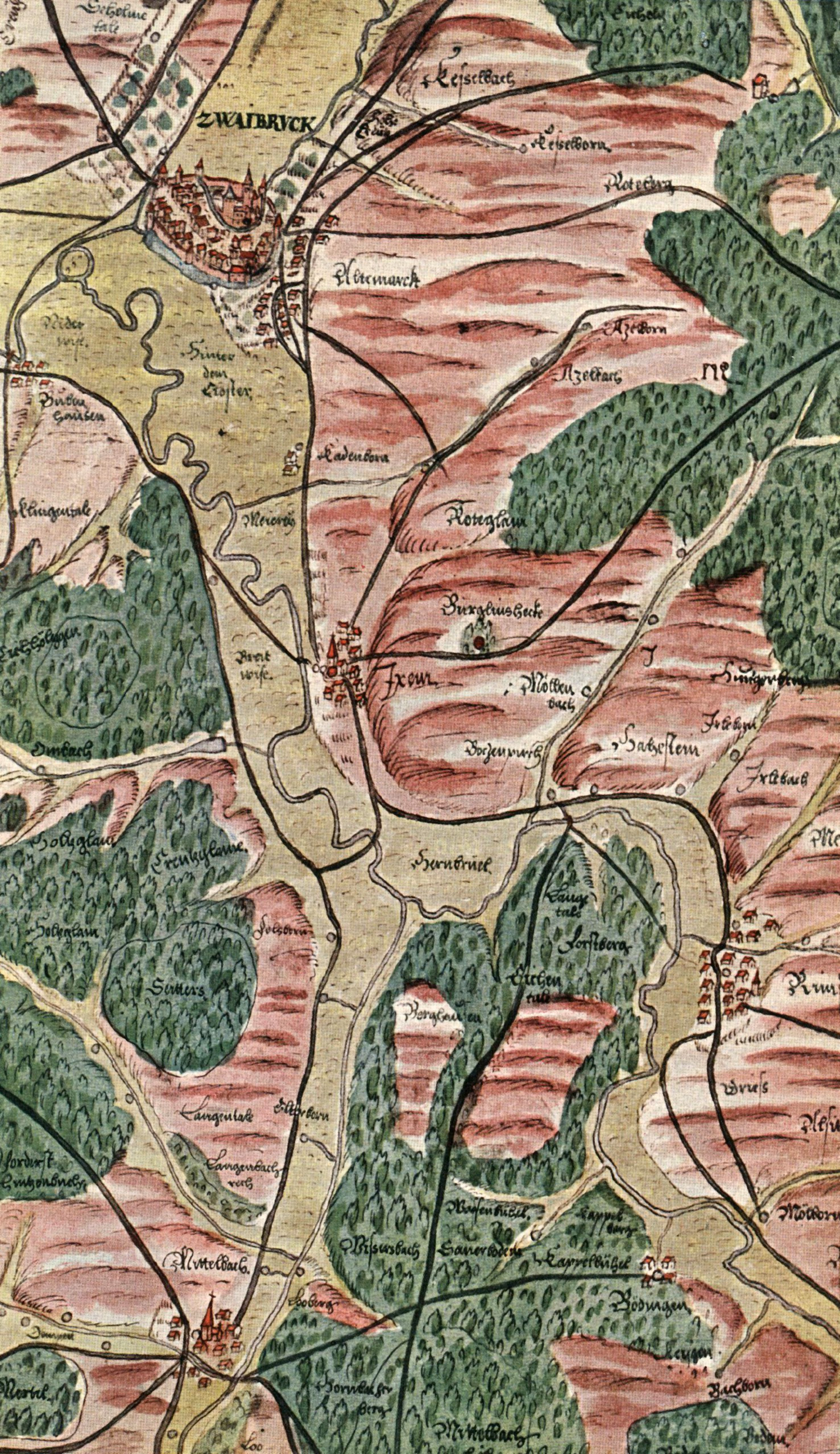
Zweibruecken on a map from 1564 by Tilemann Stella

Tilemann was born as Tilemann Stoltz in 1525 in Siegen. He studied at the Latin school in Siegen before attending the Martin Luther University of Halle-Wittenberg, the University of Marburg, and the University of Cologne. He was taught by mathematicians such as Johannes Dryander and Erasmus Reinhold. Stella became a close student of Philipp Melanchthon, who entrusted him with creating cartographic representations for biblical studies. He created maps of the Holy Land, Exodus route, and Germany, with plans for further maps that were never completed.

In 1552, John Albert I, Duke of Mecklenburg started funding his work. He began mapping Mecklenburg and made a celestial globe in 1555. In 1560, he was employed as a court mathematician and librarian in Schwerin. He documented his travels with Duke Johann Albrecht and created further maps in Mecklenburg, including planning and supervising the construction of a canal between Dömitz and Wismar. He also charted Mansfeld and Luxembourg for the Counts of Mansfeld and created maps for Duke Wolfgang von Pfalz-Zweibrücken.

Following Duke Johann Albrecht's death in 1576, Stella's connection with Mecklenburg weakened, and he worked for the courts of Saxony and Brandenburg-Ansbach. Around 1582, he entered the service of Duke John I of Palatinate-Zweibrücken, becoming the head of the court library and planning a canal between the Rhine and Saar. Stella died in 1589, and his estate was eventually sold to the "Bibliotheca Bipontina."
