= Ulrich, Duke of Mecklenburg =

Ulrich III
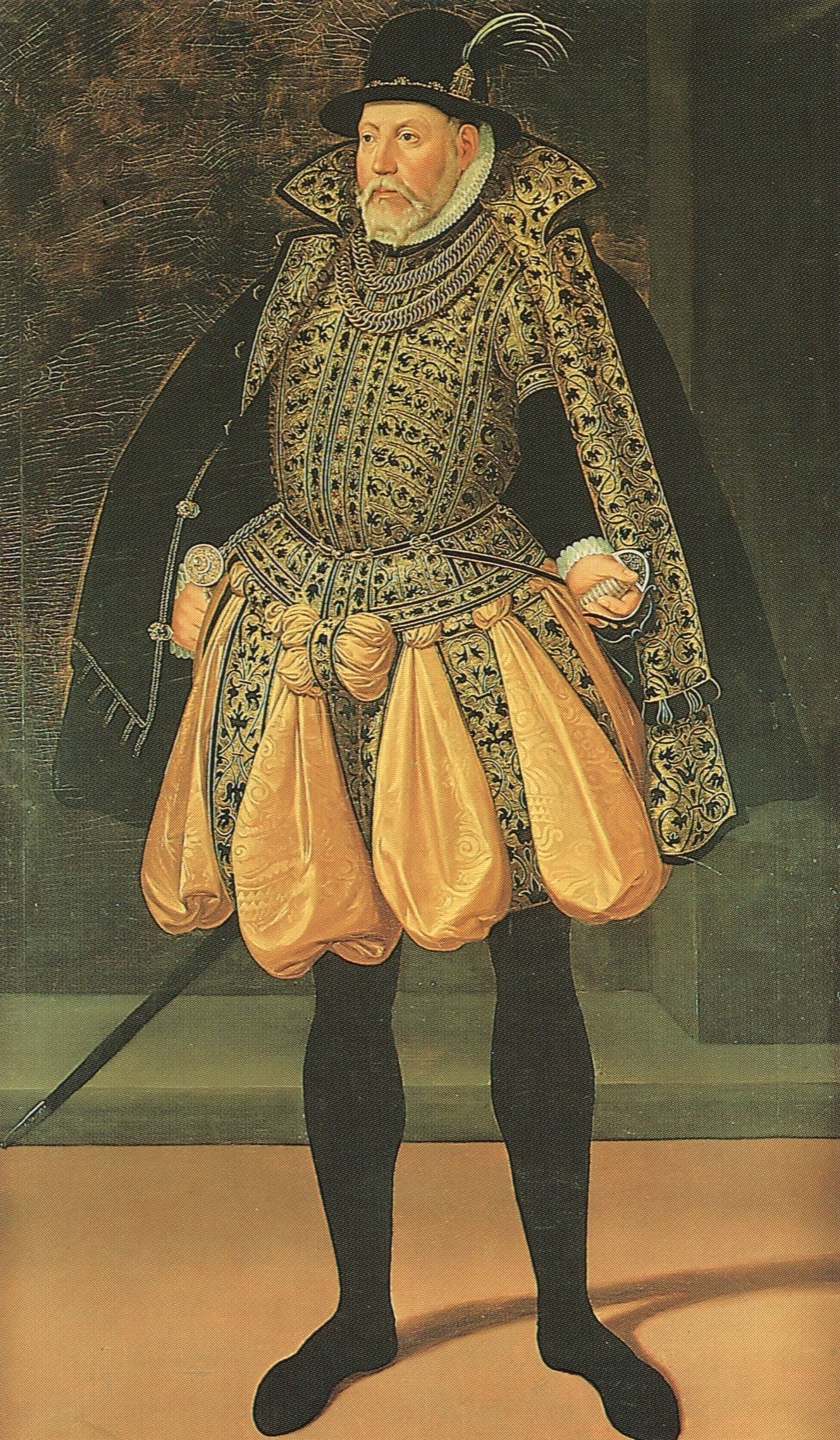
- Portrait by Theodor Fischer, mid-19th century

Duke of Mecklenburg-Güstrow
- Reign: 17 February 1555 - 14 March 1603
- Predecessor: John Albert I
- Successor: Charles I
- Born: 5 March 1527; Schwerin
- Died: 14 March 1603 (aged 76); Güstrow
- Spouse: Elizabeth of Denmark; Anna of Pomerania
- Issue: Sophie, Queen of Denmark and Norway
- House: House of Mecklenburg
- Father: Albrecht VII, Duke of Mecklenburg
- Mother: Anna of Brandenburg

Ulrich III, Duke of Mecklenburg or Ulrich III of Mecklenburg-Güstrow (5 March 1527 – 14 March 1603) was Duke of Mecklenburg (-Güstrow) from 1555-56 to 1603.

== Early life ==
Ulrich was the third son of Duke Albrecht VII and Anna of Brandenburg. Ulrich was educated at the Bavarian court. He later studied theology and law in Ingolstadt. After the death of his father, he took up residence in Bützow and succeeded his cousin Duke Magnus III of Mecklenburg-Schwerin as Lutheran administrator of the Prince-Bishopric of Schwerin in 1550. He later married Magnus's widow, Elizabeth, a daughter of King Frederick I of Denmark. His wife was actually a first cousin of his maternal grandmother Elizabeth of Denmark, daughter of John, King of Denmark. They were first cousins, twice removed. After the death of Elizabeth, he married Anna, daughter of Philip I, Duke of Pomerania.

After the death of his uncle, Henry V, Duke of Mecklenburg, Ulrich took part in the national government, especially during Mecklenburg's participation in the Schmalkaldic War. It erupted from an inheritance dispute, which was settled by the "Ruppiner dictum" of the Elector of Brandenburg.

== Reign ==
On 17 February 1555, Ulrich succeeded his brother John Albert I in partitioned Mecklenburg-Güstrow. In 1556, he received, while maintaining common state government with his brother, the eastern part of Mecklenburg with the capital in Güstrow, and John Albert received the western part with the residence Schwerin. After the death of his brother in 1576, Ulrich became guardian of his offspring, among them his nephew and successor in Güstrow John Albert II. Ulrich built the castle at Güstrow as his main residence.

Ulrich embodied an educated, modern prince, and was a devout Lutheran. He developed into one of the leading princes of the Mecklenburg dynasty. He left behind, at his death, a fortune of about 200,000 guilders. Ulrich participated in the exchange with Tycho Brahe and David Chytraeus in the scientific discourse of his time and corresponded with humanists like Heinrich Rantzau. In 1594, as Chief of Lower Saxony imperial circle, he organized military and financial assistance against the Turkish threat.

In the dispute between Frederick II of Denmark and his brother-in-law Duke John Adolf, Duke of Holstein-Gottorp, Ulrich was a mediator, having excellent relations to both. As Administrator of the Prince-Bishopric of Schwerin, he was succeeded by his grandson the last Bishop of Schleswig, Prince Ulrich of Denmark (30 December 1578 – 27 March 1624 in Rühn), who married Lady Catherine Hahn-Hinrichshagen.

=== Diplomacy with Scotland ===
Ulrich's granddaughter Anne of Denmark married James VI of Scotland. Ulrich sent Joachim von Bassewitz as his ambassador to the baptism of Prince Henry with gifts of jewels. In 1598, James VI was anxious to secure the throne of England. He sent his ambassadors to his wife's family and allies, to discuss his right to Elizabeth's throne and that the Princes of Europe should support him against Spanish claims, with military help if required. Ulrich wrote to James on 20 August with a letter of cautious support, counselling that Elizabeth should first name him her successor, and was indifferent on a definite pledge of arms.

== Family ==
Ulrich's only child from his marriage to Elizabeth of Denmark, Sophie, married King Frederick II of Denmark. Through her, Ulrich was the maternal grandfather of Christian IV of Denmark and the great-grandfather of Charles I of England.

Ulrich of Mecklenburg-Güstrow House of Nikloting Born: 5 March 1527 in Schwerin Died: 14 March 1603 in Güstrow
Regnal titles
Religious titles
Preceded by Magnus III of Mecklenburg-Schwerin	Administrator of the Prince-Bishopric of Schwerin as Ulrich I 1550–1603	Succeeded by Ulrik of Denmark as Ulrich II
Regnal titles
Preceded by John Albert I, Duke of Mecklenburg	Duke of Mecklenburg-Güstrow as Ulrich III; 1555–1603	Succeeded by Charles I, Duke of Mecklenburg
