= Albert, Duke of Prussia =

Duke of Prussia from 1525 to 1568

Albert
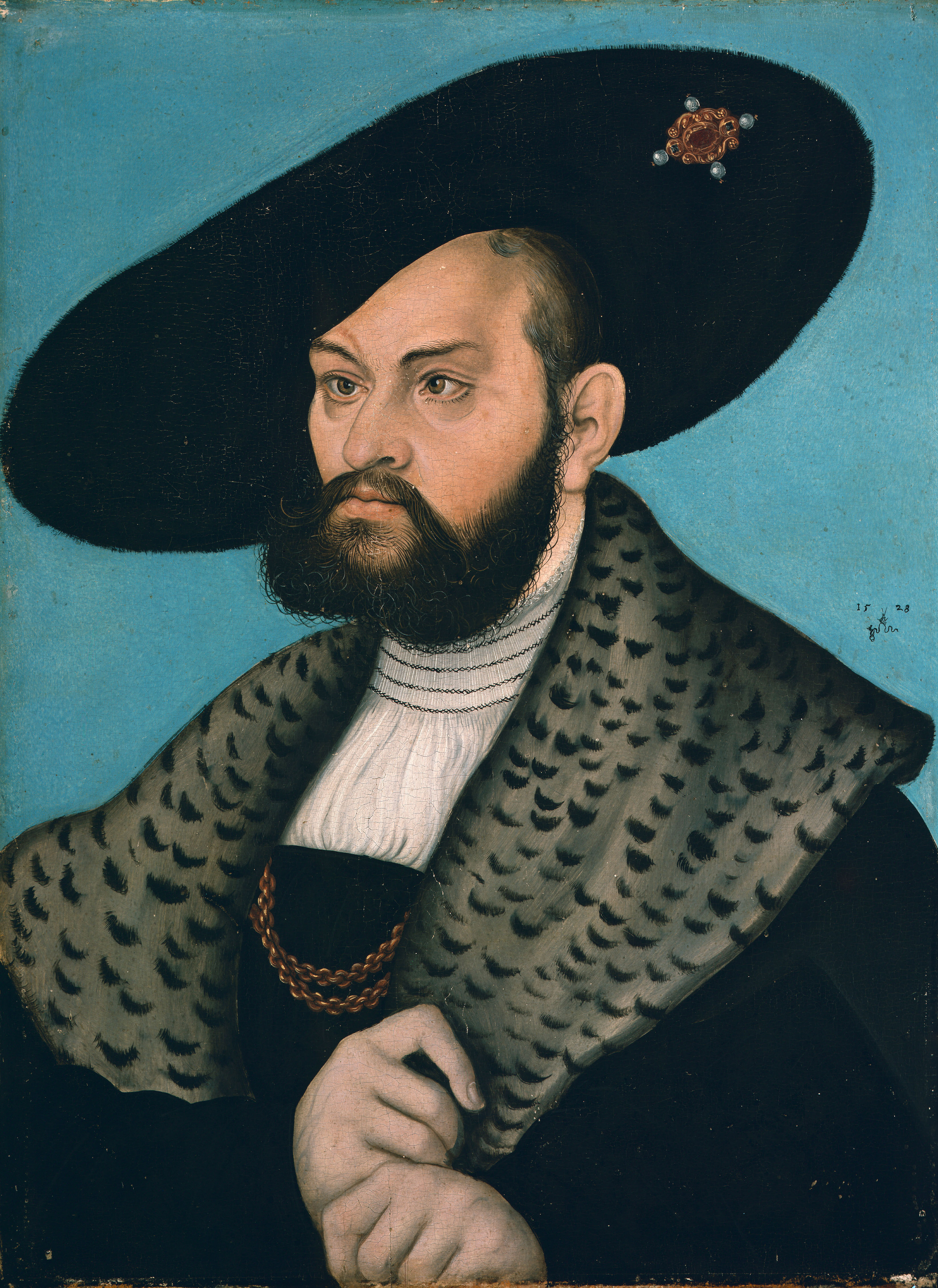
- Portrait by Lucas Cranach the Elder, 1528

Grand Master of the Teutonic Knights
- Reign: 1510 – 1525
- Predecessor: Duke Frederick of Saxony
- Successor: Walter von Cronberg

Duke of Prussia
- Reign: 10 April 1525 – 20 March 1568
- Successor: Albert Frederick of Prussia
- Born: 17 May 1490; Ansbach, Brandenburg-Ansbach, Holy Roman Empire (now Bavaria, Germany)
- Died: 20 March 1568 (aged 77); Tapiau Castle, Tapiau, Prussia (now Gvardeysk, Russia)
- Spouse: Dorothea of Denmark (m. 1526; died 1547) Anna Marie of Brunswick-Lüneburg (m. 1550)
- Issue among others...: Anna Sophia; Albert Frederick
- House: House of Hohenzollern
- Father: Frederick I of Brandenburg-Ansbach
- Mother: Sophia of Poland

Albert of Prussia (German: Albrecht von Preussen; 17 May 1490 – 20 March 1568) was a German prince who was the 37th grand master of the Teutonic Knights and, after converting to Lutheranism, became the first ruler of the Duchy of Prussia, the secularized state that emerged from the former Monastic State of the Teutonic Knights. Albert was the first European ruler to establish Lutheranism, and thus Protestantism, as the official state religion of his lands. He proved instrumental in the political spread of Protestantism in its early stage, ruling the Prussian lands for nearly six decades (1510–1568).

Albert was the great-grandson of the converted pagan ruler Jogaila of Poland and Lithuania, vanquisher of the Teutonic Knights at the Battle of Grunwald. He was also a member of the Brandenburg-Ansbach branch of the House of Hohenzollern. He became grand master of the Teutonic Knights in their attempt to diplomatically win over the Polish-Lithuanian union. His skill in political administration and leadership ultimately succeeded in reversing the decline of the Teutonic Order. But Albert was sympathetic to the demands of Martin Luther, whose teachings had become popular in his lands. So he rebelled against the Roman Catholic Church and the Holy Roman Empire by converting the Teutonic state into a Protestant and hereditary realm, the Duchy of Prussia, for which he paid homage to his uncle, Sigismund I, king of Poland. That arrangement was confirmed by the Treaty of Kraków in 1525. Albert pledged a personal oath to the king and in return was invested with the duchy for himself and his heirs.

Albert's rule in Prussia was fairly prosperous. Although he had some trouble with the peasantry, the confiscation of the lands and treasures of the Catholic Church enabled him to propitiate the nobles and provide for the expenses of the newly established Prussian court. He was active in imperial politics, joining the League of Torgau in 1526, and acted in unison with the Protestants in plotting to overthrow Emperor Charles V after the issue of the Augsburg Interim in May 1548. Albert established schools in every town and founded the University of Königsberg in 1544. He promoted culture and arts, patronising the works of Erasmus Reinhold and Caspar Hennenberger. During the final years of his rule, Albert was forced to raise taxes instead of further confiscating now-depleted church lands, causing peasant rebellion. The intrigues of the court favourites Johann Funck and Paul Skalić also led to various religious and political disputes. Albert spent his final years virtually deprived of power and died at Tapiau on 20 March 1568. His son, Albert Frederick, succeeded him as Duke of Prussia.

== Early life ==
Albert was born in Ansbach in Franconia as the third son of Frederick I, Margrave of Brandenburg-Ansbach. His mother was Sophia, daughter of Casimir IV Jagiellon, Grand Duke of Lithuania and king of Poland, and his wife Elisabeth of Austria. His great-grandfather was Władysław II Jagiełło, the last pagan ruler in Europe, who, after converting to Christianity, defeated the Teutonic Knights at the Battle of Grunwald in 1410. He was raised for a career in the Church and spent some time at the court of Hermann IV of Hesse, Elector of Cologne, who appointed him canon of the Cologne Cathedral. Not only was he quite religious, but he was also interested in mathematics and science and sometimes is claimed to have contradicted the teachings of the Church in favour of scientific theories. His career was forwarded by the Church; however, and institutions of the Catholic clerics supported his early advancement.

Turning to a more active life, Albert accompanied Emperor Maximilian I to Italy in 1508 and, after his return spent some time in the Kingdom of Hungary.

== Grand Master ==
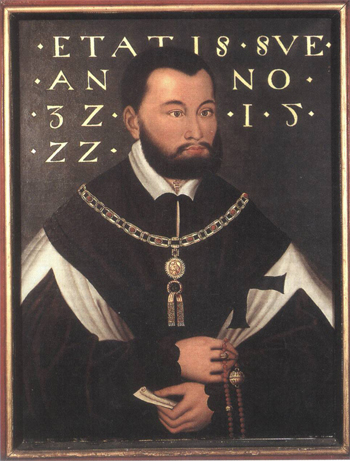
As grand master of the Teutonic Order, painting from 1522

Coat of arms as grand master of the Teutonic Order

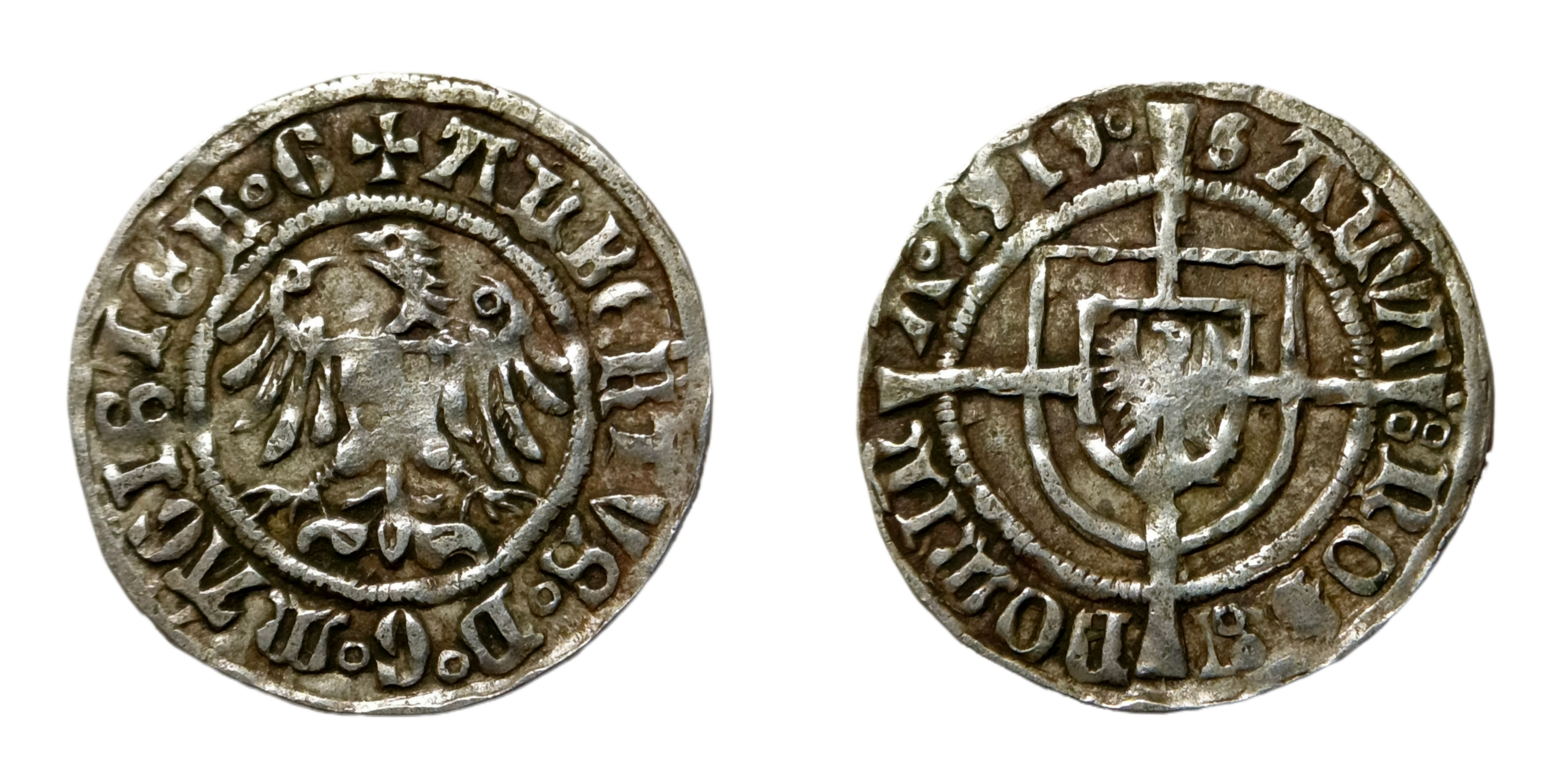
Groschen of the Grand Master of the Teutonic Order, Albert.

Duke Frederick of Saxony, grand master of the Teutonic Order, died in December 1510. Albert was chosen as his successor early in 1511 in the hope that his relationship to his maternal uncle, Sigismund I the Old, Grand Duke of Lithuania and king of Poland, would facilitate a settlement of the disputes over eastern Prussia, which had been held by the order under Polish suzerainty since the Second Peace of Thorn (1466).

The new grand master, aware of his duties to the empire and to the papacy, refused to submit to the crown of Poland. As war over the order's existence appeared inevitable, Albert made strenuous efforts to secure allies and carried on protracted negotiations with Emperor Maximilian I. The ill-feeling, influenced by the ravages of members of the Order in Poland, culminated in a war which began in December 1519 and devastated Prussia. Albert was granted a four-year truce early in 1521.

The dispute was referred to Emperor Charles V and other princes, but as no settlement was reached, Albert continued his efforts to obtain help in view of a renewal of the war. For this purpose, he visited the Diet of Nuremberg in 1522, where he made the acquaintance of the Reformer Andreas Osiander, by whose influence Albert was won over to Protestantism.

The grand master then journeyed to Wittenberg, where he was advised by Martin Luther to abandon the rules of his order, to marry, and to convert Prussia into a hereditary duchy for himself. This proposal, which was understandably appealing to Albert, had already been discussed by some of his relatives; but it was necessary to proceed cautiously, and he assured Pope Adrian VI that he was anxious to reform the order and punish the knights who had adopted Lutheran doctrines. Luther for his part, did not stop at the suggestion, but in order to facilitate the change, made special efforts to spread his teaching among the Prussians, while Albert's brother, Margrave George of Brandenburg-Ansbach, laid the scheme before their uncle, Sigismund I the Old of Poland.

== Duke in Prussia ==
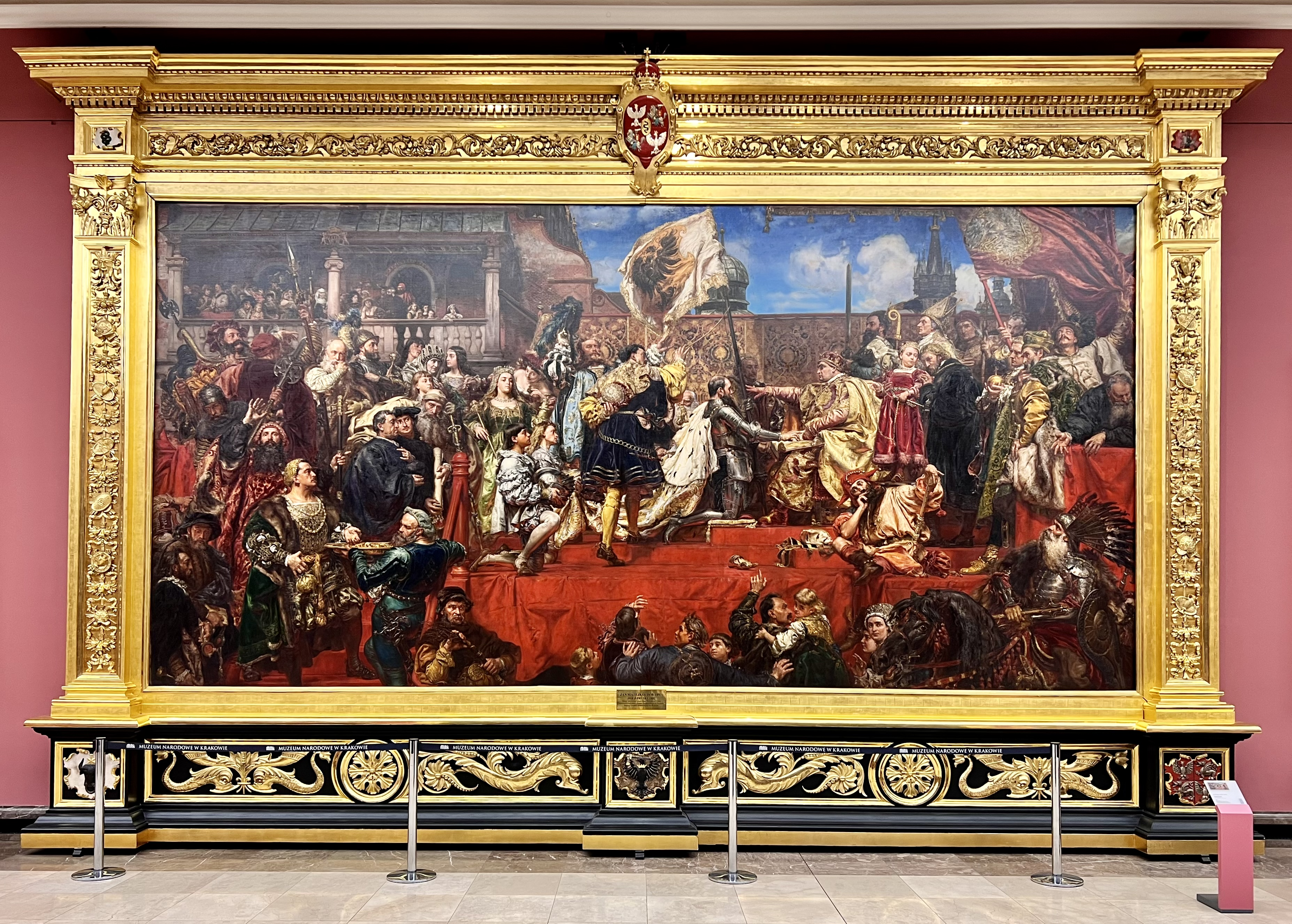
Prussian Homage: Albert and his brothers receive the Duchy of Prussia as a fief from Polish King Sigismund I the Old, 1525. Painting by Matejko, 1882.

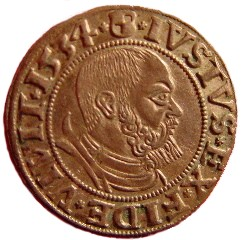
One Groschen coin, 1534, Iustus ex fide vivit — The Just lives on Faith

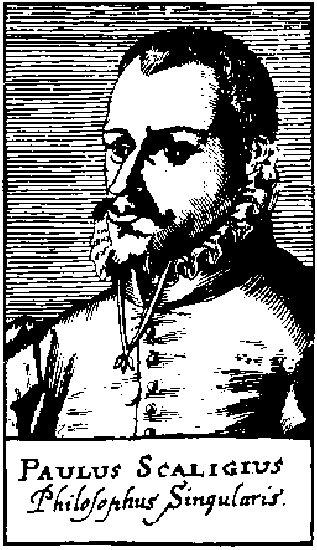
Portrait of Pavao Skalić, an encyclopedist, Renaissance humanist and adventurer from Croatia, who strongly influenced the Duke in the closing years of his reign

After some delay Sigismund assented to the offer, with the provision that Prussia should be treated as a Polish fiefdom; and after this arrangement had been confirmed by a treaty concluded at Kraków, Albert pledged a personal oath to Sigismund I and was invested with the duchy for himself and his heirs on 10 February 1525.

The Estates of the land then met at Königsberg and took the oath of allegiance to the new duke, who used his full powers to promote the doctrines of Luther. This transition did not, however, take place without protest. Summoned before the imperial court of justice, Albert refused to appear and was proscribed, while the order elected a new grand master, Walter von Cronberg, who received Prussia as a fief at the imperial Diet of Augsburg. As the German princes were experiencing the tumult of the Reformation, the German Peasants' War, and the wars against the Ottoman Turks, they did not enforce the ban on the duke, and agitation against him soon died away.

In imperial politics, Albert was fairly active. Joining the League of Torgau in 1526, he acted in unison with the Protestants and was among the princes who banded and plotted together to overthrow Charles V after the issue of the Augsburg Interim in May 1548. For various reasons, however, poverty and personal inclination, among others, he did not take a prominent part in the military operations of this period.

The early years of Albert's rule in Prussia were fairly prosperous. Although he had some trouble with the peasantry, the lands and treasures of the church enabled him to propitiate the nobles and, for a time, to provide for the expenses of the court. He did something for the furtherance of learning by establishing schools in every town and by freeing serfs who adopted a scholastic life. In 1544, in spite of some opposition, he founded Königsberg University, where he appointed his friend Andreas Osiander to a professorship in 1549. Albert also paid for the printing of the Astronomical "Prutenic Tables" compiled by Erasmus Reinhold and the first maps of Prussia by Caspar Hennenberger.

Osiander's appointment was the beginning of the troubles which clouded the closing years of Albert's reign. Osiander's divergence from Luther's doctrine of justification by faith involved him in a violent quarrel with Philip Melanchthon, who had adherents in Königsberg, and these theological disputes soon created an uproar in the town. The duke strenuously supported Osiander, and the area of the quarrel soon broadened. There were no longer church lands available with which to conciliate the nobles, the burden of taxation was heavy, and Albert's rule became unpopular.

After Osiander's death in 1552, Albert favoured a preacher named Johann Funck, who, with an adventurer named Paul Skalić, exercised great influence over him and obtained considerable wealth at public expense. The state of turmoil caused by these religious and political disputes was increased by the possibility of Albert's early death and the need, should that happen, to appoint a regent, as his only son, Albert Frederick, was still a mere youth. The duke was forced to consent to a condemnation of the teaching of Osiander, and the climax came in 1566 when the Estates appealed to King Sigismund II Augustus of Poland, Albert's cousin, who sent a commission to Königsberg. Skalić saved his life by flight, but Funck was executed. The question of the regency was settled, and a form of Lutheranism was adopted and declared binding on all teachers and preachers.

Virtually deprived of power, the duke lived for two more years and died at Tapiau on 20 March 1568 of the plague, along with his wife. Cornelis Floris de Vriendt designed his tomb within Königsberg Cathedral.

Albert was a voluminous letter writer and corresponded with many of the leading personages of the time.

== Legacy ==
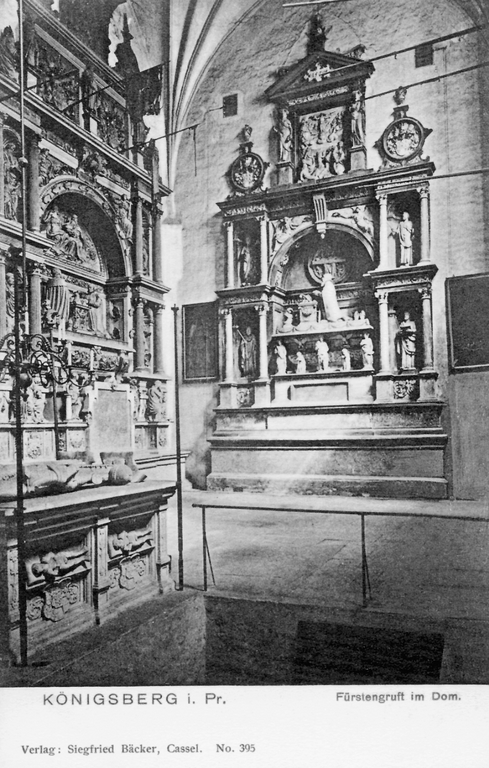
Tomb of Albert by Cornelis Floris de Vriendt in Königsberg Cathedral

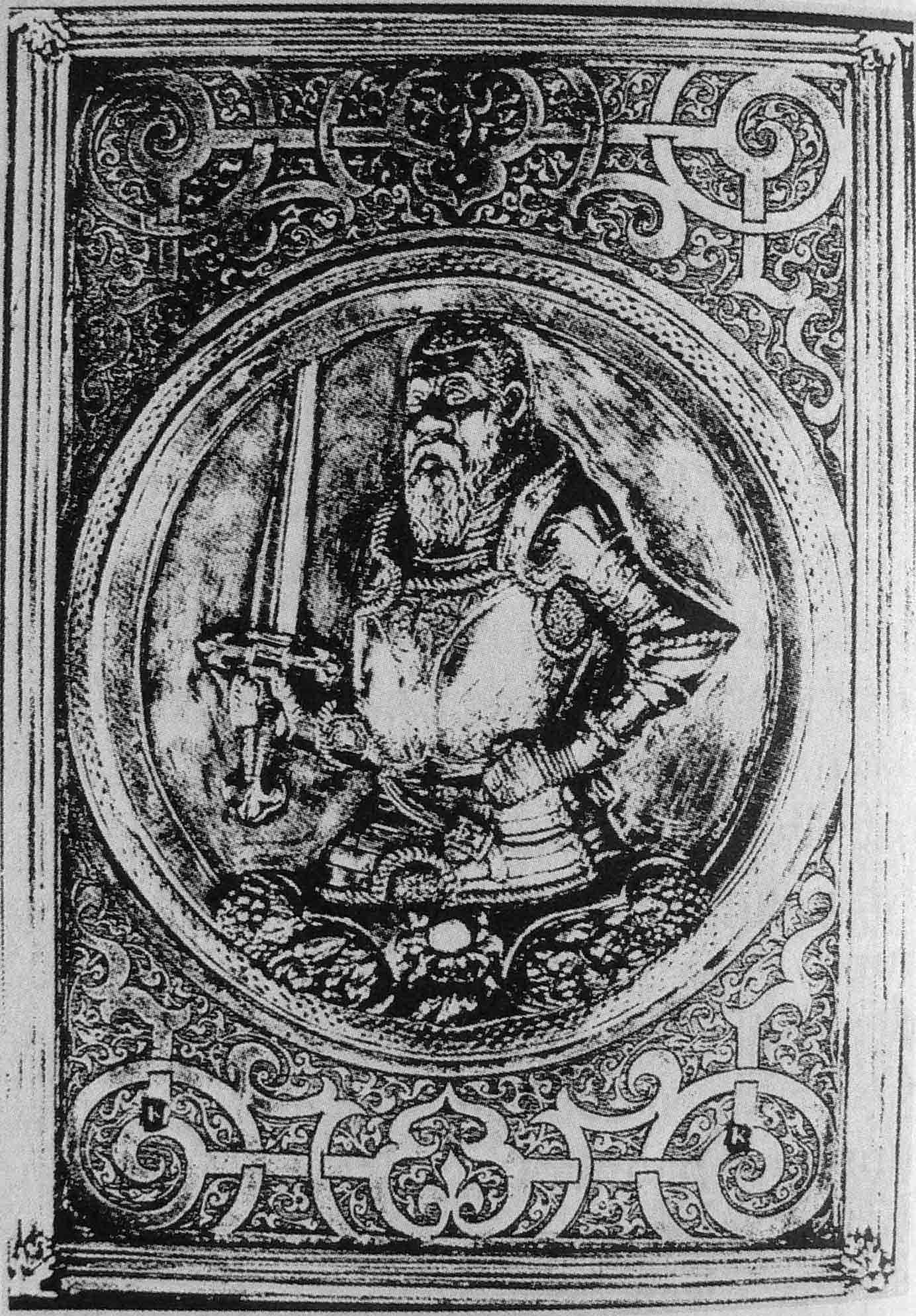
"Albertus" with sword from the Silberbibliothek

Albert was the first German noble to support Luther's ideas and in 1544 founded the University of Königsberg, the Albertina, as a rival to the Roman Catholic Krakow Academy. It was the second Lutheran university in the German states, after the University of Marburg.

A relief of Albert over the Renaissance-era portal of Königsberg Castle's southern wing was created by Andreas Hess in 1551 according to plans by Christoph Römer. Another relief by an unknown artist was included in the wall of the Albertina's original campus. This depiction, which showed the duke with his sword over his shoulder, was the popular "Albertus", the symbol of the university. The original was moved to Königsberg Public Library to protect it from the elements, while the sculptor Paul Kimritz created a duplicate for the wall. Another version of the "Albertus" by Lothar Sauer was included at the entrance of the Königsberg State and Royal Library.

In 1880, Friedrich Reusch created a sandstone bust of Albert at the Regierungsgebäude, the administrative building for Regierungsbezirk Königsberg. On 19 May 1891 Reusch premiered a famous statue of Albert at Königsberg Castle with the inscription: "Albert of Brandenburg, Last Grand Master, First Duke in Prussia". Albert Wolff also designed an equestrian statue of Albert located at the new campus of the Albertina. King's Gate contains a statue of Albert.

Albert was often honoured in the quarter Maraunenhof in northern Königsberg. Its main street was named Herzog-Albrecht-Allee in 1906. Its town square, König-Ottokar-Platz, was renamed Herzog-Albrecht-Platz in 1934 to match its church, the Herzog-Albrecht-Gedächtniskirche.

== Spouse and issue ==
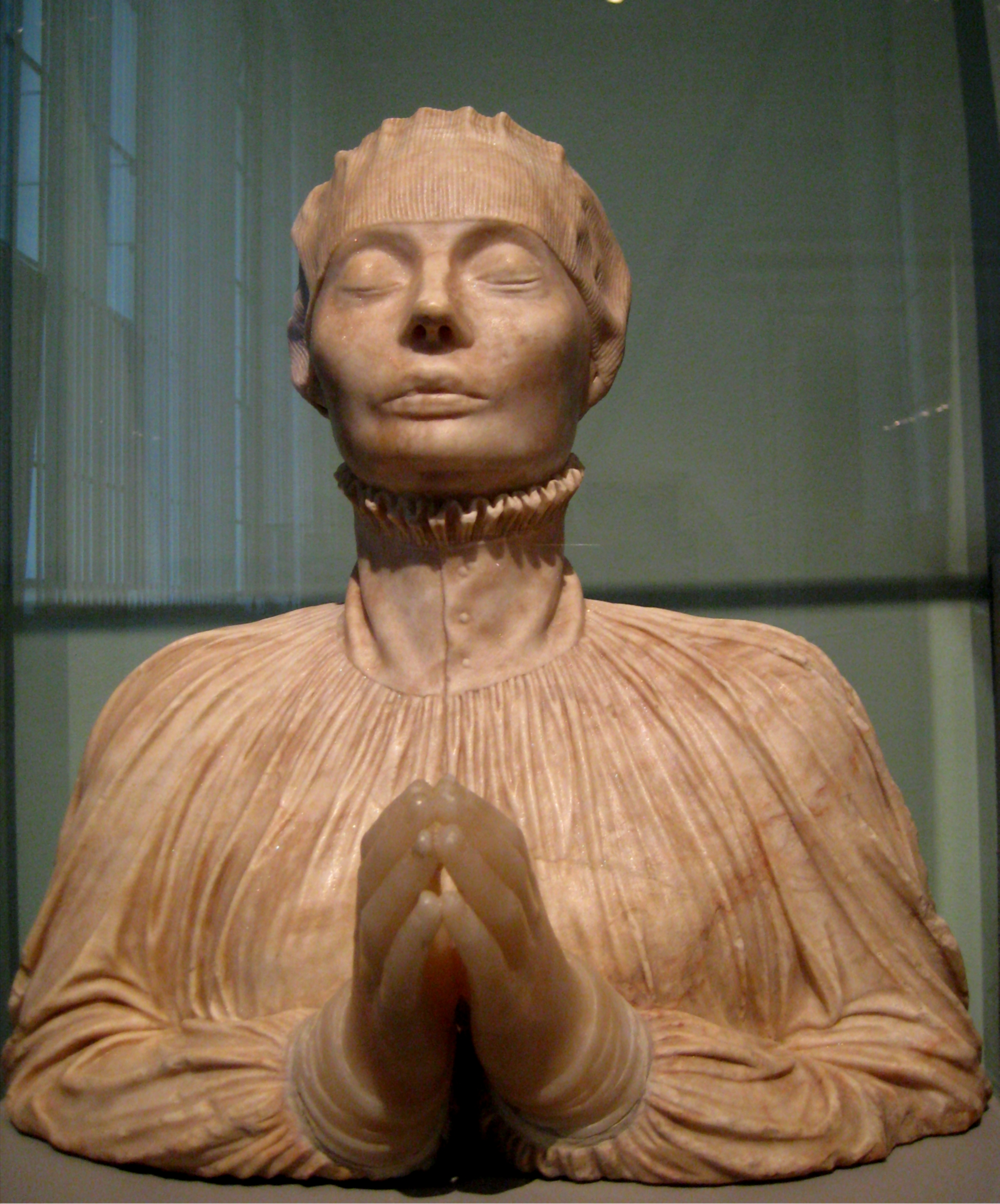
Dorothea of Denmark, Duchess of Prussia by Cornelis Floris de Vriendt

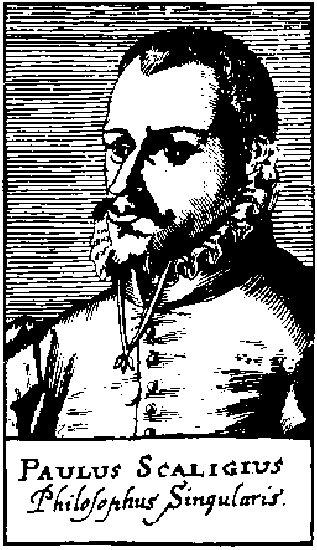
Portrait of Pavao Skalić, an encyclopedist, Renaissance humanist and adventurer from Croatia, who strongly influenced the Duke in the closing years of his reign

Albert married first, to Dorothea (1 August 1504 – 11 April 1547), daughter of King Frederick I of Denmark, in 1526. They had six children:

- Anna Sophia (11 June 1527 – 6 February 1591), married John Albert I, Duke of Mecklenburg-Güstrow;
- Katharina (b. and d. 24 February 1528), died at birth;
- Frederick Albert (5 December 1529 – 1 January 1530), died young;
- Lucia Dorothea (8 April 1531 – 1 February 1532), died in infancy;
- Lucia (3 February 1537 – 1 May 1539), died young;
- Albert (b. and d. 1 March 1539) died at birth.

He married secondly to Anna Maria (1532–20 March 1568), daughter of Eric I, Duke of Brunswick-Lüneburg, in 1550. The couple had two children:

- Elisabeth (20 May 1551 – 19 February 1596) died unmarried and without issue.
- Albert Frederick (29 April 1553 – 18 August 1618), Duke of Prussia.

== Bibliography ==
- Albinus, Robert (1985). Lexikon der Stadt Königsberg Pr. und Umgebung (in German). Leer: Verlag Gerhard Rautenberg. p. 371. ISBN 3-7921-0320-6.
- Mühlpfordt, Herbert Meinhard (1963). Welche Mitbürger hat Königsberg öffentlich geehrt? (in German). Würzburg: Holzner Verlag.
- Ward, A. W.; Prothero, G. W.; Leathes, Stanley, eds. (1934). The Cambridge Modern History. Vol. XIII. Cambridge University Press.

Albert, Duke of Prussia House of Brandenburg-Ansbach Cadet branch of the House of Hohenzollern Born: 16 May 1490 Died: 20 March 1568
Regnal titles
Preceded by Duke Frederick of Saxony	Grand Master of the Teutonic Knights; 1510–1525	Succeeded by Walter von Cronberg
New creation Secularisation of the Monastic state of the Teutonic Knights	Duke of Prussia; 1525–1568	Succeeded by Albert Frederick
