= John Albert I =

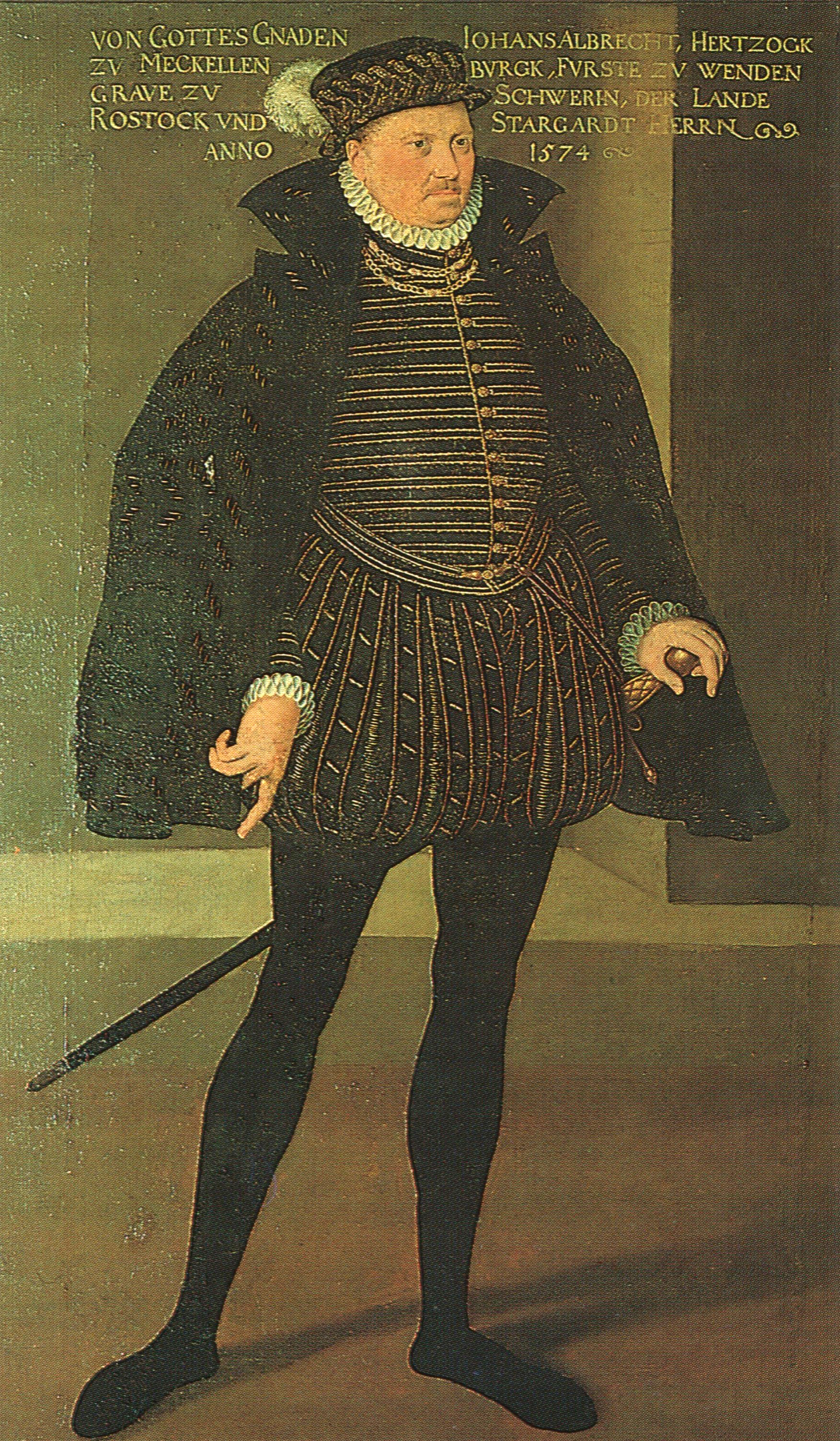
- Portrait by Peter Boeckel, 1574

Duke of Mecklenburg-Schwerin
- Reign: 6 February 1552 - 12 February 1576
- Predecessor: Henry V
- Successor: John VII
- Co-Ruler: Philip (1552-1557)

Duke of Mecklenburg-Güstrow
- Reign: 7 January 1547 - 17 February 1555
- Predecessor: Albrecht VII
- Successor: Ulrich III
- Born: 23 December 1525; Güstrow
- Died: 12 February 1576 (aged 50); Schwerin
- Spouse: Anna Sophia of Prussia (m. 1555)
- Issue: John VII, Duke of Mecklenburg-Schwerin
- House: House of Mecklenburg
- Father: Albrecht VII, Duke of Mecklenburg
- Mother: Anne of Brandenburg

John Albert I, in older literature known as John or Johann (23 December 1525 – 12 February 1576), was the reigning duke of Mecklenburg-Güstrow from 1547 to 1556 and of Mecklenburg-Schwerin from 1556 to 1576. In 1549, John Albert I saw to it that the parliament of Mecklenburg carried through the Reformation for the entire duchy.

== Biography ==
John Albert was born in Güstrow, the eldest son of the Duke Albrecht VII of Mecklenburg-Güstrow and his wife Anne of Brandenburg. Until the age of 13, he was educated by the "papist vicar" Johann Sperling. In 1539, his father sent him to the court of his uncle, the protestant Elector Joachim II of Brandenburg, where he was educated together with the Elector's son and John Albert's cousin John George. From 1541 to 1544, they attended the newly founded University of Frankfurt an der Oder together. John Albert was a devout supporter of Protestantism when he returned to Mecklenburg. Nevertheless, he fought on the imperial side in the Schmalkaldic War, at his father's request.

When his father died in 1547, John Albert and his brothers Ulrich III and George were jointly invested with the Duchy of Mecklenburg-Güstrow by Emperor Charles V. Initially, John Albert administered the Mecklenburg-Güstrow part of the Duchy alone, while Ulrich administered the Bishopric of Schwerin from 1550 as successor to his cousin Magnus III and George fought in the Schmalkaldic War and fell in 1552 before Frankfurt am Main.

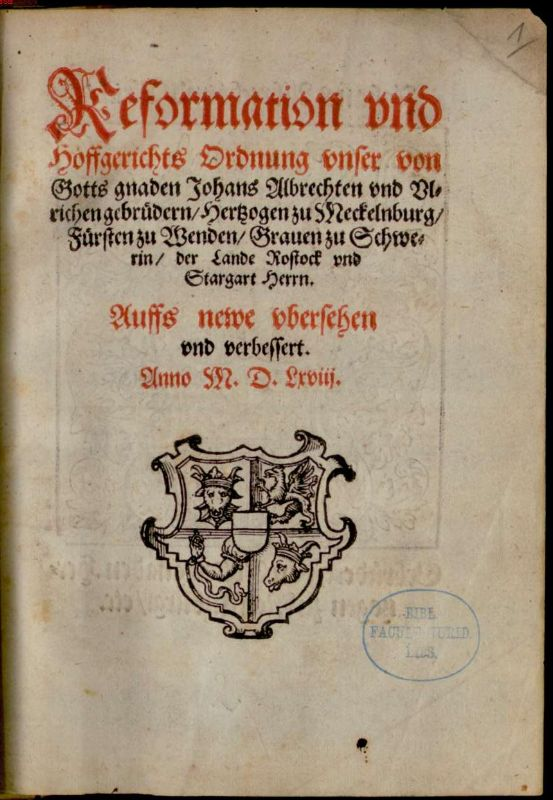
Reformation and Court Order' of 1568 by John Albert I

As a convinced adherent of Protestantism John Albert I, unlike his father, decided to back the introduction the Reformation in his lands. In 1549 he presided over a meeting of the Estates in Sternberg, which prescribed the Lutheran faith for all parts of Mecklenburg. This can be seen as the official introduction of Lutheranism as the state religion in Mecklenburg. In February 1550, he concluded a defensive alliance with Margrave John of Brandenburg-Küstrin and Duke Albert of Prussia, to whose daughter, Anna Sophia, he was engaged and later married. On 22 May 1551, John Albert concluded the secret Treaty of Torgau with the other Protestant princes in northern Germany. This treaty formed the legal framework for the Princes' rebellion of 1552 against Emperor Charles V, in which John Albert I participated.

His uncle Henry V, who ruled Mecklenburg-Schwerin, died in 1552 without a male heir. When John Albert's brother Ulrich then claimed the inheritance, the Emperor objected. A violent inheritance dispute erupted. Ulrich forced John Albert to consent to the Treaty of Wismar of 11 March 1555. The dispute was finally resolved in 1556 by the Edict of Ruppin by Elector Joachim II of Brandenburg. This edict made John Albert I regent of the western part of Mecklenburg, while Ulrich received the eastern part, the former Lordship of Werle, while maintaining a common state government. Ulrich chose Güstrow as his residence.

Duke John Albert was considered a modern Renaissance prince and a patron of the arts and sciences, with an open mind for the scientific discoveries of his time. He committed himself to the Reformation and modernized the state. He possessed an extensive library, which eventually came into the possession of the University of Rostock. He was interested in scientific instruments and in astronomy and cartography. He employed Tilemann Stella as his court librarian and cartographer. They jointly visited the imperial court in Vienna, where they studied architecture and modern fortification techniques, which they subsequently applied in Mecklenburg. The Ducal Court in Wismar and the expansion of various ducal castles and modern fortifications date back to John Albert's intentions, although he did not always have sufficient resources to finance his efforts. Among his major achievements are the creation of several high schools: in Güstrow in 1552, in Schwerin in 1553 and in Parchim in 1554. He died in Schwerin.

== Marriage and issue ==
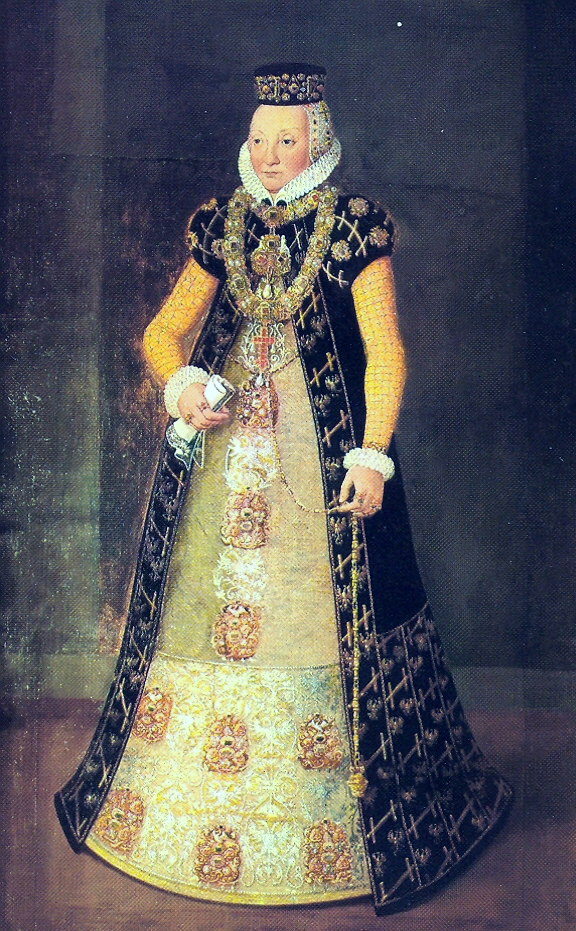
Princess Anna Sophia of Brandenburg

On 24 February 1555 he married Anna Sophia of Prussia (11 June 1527 – 6 February 1591), the daughter of Duke Albert of Prussia. The couple had three children:

- Albert (1556–1561), Duke of Mecklenburg
- John VII (* 1558, † 1592), Duke of Mecklenburg-Schwerin from 1576 to 1592
- Sigismund August, Duke of Mecklenburg (1560–1600), married Clara Maria of Pomerania-Barth

John Albert I House of Mecklenburg Born: 23 December 1525 Died: 12 February 1576
Preceded by Albrecht VII	Duke of Mecklenburg-Güstrow; 1547–1556	Succeeded by Ulrich III
Preceded by Henry V	Duke of Mecklenburg-Schwerin; 1556–1576	Succeeded by John VII
