= Güstrow =

Town in Mecklenburg-Vorpommern, Germany

- Town
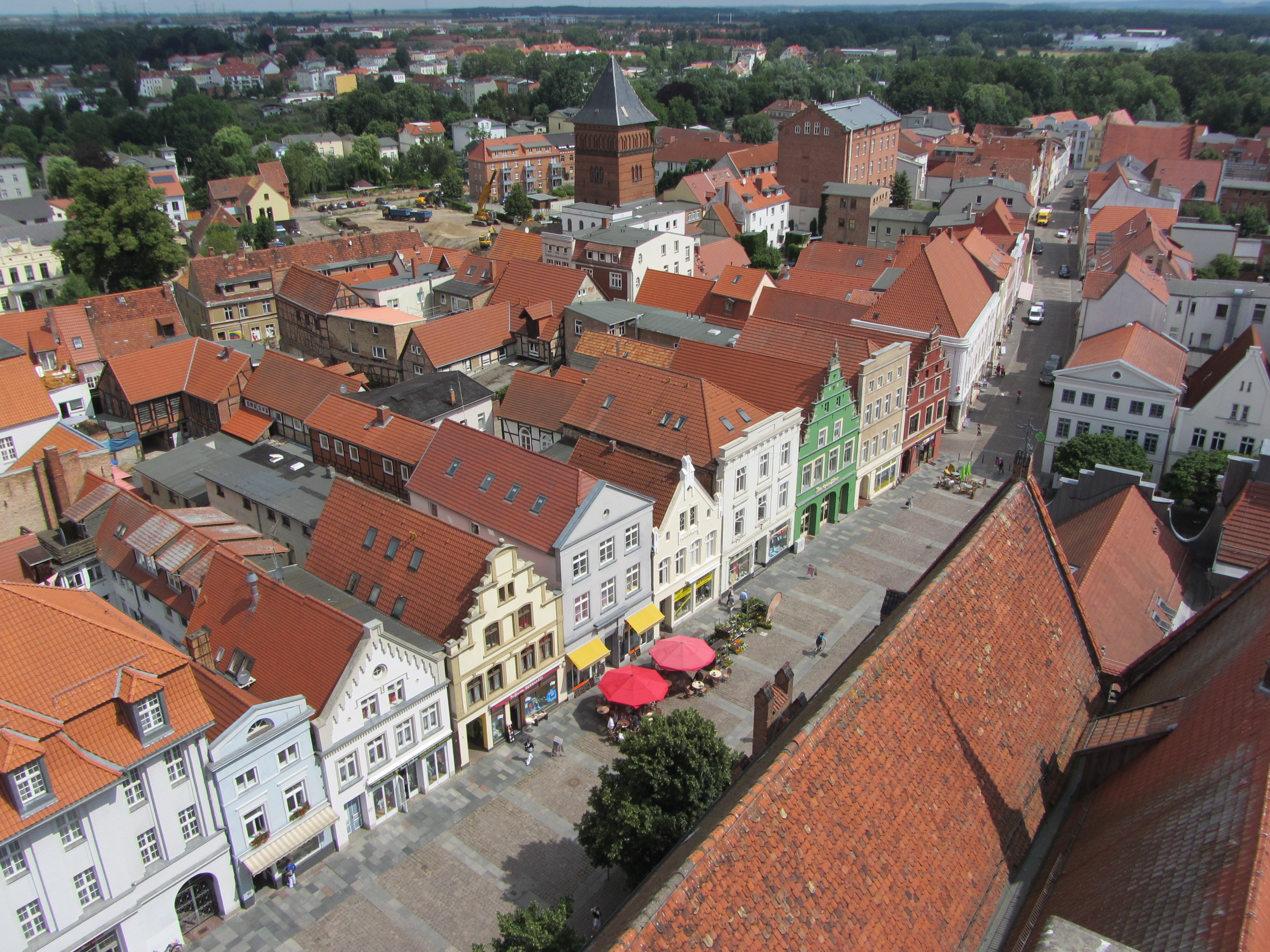
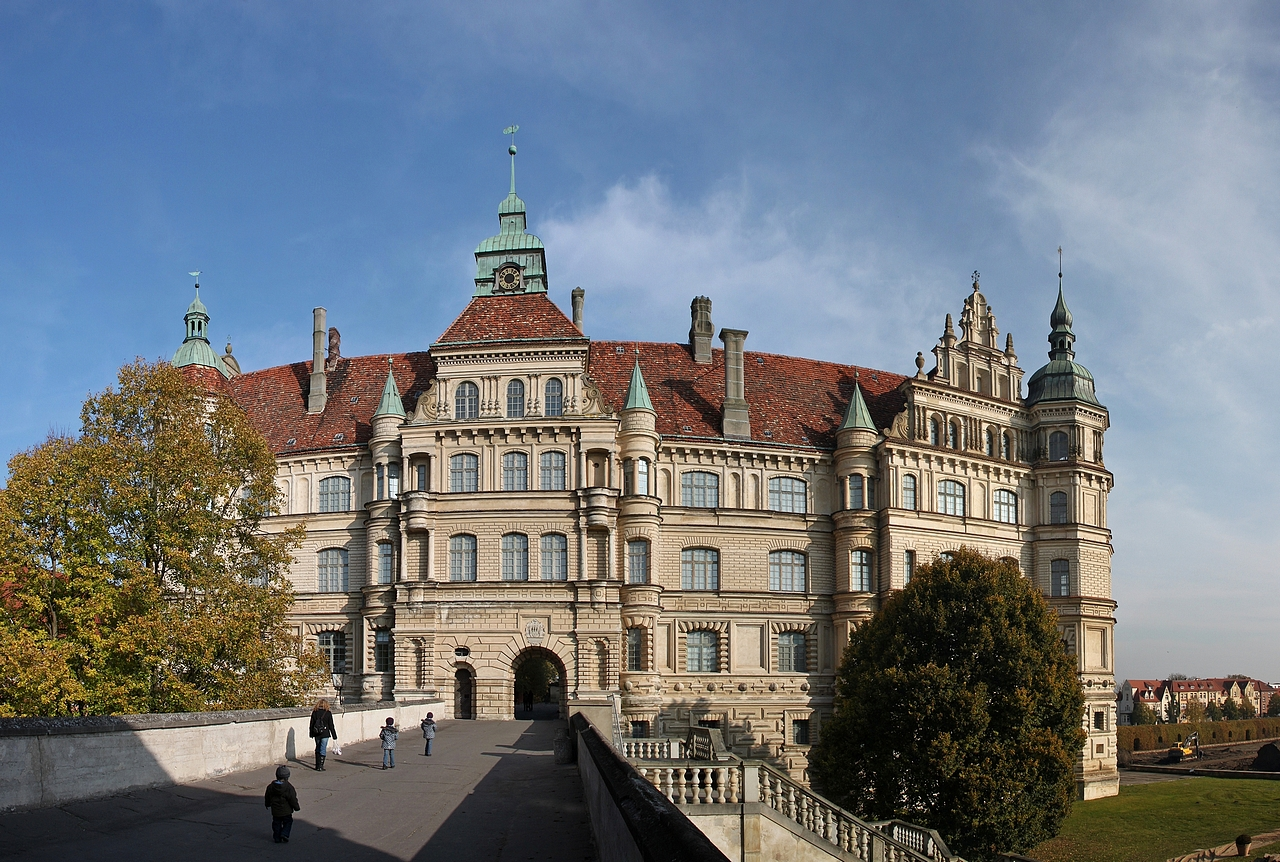
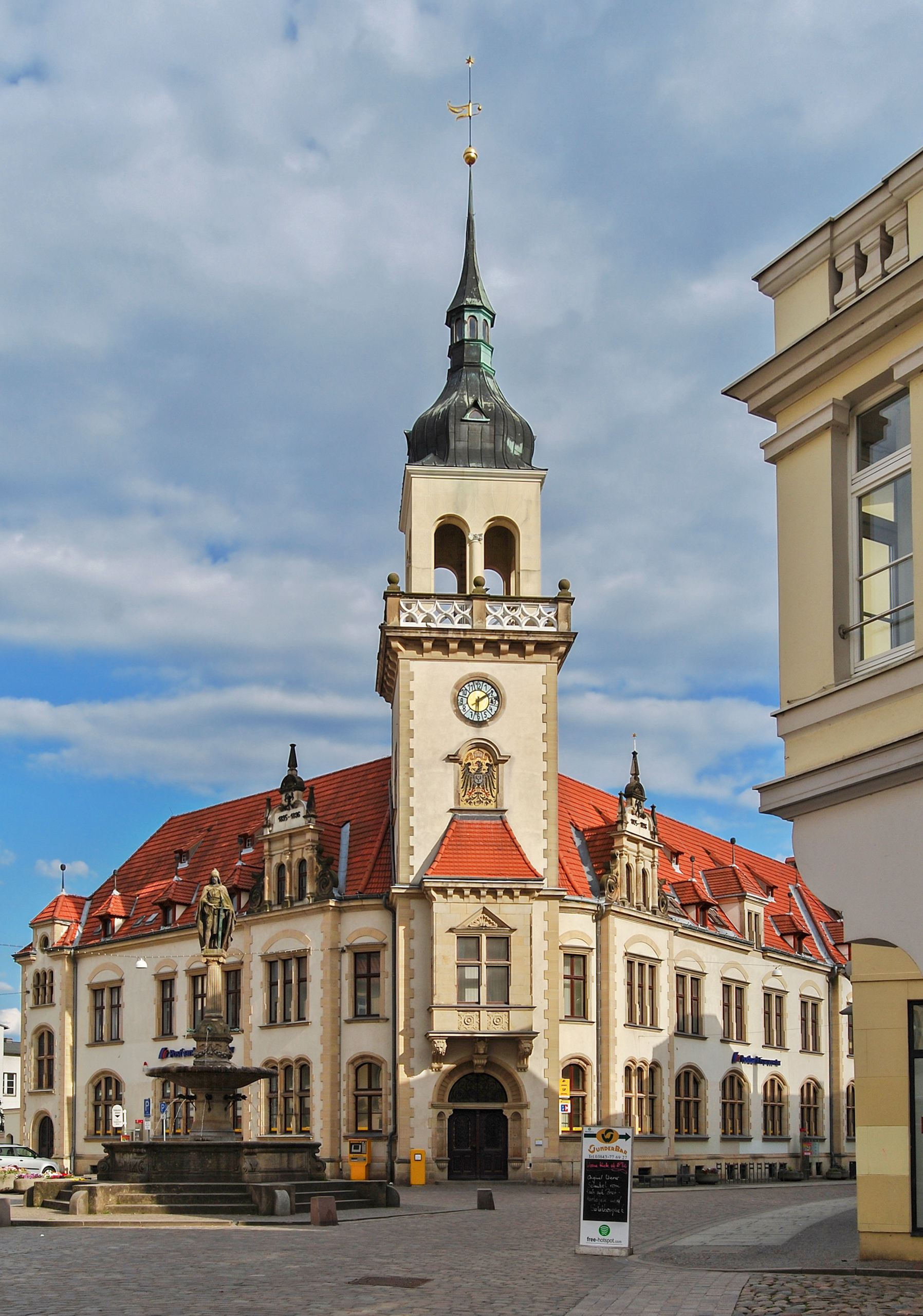
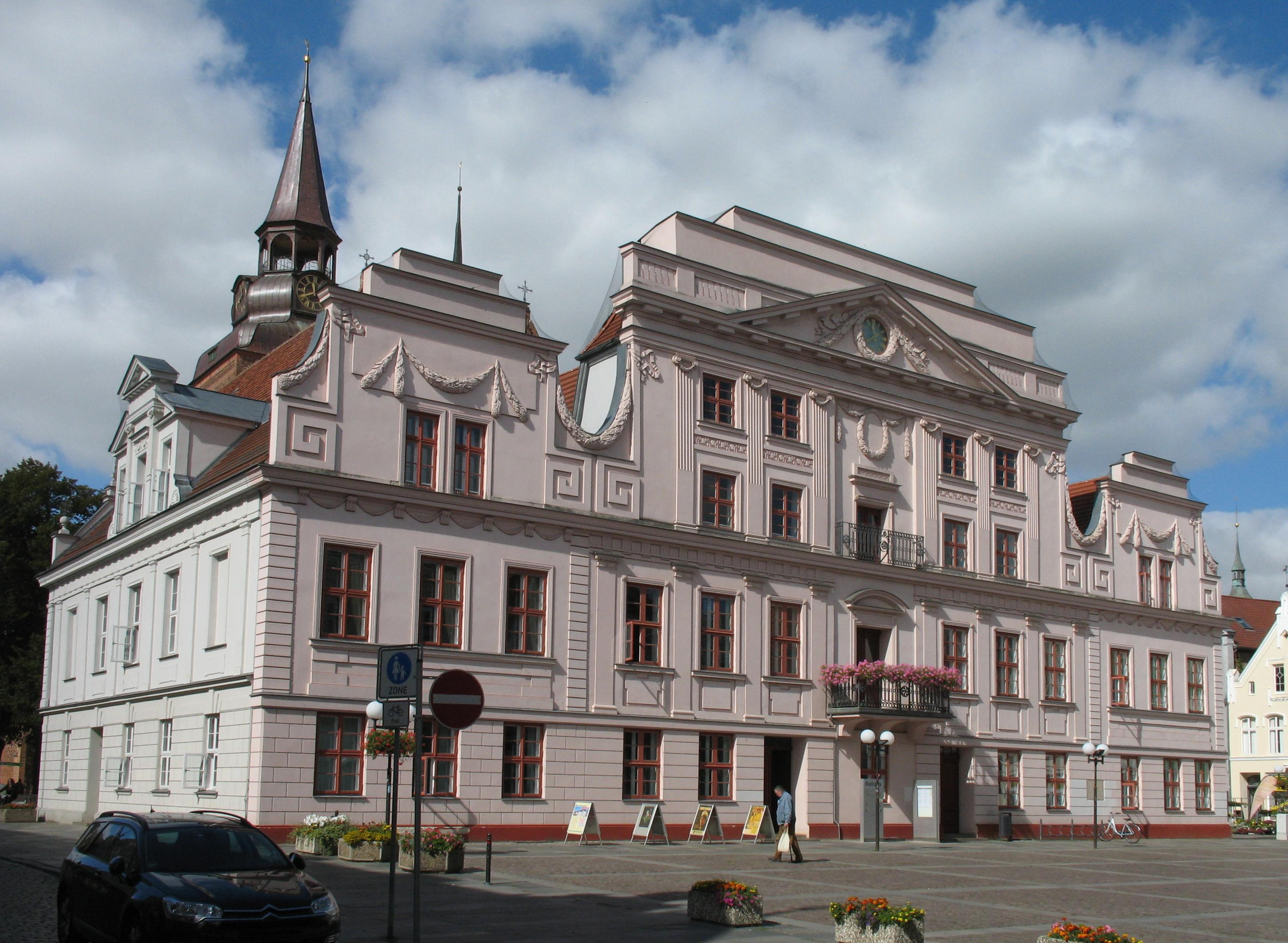
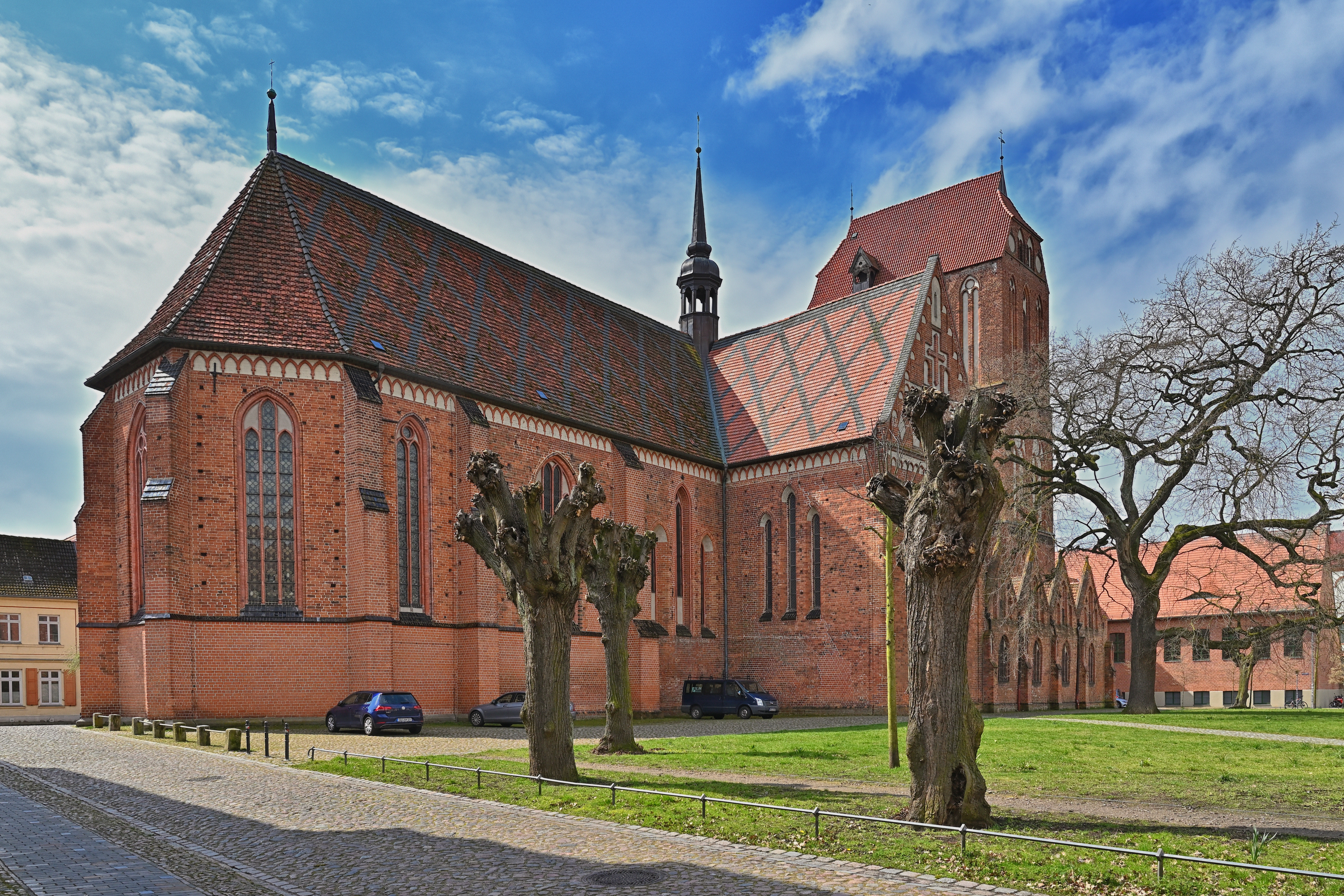
- Market Square Güstrow Palace Post Office Town Hall Güstrow Dom

- Flag Coat of arms

- Location of Güstrow within Rostock district
- Interactive map of Güstrow
- Location within Germany Location within Mecklenburg-Vorpommern
- Coordinates: 53°47′38″N 12°10′35″E
- Country: Germany
- State: Mecklenburg-Vorpommern
- District: Rostock

Government
  - Mayor: Arne Schuldt (Ind.)

Area
  - Total: 71.09 km^{2} (27.45 sq mi)
- Elevation: 14 m (46 ft)

Population (2025-12-31)
  - Total: 28,861
  - Density: 406.0/km^{2} (1,051/sq mi)
- Time zone: UTC+01:00 (CET)
  - Summer (DST): UTC+02:00 (CEST)
- Postal codes: 18273
- Dialling codes: 03843
- Vehicle registration: LRO
- Website: www.guestrow.de

Güstrow (German: [ˈɡʏstʁoː]; Latin: Gustrovium) is a town in Mecklenburg-Vorpommern in north-eastern Germany. It is capital of the Rostock district; Rostock itself is a district-free city and regiopolis.

It has a population of 28,999 (2020) and is the seventh largest town in Mecklenburg-Western Pomerania. Since 2006 Güstrow has had the official suffix Barlachstadt.

The town is known for its renaissance Güstrow Palace, the old town and its brick gothic cathedral with Ernst Barlach's Floating Angel sculpture.

== Geography ==
Güstrow is 45 kilometers south of Rostock at the Nebel, an arm of the Warnow. The Bützow-Güstrow-Kanal (channel) is a navigable connection to the Warnow and used by tourists. There are five lakes (Inselsee, Sumpfsee, Parumer See, Grundloser See and Gliner See) and several forests around Güstrow.

== History ==
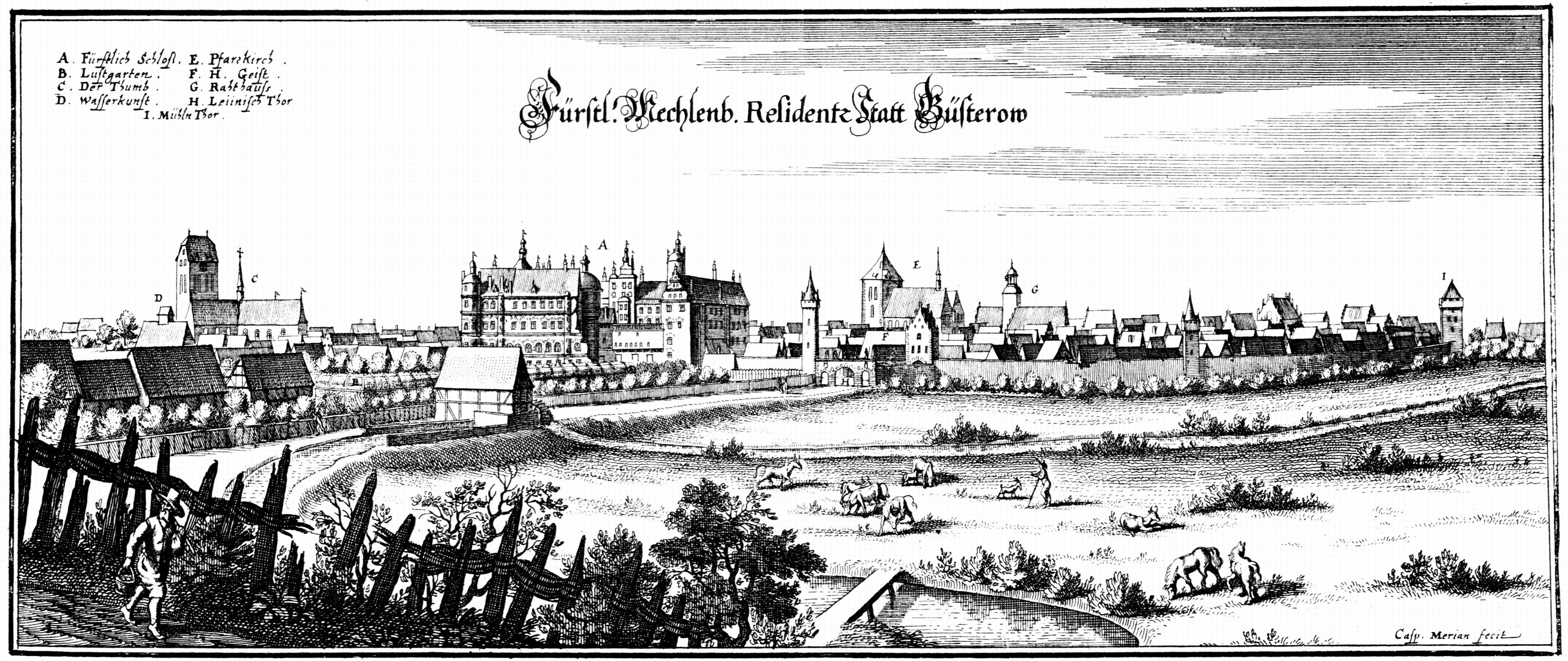
17th-century view of the town

The name Güstrow comes from the Polabian Guščerov and means lizard place.

In 1219 the Wendish castle Güstrowe was built where the renaissance palace stands now. Güstrow is said to be founded by Heinrich Borwin II, a grandson of Henry the Lion, between 1219 and 1226 and was first mentioned in 1228 in the deed of city rights of Schwerin, confirmed by the sons of Heinrich Borwin II, who donated the cathedral as collegiate church in 1226. Güstrow was a residence of the lords of Werle from 1229 until 1436. In 1441 the first privileged shooting society of Güstrow was founded.

The host desecration-trial of 1330 ended with the burning of 23 Jews and the destruction of the synagogue. The Kapelle des heiligen Bluts (Chapel of the Holy Blood) was built on the site of the synagogue. In 1503, 1508 and in 1512 fires destroyed the town and in 1556 the palace burned down.

After the division of Mecklenburg (1621) it became the capital of the small Duchy of Mecklenburg-Güstrow. (Albrecht von Wallenstein, the imperial general in the Thirty Years' War, was a duke of Mecklenburg-Güstrow.)

In 1695 the last duke of Mecklenburg-Güstrow died, and the duchy ceased to exist. Güstrow became a part of the Duchy of Mecklenburg-Schwerin.

The famous sculptor Ernst Barlach lived in Güstrow from 1910 to his death in 1938.

During World War II, Güstrow was the location of a labour camp of the Reich Labour Service, a Gestapo-operated prison and a forced labour subcamp of the prison in Dreibergen. After the war, it formed part of East Germany.

== Sights ==
There are several notable sights in Güstrow:

- The Güstrow Palace (or Schloss Güstrow in German), built in 1589 in Renaissance style, as a residence for the dukes of Mecklenburg. One of the most important works of this era in the Baltic Sea region. Between 1963 and 1981 major restoration work was carried out, and a Renaissance garden was added, modelled after descriptions appearing in old engravings.
- Güstrow Cathedral, a Brick Gothic cathedral built between 1226 and 1335. Noteworthy are a late Gothic high altar (c. 1500), the tombs of Duke Ulrich III and his two wives (16th century), and the celebrated Schwebende Engel ("Hovering Angel"), the most famous work of the expressionist sculptor Ernst Barlach, created in 1926 as a tribute to the victims of World War I.
- St. Mary's church, a Brick Gothic parish church, partly remodelled in the 19th century
- Ernst Barlach's Atelierhaus (studio), that exhibits a large collection of his works.
- The town hall, originally built in the 13th century and rebuilt c. 1800 at the central market square.

== Gallery ==
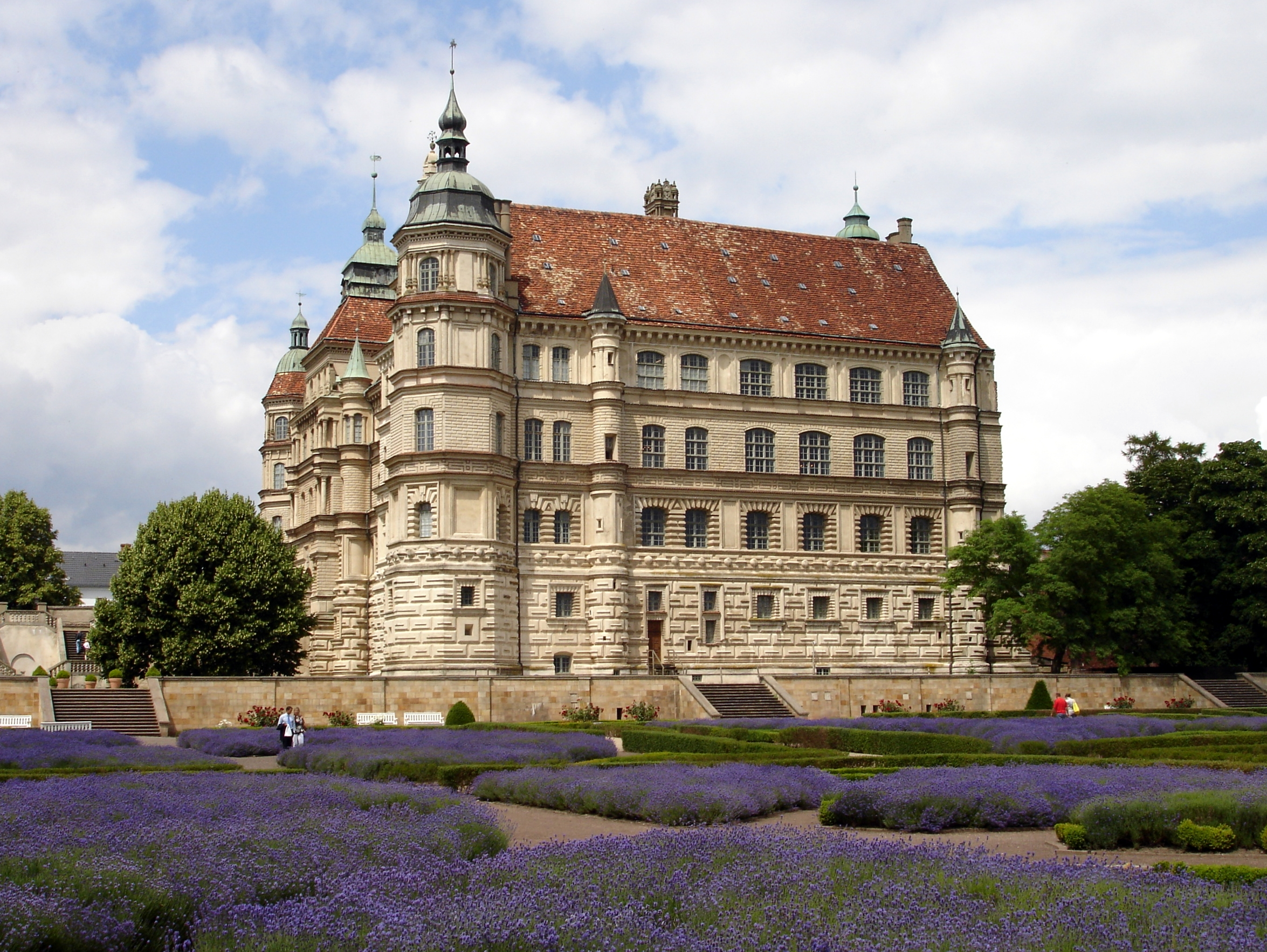
Renaissance Güstrow Palace

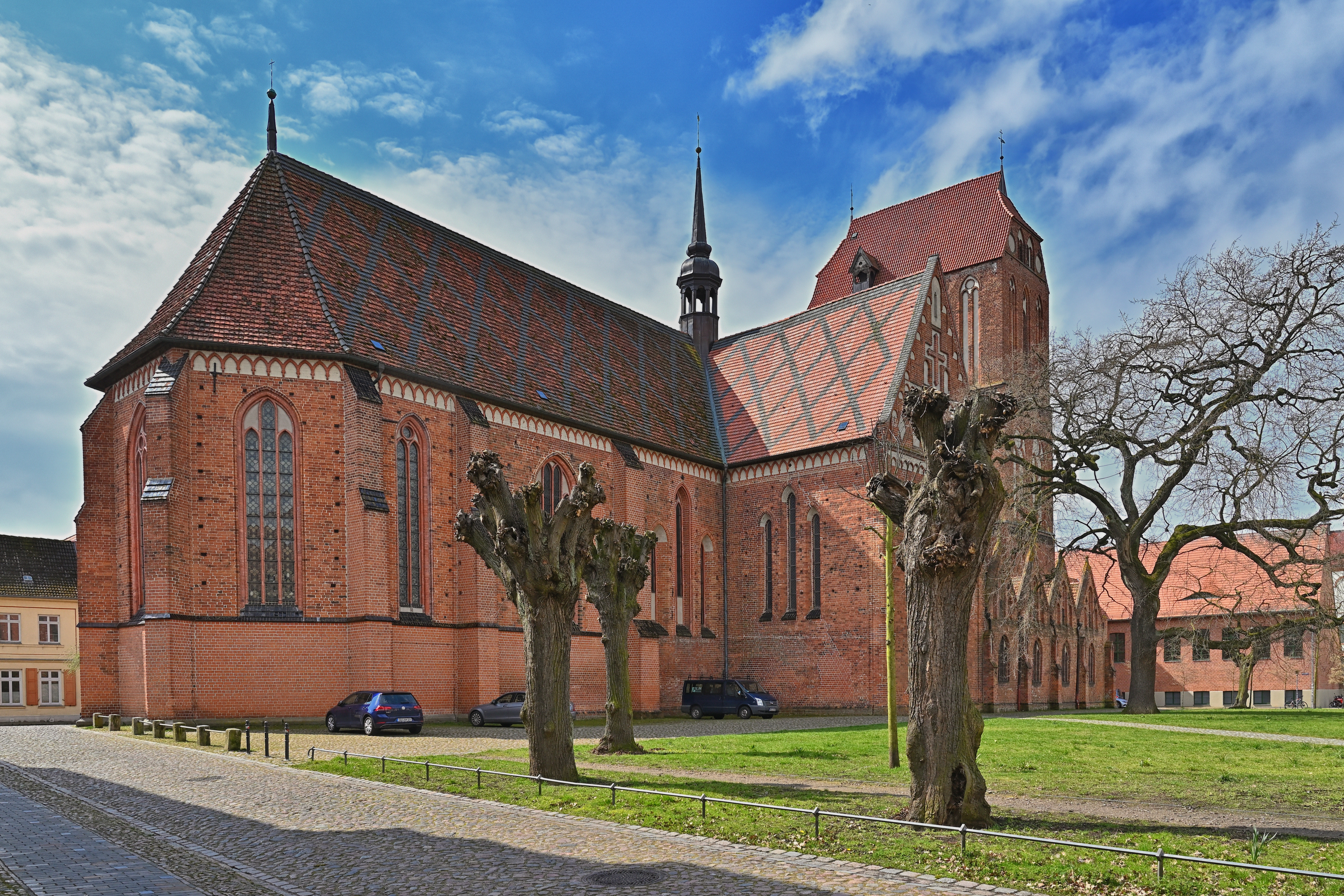
Brick Gothic Güstrow Cathedral

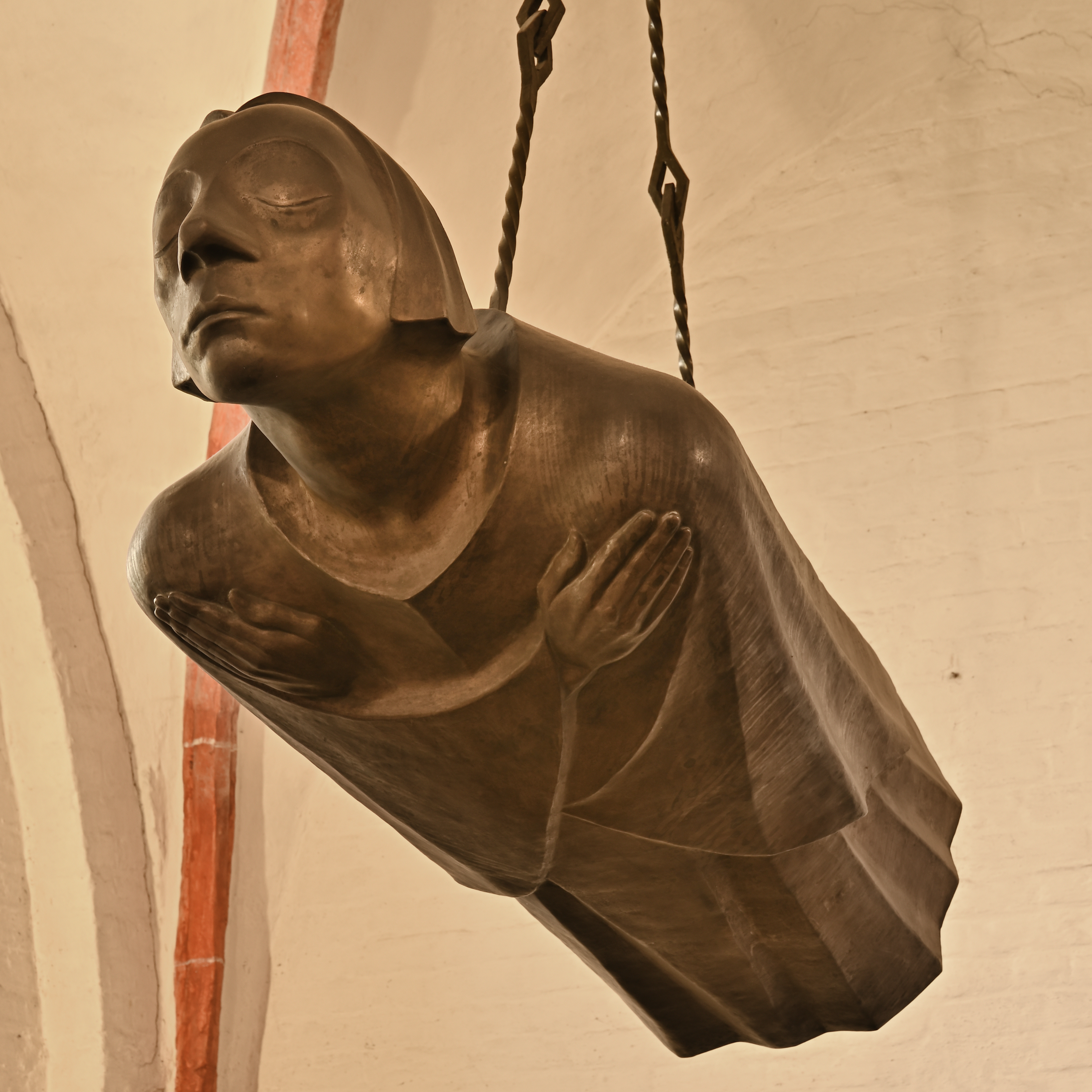
Floating Angel by Ernst Barlach, 1927 expressionist WW1 memorial in the Cathedral

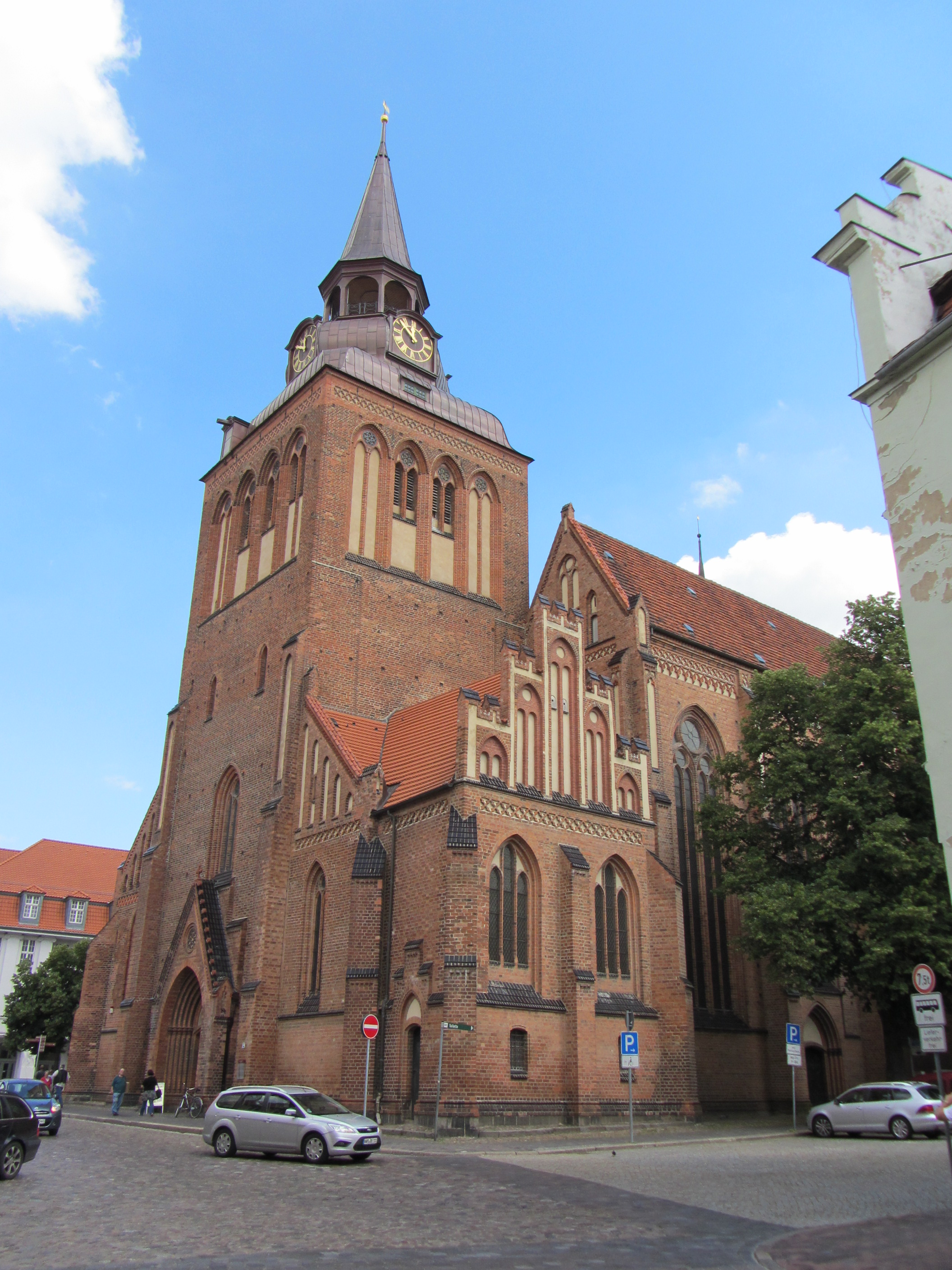
St. Mary's Parish Church

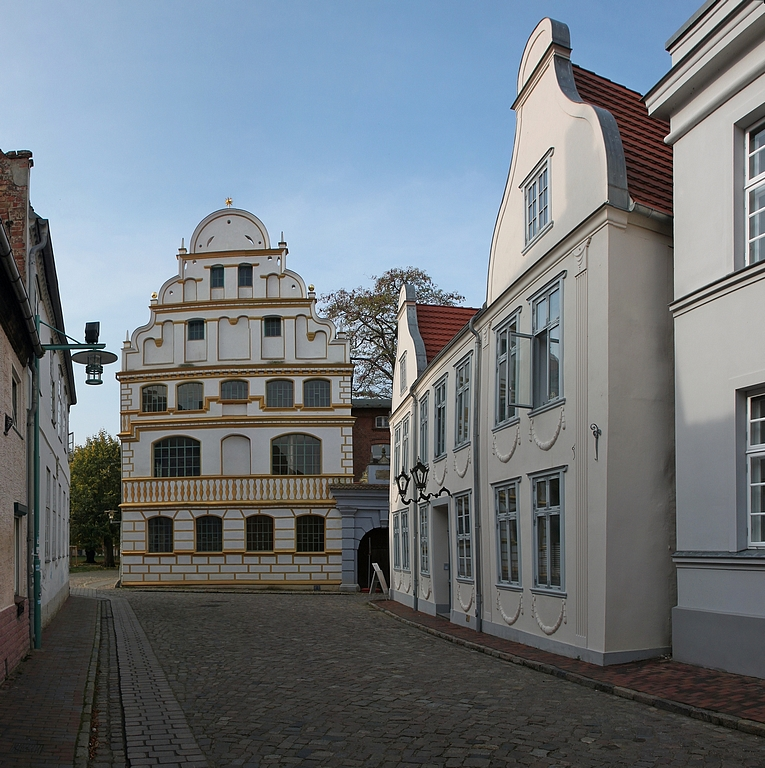
Cathedral School (Domschule)

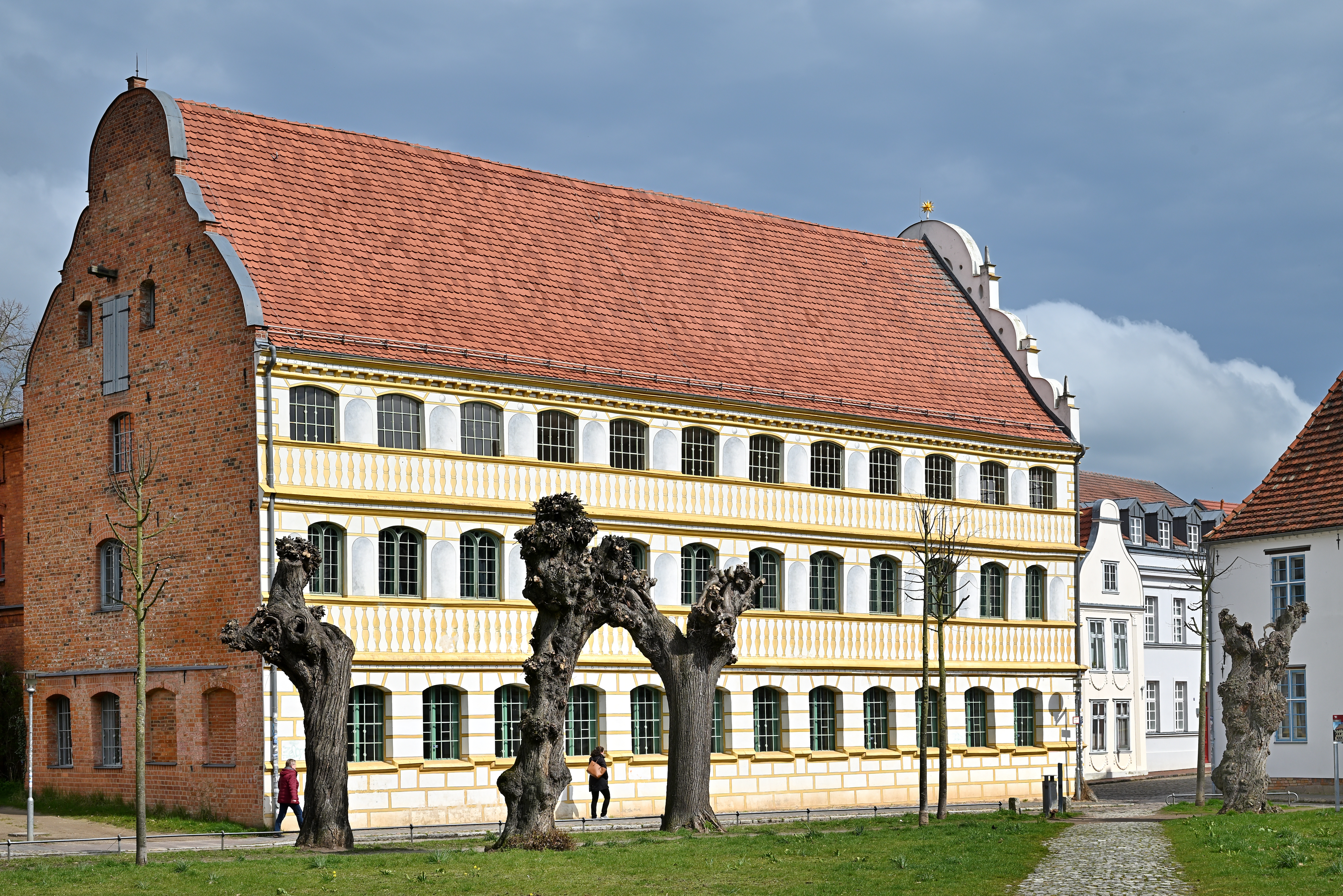
Cathedral school

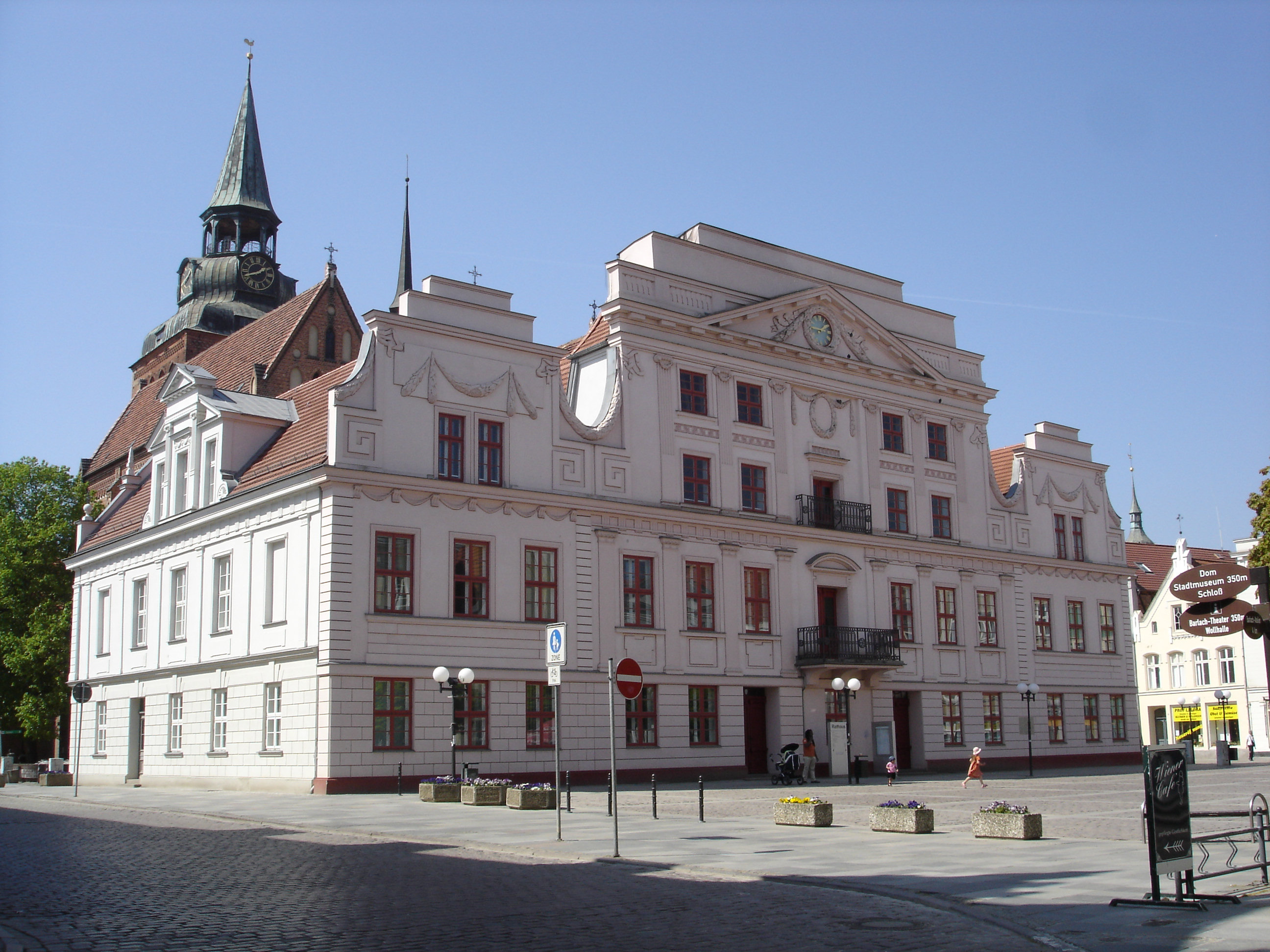
City Hall at the Market Square

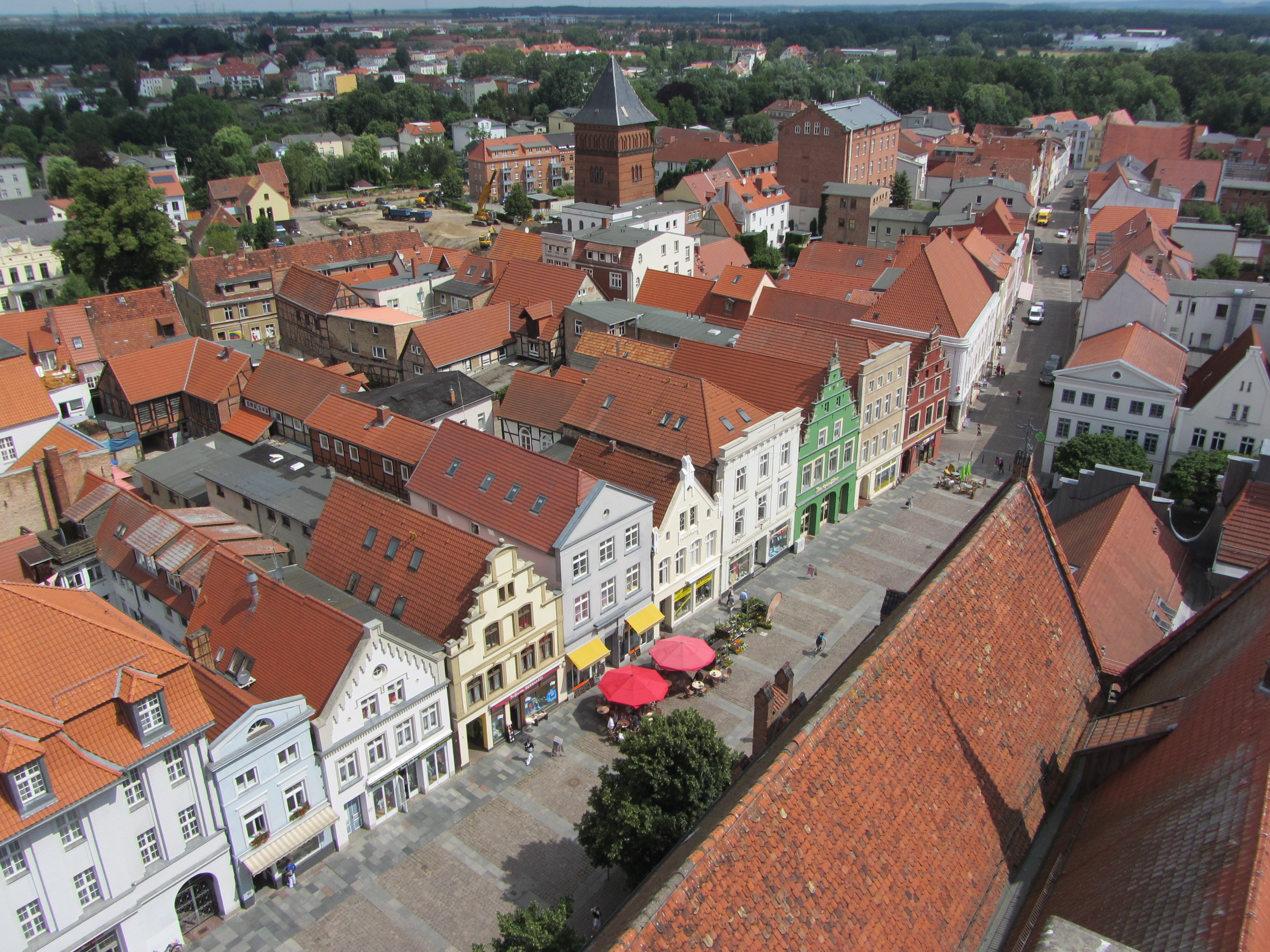
Gable houses at Güstrow's market square

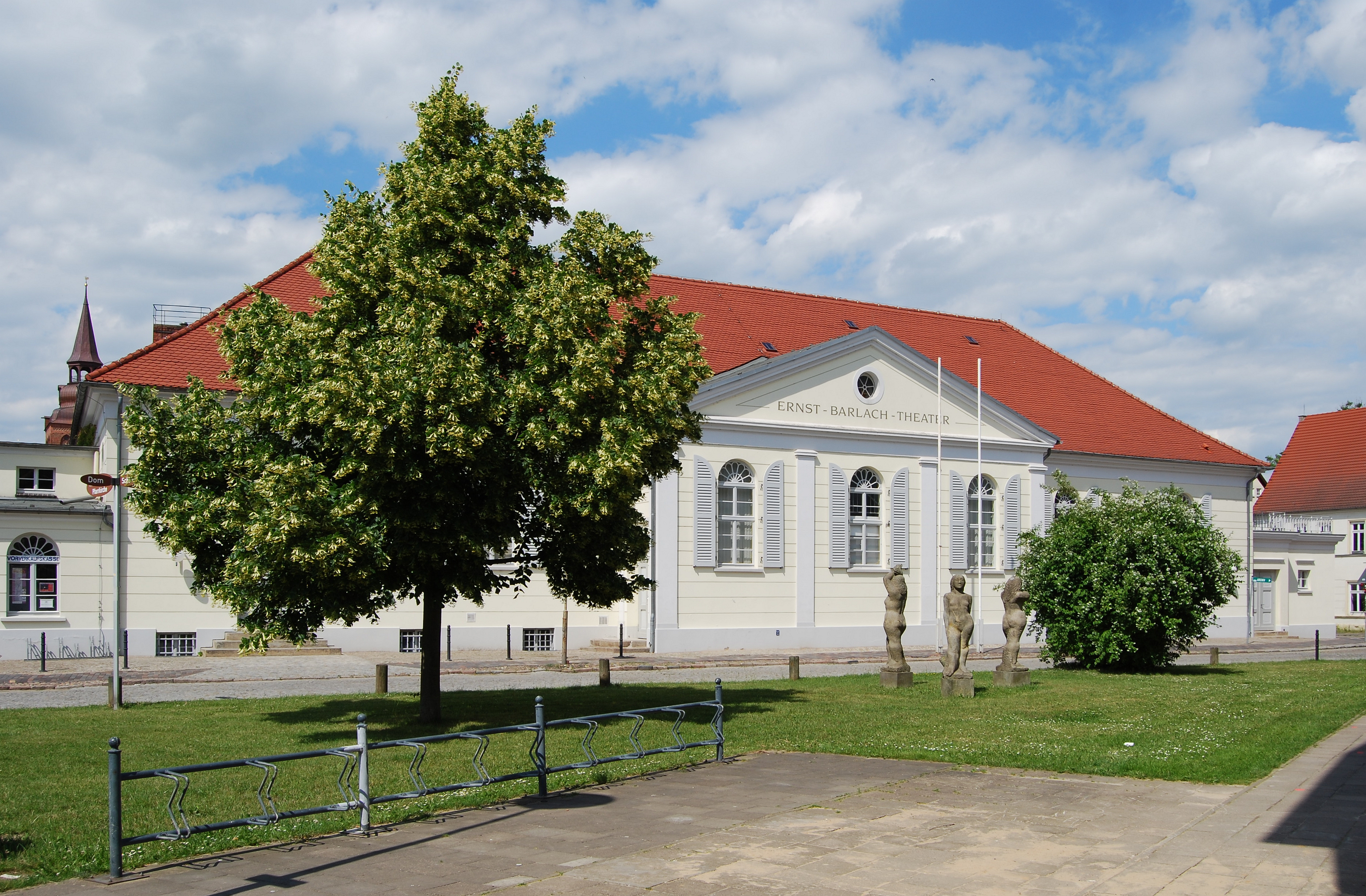
Theatre of Güstrow (Ernst-Barlach-Theater)

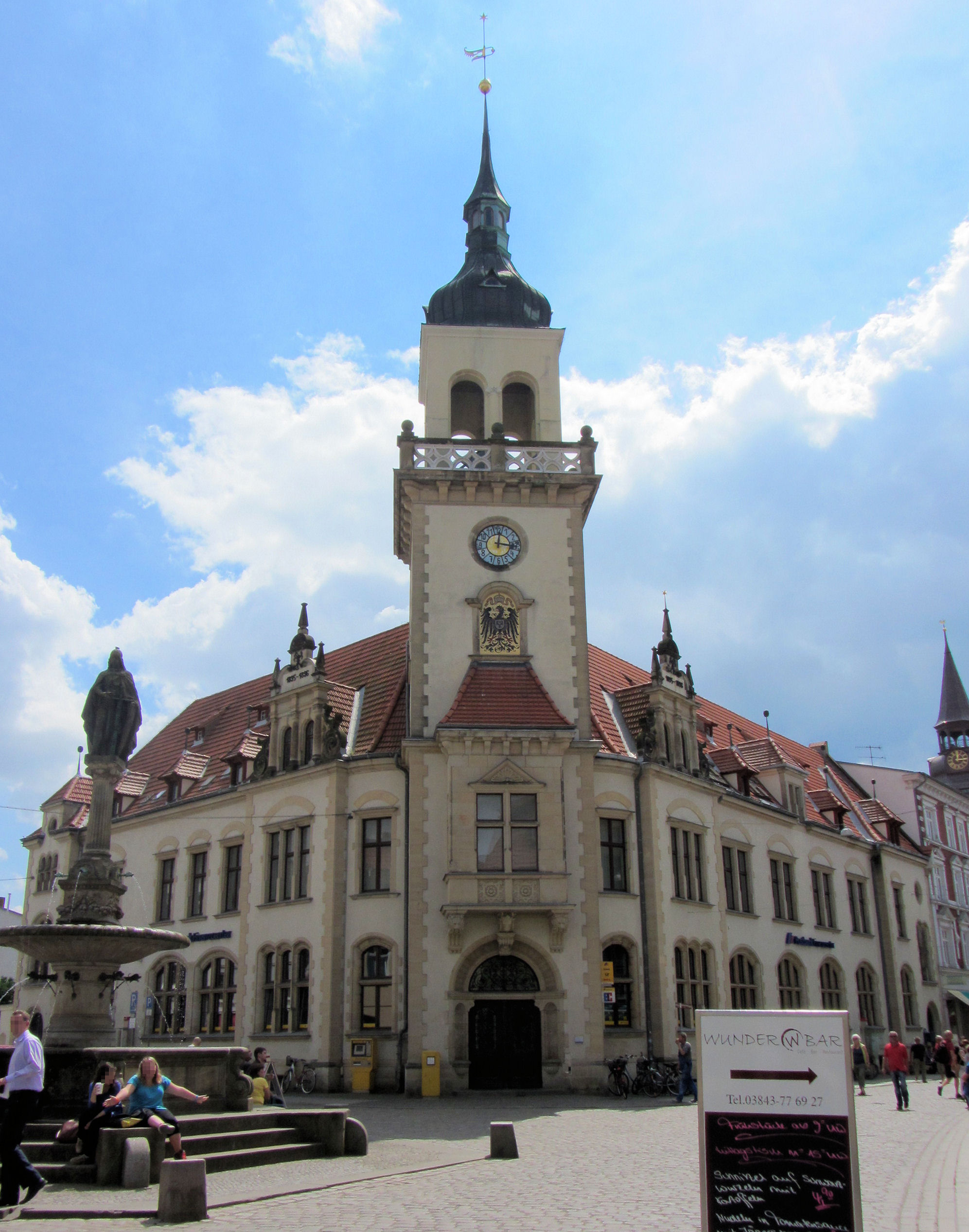
Main Post Office (historicist architecture)

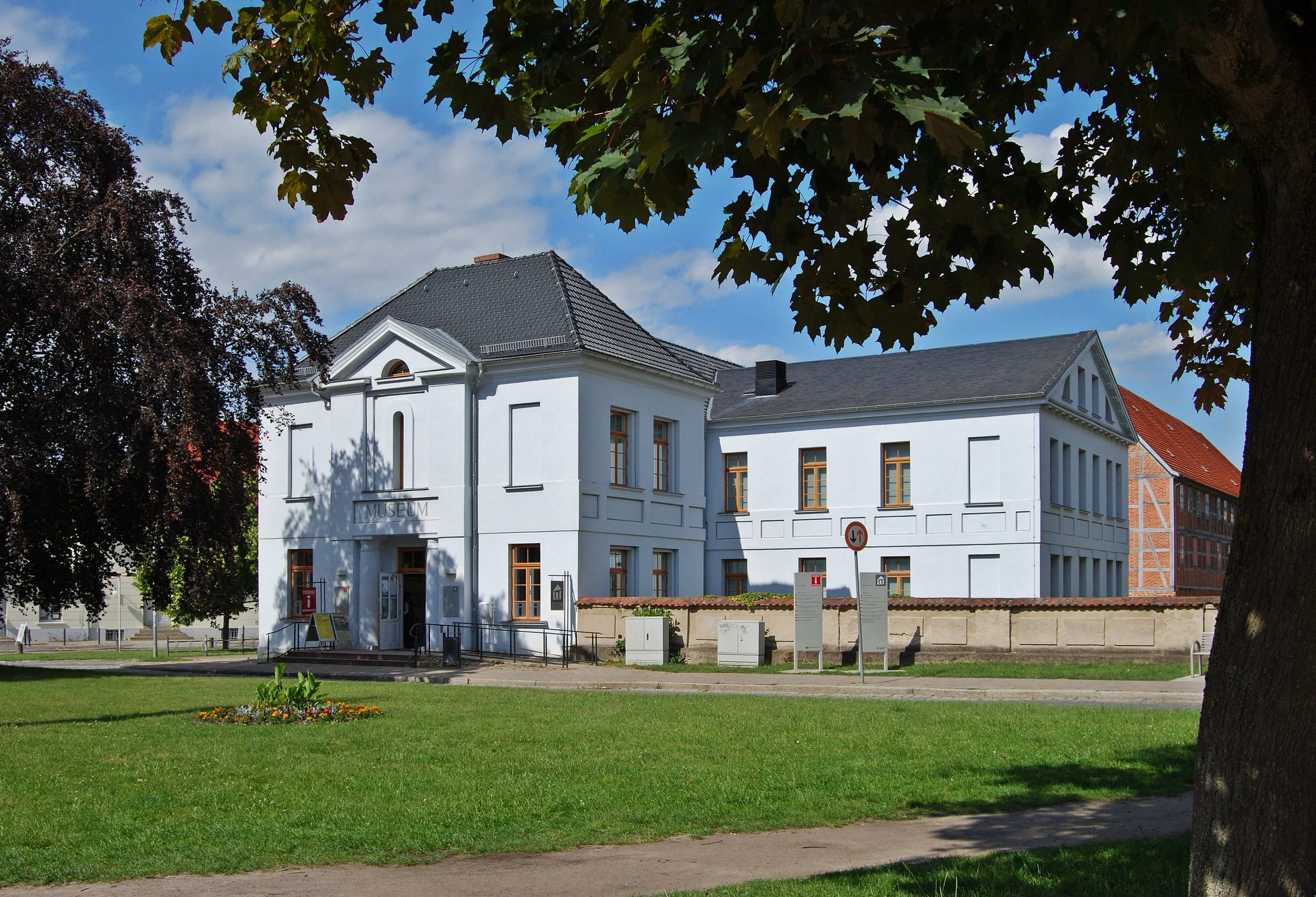
City museum and tourist info

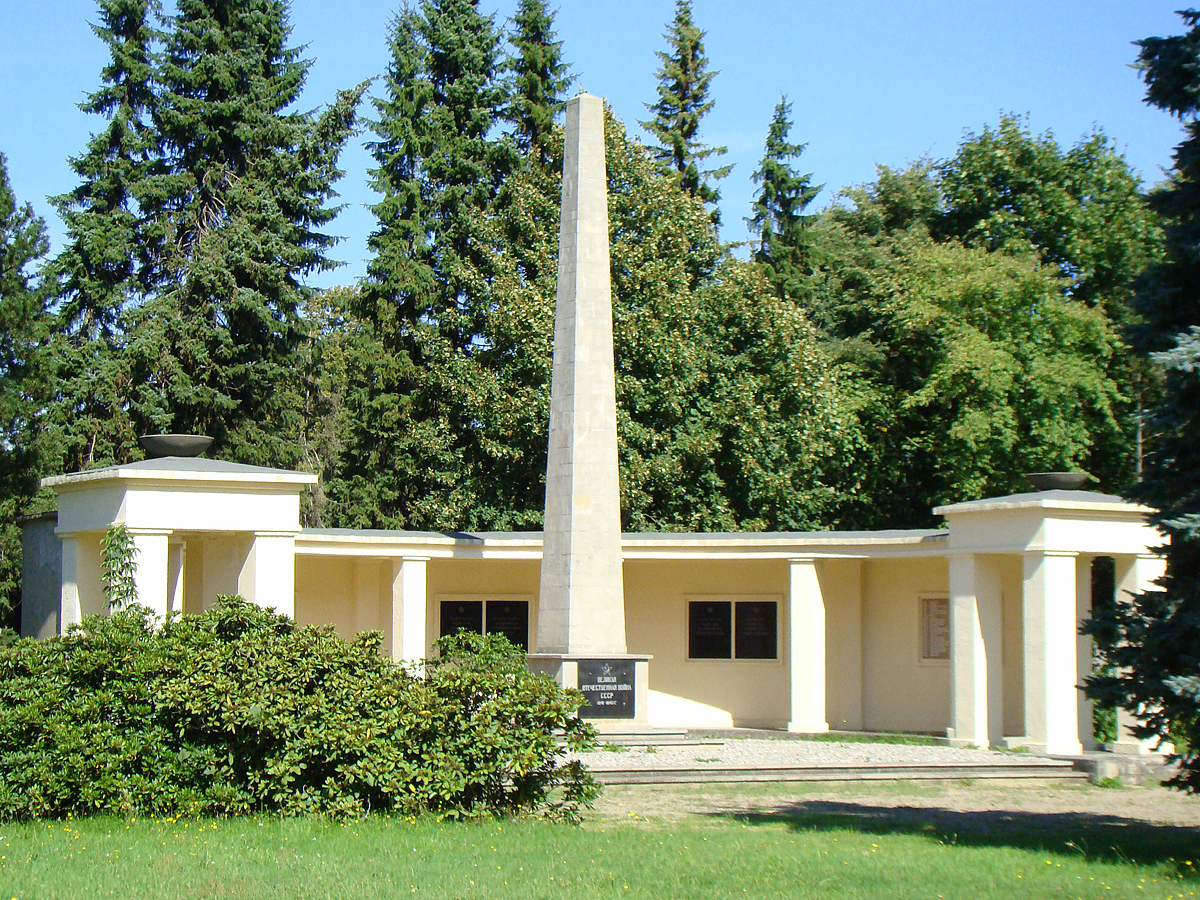
Soviet Cemetery

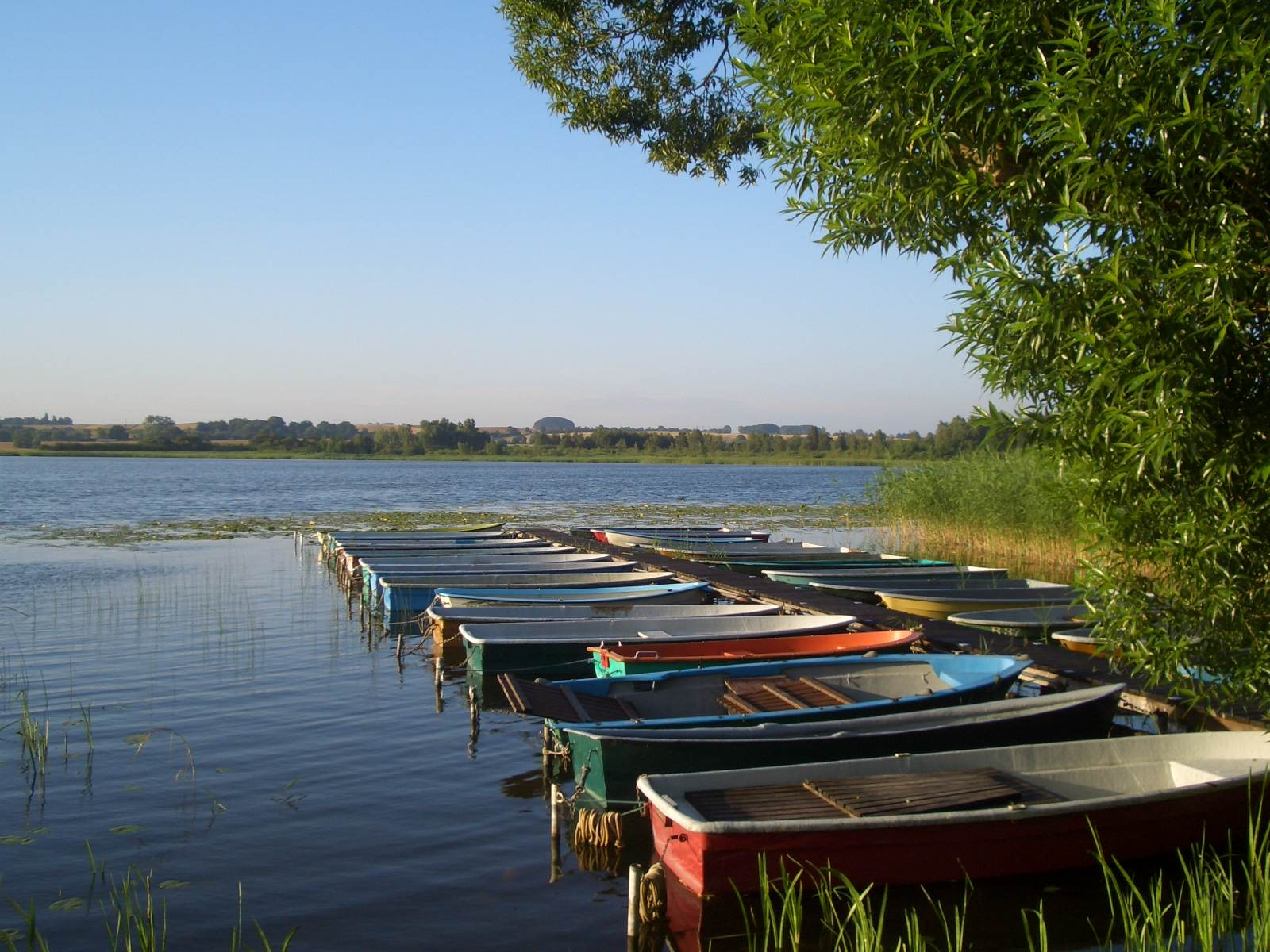
Inselsee (Island Lake)

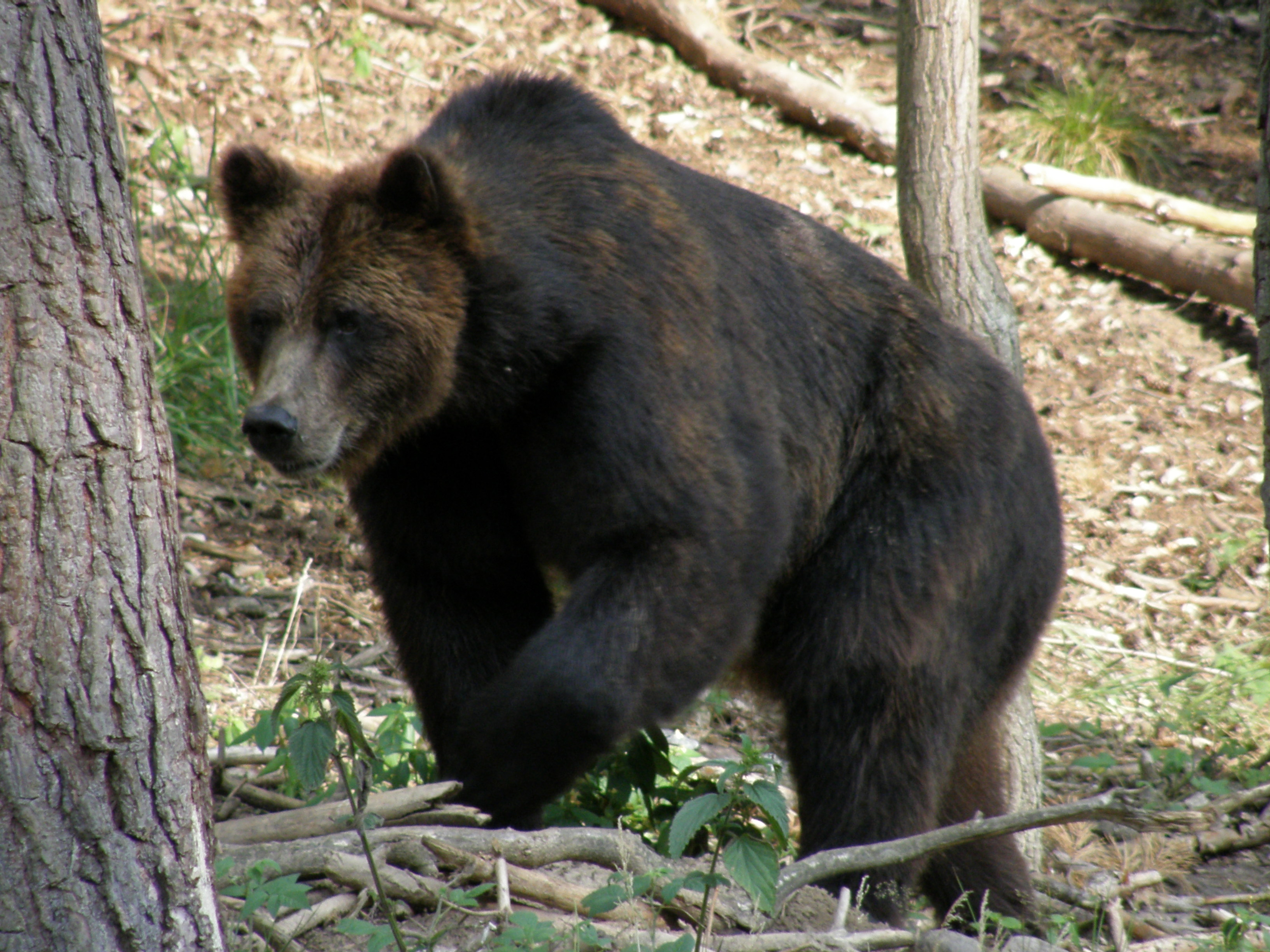
Nature and Environment Park (Natur- und Umweltpark Güstrow)

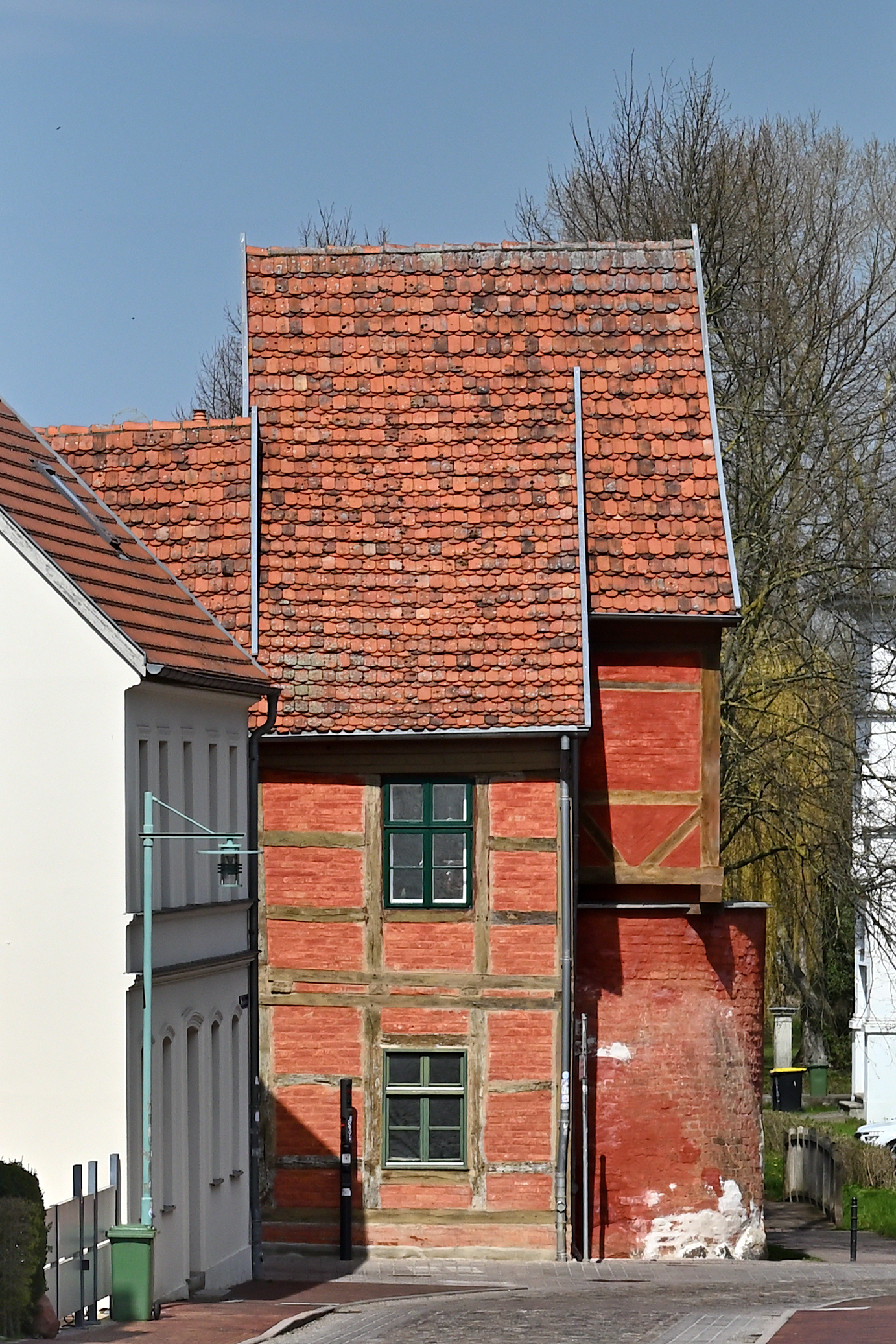
The Armesünderturm

== Education ==
- Fachhochschule für öffentliche Verwaltung, Rechtspflege und Polizei Güstrow (University of Administration, Judicature and Police in Güstrow)
- John-Brinckman-Gymnasium Güstrow (public grammar school)
- ecolea – International School Güstrow (private grammar school)
- Freie Schule Güstrow e.V.
- Secondary School "Richard Wossidlo"
- Secondary School "Thomas Müntzer"
- Primary and Secondary School "Schule am Inselsee"
- Primary School "Georg Friedrich Kersting"
- Primary School "Fritz Reuter"
- Primary School "Schule an der Nebel"

== Transport ==
City buses are operated by rebus GmbH. The town is the southern terminus of the Rostock S-Bahn.

== Sport and leisure ==
The motorcycle speedway team MC Güstrow competes in the German league at the Güstrow Speedway Stadium.

== Notable people ==
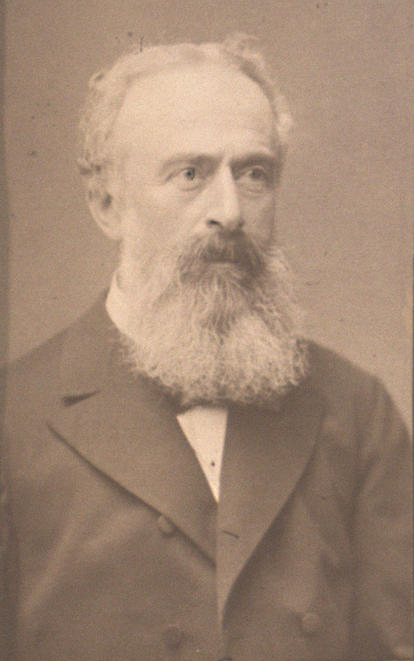
Karl Christian Johann Holsten, pre 1897

- Christian Geist (ca 1650–1711), a German composer and organist, who lived and worked in Scandinavia.
- Joachim Daniel von Jauch (1688–1754), major general and baroque architect
- John Brinckman (1814–1870), poet and short story writer of humorous works in Plattdeutsch.
- Karl Christian Johann Holsten (1825–1897), a German Protestant theologian.
- Ulrich Neckel (1898–1928), pilot in WWI and a recipient of the Pour le Mérite medal
- Harry Lehmann (1924–1998), Max Planck Medal award-winning physicist
- Ernst-Ludwig Petrowsky (1933–2023), jazz saxophonist, clarinetist, flautist, composer and author; father of free jazz in the GDR
- Peter Kurth (born 1957), a German actor.
- Torsten Renz (born 1964), German politician (CDU)

=== Aristocracy ===
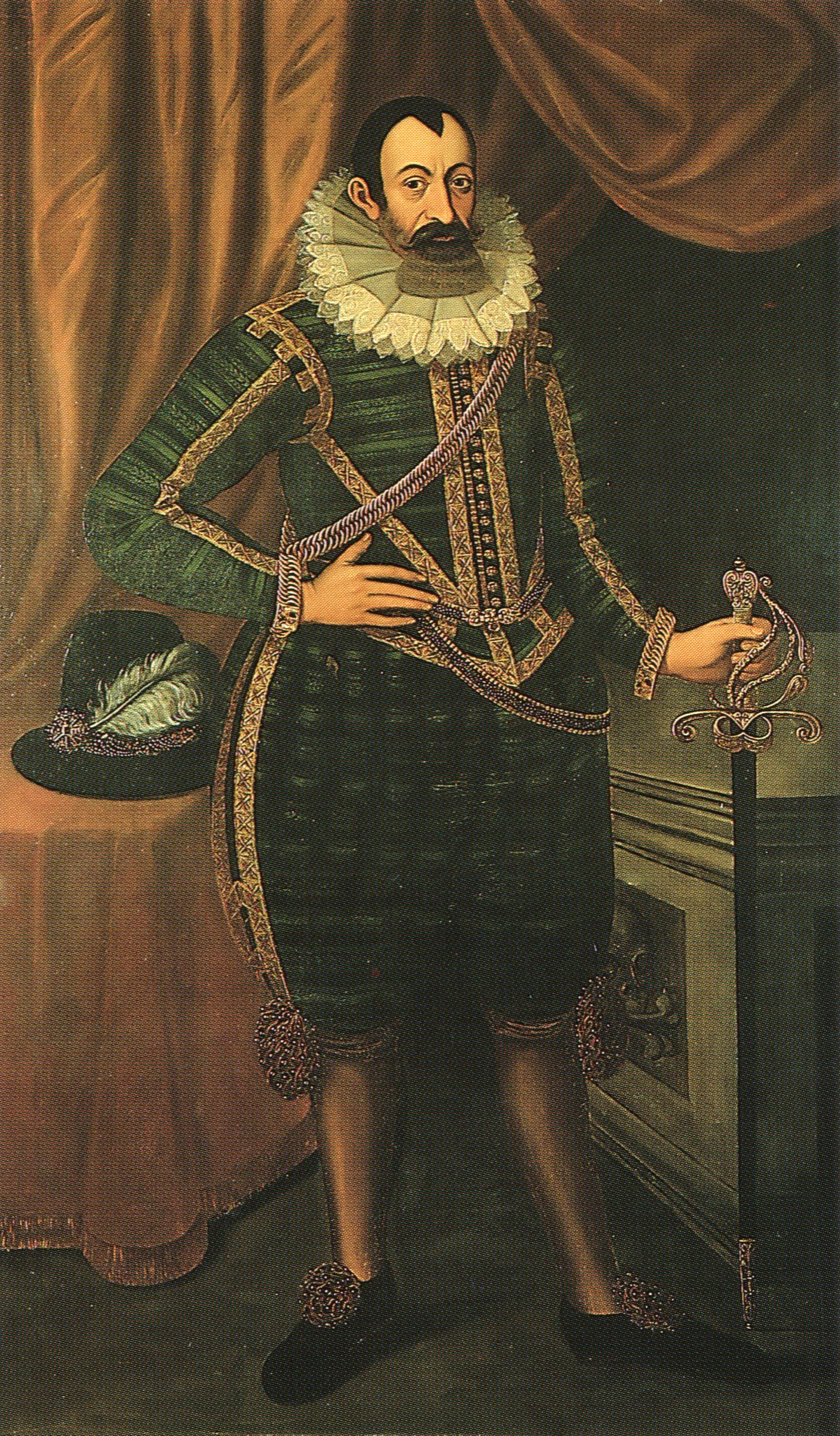
Charles I, Duke of Mecklenburg

- Albrecht VII, Duke of Mecklenburg (1486–1547), Duke of Mecklenburg in Güstrow
- John Albert I (1525–1576), duke of Mecklenburg-Güstrow from 1547 to 1556 and of Mecklenburg-Schwerin from 1556 to 1576.
- Ulrich, Duke of Mecklenburg (1527–1603), Duke of Mecklenburg (-Güstrow) from 1555-56 to 1603.
- Charles I, Duke of Mecklenburg (1540–1610 in Güstrow) Duke of Mecklenburg
- Johann VII, Duke of Mecklenburg (1558–1592), Duke of Mecklenburg-Schwerin
- John Albert II (1590–1636 in Güstrow), was Duke of Mecklenburg from 1608 to 1611,
- Gustav Adolph, Duke of Mecklenburg-Güstrow (1633–1695), last ruler of Mecklenburg-Güstrow from 1636 to 1695.
- Karl, Hereditary Prince of Mecklenburg-Güstrow (1664–1688), hereditary prince of Mecklenburg-Güstrow.

=== Sport ===
- Torsten Voss (born 1963), decathlete, silver medallist at the 1988 Summer Olympics
- Frank-Peter Roetsch (born 1964), biathlete, twice gold medallist at the 1988 Winter Olympics
- Patrick Kühl (born 1968), medley swimmer, silver medallist at the 1988 Summer Olympics

== Twin towns – sister cities ==
Güstrow is twinned with:

- Ribe, Denmark
- Gryfice, Poland
- Kronshagen, Germany
- Neuwied, Germany

== Climate ==
Climate data for Goldberg (Note: Goldberg is located approximately 23 kilometres (14.3 mi) south of Güstrow.) (1991–2020 normals)
Month	Jan	Feb	Mar	Apr	May	Jun	Jul	Aug	Sep	Oct	Nov	Dec	Year
Mean daily maximum °C (°F)	3.1 (37.6)	4.7 (40.5)	8.2 (46.8)	14.2 (57.6)	18.3 (64.9)	21.7 (71.1)	23.7 (74.7)	23.6 (74.5)	19.2 (66.6)	13.6 (56.5)	7.8 (46.0)	4.2 (39.6)	13.6 (56.5)
Daily mean °C (°F)	0.9 (33.6)	1.5 (34.7)	4.2 (39.6)	9.0 (48.2)	13.1 (55.6)	16.4 (61.5)	18.3 (64.9)	18.2 (64.8)	14.4 (57.9)	9.8 (49.6)	5.4 (41.7)	2.4 (36.3)	9.6 (49.3)
Mean daily minimum °C (°F)	−1.7 (28.9)	−0.9 (30.4)	0.4 (32.7)	3.8 (38.8)	7.6 (45.7)	10.9 (51.6)	13.2 (55.8)	13.2 (55.8)	10.1 (50.2)	6.5 (43.7)	2.9 (37.2)	0.0 (32.0)	5.6 (42.1)
Average precipitation mm (inches)	53.9 (2.12)	40.7 (1.60)	39.2 (1.54)	28.6 (1.13)	46.4 (1.83)	61.6 (2.43)	75.9 (2.99)	58.0 (2.28)	50.2 (1.98)	47.3 (1.86)	47.7 (1.88)	48.1 (1.89)	593.2 (23.35)
Average precipitation days (≥ 1.0 mm)	18.9	14.9	13.9	10.4	13.1	13.4	15.2	15.4	13.1	14.5	16.1	18.6	174.2
Average relative humidity (%)	89.5	85.5	80.2	71.1	73.2	74.3	74.8	76.5	80.3	86.0	90.4	90.2	81.0
Mean monthly sunshine hours	42.0	73.3	127.3	205.4	236.4	233.5	233.1	204.1	164.7	110.6	52.1	37.7	1,769.9
Source: World Meteorological Organization
