= Sumpfsee =

Lake in Germany

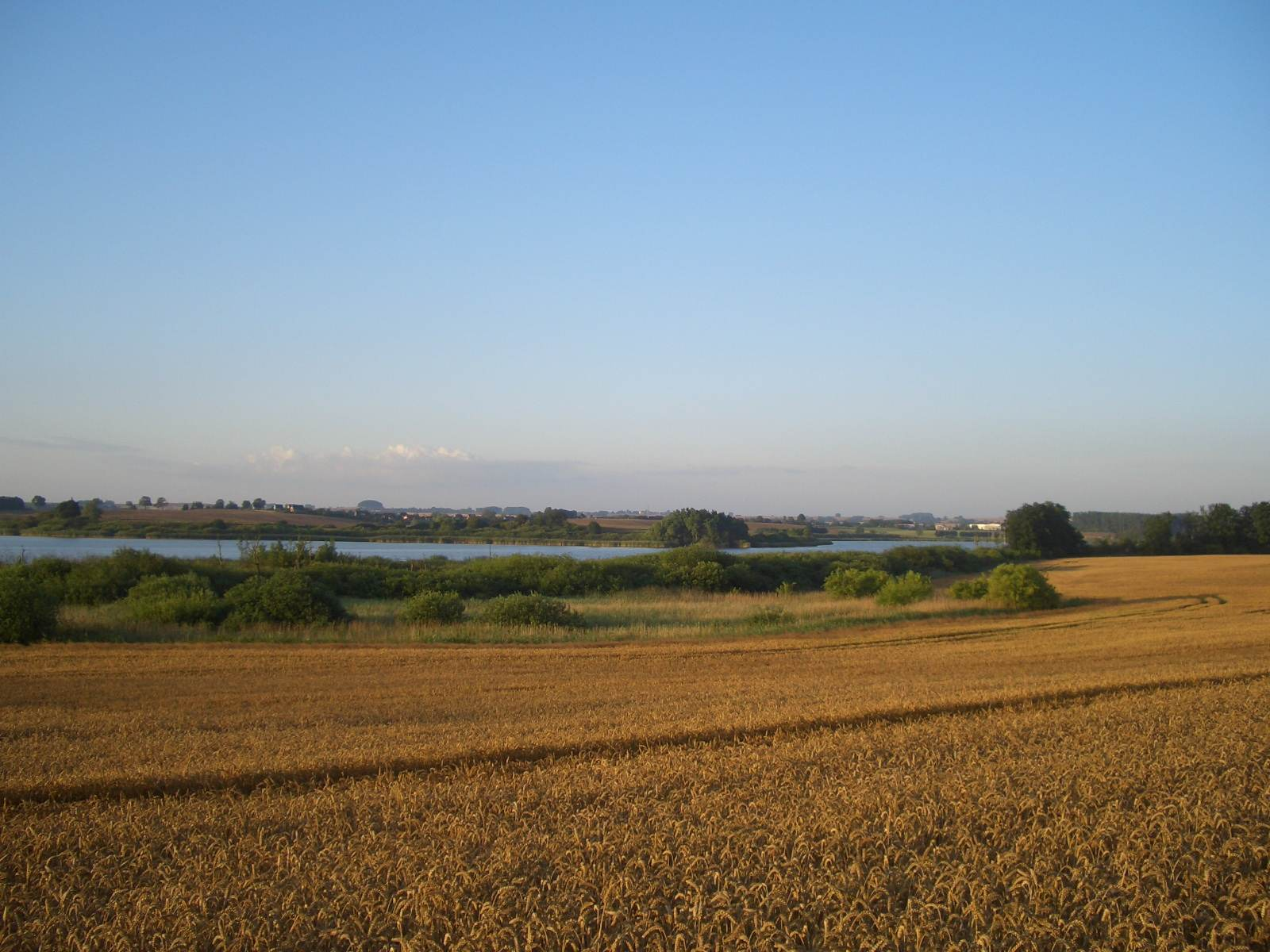

- Location within Mecklenburg-Vorpommern
- Location: Rostock, Mecklenburg-Vorpommern
- Coordinates: 53°46′25″N 12°8′40″E
- Primary outflows: Nebel
- Basin countries: Germany
- Surface area: 1.27 km^{2} (0.49 sq mi)
- Surface elevation: 6 m (20 ft)
- Settlements: Güstrow

Sumpfsee is a lake in the Rostock district in Mecklenburg-Vorpommern, Germany. At an elevation of 6 m, its surface area is 1.27 km^{2}.
