= Karl Christian Johann Holsten =

German Protestant theologian (1825–1897)

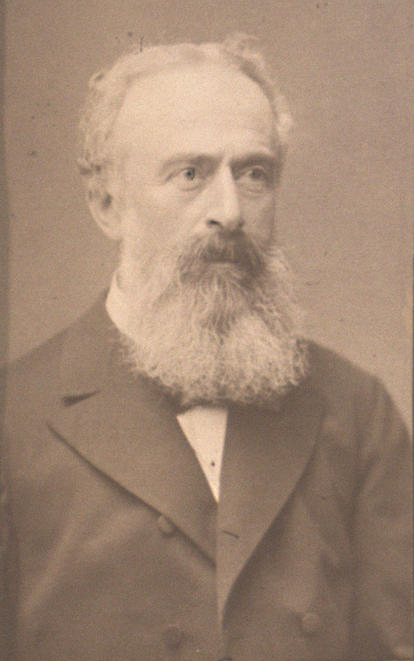
- Karl Christian Johann Holsten.
- Born: March 31, 1825; Güstrow, Mecklenburg
- Died: January 26, 1897 (aged 71); Heidelberg
- Occupation: German theologian

Karl Christian Johann Holsten (March 31, 1825 – January 26, 1897) was a German Protestant theologian.

Holsten was born in Güstrow, Mecklenburg. He studied at Leipzig, Berlin, and the Rostock, where he became a teacher of religion at the Gymnasium in 1852. In 1870, he became a professor of New Testament studies at the Bern and moved to the Heidelberg in 1876, where he remained until his death.

Holsten was a follower of the Tübingen school and supported Baur's views on the alleged antagonism between Petrinism and Paulinism. His writings include:

- Zum Evangelium d. Paulus und d. Petrus (1867)
- Das Evangelium des Paulus dargestelit (1880)
- Die synoptischen Evangelien nach der Form ihres Inhalts (1886)
