= Güstrow Dom =

- Minster/Collegiate church of St. Mary, St. John the Evangelist and St. Cecilia
- Dom St. Maria, St. Johannes Evangelista und St. Cäcilia
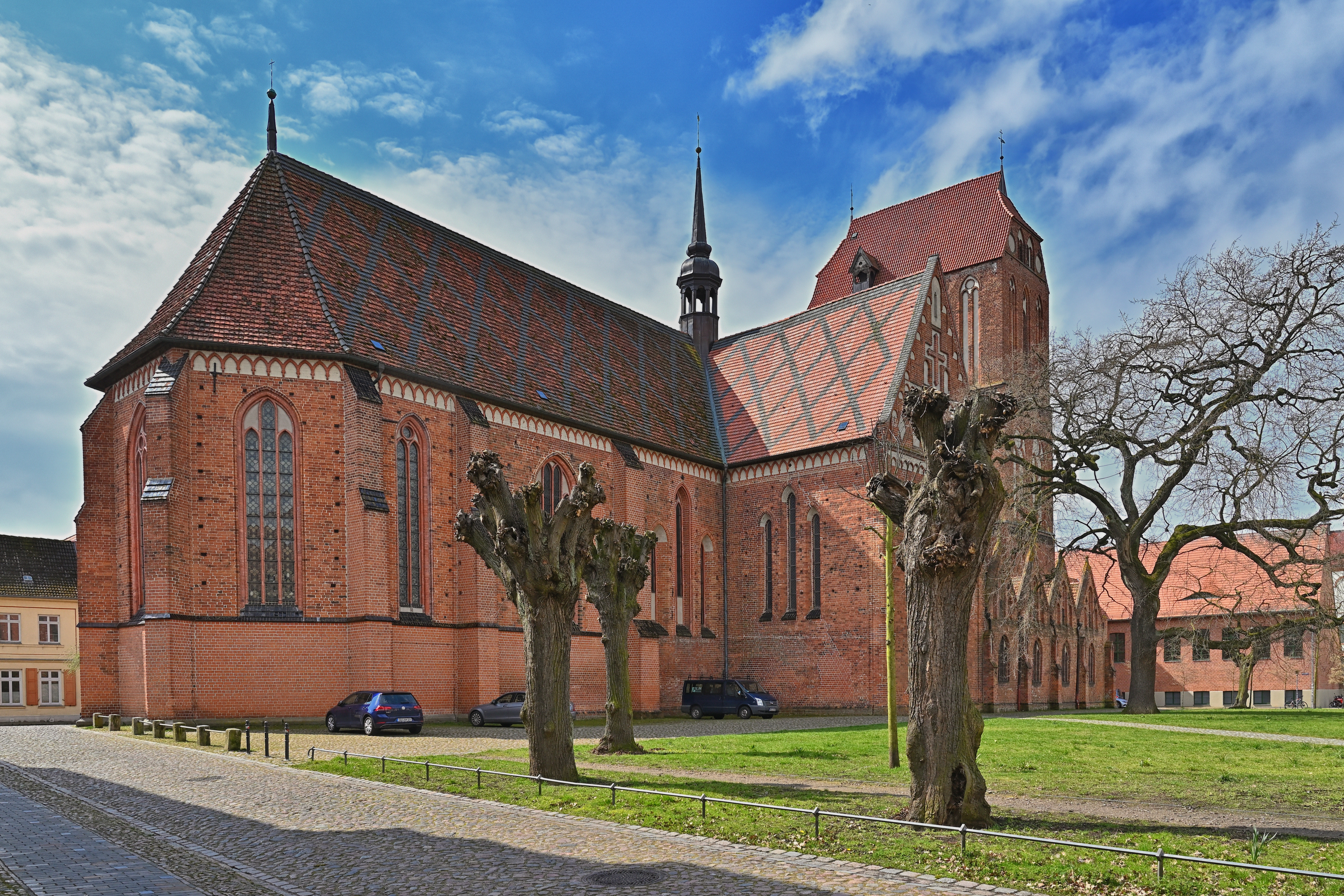
- Güstrow Dom
- 53.7910°N 12.1734°E
- Location: Güstrow
- Country: Germany
- Denomination: Evangelical Lutheran Church in Northern Germany

Architecture
- Style: Brick Gothic

The Dom ("cathedral") is a Brick Gothic Lutheran church, the largest church in the German city of Güstrow. It was built as a collegiate church and has never actually been a cathedral. Initially completed in 1335, the church is the oldest extant building in Güstrow. It houses the sculpture Der Schwebende ("The Floating One"), a war memorial created by Ernst Barlach. The apostle figures by Claus Berg, called the Güstrow Apostles, are also famous.

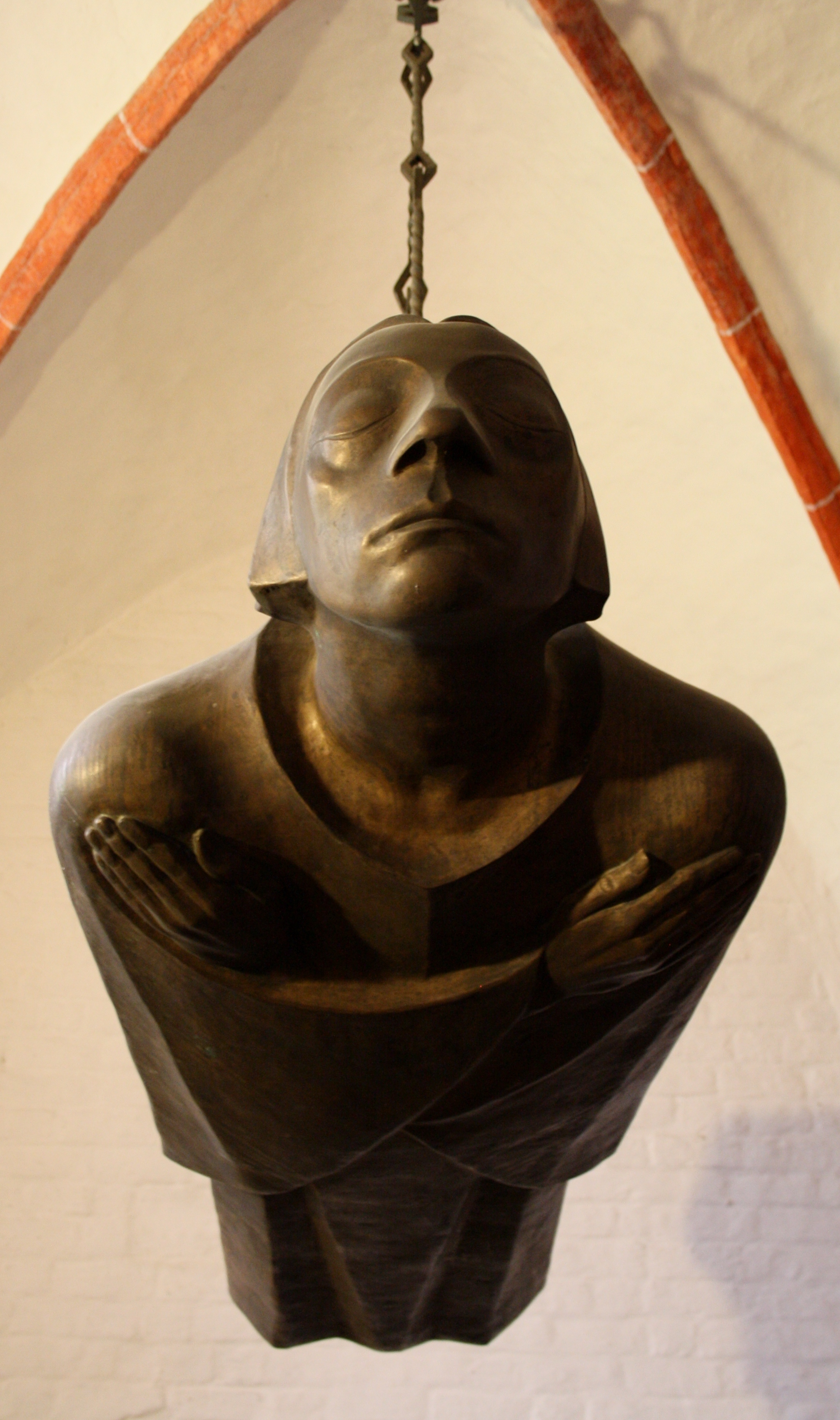
Der Schwebende by Ernst Barlach, hanging in Güstrow Cathedral

== Gallery with the Apostle figures by Claus Berg ==
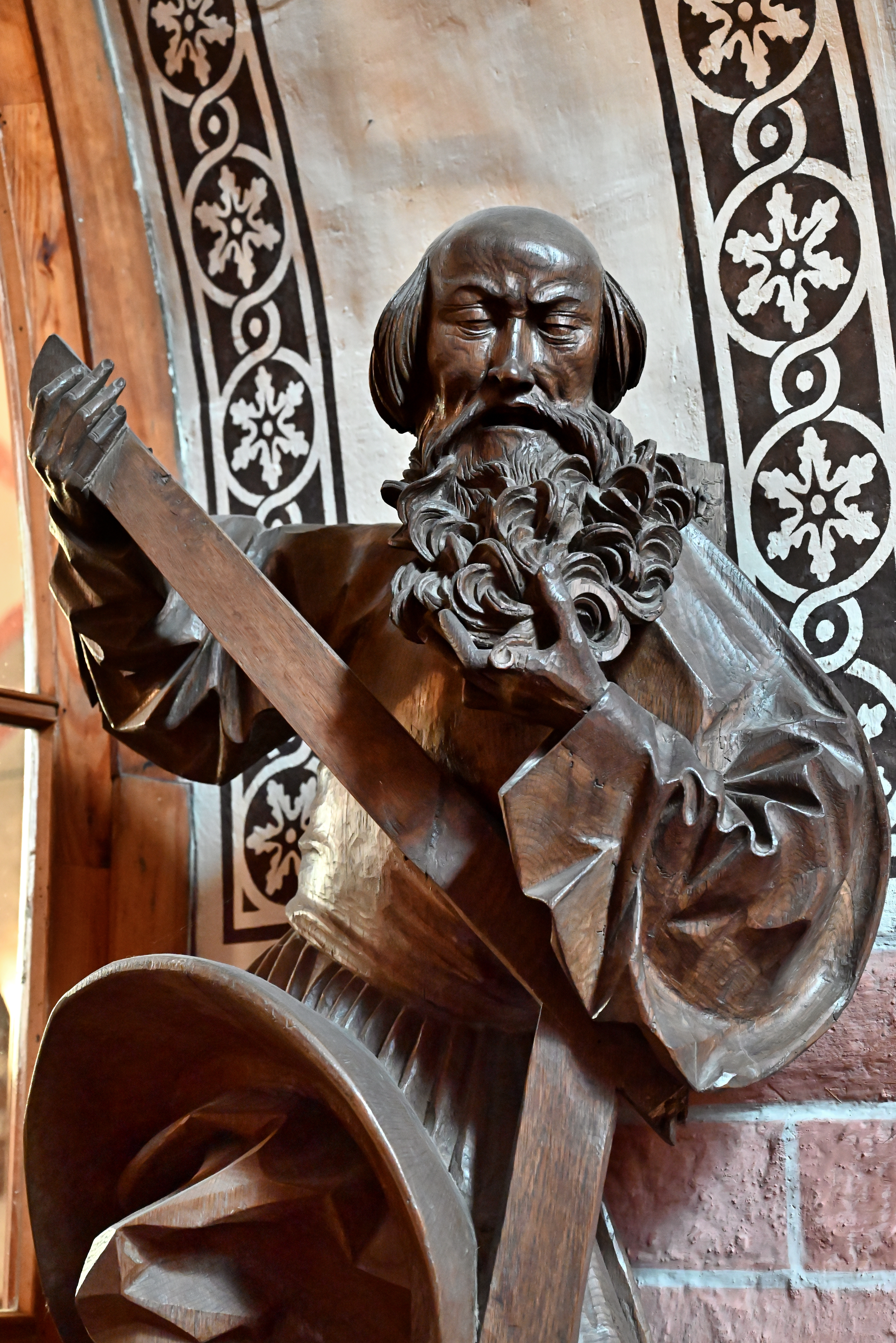
Andreas with the cross

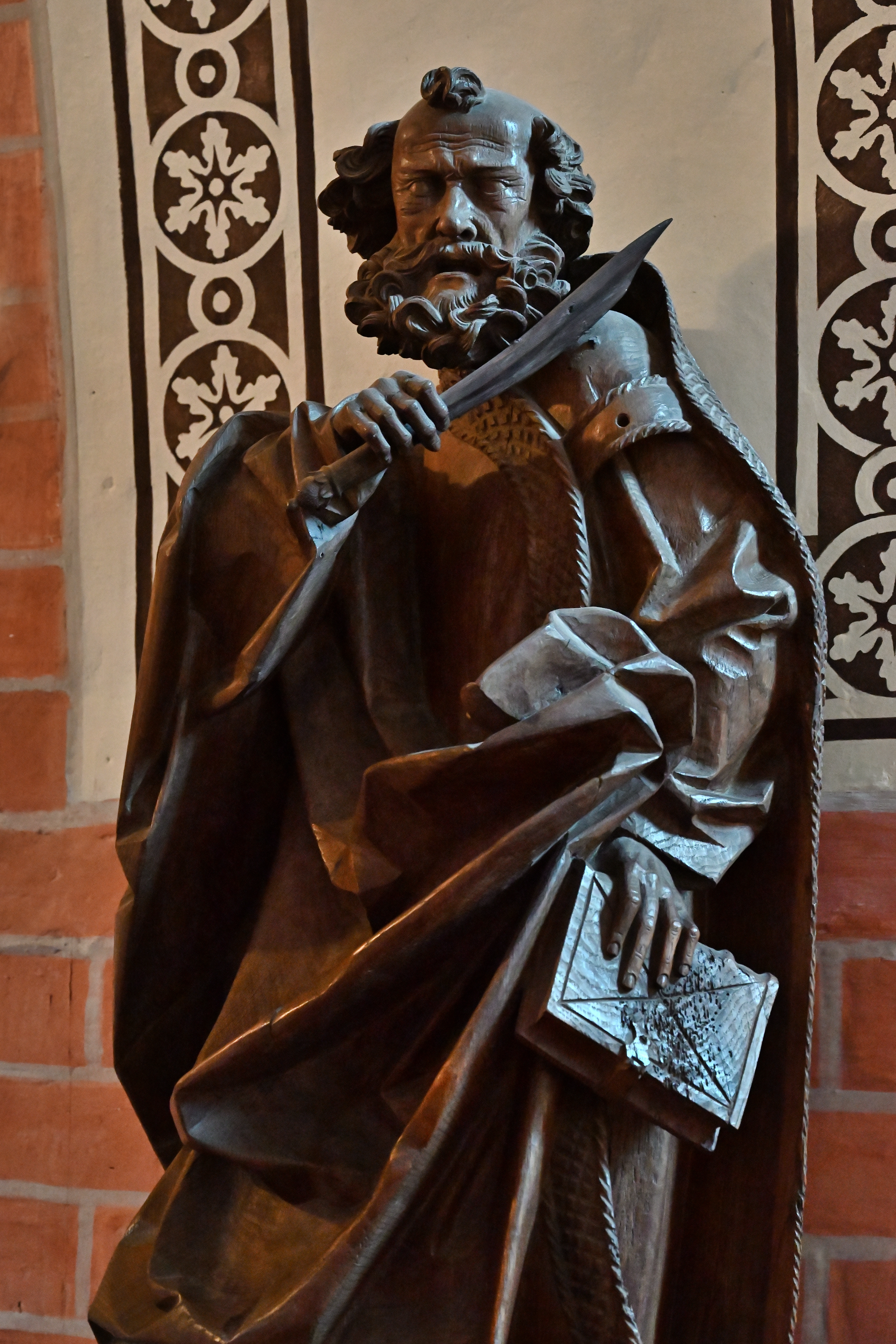
Bartholomäus with the knife

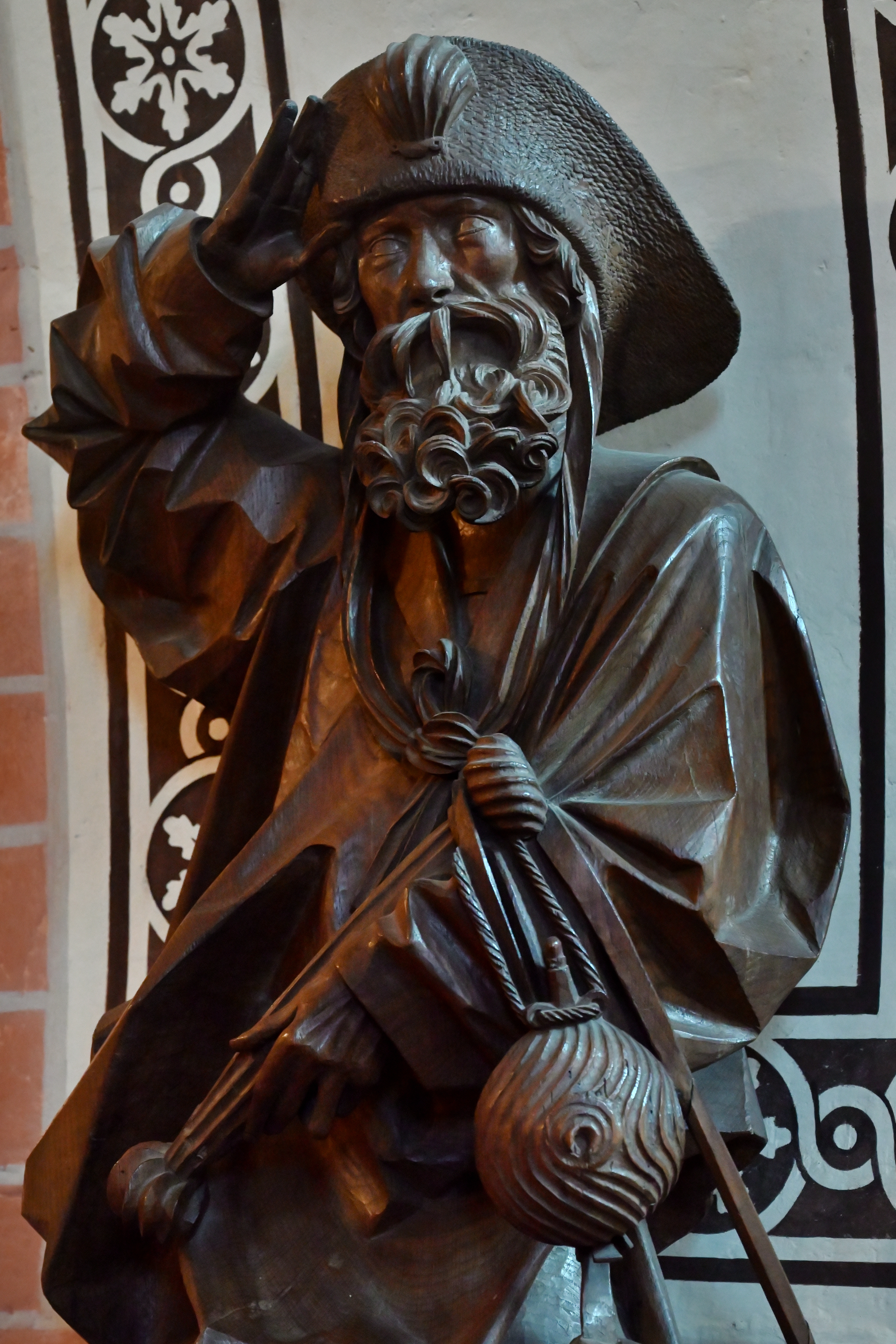
Jakobus the older one with the pilgrim's hat

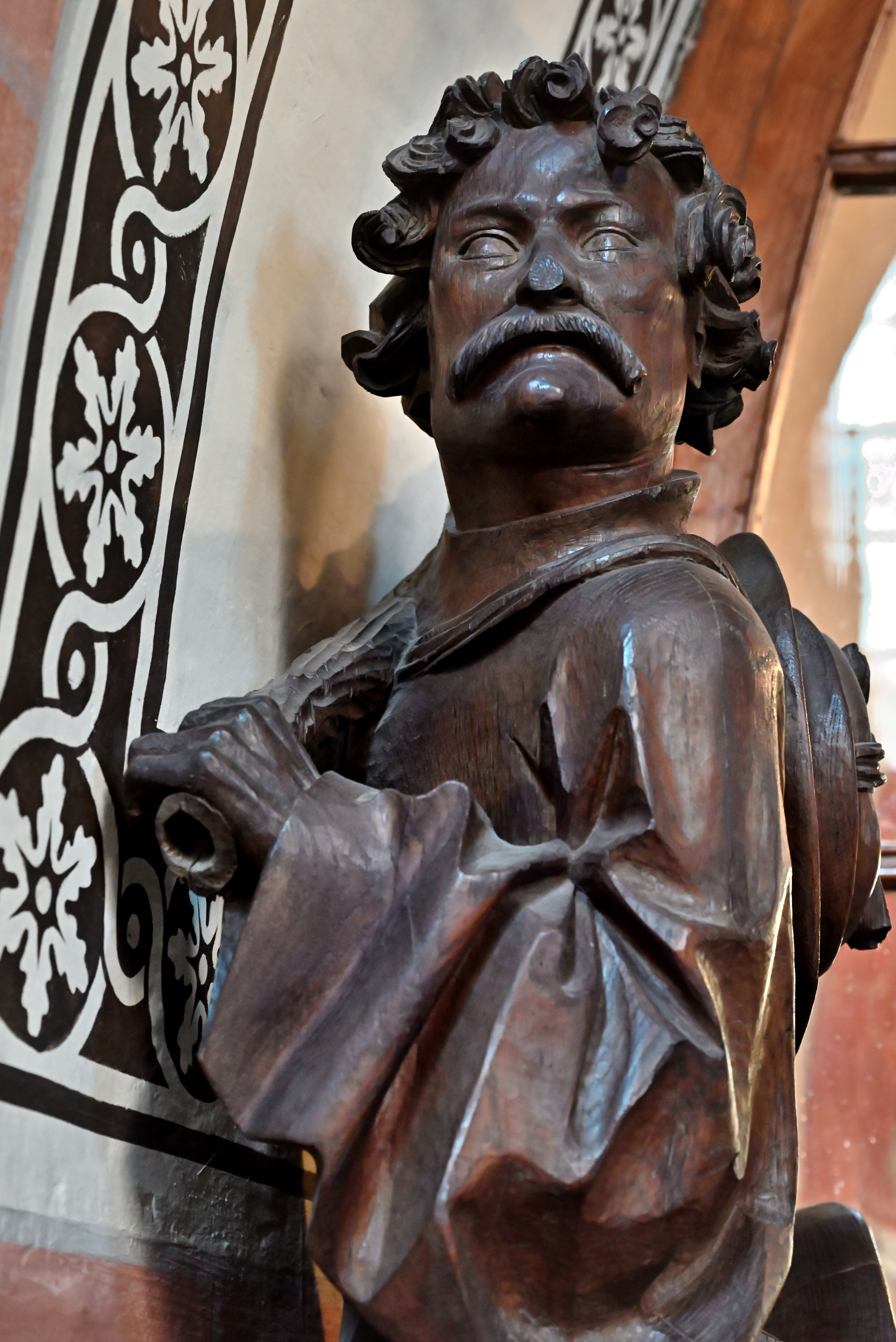
Jakobus the younger one with the walker

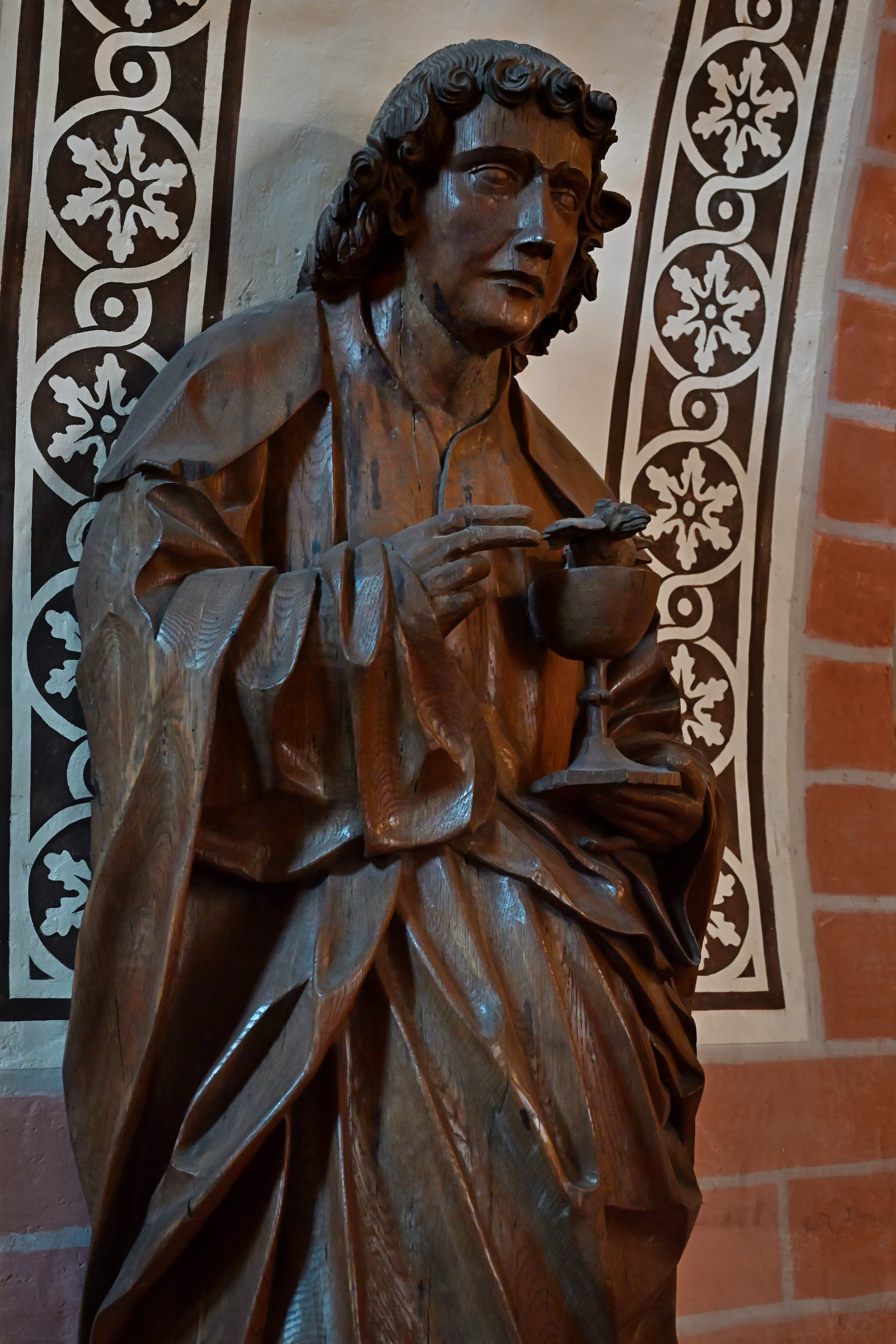
Johannes with the poison chalice

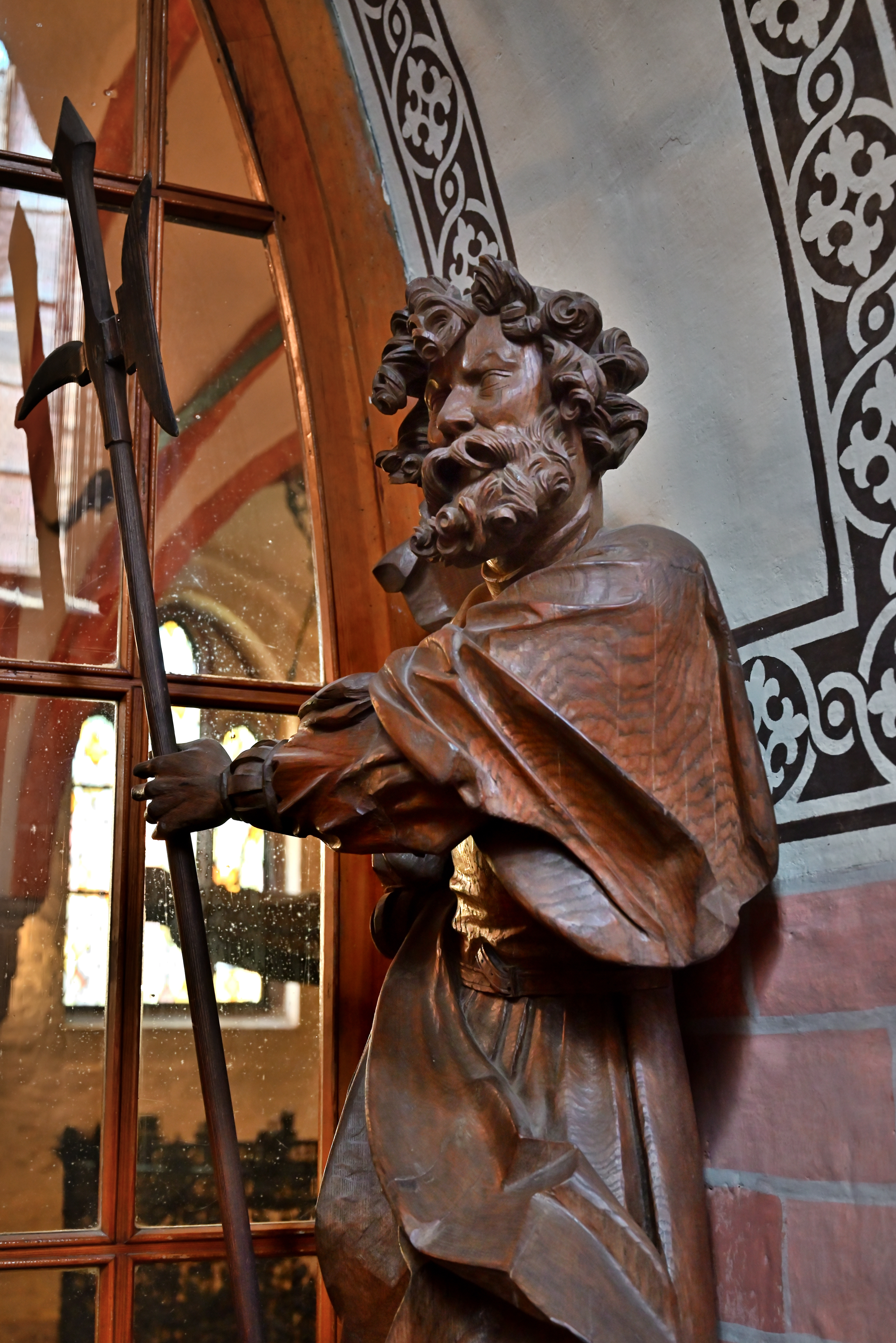
Judas Thaddäus with the halberd

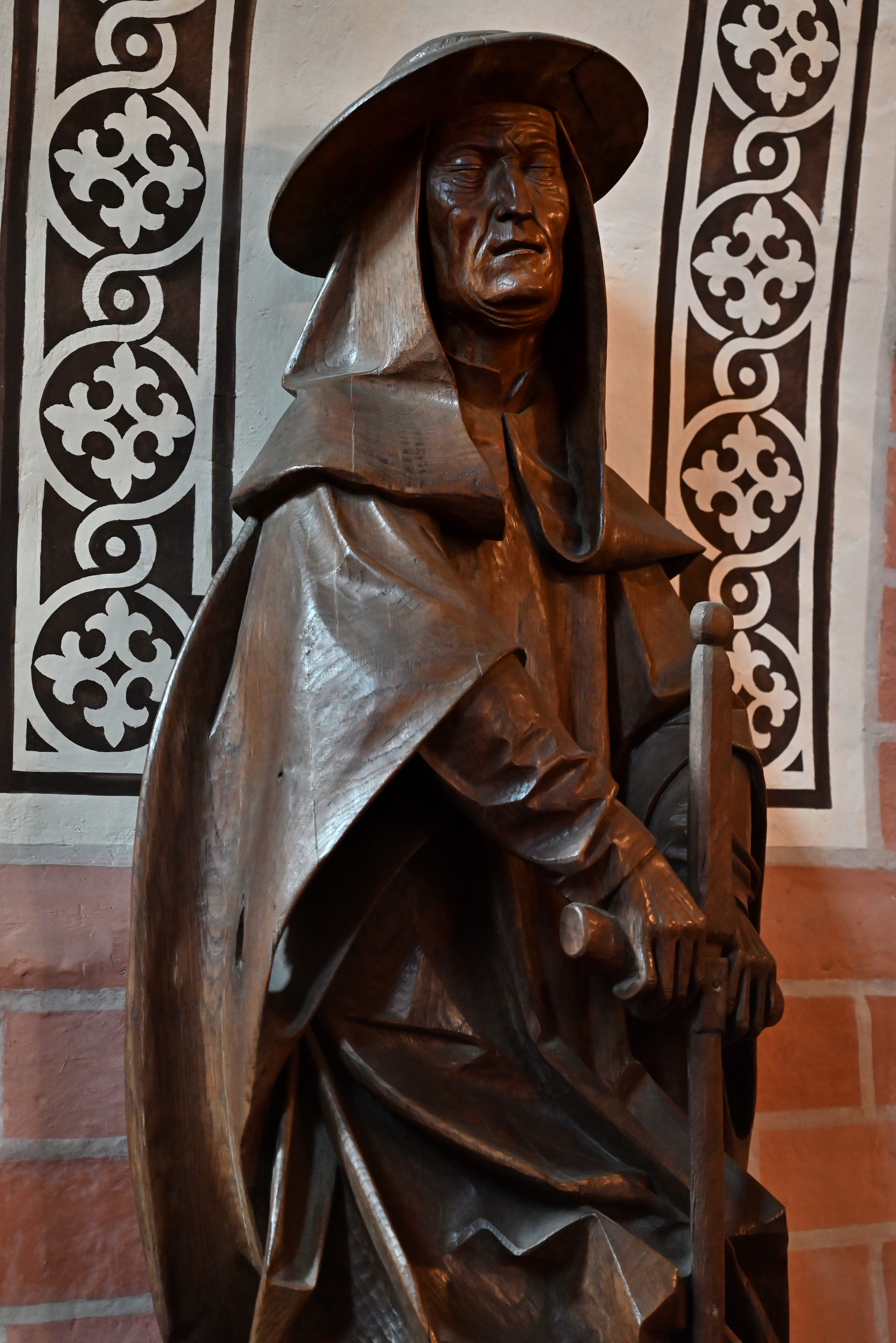
Matthäus with the dipstick

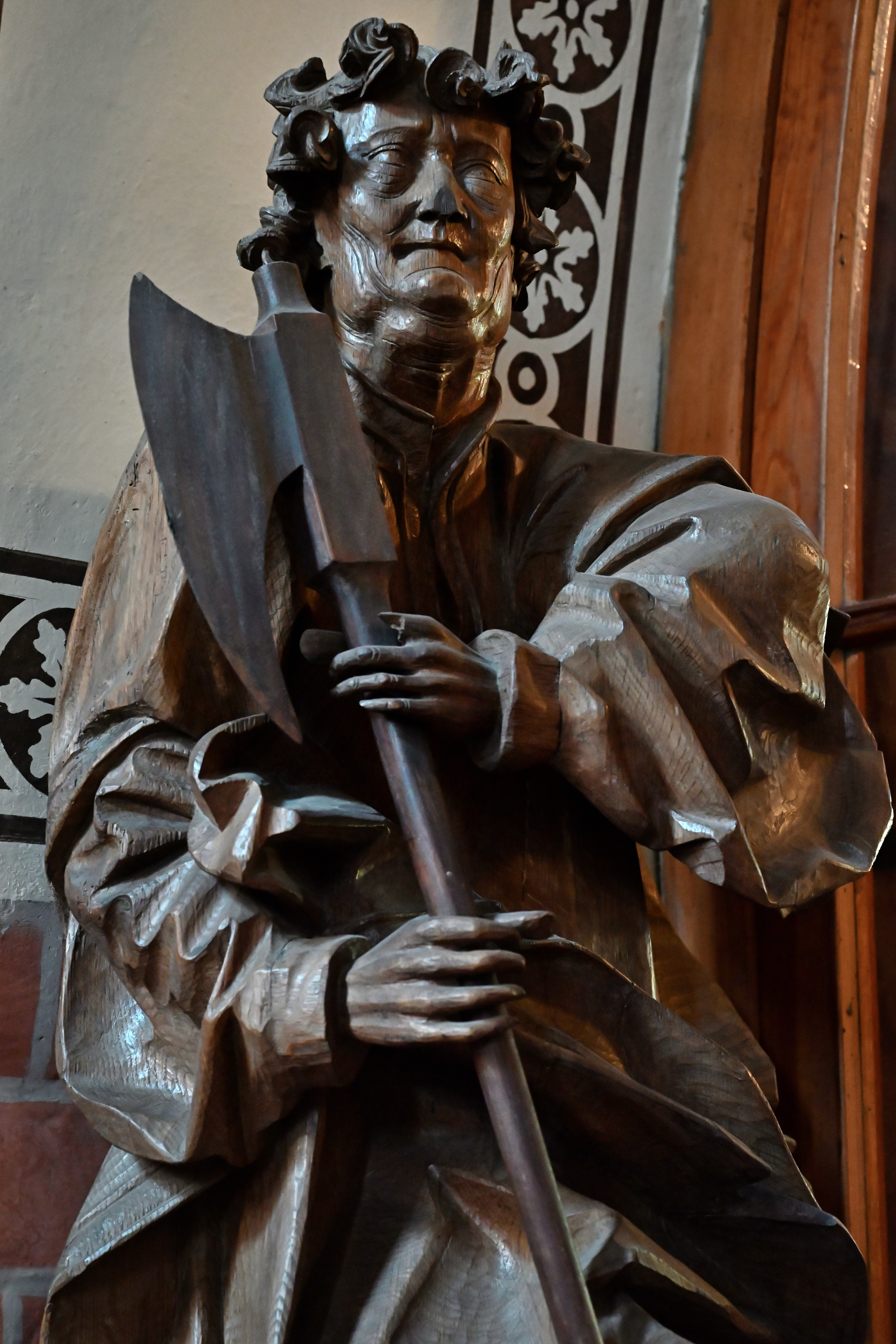
Matthias with the hatchet

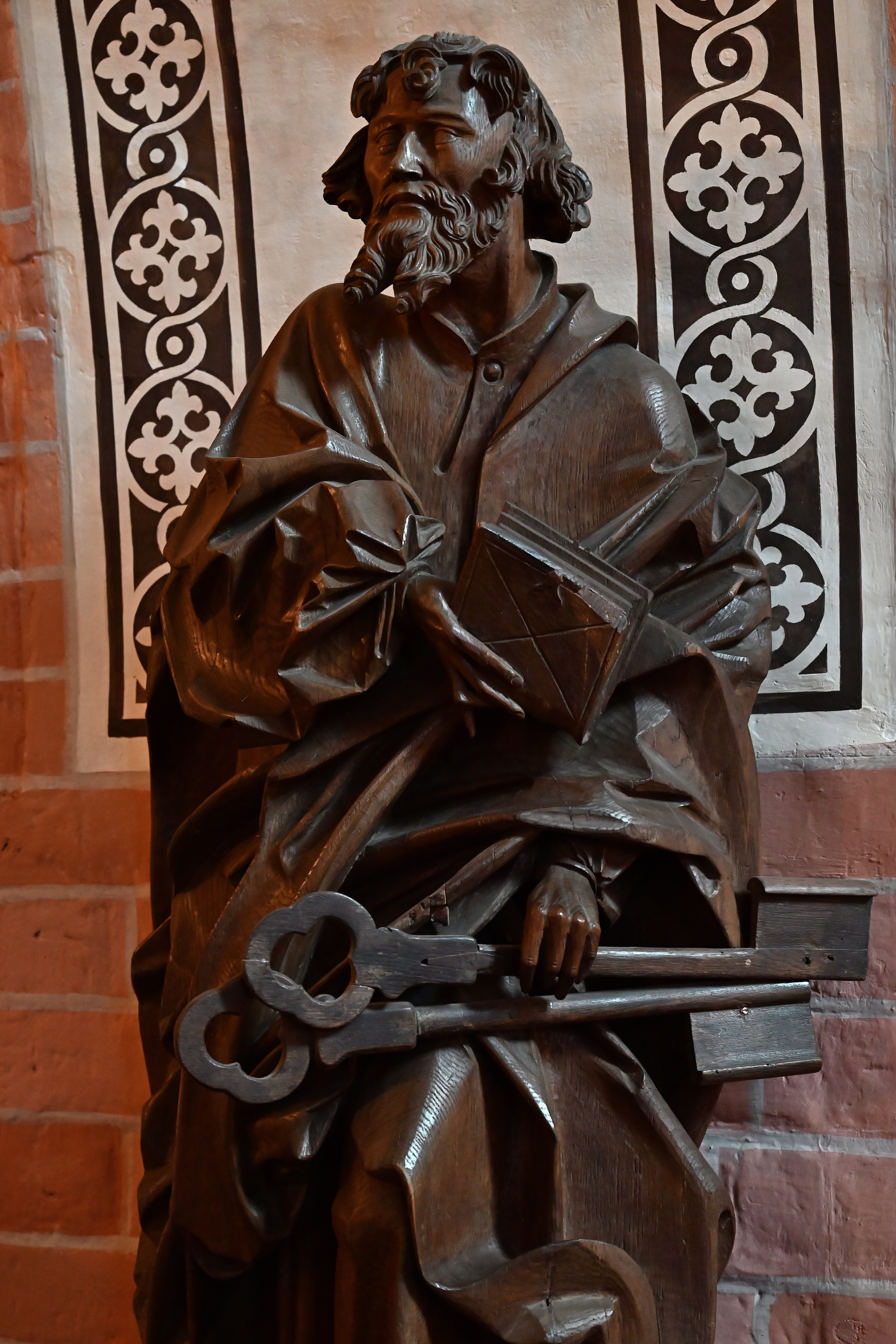
Petrus with the keys

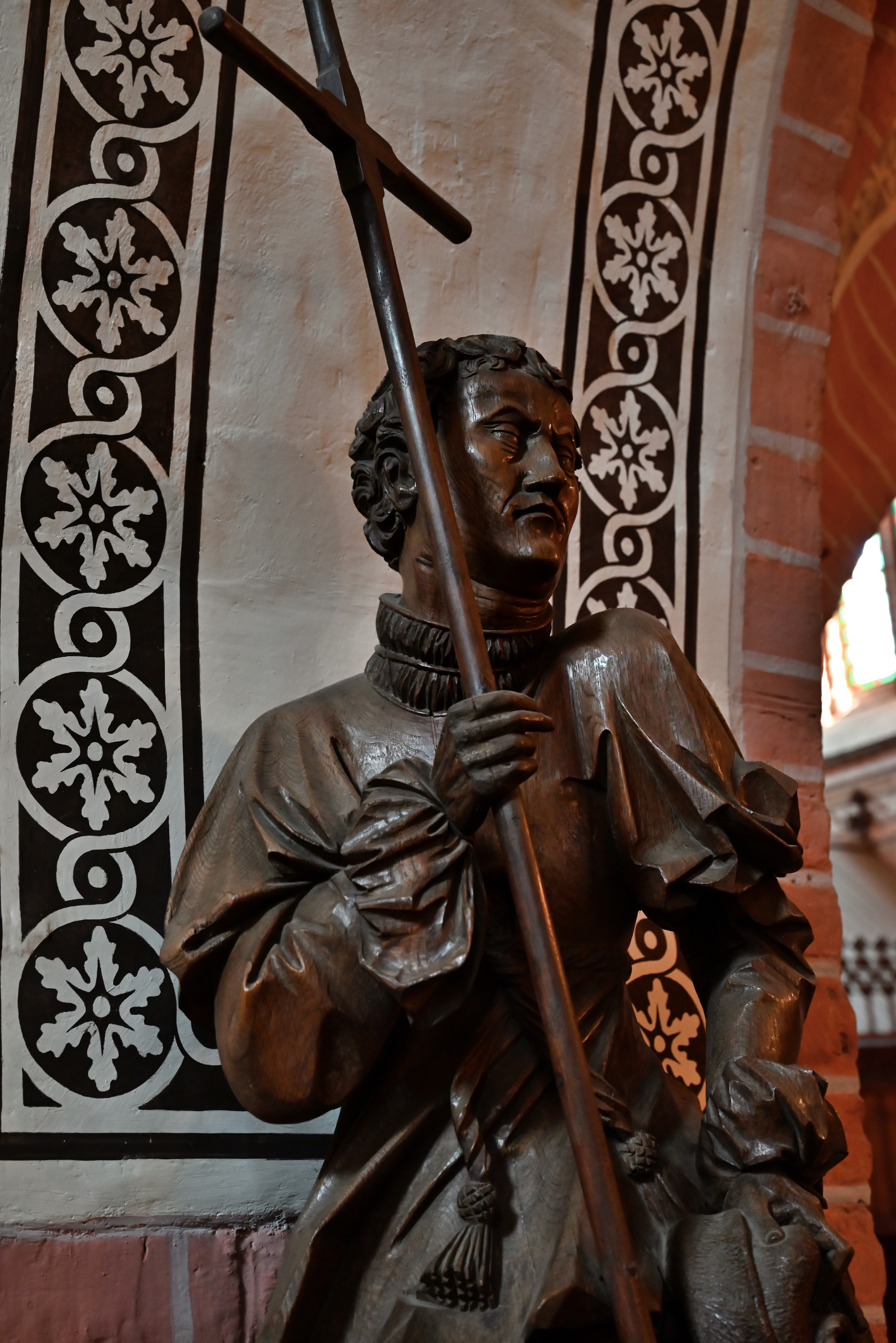
Philippus with the cross

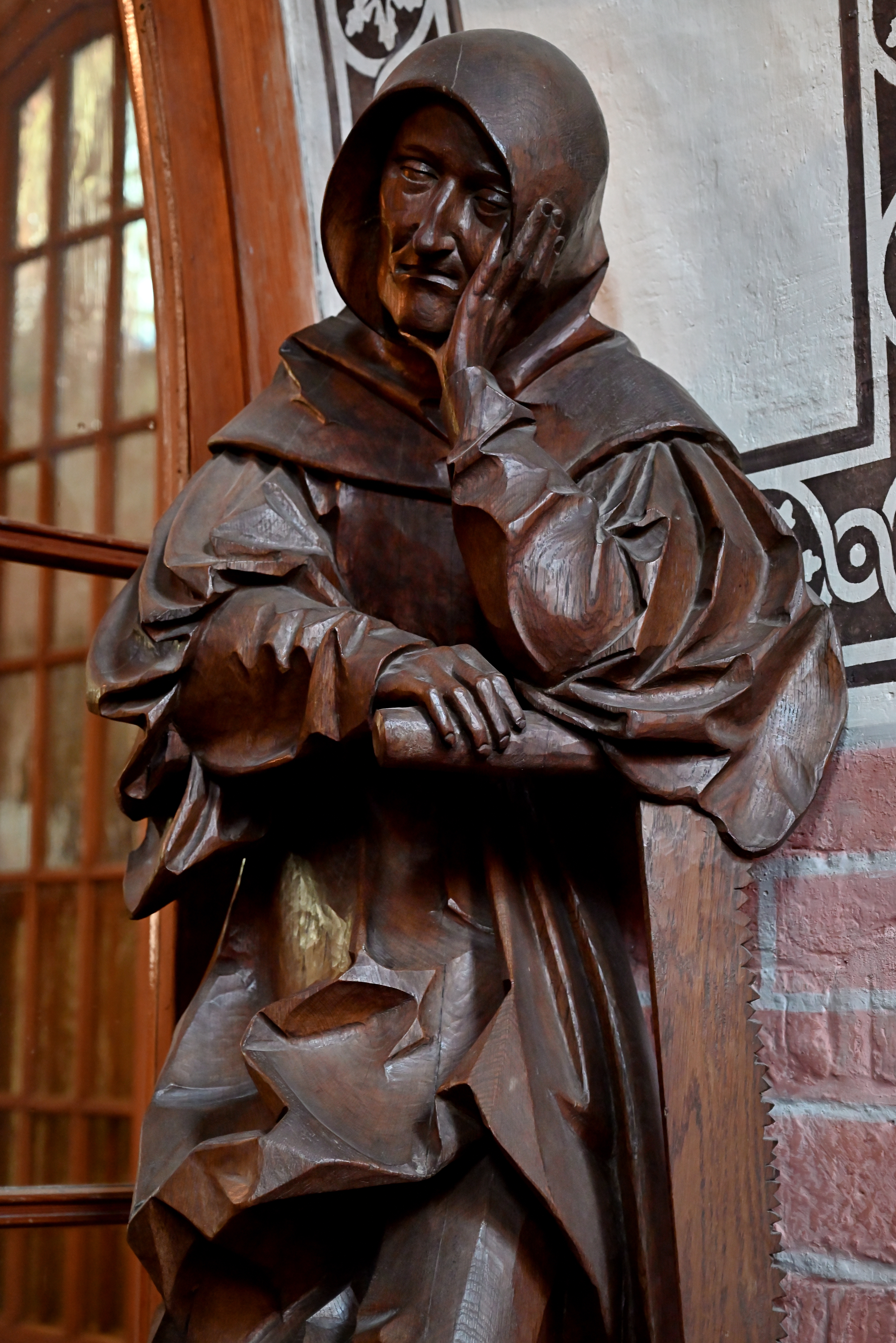
Simon with the saw

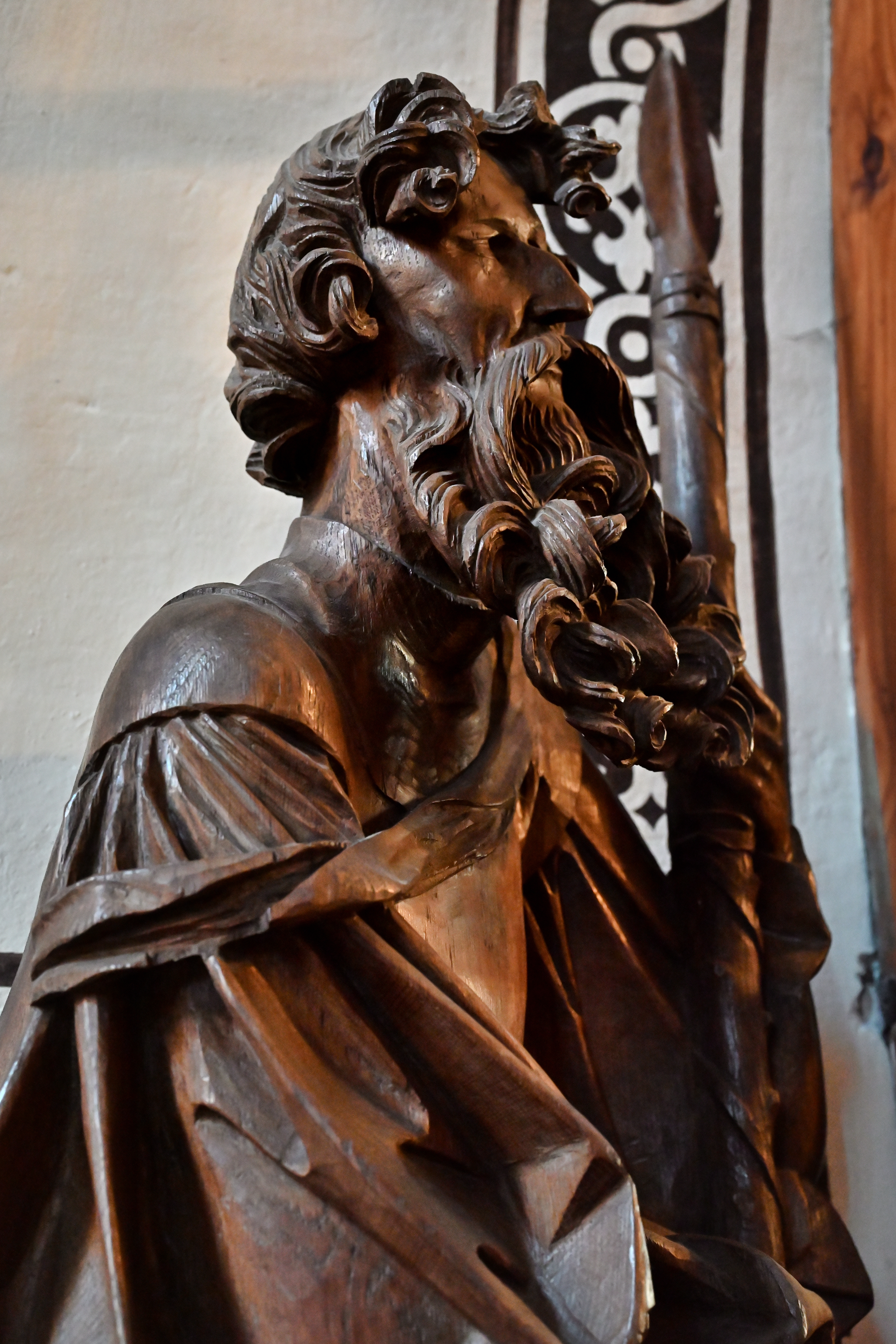
Thomas with the lance
