= Parumer See =

Lake in Germany

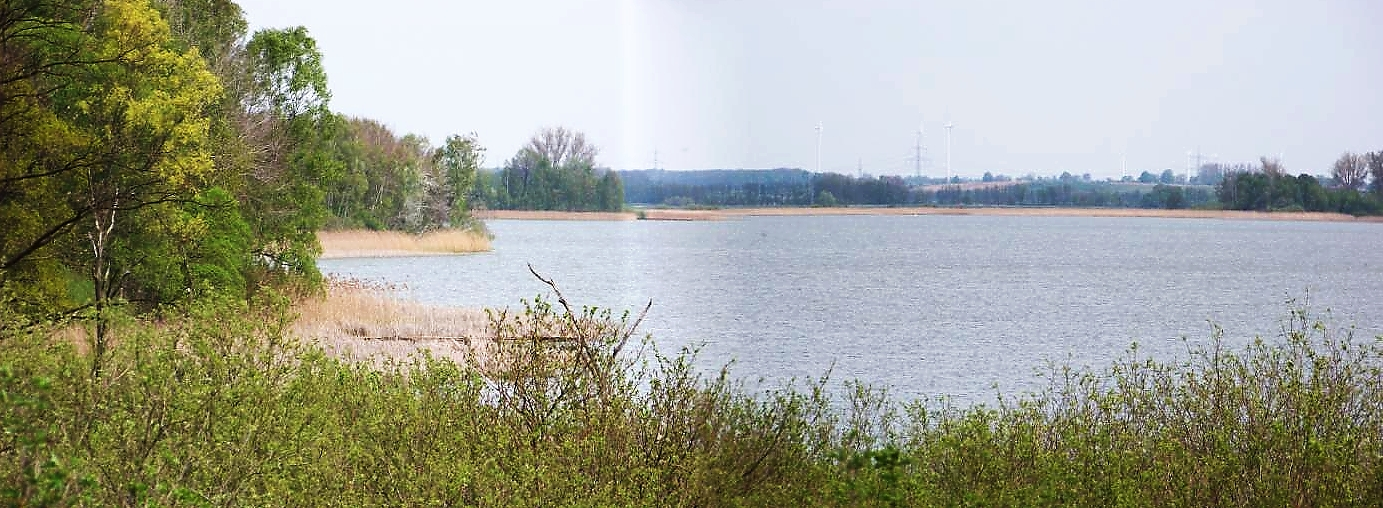

- Location within Mecklenburg-Vorpommern
- Location: Mecklenburg, Mecklenburg-Vorpommern
- Coordinates: 53°47′44″N 12°6′35″E
- Basin countries: Germany
- Surface area: 2.07 km^{2} (0.80 sq mi)
- Average depth: 1.92 m (6 ft 4 in)
- Max. depth: 2.8 m (9 ft 2 in)
- Water volume: 3,990,000 m^{3} (141,000,000 cu ft)
- Shore length^{1}: 8.7 km (5.4 mi)
- Surface elevation: 3.6 m (12 ft)
- ^{1} Shore length is not a well-defined measure.

Parumer See is a lake in Mecklenburg, Mecklenburg-Vorpommern, Germany. At an elevation of 3.6 m, its surface area is 2.07 km².
