= List of consorts of Mecklenburg =

This is a list of the duchesses and grand duchesses; the consorts of the duke Mecklenburg and later the grand duke of Mecklenburg-Schwerin and Strelitz

== Duchess of Mecklenburg ==
=== Mecklenburg-Schwerin Line (III) ===
Picture	Name	Father	Birth	Marriage	Became Duchess	Ceased to be Duchess	Death	Spouse
	Sophie Charlotte of Hesse-Kassel	Charles I, Landgrave of Hesse-Kassel (Hesse-Darmstadt)	16 July 1678	2 January 1704		31 July 1713 husband's death	30 May 1749	Frederick William I
	Catherine Ivanovna of Russia	Ivan V of Russia (Romanov)	20 October 1691	19 April 1716		1728 husband's abdication	14 June 1733	Karl Leopold
	Gustave Caroline of Mecklenburg-Strelitz	Adolphus Frederick II, Duke of Mecklenburg-Strelitz (Mecklenburg-Strelitz)	12 July 1694	13 November 1714	1728 husband's ascension	13 April 1748		Christian Ludwig II
	Louise Frederica of Württemberg	Frederick Louis, Hereditary Prince of Württemberg (Württemberg)	3 February 1722	2 March 1746	30 May 1756 husband's ascension	24 April 1785 husband's death	2 August 1791	Frederick II
	Louise of Saxe-Gotha-Altenburg	Prince John August of Saxe-Gotha-Altenburg (Saxe-Gotha-Altenburg)	9 March 1756	1 June 1775	24 April 1785 husband's ascension	1 January 1808		Frederick Francis I

=== Mecklenburg-Strelitz Line ===
Picture	Name	Father	Birth	Marriage	Became Duchess	Ceased to be Duchess	Death	Spouse
	Johanna of Saxe-Gotha-Altenburg	Frederick I, Duke of Saxe-Gotha-Altenburg (Saxe-Gotha-Altenburg)	1 October 1680	20 June 1702		9 July 1704		Adolphus Frederick II
	Christiane Emilie of Schwarzburg-Sondershausen	Christian William I, Prince of Schwarzburg-Sondershausen (Schwarzburg-Sondershausen)	30 Mar 1681	10 June 1705		12 May 1708 husband's death	1 November 1751	Adolphus Frederick II
	Dorothea of Schleswig-Holstein-Sonderburg-Plön	John Adolphus, Duke of Schleswig-Holstein-Sonderburg-Plön (Oldenburg)	4 December 1692	16 April 1709		11 December 1752 husband's death	29 Apr 1765	Adolphus Frederick III

== Grand Duchess of Mecklenburg ==
=== Mecklenburg-Schwerin Line (III) ===
Picture	Name	Father	Birth	Marriage	Became Grand Duchess	Ceased to be Grand Duchess	Death	Spouse
	Alexandrine of Prussia	Frederick William III of Prussia (Hohenzollern)	23 February 1803	25 May 1822	1 February 1837 husband's ascension	7 March 1842 husband's death	21 April 1892	Paul Frederick
	Augusta Reuss of Köstritz	Heinrich LXIII, Prince Reuss of Köstritz (Reuss of Köstritz)	26 May 1822	3 November 1849		3 March 1862		Frederick Francis II
	Anna of Hesse and by Rhine	Prince Karl of Hesse and by Rhine (Hesse-Darmstadt)	25 May 1843	4 July 1864		16 April 1865		Frederick Francis II
	Marie of Schwarzburg-Rudolstadt	Prince Adolph of Schwarzburg-Rudolstadt (Schwarzburg-Rudolstadt)	29 January 1850	4 July 1868		15 April 1883 husband's death	22 April 1922	Frederick Francis II
	Anastasia Mikhailovna of Russia	Grand Duke Michael Nikolaevich of Russia (Holstein-Gottorp-Romanov)	28 July 1860	24 January 1879	15 April 1883 husband's ascension	10 April 1897 husband's death	11 March 1922	Frederick Francis III
	Alexandra of Hanover	Ernest Augustus, Crown Prince of Hanover (Hanover)	29 September 1882	7 June 1904		14 November 1918 husband's abdication	30 August 1963	Frederick Francis IV

=== Mecklenburg-Strelitz Line ===
Picture	Name	Father	Birth	Marriage	Became Grand Duchess	Ceased to be Grand Duchess	Death	Spouse
	Marie of Hesse-Kassel	Landgrave Frederick of Hesse-Kassel (Hesse-Kassel)	21 January 1796	12 August 1817		6 September 1860 husband's death	30 December 1880	George
	Augusta of Cambridge	Prince Adolphus, Duke of Cambridge (Hanover)	19 July 1822	28 June 1843	6 September 1860 husband's ascension	30 May 1904 husband's death	5 December 1916	Frederick William
	Elisabeth of Anhalt	Frederick I, Duke of Anhalt (Ascania)	7 September 1857	17 April 1877	30 May 1904 husband's ascension	11 June 1914 husband's death	20 July 1933	Adolphus Frederick V

== See also ==
- List of rulers of Mecklenburg
