= Louis, Hereditary Prince of Mecklenburg-Schwerin =

German noble (1725–1778)

Louis of Mecklenburg-Schwerin
- Hereditary Prince of Mecklenburg-Schwerin
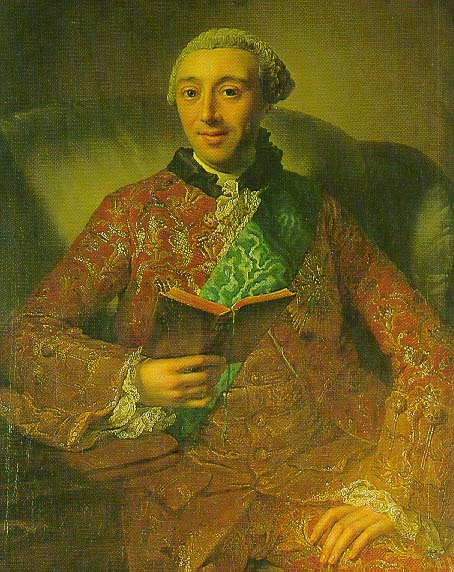
- Portrait by Georg David Matthieu
- Born: 6 August 1725; Grabow, Mecklenburg-Schwerin
- Died: 12 September 1778 (aged 53); Schwerin, Mecklenburg-Schwerin
- Burial: Schelf Church
- Spouse: Princess Charlotte Sophie of Saxe-Coburg-Saalfeld (m. 1755)
- Issue: Frederick Francis I, Grand Duke of Mecklenburg-Schwerin; Sophia Frederica, Hereditary Princess of Denmark and Norway
- House: Mecklenburg
- Father: Christian Louis II, Duke of Mecklenburg-Schwerin
- Mother: Duchess Gustave Caroline of Mecklenburg-Strelitz

Louis, Hereditary Prince of Mecklenburg-Schwerin (German: Ludwig zu Mecklenburg; 6 August 1725 – 12 September 1778) was heir to the Dukedom of Mecklenburg-Schwerin from 1756 until his death in 1778. He was also the father of the first Grand Duke of Mecklenburg-Schwerin, Frederick Francis I.

== Early life ==
Louis was born at Grabow, Mecklenburg-Schwerin, third child and second son of Christian Louis II, Duke of Mecklenburg-Schwerin (1683–1756), (son of Frederick, Duke of Mecklenburg-Grabow and Landgravine Christine Wilhelmine of Hesse-Homburg) and his wife, Duchess Gustave Caroline of Mecklenburg-Strelitz (1694–1748), (daughter of Adolphus Frederick II, Duke of Mecklenburg-Strelitz and Duchess Marie of Mecklenburg-Güstrow).

After the death of the father in 1756, his brother Frederick succeed to the Dukedom. Since his brother died without any surviving issue he was appointed heir, but he died in 1778, and at the death of his brother in 1785 his son Frederick Francis, succeeded as the Duke of Mecklenburg-Schwerin who later became the Grand Duke of Mecklenburg-Schwerin.

== Marriage ==
Louis married 13 May 1755 at Schwerin to Princess Charlotte Sophie of Saxe-Coburg-Saalfeld (1731–1810), daughter of Francis Josias, Duke of Saxe-Coburg-Saalfeld, and his wife, Princess Anna Sophie of Schwarzburg-Rudolstadt.

They had one son and one daughter:

- Frederick Francis I, Grand Duke of Mecklenburg-Schwerin (10 December 1756 – 1 February 1837); married in 1775 Princess Louise of Saxe-Gotha-Altenburg, had issue.
- Duchess Sophia Frederica of Mecklenburg-Schwerin (24 August 1758 – 29 November 1794); married in 1774 to Frederick, Hereditary Prince of Denmark and Norway, had issue.

== Ancestry ==
Ancestors of Louis, Hereditary Prince of Mecklenburg-Schwerin

8. Adolphus Frederick I, Duke of Mecklenburg-Schwerin
4. Frederick, Duke of Mecklenburg-Grabow
9. Duchess Maria Katharina of Brunswick-Dannenberg
2. Christian Louis II, Duke of Mecklenburg-Schwerin
10. William Christoph, Landgrave of Hesse-Homburg
5. Christine Wilhelmine of Hesse-Homburg
11. Sophia Eleonore of Hesse-Darmstadt
1. Louis, Hereditary Prince o Mecklenburg-Schwerin
12. Adolphus Frederick I, Duke of Mecklenburg-Schwerin (= 8)
6. Adolphus Frederick II, Duke of Mecklenburg-Strelitz
13. Duchess Maria Katharina of Brunswick-Dannenberg (= 9)
3. Duchess Gustave Caroline of Mecklenburg-Strelitz
14. Gustav Adolph, Duke of Mecklenburg-Güstrow
7. Marie of Mecklenburg-Güstrow
15. Magdalena Sibylla of Holstein-Gottorp

== Bibliography ==
- Genealogisches Handbuch des Adels, Fürstliche Häuser, Reference: 1956
- Het Groothertogelijk Huis Mecklenburg, Bergen-op-Zoom, 1901–1902, Juten, W. J. F., Reference: 106
