= Frederick II of Mecklenburg-Schwerin =

Duke of Mecklenburg-Schwerin from 1756 to 1785

Frederick II
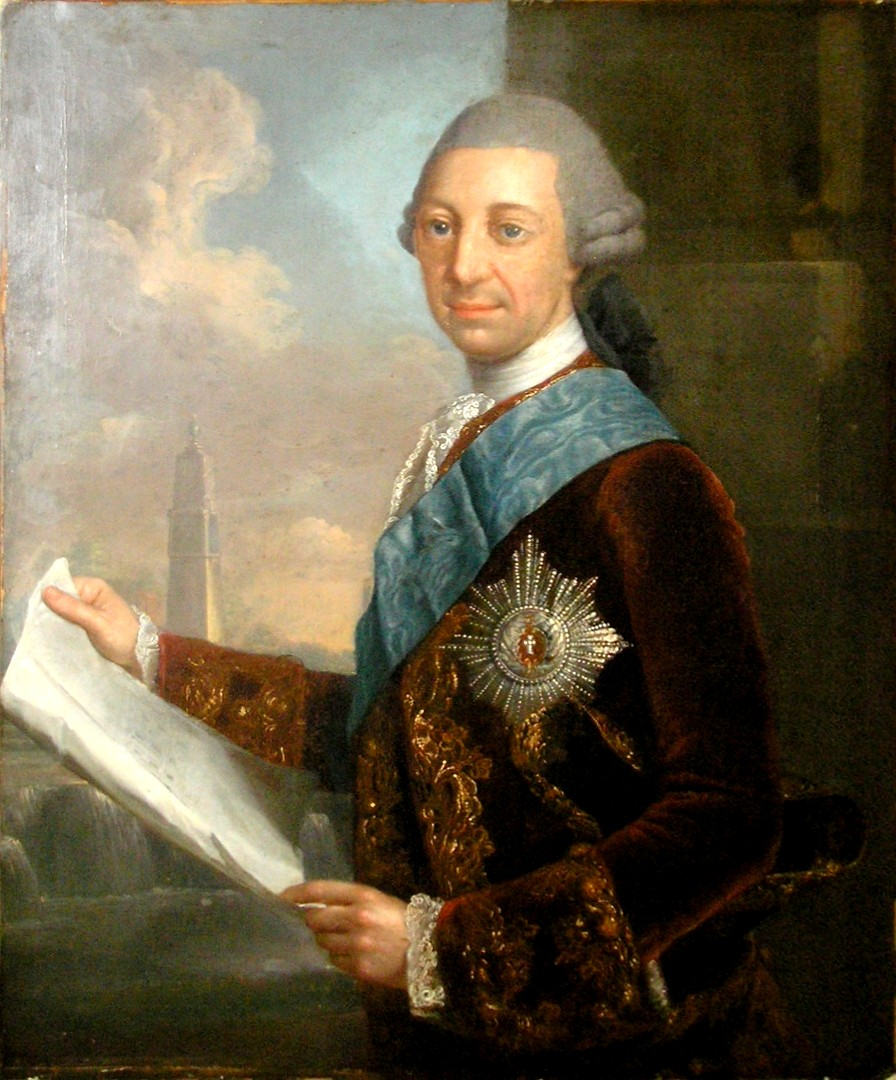

Duke of Mecklenburg-Schwerin
- Reign: 30 May 1756 – 21 April 1785
- Predecessor: Christian Ludwig II
- Successor: Friedrich Franz I
- Born: 9 November 1717; Schwerin, Mecklenburg-Schwerin
- Died: 21 April 1785 (aged 67); Ludwigslust, Mecklenburg-Schwerin
- Spouse: Duchess Louise Frederica of Württemberg (m. 1746)
Names
- German: Friedrich
- House: House of Mecklenburg
- Father: Christian Ludwig II, Duke of Mecklenburg-Schwerin
- Mother: Duchess Gustave Caroline of Mecklenburg-Strelitz

Frederick II, Duke of Mecklenburg-Schwerin, called the Pious, (German: Friedrich II Herzog von Mecklenburg-Schwerin; 9 November 1717 – 21 April 1785) was Duke of Mecklenburg-Schwerin from 1756 until his death.

== Early life ==
Frederick was born at Schwerin, the son of Christian Ludwig II, Duke of Mecklenburg, and his wife, Duchess Gustave Caroline of Mecklenburg-Strelitz.

In his childhood and youth his great-aunt Duchess Augusta of Mecklenburg-Güstrow had great influence on the intellectual and spiritual development of Frederick, essentially in instilling the beliefs of Pietism.

== Duke of Mecklenburg-Schwerin ==
After the death of his father in 1756, Frederick assumed the government of the Duchy. Shortly after his accession the country was involved in the Seven Years' War.

Frederick was a supporter of Pietism. He encouraged the school system, promoted textile manufacturing and abolished torture. In 1764 he moved his residence from Schwerin to Schloss Ludwigslust. In 1765 he ordered the construction of the Imperial Church (completed in 1770, now the City Church) by architect Johann Joachim Busch, and he continued the expansion of Schloss Ludwigslust between 1772 and 1776.

== Marriage ==
Frederick was married on 2 March 1746 at Schwedt to Duchess Louise Frederica of Württemberg, the daughter of Frederick Louis, Hereditary Prince of Württemberg, and his wife Margravine Henrietta Maria of Brandenburg-Schwedt. They had no children.

At his death, the duchy was inherited by his nephew Frederick Francis, a son of his brother Louis.

== Ancestry ==
Ancestors of Frederick II of Mecklenburg-Schwerin

8. Adolf Frederick I, Duke of Mecklenburg-Schwerin
4. Frederick, Duke of Mecklenburg-Grabow
9. Duchess Marie Katharina of Brunswick-Dannenberg
2. Christian Ludwig II, Duke of Mecklenburg-Schwerin
10. William Christoph, Landgrave of Hesse-Homburg
5. Christine Wilhelmine of Hesse-Homburg
11. Sophia Eleonore of Hesse-Darmstadt
1. Frederick II, Duke of Mecklenburg-Schwerin
12. Adolf Frederick I, Duke of Mecklenburg-Schwerin (= 8)
6. Adolphus Frederick II, Duke of Mecklenburg-Strelitz
13. Duchess Marie Katharina of Brunswick-Dannenberg (= 9)
3. Duchess Gustave Caroline of Mecklenburg-Strelitz
14. Gustav Adolph, Duke of Mecklenburg-Güstrow
7. Duchess Marie of Mecklenburg-Güstrow
15. Princess Magdalene Sibylle of Holstein-Gottorp

Frederick II of Mecklenburg-Schwerin House of Mecklenburg Born: 9 November 1717 Died: 21 April 1785
Regnal titles
Preceded by Christian Ludwig II	Duke of Mecklenburg-Schwerin; 1756–1785	Succeeded by Frederick Francis I
