= Adolf Frederick (disambiguation) =

Adolf Frederick (1710–1771) was King of Sweden from 1751 until his death in 1771.

Adolf Frederick, Adolphus Frederick or Adolf Friedrich may also refer to:

- Adolphus Frederick I (1588–1658), Duke of Mecklenburg-Schwerin
- Adolphus Frederick II (1658–1708), Duke of Mecklenburg-Strelitz
- Adolphus Frederick III (1686–1752), Duke of Mecklenburg-Strelitz
- Adolphus Frederick IV (1738–1794), Duke of Mecklenburg-Strelitz
- Adolphus Frederick V (1848–1914), Duke of Mecklenburg-Strelitz
- Adolphus Frederick VI (1882–1918), Grand Duke of Mecklenburg-Strelitz
- Prince Adolphus, Duke of Cambridge (1774–1850), born Adolphus Frederick
- Adolf Friedrich von Schack (1815–1894), German poet, literary historian, and art collector
- Duke Adolf Friedrich of Mecklenburg (1873–1969), German colonial politician and African explorer
