= Ludwigslust Palace =

Schloss in Mecklenburg-Vorpommern, Germany

Coordinates: 53°19′29″N 11°29′17″E

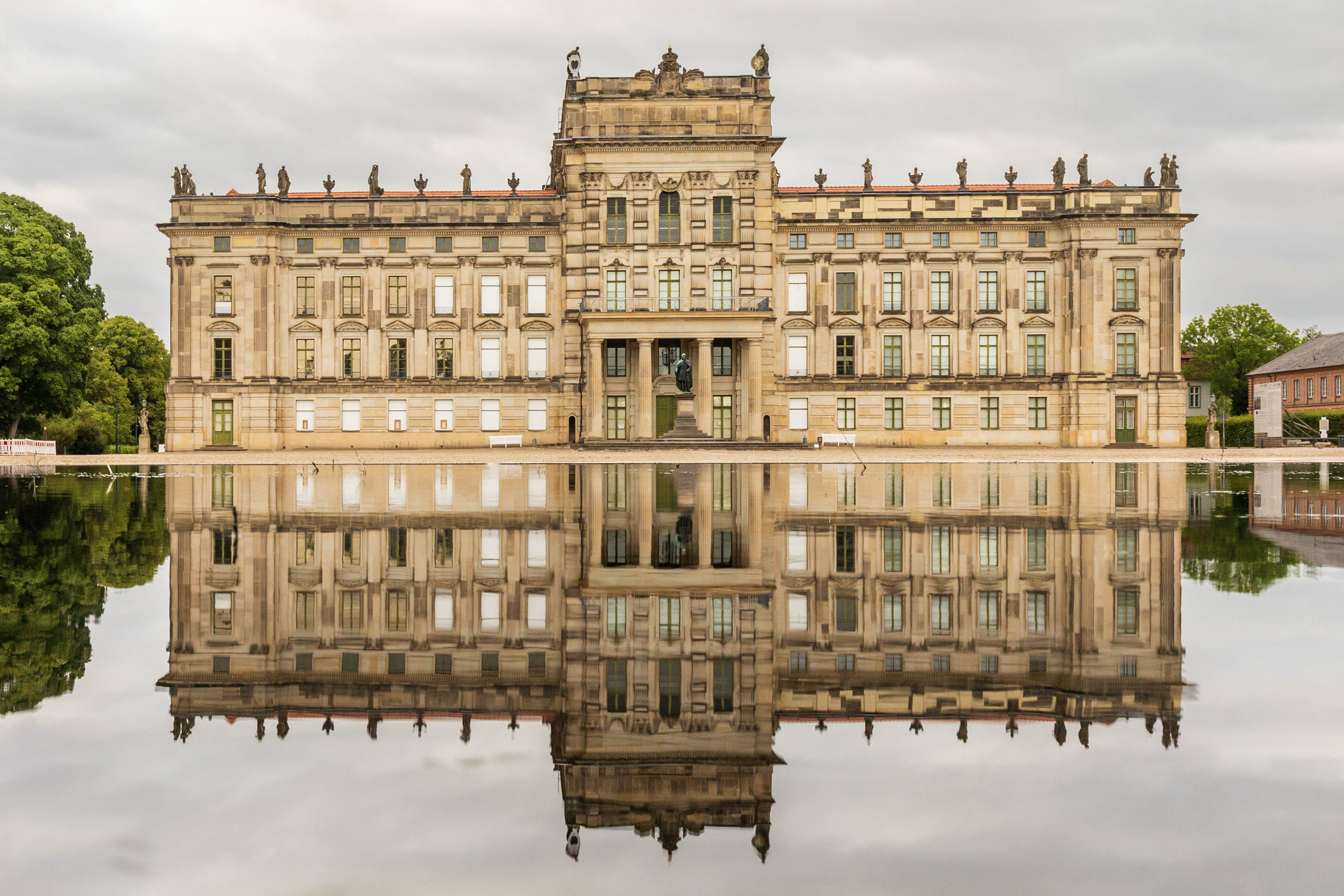
Ludwigslust: the entrance front reflected in its basin

Ludwigslust Palace (German: Schloss Ludwigslust) is a stately home or schloss in the town of Ludwigslust, Mecklenburg-Vorpommern, northern Germany. It was built as a hunting lodge and rebuilt as a retreat from the ducal capital, Schwerin, and then became, from 1765 to 1837, the center of government. It was the joy of Prince Christian Ludwig, the heir of the Duke of Mecklenburg-Schwerin, hence the name Ludwigslust.

== Origins ==
Ludwigslust had its origins in a simple hunting lodge within a day's ride (36 km) of the ducal capital, Schwerin. In 1724, Prince Christian Ludwig, the heir of the Duke of Mecklenburg-Schwerin, decided to build a hunting lodge on this site, near a hamlet called Klenow. Even after he became the reigning duke in his turn in 1747, he passed most of his time at this residence, which he called Ludwigslust ("Ludwig's joy").

== Residence ==
In 1765, Frederick II, Duke of Mecklenburg-Schwerin made Ludwigslust the capital of the duchy instead of Schwerin. Consequently, the little town that had already grown in the service of the schloss was further expanded, and a cornerstone for a new, grander residenz was laid directly behind the old hunting box in 1768. In the years 1772–1776, Ludwigslust was rebuilt to plans by Johann Joachim Busch. The Late Baroque schloss is built on an E-plan foundation, with a higher projecting central corps de logis in three bays, which appears to penetrate its wings from front to rear; the richer Corinthian order of the central block contrasts with the Ionic of the wings. On the urban side, the central block makes some compromises with the new neoclassical style in the flat planes of the façade, which simply occupies one flank of the square centered on it, without embracing the space in a cour d'honneur (illustration, below left) and in the severe Doric portico. The structure is brick, clad in the local sandstone; forty over-lifesize allegorical figures, also in sandstone, by Rudolf Kaplunger, alternating with vases, crown the low attic above the cornice.

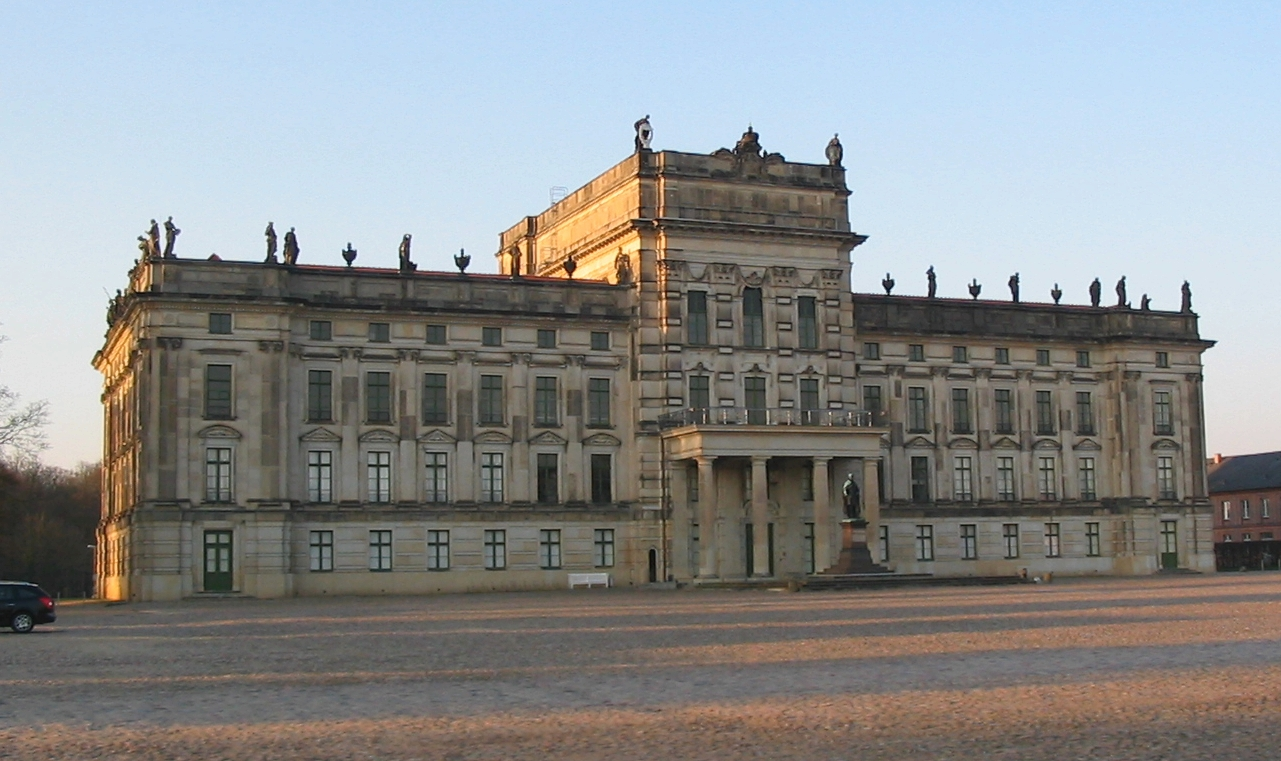
Ludwigslust: the entrance front facing the Platz

The interiors of Ludwigslust are more fully neoclassical. The grand reception rooms are on the piano nobile, or Festetage ("Reception floor"), above a low ground floor that contained guestrooms. The Goldener Saal ("Gilded Hall") in the central block rises through two storeys, with a colossal order of Corinthian columns and massive decorations carried out in stucco and the innovative moldable and modelable paper-maché called Ludwigsluster Carton; it is used today for summertime concerts. One flanking range was semi-public, with a sequence of an antechamber, salon, audience chamber, and a gallery. The opposite range was semi-private, with the Duke's drawing-room and bedchamber (hung with framed miniatures), a cabinet, and a gallery with a porcelain chimneypiece.

The schloss was the center-point of a range of grand buildings sited in deference to it, including the Hofkirche that served as the court chapel. A central avenue through the town was laid out, centered on the schloss; on the garden side, the axis was carried through as the Hofdamenallee ("Court ladies' allée"), a central ride through the enclosing woodland, still reaching the slightly elevated wooded horizon today.

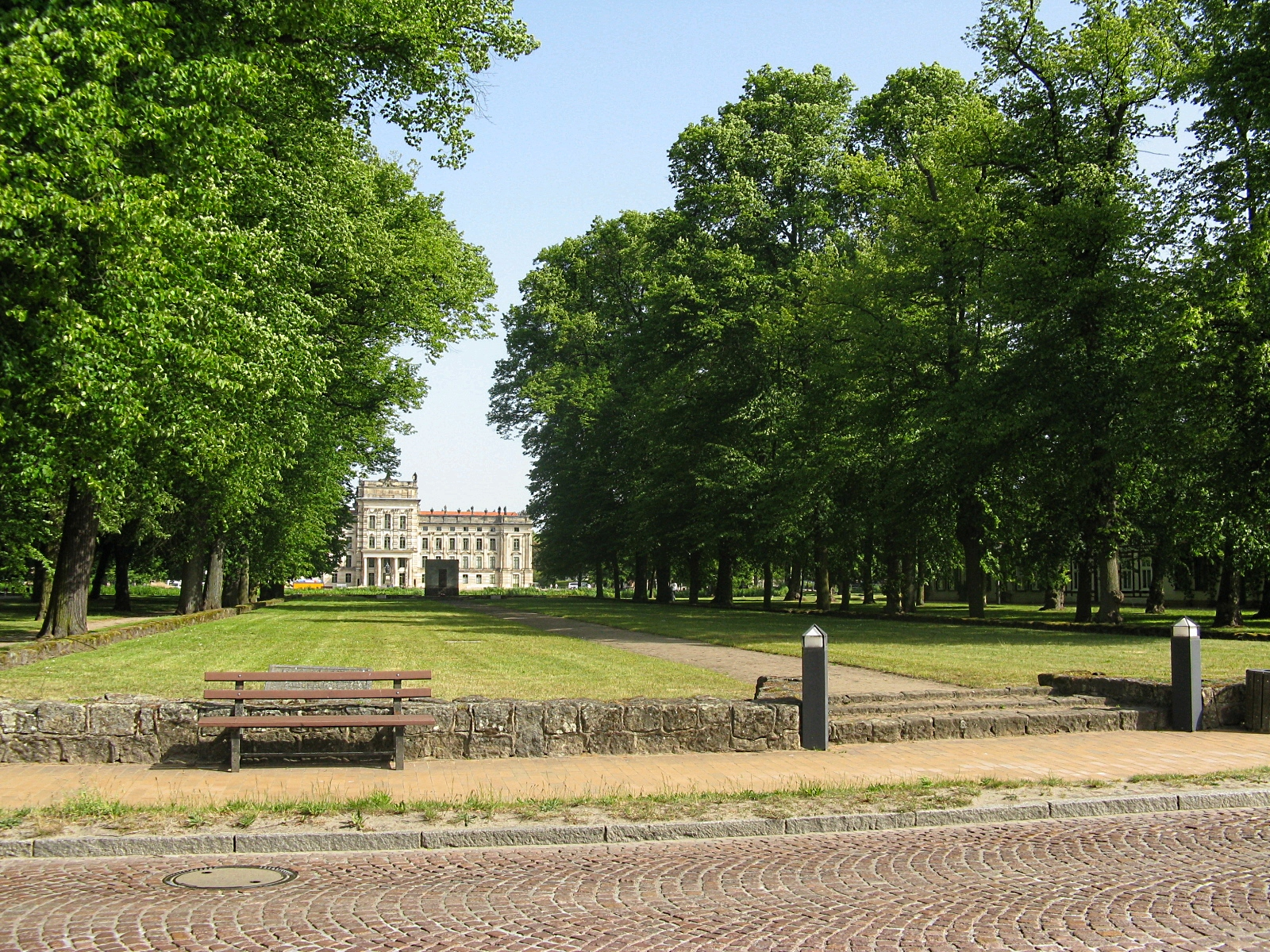
The garden front from the axial Hofdamenallee, a memorial and grave field for 200 inmates of Wöbbelin concentration camp

The palace's surrounding Schlosspark of 120 ha. was laid out with formal canals, fountains and a frankly artificial cascade, tamed of all the wildness that a later, Romantic generation would venerate; it was built according to sketches by the French architect Jean-Laurent Le Geay, who had laid out the formal garden at Schwerin in 1749–55, but was quickly overtaken at Ludwigslust by his assistant, Johann Joachim Busch, who began the work in 1763. The trees laid out in the pattern and at the scale of Bernini's colonnades in Piazza San Pietro have disappeared, but there are the neoclassical stone bridge designed by Busch about 1780, with a cascade that falls across a lip so perfectly regular that it has the name Der Waltze (the "Roll"), a grotto built as a ruin, a Gothic chapel, two mausoleums and a monument to a favourite horse.

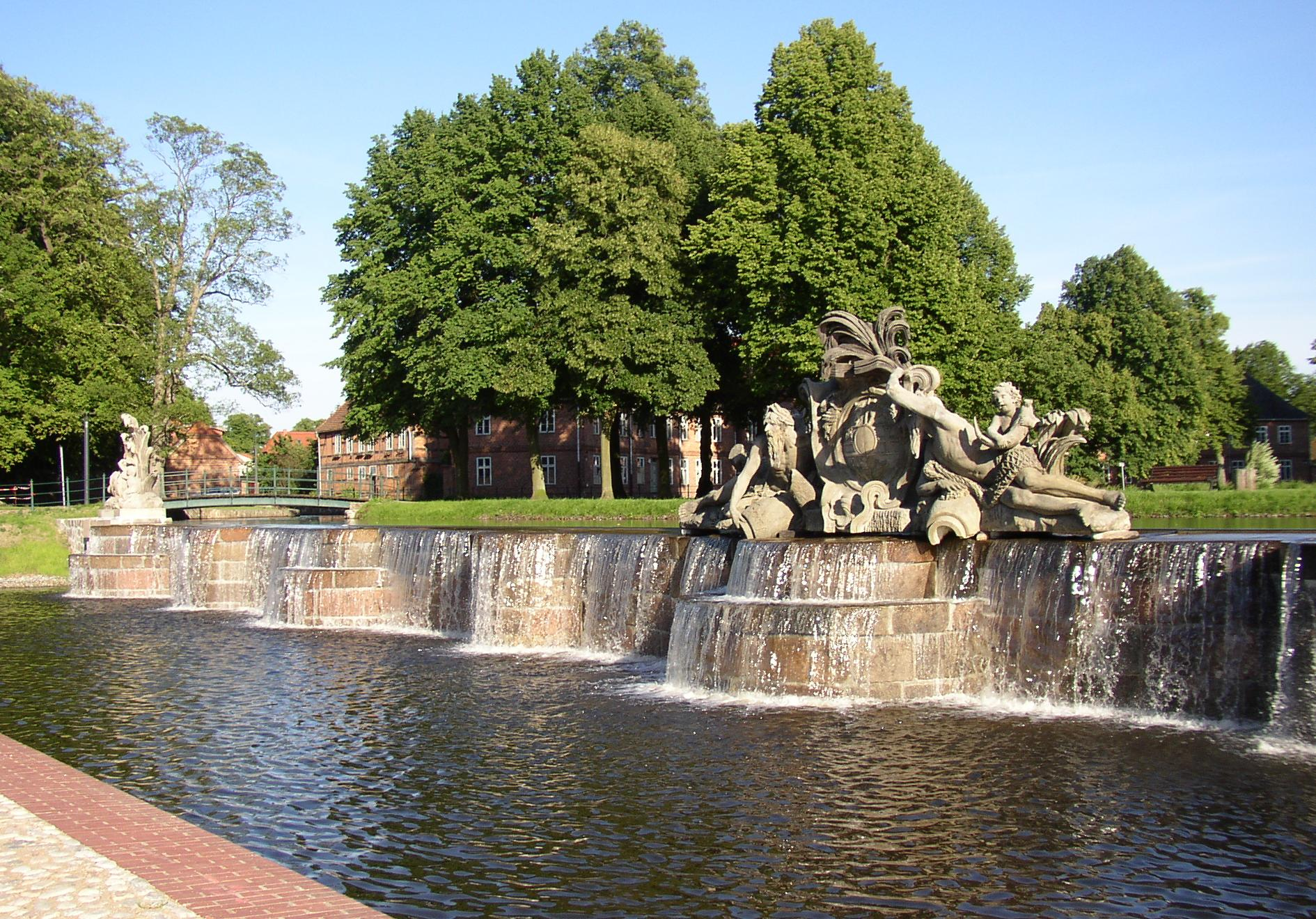
Cascade

In 1837, Grand Duke Paul Friedrich returned Schwerin to its capital status. As a summer residence, Schloss Ludwigslust was preserved from further alterations. In the mid-nineteenth century, much of the park was re-landscaped in the more naturalistic English landscape garden manner, under the direction of a garden designer with an extensive clientele among the German aristocracy, Peter Joseph Lenné. Water near the schloss was recast in more naturalistic manner and the surrounding woodland edges were varied, with clumps of trees as outliers, but the main axia Hofdamenallee centered on the palace, still stretches dead straight through the woods, and the narrow Great Canal, laid out at an angle to one side, still extends a kilometer and a half.

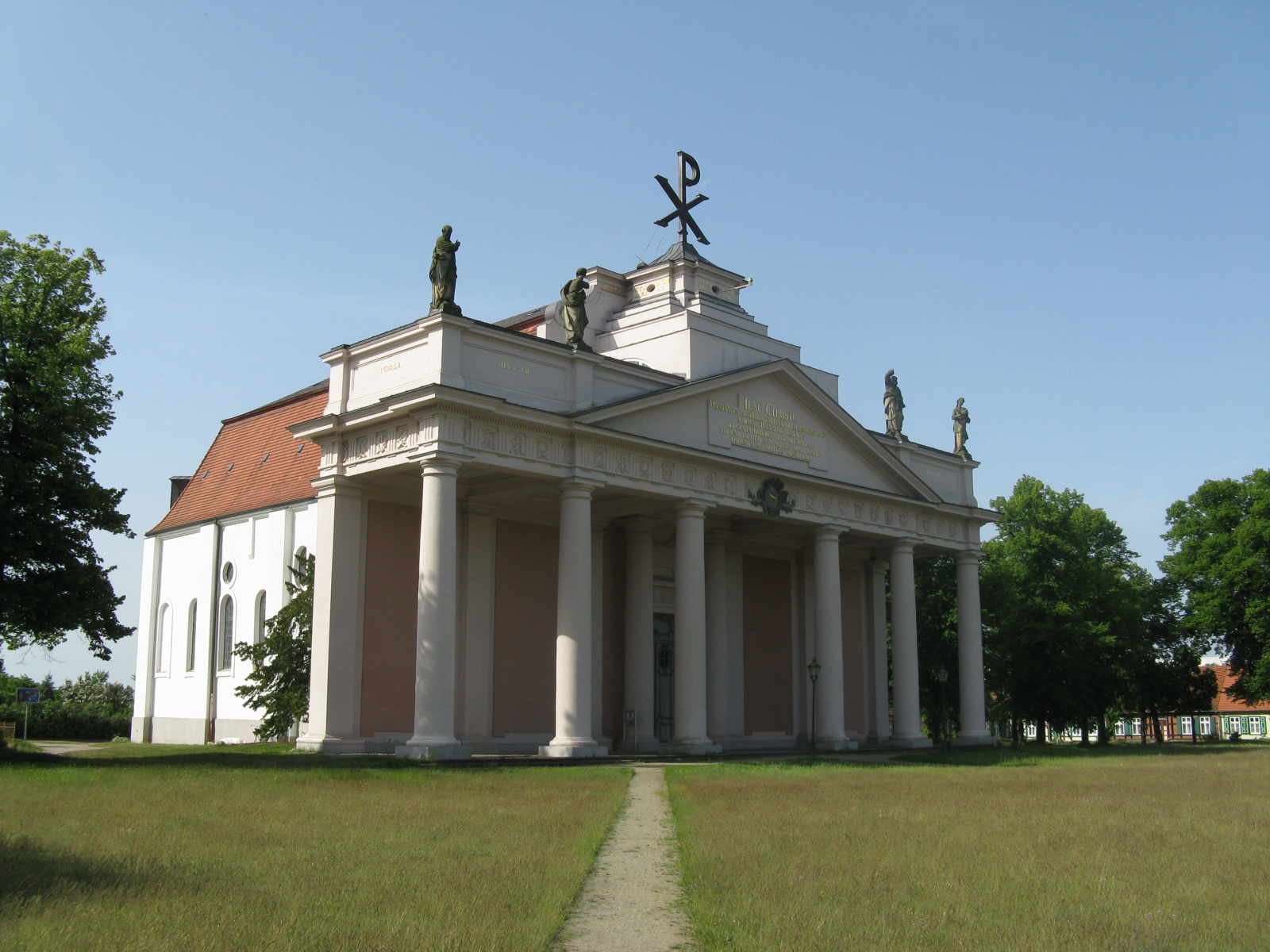
Former Hofkirche of 1803-09

The deposed Mecklenburg-Schwerin family continued to use Ludwigslust until 1945. Today, it houses the Staatliches Museum Schwerin/Ludwigslust/Güstrow (the "State Museum of Schwerin/Ludwigslust/Güstrow"), with a collection of paintings by Jean-Baptiste Oudry and busts by Jean Antoine Houdon that represent the tastes of the Mecklenburg dukes.

In 1844, William Makepeace Thackeray set a high-living episode of his amoral eighteenth-century hero Barry Lyndon at Ludwigslust, where Barry, pursuing a countess, is accompanied by a Black page named Zamor who is dressed in Turkish attire, and his pavilion is "fitted up in the Eastern manner, very splendid.
