= Duchess Gustave Caroline of Mecklenburg-Strelitz =

Gustave Caroline of Mecklenburg-Strelitz
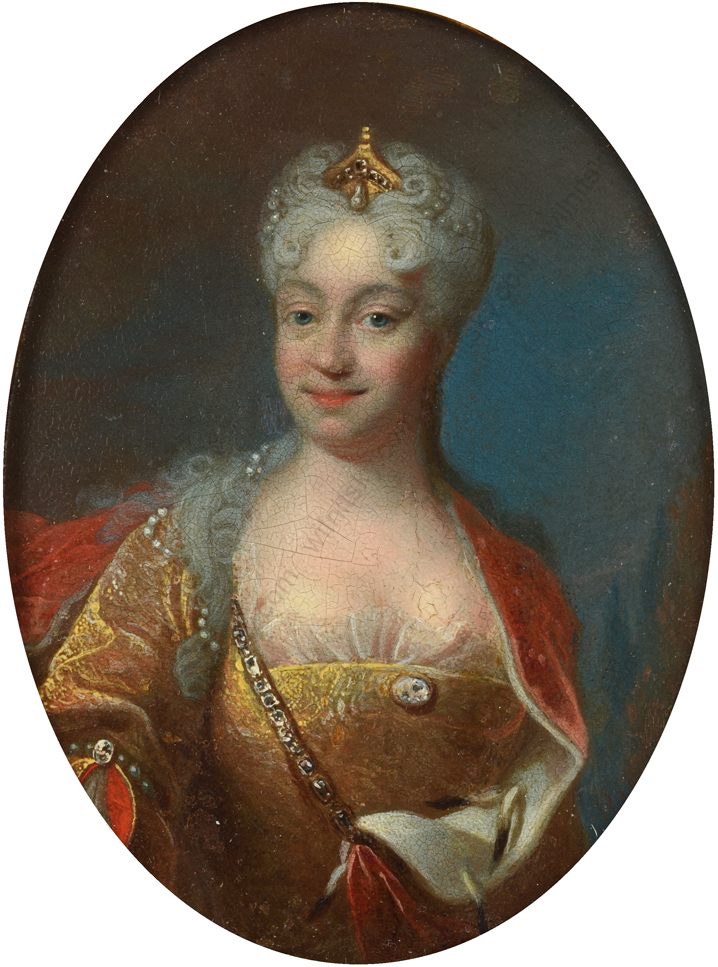
- Portrait attributed to Ádám Mányoki, c. 1720

Duchess consort of Mecklenburg-Schwerin
- Tenure: 1728 – 13 April 1748
- Born: 12 July 1694
- Died: 13 April 1748 (aged 53)
- Spouse: Christian Ludwig II, Duke of Mecklenburg (m. 1714)
- Issue: Frederick II, Duke of Mecklenburg-Schwerin; Duchess Ulrike Sofie; Duke Louis; Duchess Luise; Duchess Amalie
Names
- Gustave Caroline
- House: Mecklenburg-Strelitz
- Father: Adolphus Frederick II, Duke of Mecklenburg
- Mother: Maria of Mecklenburg

Duchess Gustave Caroline of Mecklenburg-Strelitz (12 July 1694 – 13 April 1748) was the daughter of Adolphus Frederick II, Duke of Mecklenburg, and Princess Marie of Mecklenburg-Güstrow.

== Family ==
Gustave Caroline was the fourth daughter and youngest child of Adolphus Frederick II, Duke of Mecklenburg by his first wife Princess Maria of Mecklenburg. She was a younger sister of Adolphus Frederick III, Duke of Mecklenburg. Through her father's third marriage, she was an aunt of Queen Charlotte of the United Kingdom.

== Marriage ==
On 13 November 1714, Gustave Caroline married her cousin Christian Ludwig of Mecklenburg. He was the third eldest son of Frederick, Duke of Mecklenburg-Grabow and his wife Princess Christine Wilhelmine of Hesse-Homburg. Christian Ludwig succeeded as Duke of Mecklenburg-Schwerin in 1747, the year before Gustave Caroline's death.

They had five children:

- Frederick II, Duke of Mecklenburg-Schwerin (1717–1785); married Duchess Louise Frederica of Württemberg
- Louis (1725–78); married Princess Charlotte Sophie of Saxe-Coburg-Saalfeld (1731–1810). They were the parents of Frederick Francis I, Grand Duke of Mecklenburg-Schwerin.
- Ulrike Sofie (1723–1813)
- Luise (1730)
- Amalie (1732–1775)

== Ancestry ==
Ancestors of Duchess Gustave Caroline of Mecklenburg-Strelitz

8. Johann VII, Duke of Mecklenburg
4. Adolf Frederick I, Duke of Mecklenburg-Schwerin
9. Sophia of Schleswig-Holstein-Gottorp
2. Adolphus Frederick II, Duke of Mecklenburg
10. Julius Ernst, Duke of Brunswick-Lüneburg-Dannenberg
5. Maria Katharina of Brunswick-Dannenberg
11. Maria of East Frisia
1. Gustave Caroline of Mecklenburg-Strelitz
12. Johann Albrecht II, Duke of Mecklenburg
6. Duke Gustav Adolf of Mecklenburg
13. Eleonora Maria of Anhalt-Bernburg
3. Maria of Mecklenburg-Gustrow
14. Frederick III, Duke of Holstein-Gottorp
7. Magdalene Sibylle of Schleswig-Holstein-Gottorp
15. Duchess Marie Elisabeth of Saxony

Duchess Gustave Caroline of Mecklenburg-Strelitz House of Mecklenburg Born: 12 July 1694 Died: 13 April 1748
German royalty
Preceded by Tsarevna Catherine Ivanovna of Russia	Duchess consort of Mecklenburg-Schwerin; 1728 – 13 April 1748	Vacant Title next held by Duchess Louise Frederica of Württemberg
