= Christine Wilhelmine of Hesse-Homburg =

German noblewoman (1653–1722)

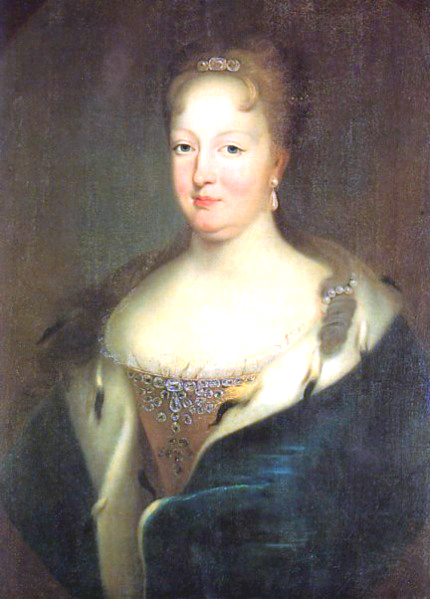
- Born: 30 June 1653; Bingenheim
- Died: 16 May 1722 (aged 68); Grabow
- Spouse: Frederick, Duke of Mecklenburg-Grabow (m. 1671; died 1688)
- Issue: Frederick William I; Carl Leopold; Christian Ludwig II; Sophie Louise, Queen in Prussia
- House: House of Hesse
- Father: William Christoph, Landgrave of Hesse-Homburg
- Mother: Sophia Eleonore of Hesse-Darmstadt

Landgravine Christine Wilhelmine of Hesse-Homburg (30 June 1653, in Bingenheim – 16 May 1722, in Grabow) was a German noblewoman, the elder daughter of William Christoph, Landgrave of Hesse-Homburg and his first wife Sophia Eleonore of Hesse-Darmstadt. Upon her marriage she became the Duchess of Mecklenburg-Grabow. Her great-grandson was Ivan VI of Russia.

== Marriage and issue ==
On 28 May 1671 she married Frederick, Duke of Mecklenburg-Grabow, son of Adolf Frederick I, Duke of Mecklenburg and Marie Katharina of Brunswick-Dannenberg. They had the following children:

- Frederick William I (28 March 1675 – 31 July 1713); married Sophie Charlotte of Hesse-Kassel (July 16, 1678 – May 30, 1749), daughter of Charles I, Landgrave of Hesse-Kassel; no children.
- Carl Leopold (26 November 1678 – 28 November 1747); married Catherine Ivanovna of Russia (sister of Empress Anna); their daughter was Grand Duchess Anna Leopoldovna of Russia, mother of Ivan VI of Russia.
- Christian Ludwig II (15 May 1683 – 30 May 1756); married his first cousin, Duchess Gustave Caroline of Mecklenburg-Strelitz; had five children.
- Sophie Louise (6 May 1685 – 29 July 1735); third wife of Frederick I of Prussia; no children.
