= Christian Louis I =

Duke of Mecklenburg-Schwerin from 1658 to 1692

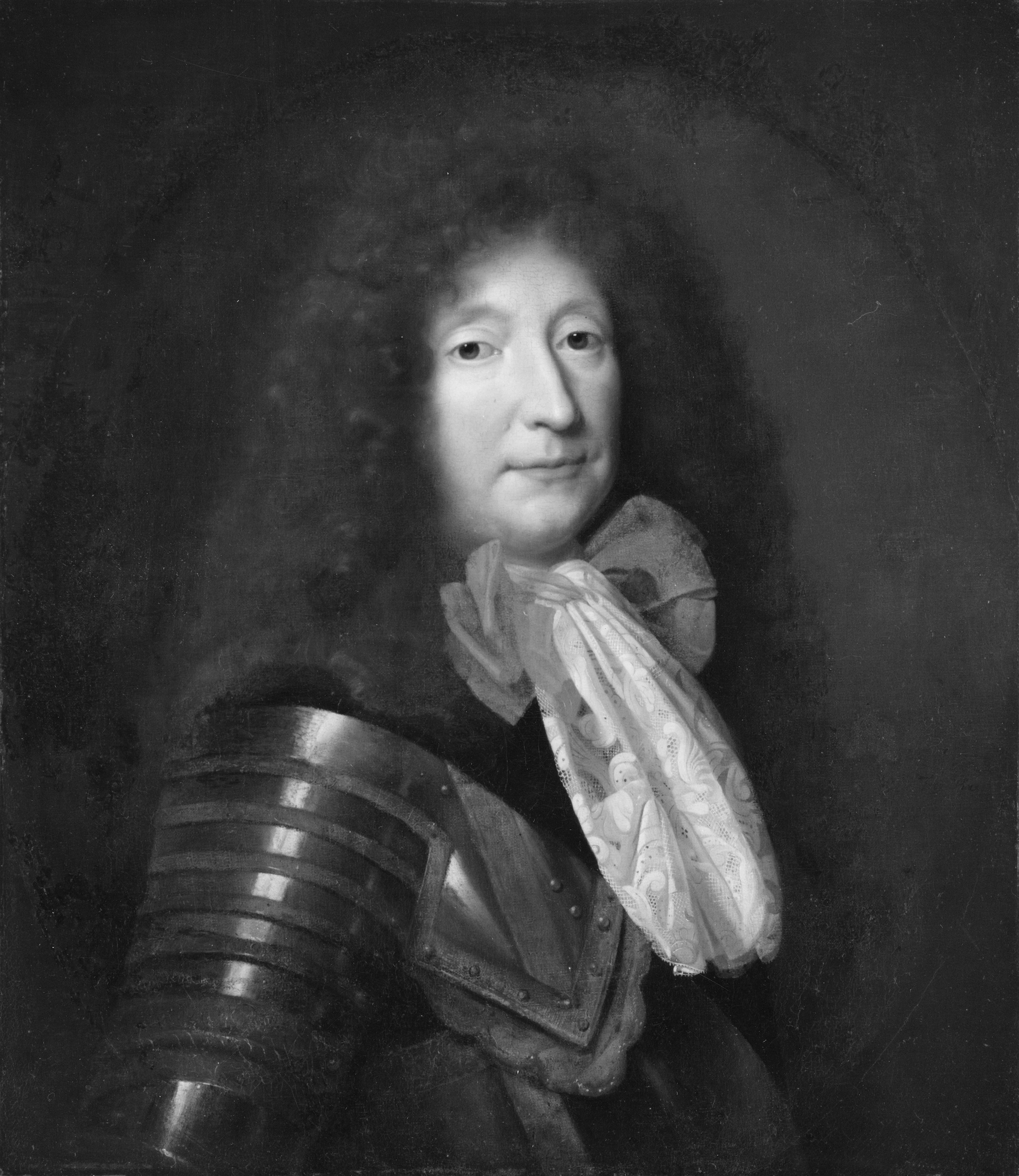
- Portrait by Francois de Troy

Duke of Mecklenburg-Schwerin
- Reign: 27 February 1658 - 21 June 1692
- Predecessor: Adolphus Frederick I
- Successor: Frederick William
- Born: 1 December 1623; Schwerin
- Died: 21 June 1692 (aged 68); The Hague
- Burial: Doberan Minster
- House: Mecklenburg
- Father: Adolf Frederick I, Duke of Mecklenburg
- Mother: Anna Maria of East Frisia

Christian Louis I (1 December 1623 in Schwerin – 21 June 1692 in The Hague) was a reigning duke of Mecklenburg-Schwerin.

== Life ==
Christian Louis I was born as Christian I, the son of the Duke Adolf Frederick I and his wife, Anna Maria (1601–1634), the daughter of Count Enno III of East Frisia.

On 26 August 1625, when he was only one year old, his father proposed that he be the next administrator of the Bishopric of Schwerin. However, he was never appointed, because when Administrator Ulrik III died on 12 August 1633, the Bishopric fell to Wallenstein as a completed fief. He inherited Mecklenburg-Schwerin when his father died on 27 February 1658. In 1660, he built a Lustschloss near the Ratzeburg Minster. He travelled to Paris in 1662, to the court of Louis XIV. On 29 September 1663, he converted to the Catholic faith. The next day, his godfather Louis XIV gave him the second name Louis. Later, however, he often signed only with Christian.

He died on 21 June [O.S. 11 June] 1692 in The Hague. His body was transported by ship to Dömitz. It was then transported to Schwerin and finally arrived on 24 August 1692 in Doberan, where he was buried in the Doberan Minster.

== Marriages ==
He married twice. His first wife was Christine Margarethe of Mecklenburg-Güstrow (31 March 1615 – 16 August 1666), the second daughter of Duke John Albert II. She was the widow of Duke Francis Albert of Saxe-Lauenburg, whom she had married on 21 February [O.S. 11 February] 1640. Francis Albert had died on 10 June 1642 from wounds he had received in the battle of Świdnica. She married Christian on 6 July 1650 in Hamburg. However, on 16 October 1660, a divorce was pronounced by an ecclesiastical court composed specifically for this case by Christian. She never recognized the divorce. It was, however, declared valid by a committee of ten professors of canon law of the University of Paris the Sorbonne. The divorce was confirmed by the Pope on 3 October 1663.

His second wife was Elisabeth Angelique de Montmorency, Duchess of Châtillon and Coligny, (b. 1626). She was the widow Gaspard IV de Coligny, the son of Gaspard III de Coligny. Her first husband had died at Charenton-le-Pont on 9 February 1649 during the Fronde. The exact date of Elisabeth Angelique's wedding to Christian Louis is not known with certainty, but it was probably on 3 March 1664. She died on 23 or 24 January [O.S. 13 or 14 January] 1695 in Paris.

Both marriages were childless. When Christian Louis I died, he was succeeded by his nephew Frederick William, the eldest son of Duke Frederick of Mecklenburg-Grabow.

== Ancestry ==
Ancestors of Christian Louis I

8. John Albert I, Duke of Mecklenburg
4. John VII, Duke of Mecklenburg-Schwerin
9. Anna Sophia of Prussia
2. Adolphus Frederick I, Duke of Mecklenburg-Schwerin
10. Adolf, Duke of Holstein-Gottorp
5. Sophia of Holstein-Gottorp
11. Christine of Hesse
1. Christian Louis I, Duke of Mecklenburg
12. Edzard II, Count of East Frisia
6. Enno III, Count of East Frisia
13. Catherine Vasa of Sweden
3. Anna Maria of Ostfriesland
14. Adolf, Duke of Holstein-Gottorp (=10)
7. Anna of Holstein-Gottorp
15. Christine of Hesse (=11)

Christian Louis I House of Mecklenburg Born: 1 December 1623 Died: 21 June 1692
| Preceded by Adolf Frederick I | Duke of Mecklenburg-Schwerin; 1658-1692 | Succeeded by Frederick William |
