= Georg Joachim Mark =

German theologian

- Born: 1 March 1726; Schwerin
- Died: 5 March 1774 (aged 48)
- Alma mater: Kiel University
- Occupation: University teacher; librarian; theologian
- Employer: Kiel University

Georg Joachim Mark or Georg Joachim Märk (1 March 1726 – 5 March 1774) was a German theologian. He was born at Schwerin March 1, 1726; was educated at the University of Kiel; in 1745 entered the ministry; and in 1747 was appointed a member of the philosophical faculty of his alma mater. In 1752 he accepted a call as librarian to the prince Louis of Mecklenburg- Schwerin; in 1758, as professor ordinary of divinity to the University of Kiel; in 1766 he was honored with the degree of doctor of divinity. He died on 5 March 1774.

Gifted with a quick perception and a good memory, Mark acquired great learning, particularly in theology and philosophy. By his indefatigable diligence as an author he kept the press almost constantly busy. Of his works the following have special interest for us: Aleditationes de Sapientia sanctissima rite colenda (Kiel, 1762, 4to): — Primcelince juris divini evangelici (ibid. 1763, 4to): — Diss. de divina vocatione honinum miserorum ad fidem et salutem (ibid. 1767, 4to): — Causa Dei et sub ipso imuperlantium contra theologiam Jesuitarun (ibid. 1767, 4to). — Döring, Gelehrte Theol. Deutschlands, s.v.
