= Catherine Ivanovna of Russia =

Catherine Ivanovna
- Tsarevna of Russia
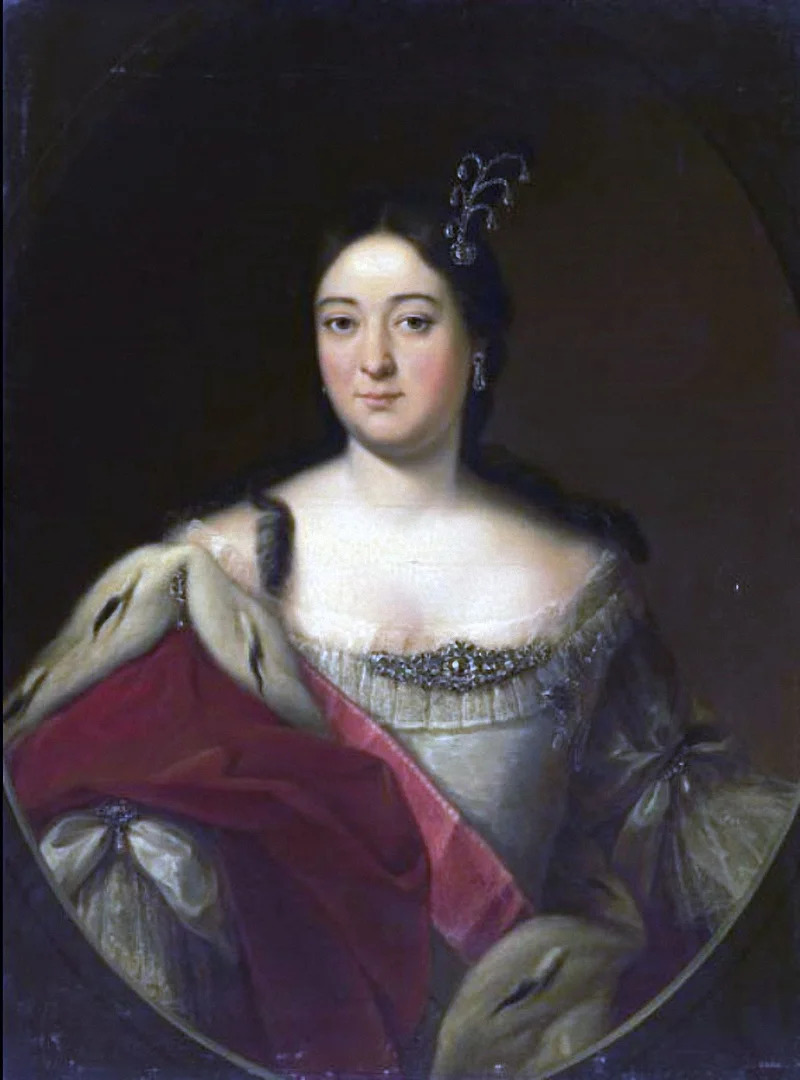
- Portrait, 1720s

Duchess consort of Mecklenburg-Schwerin
- Tenure: 19 April 1716 – 14 June 1733
- Born: 20 October 1691; Moscow, Russia
- Died: 14 June 1733 (aged 41); Saint Petersburg, Russia
- Burial: Annunciation Church of the Alexander Nevsky Lavra
- Spouse: Karl Leopold, Duke of Mecklenburg-Schwerin (m. 1716)
- Issue: Grand Duchess Anna Leopoldovna
Names
- Catherine Ivanovna Romanova
- House: Romanov
- Father: Ivan V of Russia
- Mother: Praskovia Saltykova

Tsarevna Catherine Ivanovna of Russia (Note: Also known as Catherine or Yekaterina Ioannovna; Russian: Екатерина Иоанновна.) (Russian: Екате́рина Ива́новна, romanized: Yekaterina Ivanovna; 20 October 1691 – 14 June 1733) was a daughter of Ivan V of Russia by his wife Praskovia Saltykova. She was the eldest sister of Anna and a niece of Peter I. By her marriage, she was a duchess of Mecklenburg-Schwerin.

== Early life ==
Catherine was born in Moscow and baptized at Chudov Monastery; her godparents were her uncle Tsar Peter I and her great-aunt Princess Tatiana (daughter of Tsar Michael I). She was the third of five daughters, but the early deaths of her older sisters Maria (on 23 February 1692, aged three) and Feodosia (on 22 May 1691, aged one) left her as the eldest child of her parents. Two more sisters were born later: Anna, the future Russian Empress, and Praskovia (14 October 1694 – 19 October 1731).

Catherine (reportedly the favorite child of her mother), spent her childhood in her mother's estate of Izmaylovo, also the birthplace of her paternal grandfather, Tsar Alexis. Like her younger sisters, she received an occidental education: the study of German and French languages, dancing and etiquette. Her teachers were Johann-Dietrich Christopher Osterman (brother of the future Vice-Chancellor) and Frenchman Etienne Rambur. Of Ivan V's daughters, she seems to have been the most capable. In 1708 the family moved to the new capital, Saint Petersburg.

== Marriage ==
According to contemporaries, Catherine was a short, dark-haired, and pale beauty and was a popular socialite with her charm and sociability.

At the request of her uncle Peter I, she was married on 19 April 1716 in Danzig to Karl Leopold, Duke of Mecklenburg-Schwerin. He had initially proposed to Catherine's sister Anna (then Dowager Duchess of Courland) but Peter I instead chose Catherine to be his bride. The marriage created a political alliance between Russia and Mecklenburg against Sweden, and was advantageous to Peter, as he wanted to use the port of Mecklenburg to harbour his fleet. According to the marriage contract, the Duke agreed to his future wife keeping her Orthodox faith, and to pay her 6,000 thalers per year. Peter I would, in return, contribute to the Duke's attempts to conquer the town of Wismar. They had two daughters: Elisabeth Catherine Christine (born in Rostock on 18 December 1718), and one unnamed (who was either stillborn or died immediately after birth on 18 January 1722).

The marriage was unhappy, as Karl Leopold abused Catherine. She returned to Russia in 1722 with her surviving daughter. The couple never divorced, but they never saw each other again.

== Later life in Russia ==
On the death of Peter II in 1730, the Supreme Privy Council considered Catherine as a candidate for the tsardom as the eldest daughter of Ivan V, but the fear that her spouse would gain influence in Russia and her own independent and capricious nature led to her widowed younger sister Anna, Duchess of Courland, being chosen instead, because she was considered more docile.

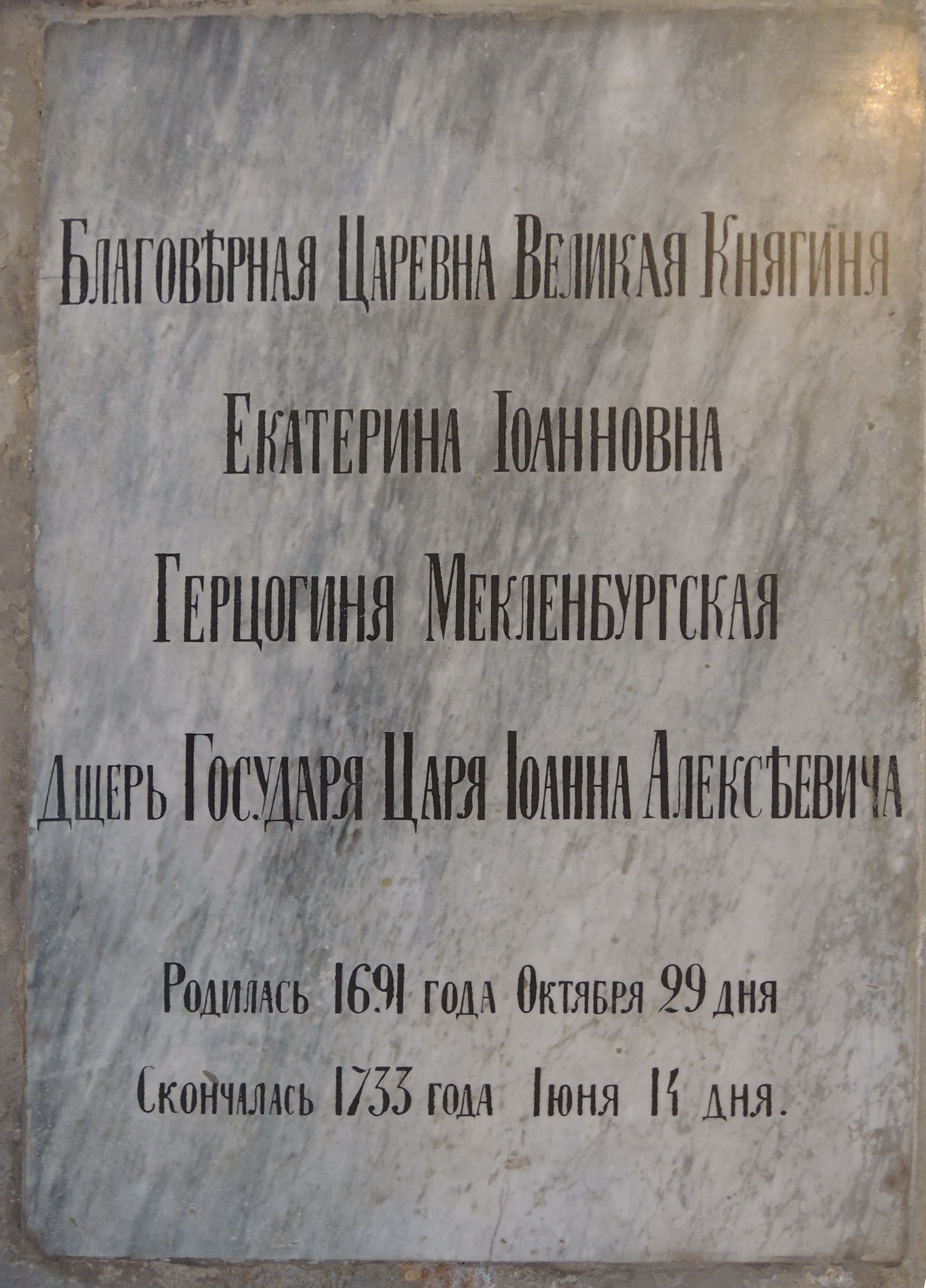
Catherine Ivanovna's Gravestone at Alexander Nevsky Lavra.

Catherine was involved in the events of 7 March 1730, when a group of nobles (between 150 and 800, according to sources), among whom were many officers of the Guards, arrived at the palace and gave a petition to the Empress. In this petition they requested the re-examination of the form of government that would be pleasing to all the people. Anna hesitated, but Catherine reportedly forced the Empress to sign the petition.

Catherine kept at her court one of the first Russian theaters, with serfs as actors. She secretly cohabited with the naval officer Prince Michail Andreevich Belosselsky-Belozersky who was exiled to the Urals three years after her death for engaging in "immodest talk" about the princess.

On 12 May 1733, Catherine was present at her daughter's conversion to the Orthodox religion, where she received the name Anna Leopoldovna, in order to make her acceptable as an heiress to the throne. Catherine died one month later and was buried next to her mother in the Annunciation Church of the Alexander Nevsky Lavra monastery.

== Sources ==
- "Екатерина Иоанновна" . Brockhaus and Efron Encyclopedic Dictionary (in Russian). 1906.

Catherine Ivanovna of Russia House of Romanov Born: 20 October 1691 Died: 14 June 1733
German royalty
Vacant Title last held by Sophie Charlotte of Hesse-Kassel	Duchess consort of Mecklenburg-Schwerin; 19 April 1716–1728	Succeeded by Duchess Gustave Caroline of Mecklenburg-Strelitz
