= Sophie Charlotte of Hesse-Kassel =

German princess (1678–1749)

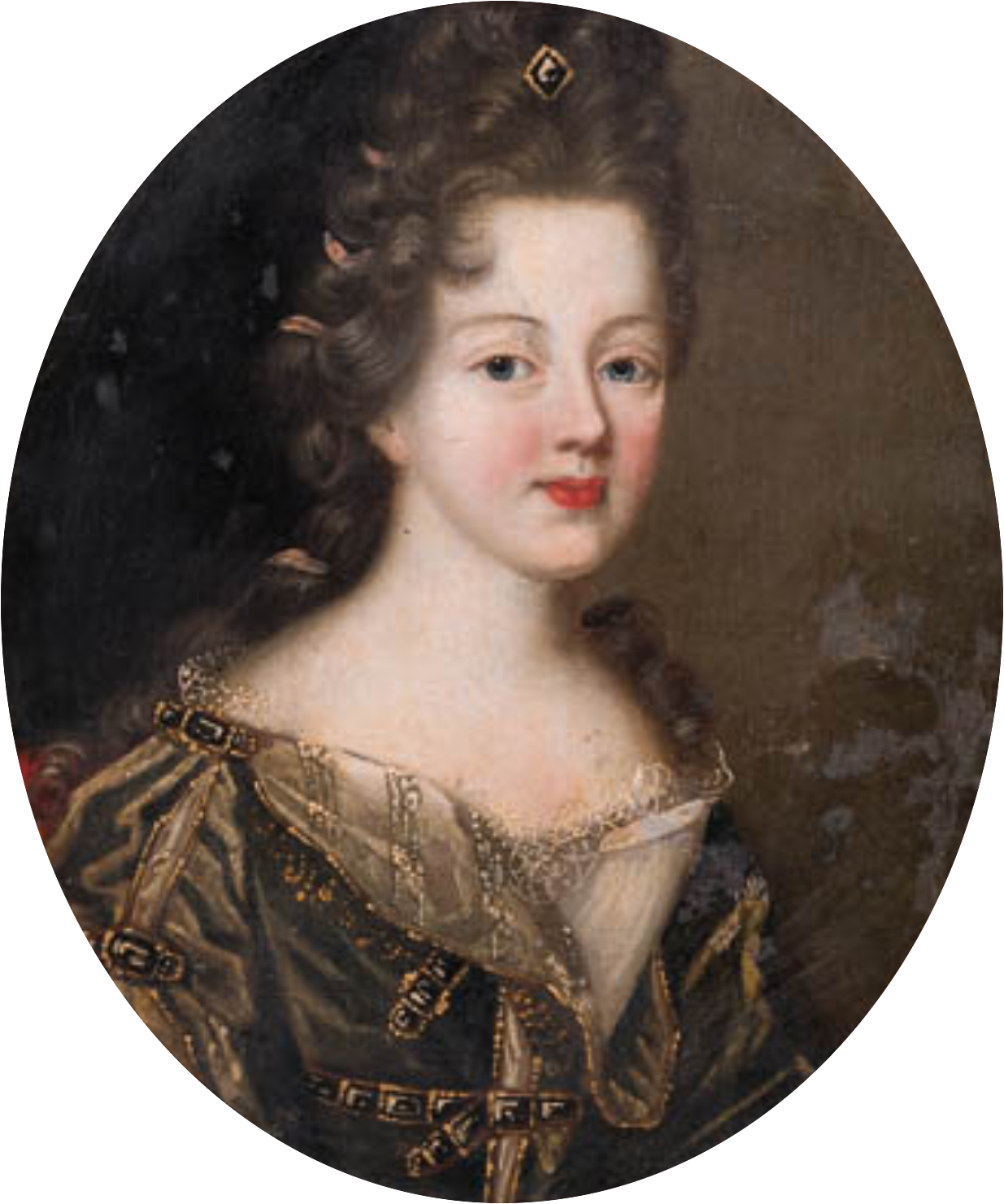
- Born: 16 July 1678; Kassel
- Died: 30 May 1749 (aged 70); Bützow
- Spouse: Frederick William, Duke of Mecklenburg-Schwerin
- Father: Charles I, Landgrave of Hesse-Kassel
- Mother: Maria Amalia of Courland

Sophie Charlotte of Hesse-Kassel (16 July 1678, Kassel – 30 May 1749, Bützow) was a princess of Hesse-Kassel and by marriage Duchess of Mecklenburg.

== Life ==
Sophie Charlotte was a daughter of Count Charles of Hesse-Kassel from his marriage to Maria Amalia of Courland, daughter of Duke Jacob Kettler of Kurland.

She married on 2 January 1704 in Kassel Duke Frederick William of Mecklenburg-Schwerin. They had no children. Frederick William probably suffered from a sexually transmitted disease.

After the death of the Duke in 1713, Sophie Charlotte lived at Bützow Castle. She was a member of the Reformed, and in the predominantly Lutheran Mecklenburg, she patron of the French Reformed Church. She founded the German Reformed Church in Bützow.

Sophie Charlotte also visited her brother, Frederick I of Sweden. She was present in Sweden during her brother's visit to Hesse in July–November 1731 to support his spouse Ulrica Eleonora of Sweden, who served as regent in his absence.
