= Christian Louis II =

Duke of Mecklenburg-Schwerin from 1747 to 1756

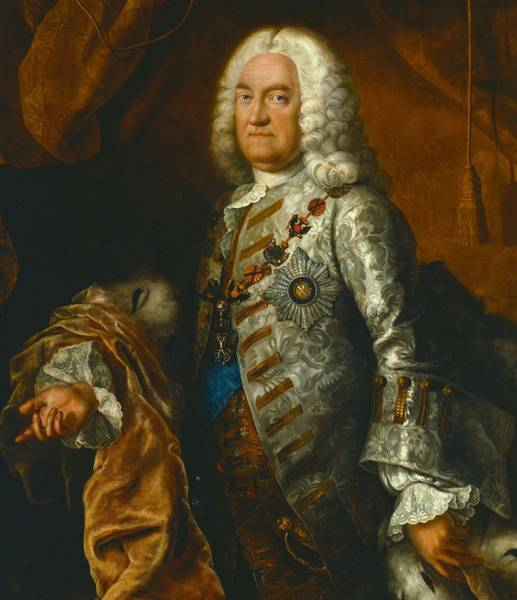

Duke of Mecklenburg-Schwerin
- Reign: 28 November 1747 - 30 May 1756
- Predecessor: Karl Leopold
- Successor: Frederick II
- Born: 15 May 1683; Grabow
- Died: 30 May 1756 (aged 73); Schwerin
- Burial: Schelf Church
- Spouse: Gustave Caroline of Mecklenburg-Strelitz (m. 1714; died 1748)
- Issue: Frederick II, Duke of Mecklenburg-Schwerin; Duchess Ulrike Sofie; Duke Louis; Duchess Luise; Duchess Amalie
- House: Mecklenburg
- Father: Frederick, Duke of Mecklenburg-Grabow
- Mother: Christine Wilhelmine of Hesse-Homburg

Christian Ludwig II (15 May 1683 – 30 May 1756) was the Duke of Mecklenburg-Schwerin from 1747 to 1756.

== Early life ==
Born into an ancient House of Mecklenburg, he was the third son of Frederick, Duke of Mecklenburg-Grabow, and his wife, Landgravine Christine Wilhelmine of Hesse-Homburg.

== Biography ==
Mecklenburg-Schwerin began its existence during a series of constitutional struggles between the duke and the nobles. The heavy debt incurred by Charles Leopold, who had joined Russian Empire in a war against Sweden, brought matters to a head; Charles VI interfered, and in 1728 the imperial court of justice declared the duke incapable of governing. His brother, Christian Ludwig II, was appointed administrator of the duchy. Under this prince, who became ruler de jure in 1747, the Convention of Rostock, by which a new constitution was framed for the duchy, was signed in April 1755. By this instrument, all power lay in the hands of the duke, the nobles, and the upper classes generally; the lower classes were entirely unrepresented. His household employed Johann Gottfried Müthel as an organist and cembalist, and Konrad Ekhof as a comedian.

== Personal life ==
In 1714, he married Duchess Gustave Caroline of Mecklenburg-Strelitz, daughter of Adolphus Frederick II, Duke of Mecklenburg-Strelitz and his wife, Duchess Marie of Mecklenburg-Güstrow (1659-1701). They had five children:

- Frederick II, Duke of Mecklenburg-Schwerin (1717–1785); married Duchess Louise Frederica of Württemberg (1722–1791)
- Ulrike Sofie (1723–1813) Abbess of the Rühn monastery
- Louis (1725–1778); married Charlotte Sophie of Saxe-Coburg-Saalfeld (1731–1810); they were the parents of Frederick Francis I, Grand Duke of Mecklenburg-Schwerin
- Luise (1730)
- Amalie (1732–1775) Canon of Herford

Mecklenburg-Schwerin coat of arms

Christian Louis II House of Mecklenburg Born: 15 May 1683 Died: 30 May 1756
Preceded by Karl Leopold	Duke of Mecklenburg-Schwerin; 1747–1756	Succeeded by Frederick II
