= Adolphus Frederick III =

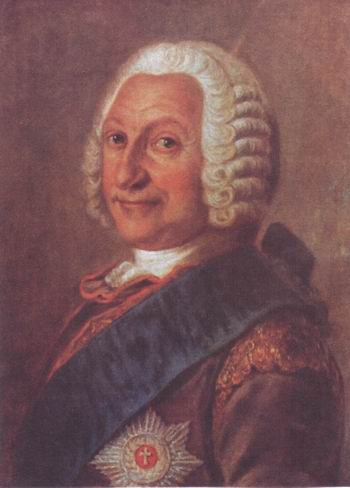

Duke of Mecklenburg-Strelitz
- Reign: 12 May 1708 - 11 December 1752
- Predecessor: Adolphus Frederick II
- Successor: Adolphus Frederick IV
- Born: 7 June 1686; Strelitz
- Died: 11 December 1752 (aged 66); Neustrelitz
- Spouse: Princess Dorothea of Schleswig-Holstein-Sonderburg-Plön (m. 1709)
- House: Mecklenburg-Strelitz
- Father: Adolphus Frederick II, Duke of Mecklenburg
- Mother: Marie of Mecklenburg-Güstrow

Adolphus Frederick III (German: Adolf Friedrich III; 7 June 1686 – 11 December 1752) was a Duke of Mecklenburg-Strelitz. He founded the town of Neustrelitz as the capital of Mecklenburg-Strelitz to replace the old capital which had burnt down.

== Biography ==
He was born in Strelitz the son of Adolphus Frederick II, Duke of Mecklenburg, and his wife Princess Maria of Mecklenburg-Güstrow (1659–1701). His father founded the Duchy of Mecklenburg-Strelitz in 1701 after reaching an agreement with Frederick William, Duke of Mecklenburg-Schwerin.

He succeeded his father as Duke of Mecklenburg-Strelitz on 12 May 1708. In 1712 the ducal family’s castle and the town of Strelitz burnt down. Because of this Adolphus Frederick and his family were forced to live in their hunting lodges. In 1726 Adolphus ordered a construction of a new residence, Glienecke, at Lake Zierke. The construction was finished in 1733. The town of Neustrelitz was founded around the new residence, and it became the official capital of Mecklenburg-Strelitz in 1736.

Adolphus Frederick died at Neustrelitz and was succeeded as Duke by his nephew Adolphus Frederick IV.

== Marriage and children ==
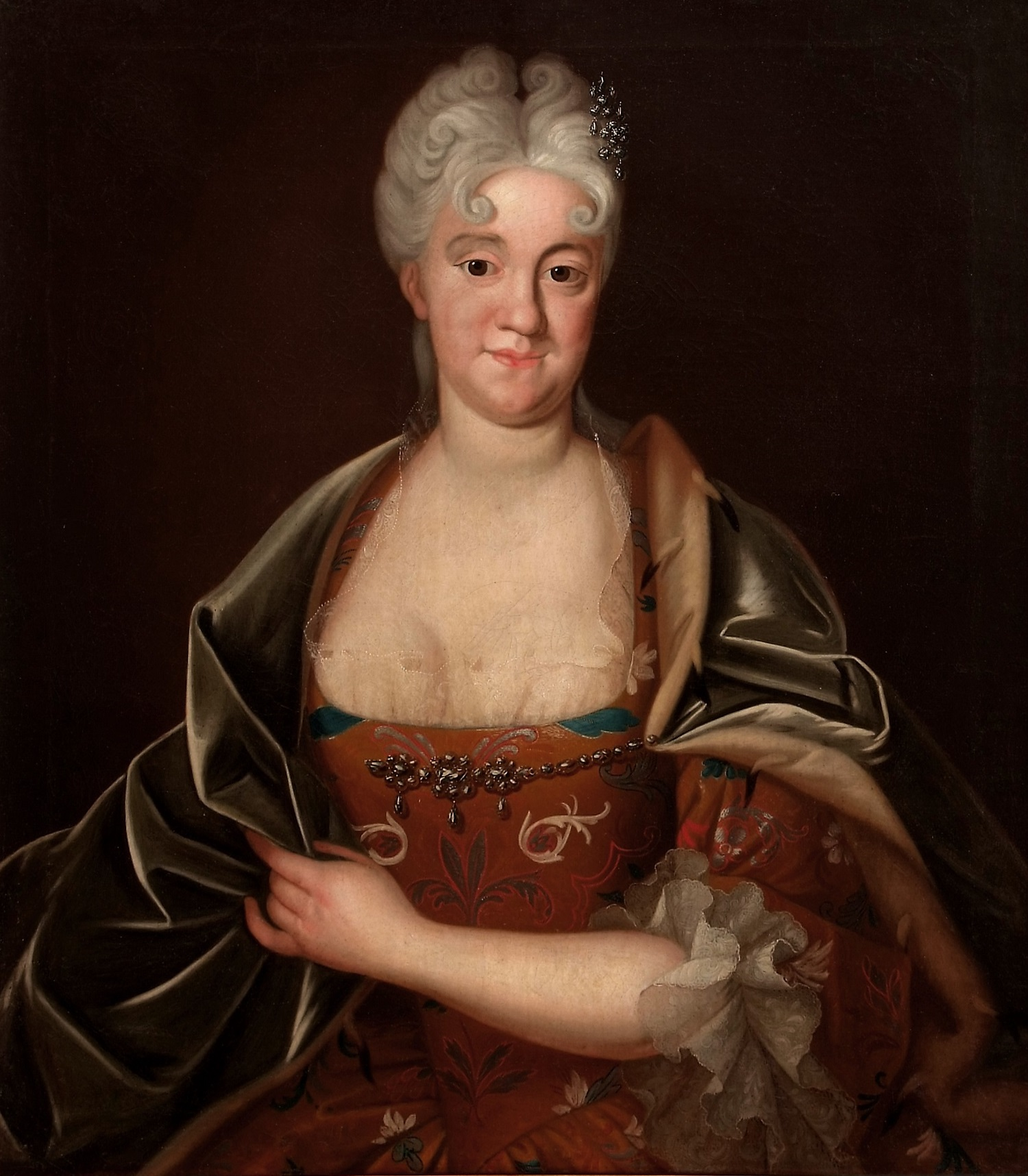
Dorothea of Schleswig-Holstein-Sonderburg-Plön, duchess of Mecklenburg-Strelitz

Adolphus Frederick was married to Princess Dorothea of Schleswig-Holstein-Sonderburg-Plön (daughter of John Adolphus, Duke of Schleswig-Holstein-Sonderburg-Plön) on 16 April 1709 at Reinfeld. They had two children:

- Duchess Marie Sofia (1710–1728)
- Duchess Madalena Cristina (1711–1713)

Adolphus Frederick III House of Mecklenburg-Strelitz Cadet branch of the House of Mecklenburg Born: 7 June 1686 Died: 11 December 1752
Regnal titles
Preceded by Adolf Frederick II	Duke of Mecklenburg-Strelitz; 1708–1752	Succeeded by Adolf Friedrich IV
