= Frederick, Duke of Mecklenburg-Grabow =

German noblemen (1638–1688)

- Born: 13 February 1638; Schwerin
- Died: 28 April 1688 (aged 50); Grabow
- Burial: Schelfkirche St. Nikolai in Schwerin
- Spouse: Christine Wilhelmine of Hesse-Homburg (m. 1671)
- Issue: Frederick William, Duke of Mecklenburg-Schwerin; Charles Leopold, Duke of Mecklenburg-Schwerin; Christian Ludwig II, Duke of Mecklenburg-Schwerin; Sophia Louise, Queen in Prussia
- House: Mecklenburg
- Father: Adolf Frederick I, Duke of Mecklenburg-Schwerin
- Mother: Marie Katharina of Brunswick-Dannenberg

Frederick I of Mecklenburg-Grabow (13 February 1638 – 28 April 1688) was the Duke of Mecklenburg-Grabow from 1665 until his death in 1688.

== Life ==
He was the son of Adolf Frederick I, Duke of Mecklenburg-Schwerin and his second wife Marie Katharina, daughter of Julius Ernst, Duke of Brunswick-Dannenberg. In 1667, Frederick became Domherr of Strasbourg Cathedral and from 1669, he lived in the family castle in Grabow. Three of his sons succeeded him, as Dukes of Mecklenburg-Schwerin. Frederick died in a fire in the castle and was buried on 3 June 1725, in the Schelfkirche St. Nikolai in Schwerin.

== Marriage and issue ==
On 28 May 1671 he married Christine Wilhelmine of Hesse-Homburg, daughter of William Christoph of Hesse-Homburg. They had the following children:

- Frederick William I (28 March 1675 – 31 July 1713); married Sophie Charlotte of Hesse-Kassel (16 July 1678 – 30 May 1749), daughter of Charles I, Landgrave of Hesse-Kassel, without issue.
- Carl Leopold (26 November 1678 – 28 November 1747); married Grand Duchess Ekaterina Ioanovna of Russia; with issue, including Grand Duchess Anna Leopoldovna of Russia, mother of Ivan VI of Russia.
- Christian Ludwig II (15 May 1683 – 30 May 1756); married his first cousin, Duchess Gustave Caroline of Mecklenburg-Strelitz, with issue.
- Sophie Louise (6 May 1685 – 29 July 1735); third wife of Frederick I of Prussia, without issue.
