= Karl Leopold, Duke of Mecklenburg-Schwerin =

Duke of Mecklenburg-Schwerin from 1713 to 1747

Karl Leopold
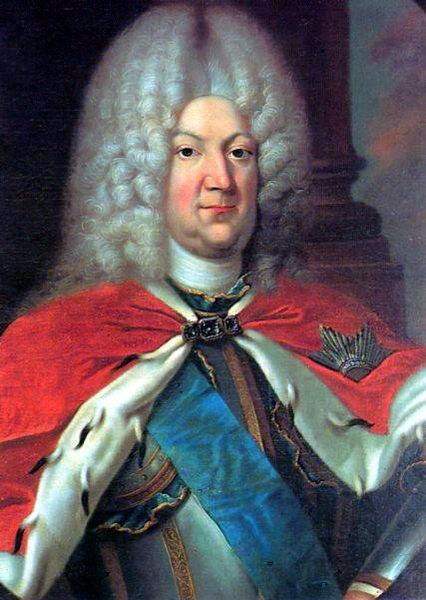

Duke of Mecklenburg-Schwerin
- Reign: 31 July 1713 – 28 November 1747
- Predecessor: Frederick William
- Successor: Christian Ludwig II
- Born: 26 November 1678
- Died: 28 November 1747 (aged 69)
- Spouse: Sophia Hedwig of Nassau-Dietz (m. 1709; div. 1710) Christine von Lepel (m. 1710; div. 1711) Tsarevna Catherine Ivanovna of Russia (m. 1716; died 1733)
- Issue: Grand Duchess Anna Leopoldovna of Russia
- House: Mecklenburg-Schwerin
- Father: Frederick, Duke of Mecklenburg-Grabow
- Mother: Christine Wilhelmine of Hesse-Homburg

Karl Leopold of Mecklenburg-Schwerin (26 November 1678 – 28 November 1747) was Duke of Mecklenburg-Schwerin from 1713 to 1747.

== Early life ==
He was the second son of Frederick, Duke of Mecklenburg-Grabow (1638–1688), and his wife, Landgravine Christine Wilhelmine of Hesse-Homburg (1653–1722). He succeeded his brother Frederick William, Duke of Mecklenburg-Schwerin, in 1713.

== Biography ==
Mecklenburg-Schwerin began its existence during a series of constitutional struggles between the duke and the nobles. The heavy debt incurred by Karl Leopold, who had joined Russian Empire in a war against Sweden, brought matters to a head; Charles VI interfered, and in 1728 the Imperial Aulic Council declared the duke incapable of governing. His brother, Christian Ludwig II, was appointed administrator of the duchy.

== Personal life ==
Karl Leopold married three times. His first wife was Princess Sophia Hedwig of Nassau-Dietz (1690–1734), daughter of Henry Casimir II, Prince of Nassau-Dietz, and his wife Henriëtte Amalia van Anhalt-Dessau. They married on 27 May 1709 in Leeuwarden and divorced in 1710. There were no children from this marriage.

His second wife was Christine von Lepel (1692–1728), daughter of Nicolaus Friedrich von Lepel (1633-1705) and his wife, Leveka von Plessen (1664-1732). They married on 7 June 1710 at Doberau and divorced on 2 October 1711. There were no children from this marriage, either.

His third wife was the Grand Duchess Catherine Ivanovna of Russia, daughter of Tsar Ivan V of Russia and his wife Praskovia Saltykova. They married on 19 April 1716 in Danzig. There was one daughter born of this marriage, the Grand Duchess Anna Leopoldovna of Russia. She married Duke Anthony Ulrich of Brunswick and had 5 children. She served as Regent of Russia for her son Ivan VI from 1740 to 1741.

== Sources ==
- Ludwig Fromm (1882). "Karl Leopold, Herzog von Mecklenburg-Schwerin" . Allgemeine Deutsche Biographie (in German). Vol. 15. Leipzig: Duncker & Humblot. pp. 308–310.
- Gerhard Heitz (1991) (in German). Herzog Carl Leopold von Mecklenburg-Schwerin. In Kaiser. König. Kardinal – Deutsche Fürsten 1500–1800, edited by Rolf Straubel and Ulman Weiss. Leipzig-Jena-Berlin: Urania-Verlag. ISBN 3-332-00386-0.
- Valentina Grijorian (1987) (in German). Zarenschicksale – Glanz und Skandale am Hofe der Zarendynastie Romanow/Holstein-Gottorp, 1st edition. Leipzig: LeiV Buchhandels- und Verlagsanstalt GmbH. ISBN 3-89603-988-1.
- Henry Vallotton (1978) (in German). Peter der Große – Russlands Aufstieg zur Großmacht, 2nd edition. Munich: Callwey Verlag. ISBN 3-7667-0430-3.

Preceded by Frederick William	Duke of Mecklenburg; 1713–1747	Succeeded by Christian Ludwig II
