= Frederick William, Duke of Mecklenburg-Schwerin =

Duke of Mecklenburg-Schwerin from 1692 to 1713

Frederick William
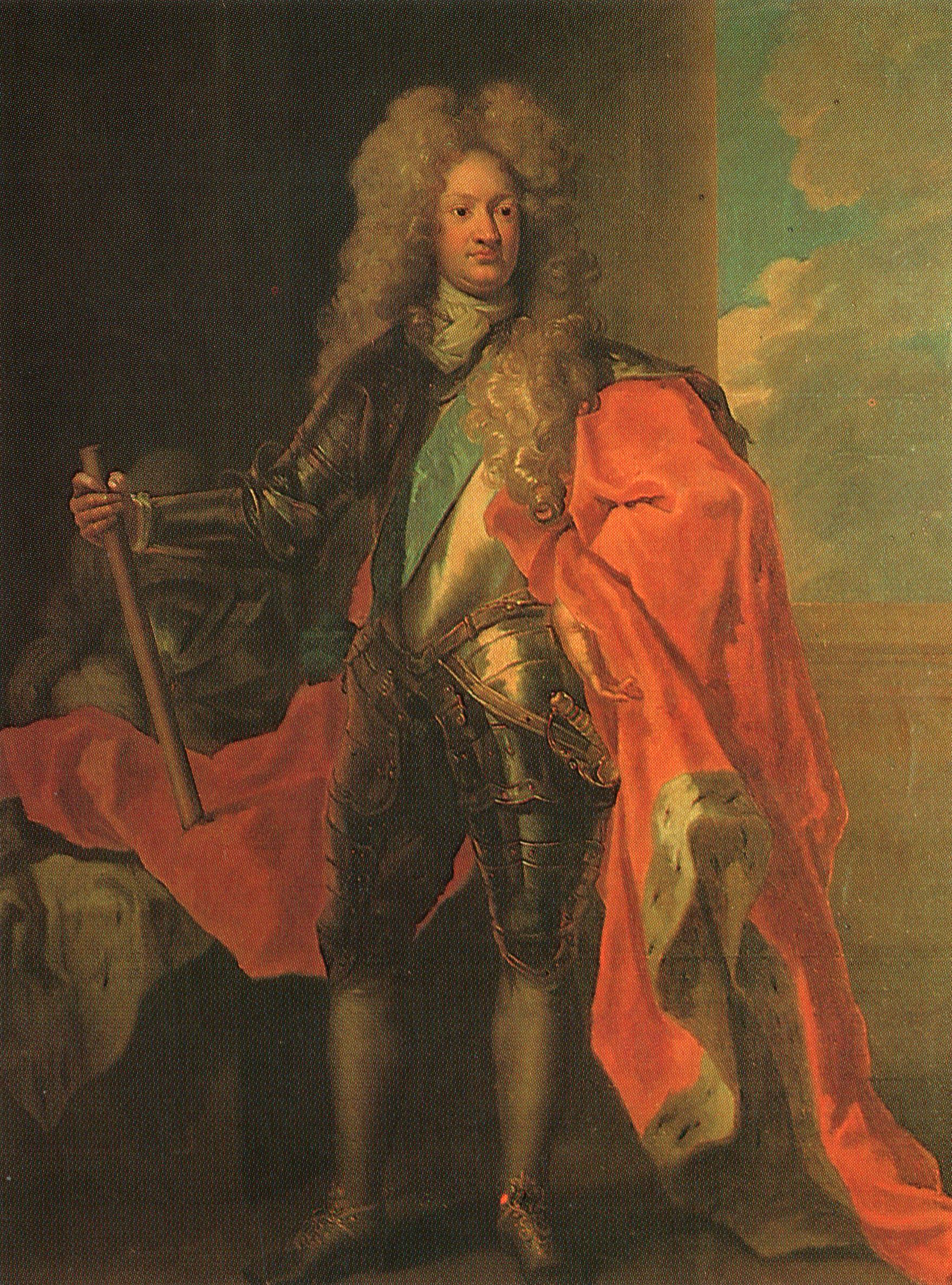
- Portrait of Frederick William, c. 1700–1713

Duke of Mecklenburg-Schwerin
- Reign: 21 June 1692 - 31 July 1713
- Predecessor: Christian Louis I
- Successor: Karl Leopold
- Born: 28 March 1675; Grabow
- Died: 31 July 1713 (aged 38); Mainz
- Spouse: Sophie Charlotte of Hesse-Kassel (m. 1704)
- House: Mecklenburg-Schwerin
- Father: Frederick, Duke of Mecklenburg-Grabow
- Mother: Christine Wilhelmine of Hesse-Homburg

Frederick William (28 March 1675 – 31 July 1713) was the reigning duke of Mecklenburg in the Mecklenburg-Schwerin portion of the duchy of Mecklenburg from 1692 until 1713.

Frederick William was the eldest son of Prince Frederick, Duke of Mecklenburg-Grabow, and Christine Wilhelmine of Hesse-Homburg (1653–1722). He was a nephew of the childless Duke Christian Ludwig I of Mecklenburg. Frederick William succeeded his uncle on 21 June 1692 as regent of the Schwerin portion of the duchy of Mecklenburg. After the extinction of the Mecklenburg-Güstrow line of the dynasty with the death of Duke Gustav Adolph in 1695, Frederick William became embroiled in a violent succession dispute with his uncle Adolf Frederick II that escalated quickly. It brought the country to the brink of civil war and was settled only through the intervention of foreign powers. The king of Denmark and Norway, Frederick IV, gave up the inheritance request for the Mecklenburg-Güstrow principality in exchange for the Duke's support for Denmark-Norway in the Great Northern War. The dispute was ended in 1701 by the Hamburg Compromise. Mecklenburg was again split into two parts with limited autonomy. The two sub-principalities, Mecklenburg-Strelitz and Mecklenburg-Schwerin, existed until 1918. The Compromise also introduced the right of succession of the first-born to the dynasty.

In 1708, Frederick William introduced the "Consumption and Tax Statute" to overcome the fiscal consequences of the Thirty Years' War and the Great Northern War. In addition to the taxation of knights and the clergy, this law included the abolition of serfdom, freeing farmers from dependence on their landlords. The former peasants could lease their land and forced labor was to be replaced by work for a salary. This created a sharp conflict between the duke and the landed estates.

Frederick William married Sophie Charlotte of Hesse-Kassel on 2 January 1704 in Kassel. She was a daughter of Count Charles I of Hesse-Kassel. The couple had no children.

Frederick William had numerous mistresses, with whom he had at least nine children, including:

- Charles Louis von Mecklenburg auf Zibühl, Lübzin and Karcheez (a son with Sophie Magdalene of Plüskow, died 1703)
- Margaretha Dorothea Gredler (died 1744 in Dömitz)

A lady named Frederika Wilhelmina was born in 1702 in Boitzenburg and died 1748 in Schwerin. In 1719, she married Hermann Christian von Wolffradt (died in 1723 in Dömitz). She was a mistress of Duke Karl Leopold of Mecklenburg. Whether she was an illegitimate daughter of Frederick William is a point of controversy in the historical literature.

Frederick William died in Mainz on 31 July 1713 on his return from Schlangenbad. His wife Sofia Charlotte took up her dower in Bützow, where she died. She was buried beside her husband in the crypt of the newly built Schelfkirche St. Nikolai in Schwerin.

Frederick William, Duke of Mecklenburg-Schwerin House of Mecklenburg Born: 28 March 1675 Died: 31 July 1713
Preceded by Christian Louis I	Duke of Mecklenburg-Schwerin; 1692–1713	Succeeded by Karl Leopold
