= Schelf Church =

Church in Schwerin, Germany

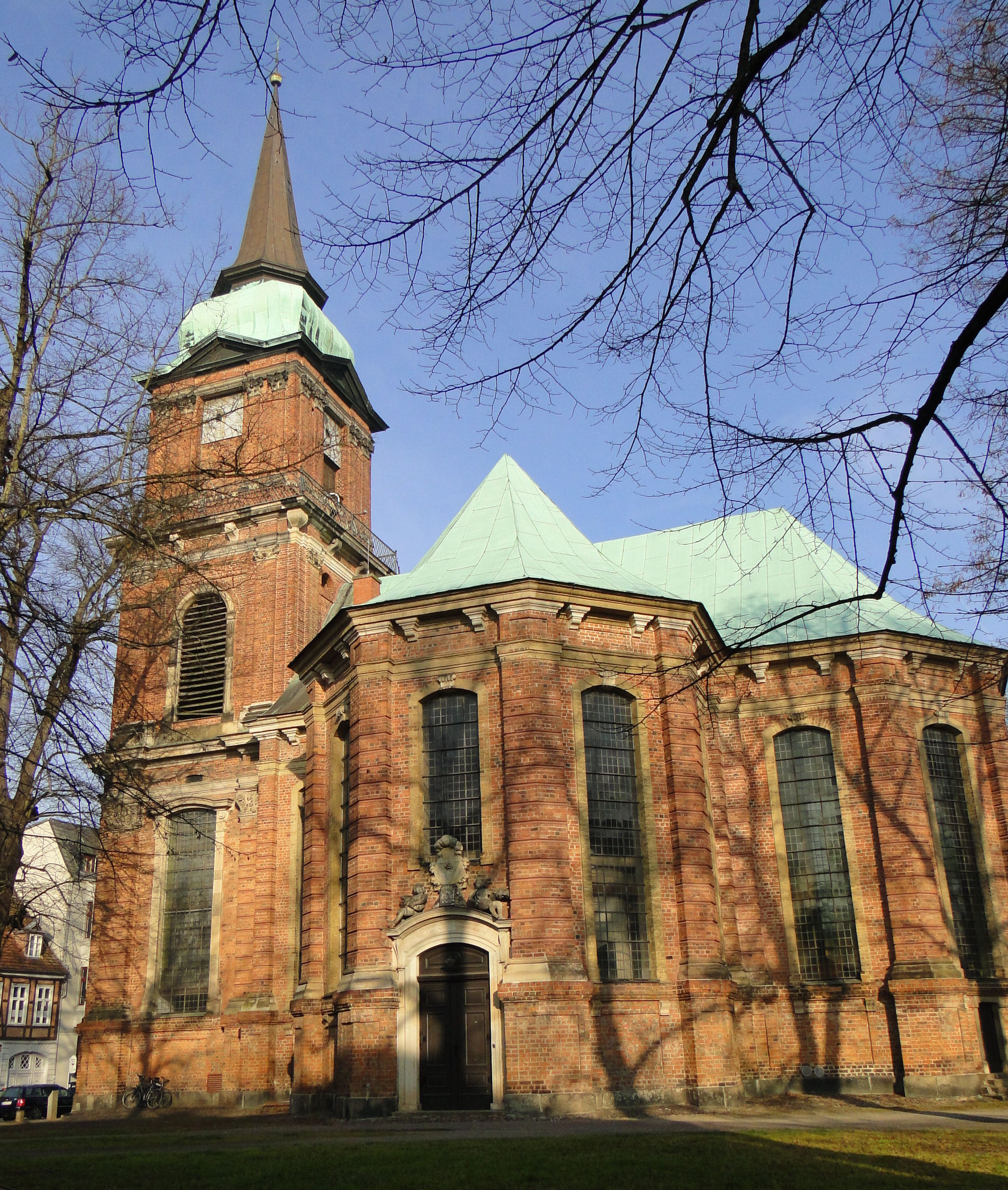
- The Schelf Church of St. Nicholas

- Location within Mecklenburg-Vorpommern Location within Germany

Religion
- Affiliation: Lutheranism
- Status: Active

Location
- Interactive map of Schelf Church
- Coordinates: 53°37′57″N 11°25′4″E

Architecture
- Completed: 1238

The Schelf Church of St. Nicholas (German: Schelfkirche St. Nikolai) is an Evangelical Lutheran church dedicated to Saint Nicholas in the Schelfstadt quarter of Schwerin in Germany. The church is owned and used by a congregation within the Evangelical Lutheran Church in Northern Germany. It was originally built in 1238, but was rebuilt in 1713 in the Baroque style after destruction by a storm. It is the family burial place of the House of Mecklenburg-Schwerin, including Sophia Louise of Mecklenburg-Schwerin.

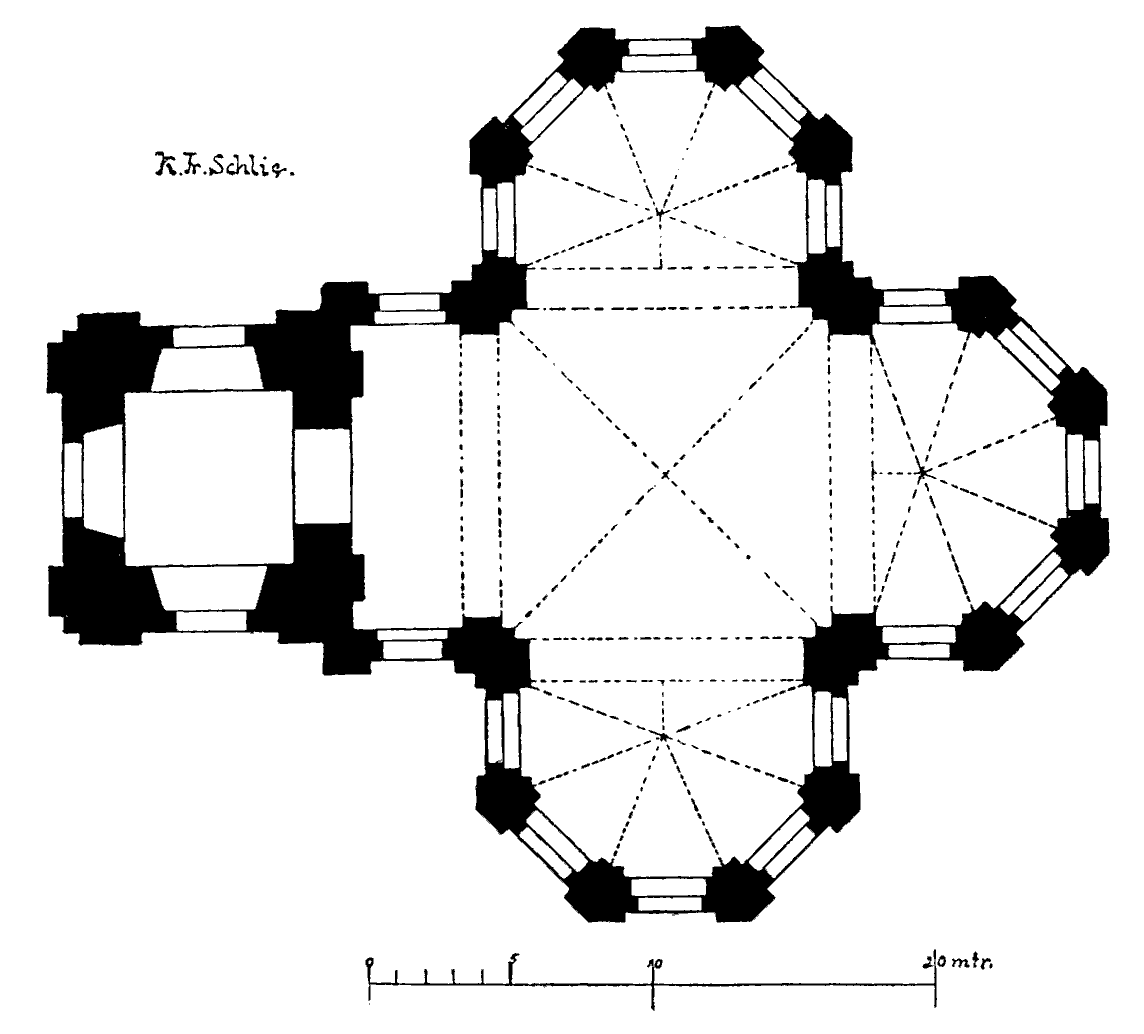
Plan by Schlie

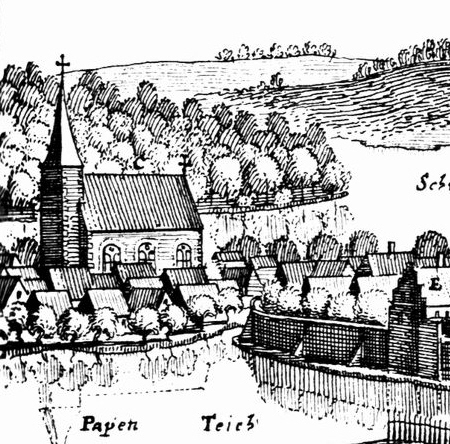
Schelfe and the medieval Schelf Church before 1651

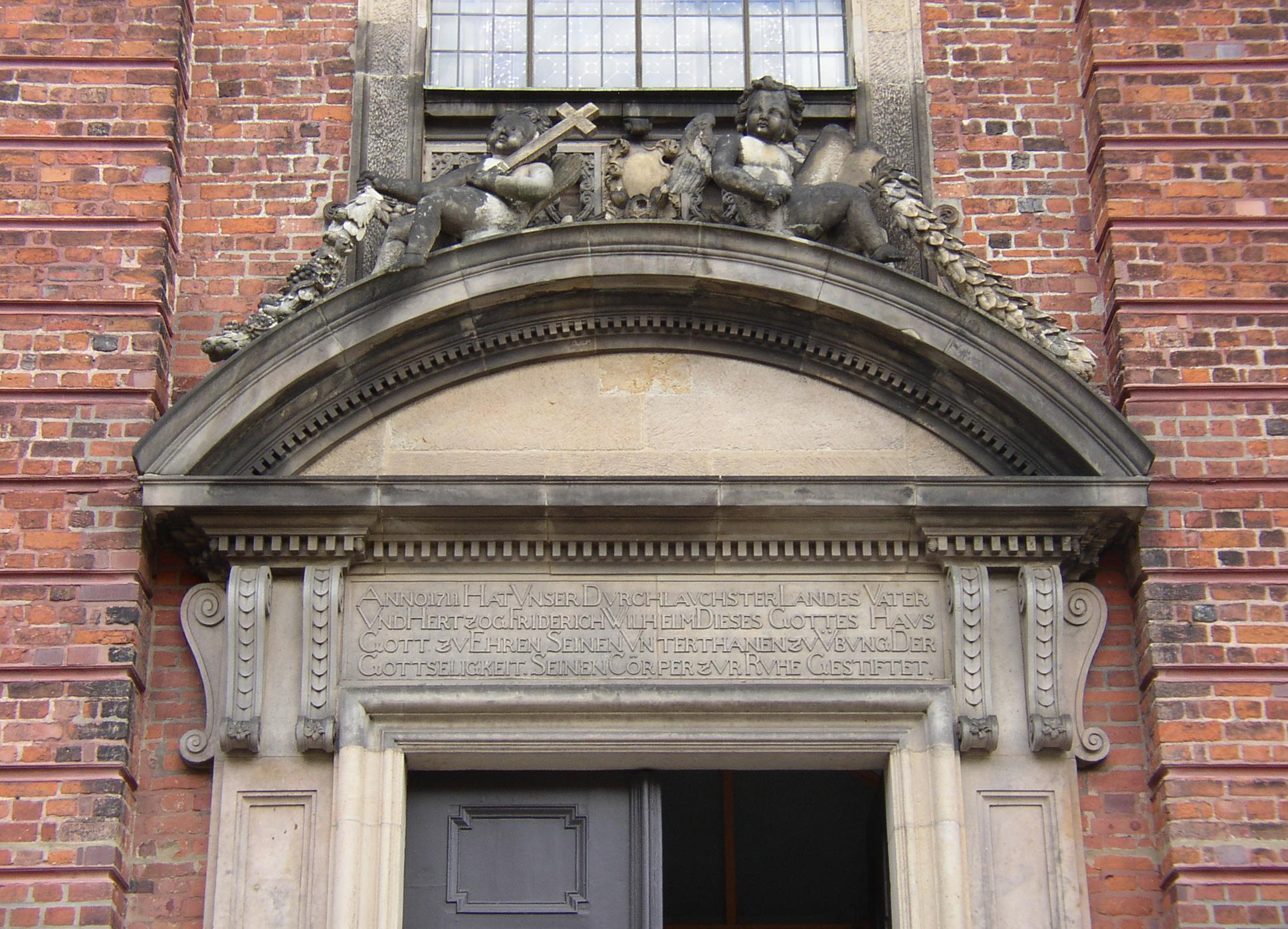
Inscription

== Bibliography ==
- Leonhard Christoph Sturm: Architectonisches Bedencken Von Protestantischer Kleinen Kirchen Figur und Einrichtung/ An Eine Durchläuchtige Person über einem gewissen Casu gestellet/ Und Als eine offtmahls vorkommende Sache zum gemeinen Nutzen im Druck gegeben/ Mit dazu gehörigen Rissen. Hamburg: Schiller 1712
- Edgar Jakobs: Etwas von der Schelfkirche. In: Monatshefte für Mecklenburg. Schwerin, Bd. 14 (1938), 165, S. 397-398 (Digitalisat)
