= Adolphus Frederick II =

- Duke of Mecklenburg-Strelitz
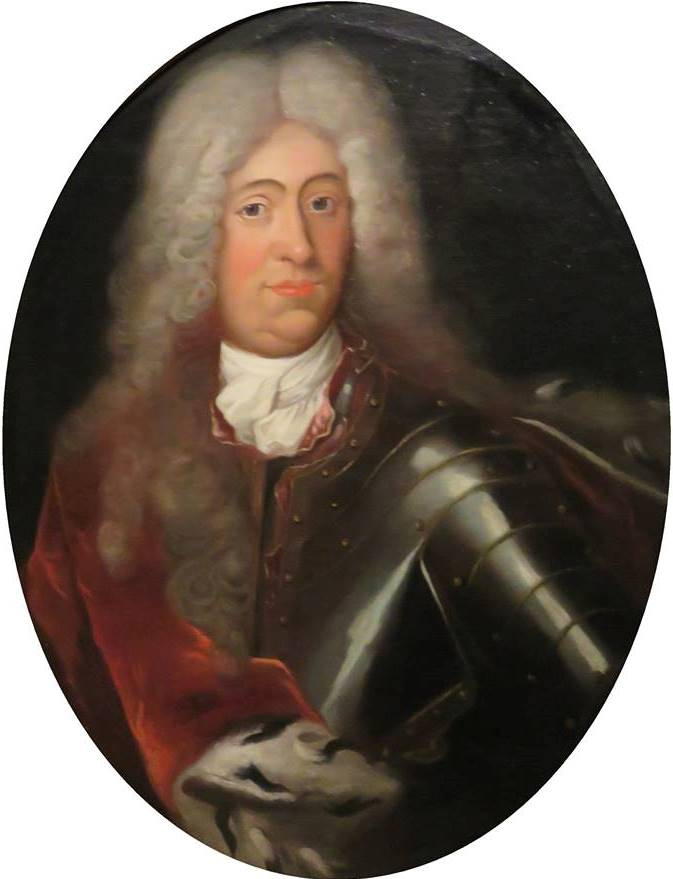

Duke of Mecklenburg-Strelitz
- Reign: 8 March 1701 – 12 May 1708
- Predecessor: Friedrich Wilhelm
- Successor: Adolf Friedrich III
- Born: 19 October 1658; Grabow
- Died: 12 May 1708 (aged 49)
- Spouse: Princess Maria of Mecklenburg-Güstrow (m. 1684; died 1701) Princess Johanna of Saxe-Gotha (m. 1702; died 1704) Princess Christiane Emilie of Schwarzburg-Sondershausen (m. 1705)
- Issue Detail: Adolphus Frederick III, Duke of Mecklenburg-Strelitz; Duchess Magdalena Amalia; Duchess Maria; Duchess Eleonore Wilhelmina; Gustave Caroline, Duchess of Mecklenburg; Duchess Sophia Christina Louise; Duke Charles Louis Frederick
- House: Mecklenburg-Strelitz
- Father: Adolf Frederick I
- Mother: Maria Katharina of Brunswick-Dannenberg
- Religion: Lutheranism

Adolphus Frederick II (German: Adolf Friedrich II; 19 October 1658 – 12 May 1708), Duke of Mecklenburg, was the first Duke of the Mecklenburg-Strelitz, reigning from 1701 until his death. Mecklenburg-Strelitz was a part of the Holy Roman Empire.

== Biography ==
He was born in Grabow as the posthumous son of Duke Adolf Frederick I of Mecklenburg and his second wife, Maria Katharina of Brunswick-Dannenberg (1616–1665).

In 1695, the Mecklenburg-Güstrow branch of the House of Mecklenburg became extinct and Adolphus Frederick's nephew, Frederick William, Duke of Mecklenburg-Schwerin, laid claim to the inheritance, a move which Adolphus Frederick opposed.

The dispute was settled in 1701 by dividing Mecklenburg-Güstrow between the two claimants. Frederick William took the Duchy of Mecklenburg-Schwerin, and Adolphus obtained the Principality of Ratzeburg and the Lordship of Stargard with the commanderies of Mirow and Nemerow, of which he formed the Duchy of Mecklenburg-Strelitz.

Following his death in 1708, Adolphus Frederick was succeeded as Duke by his son, Adolphus Frederick III.

== Marriages and children ==
In 1684, Adolphus Frederick II married firstly to Marie of Mecklenburg-Güstrow (19 July 1659 – 16 January 1701), daughter of Gustav Adolph, Duke of Mecklenburg-Güstrow. They had five children:

- Adolphus Frederick III, Duke of Mecklenburg-Strelitz (Strelitz, 7 June 1686 – Schwerin, 11 December 1752).
- Duchess Magdalena Amalia of Mecklenburg-Strelitz (Strelitz, 25 April 1689 – Strelitz, 28 April 1689).
- Duchess Maria of Mecklenburg-Strelitz (born and died Strelitz, 7 August 1690).
- Duchess Eleonore Wilhelmina of Mecklenburg-Strelitz (Strelitz, 8 July 1691 – Strelitz, 9 July 1691).
- Duchess Gustave Caroline of Mecklenburg-Strelitz (Strelitz, 12 July 1694 – Schwerin, 13 April 1748) she married Christian Ludwig II, Duke of Mecklenburg.

On 20 June 1702, Adolphus Frederick II married secondly to Princess Johanna of Saxe-Gotha (1 October 1680 – 9 July 1704), daughter of Frederick I, Duke of Saxe-Gotha-Altenburg, and Magdalena Sybille of Saxe-Weissenfels, who was his half-niece. There were no children from this marriage.

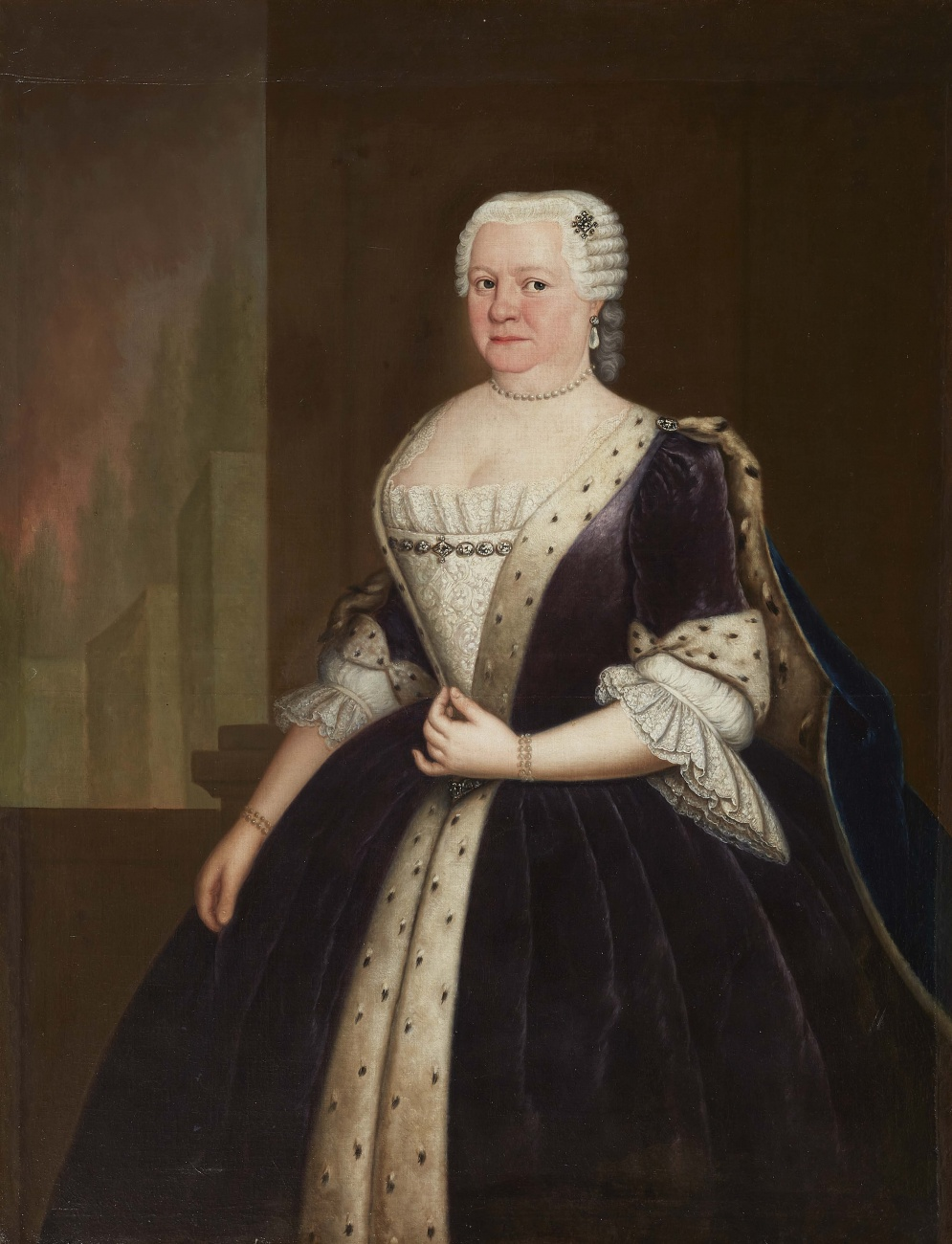
Adolphus Frederick's third wife, Princess Christiane Emilie of Schwarzburg-Sondershausen

On 10 June 1705 at Neustrelitz, Adolphus Frederick II married thirdly to Princess Christiane Emilie of Schwarzburg-Sondershausen (13 March 1681 – 1 November 1751), daughter of Christian William I, Prince of Schwarzburg-Sondershausen, and Countess Antonie Sybille of Barby-Mühlingen (1641–1684). They had two children:

- Duchess Sophia Christina Louise of Mecklenburg-Strelitz (Strelitz, 12 October 1706 – Strelitz, 22 December 1708).
- Duke Charles I Louis Frederick of Mecklenburg-Strelitz (Strelitz, 23 February 1708 – Mirow, 5 June 1752), Prince of Mirow.

Through his granddaughter Charlotte, Adolphus Frederick is the ancestor of every British monarch beginning with George IV, who ascended the throne of the United Kingdom in 1820.

Adolphus Frederick II House of Mecklenburg-Strelitz Cadet branch of the House of Mecklenburg Born: 19 October 1658 Died: 12 May 1708
Regnal titles
New title	Duke of Mecklenburg-Strelitz; 1701–1708	Succeeded by Adolphus Frederick III
