= Duchy of Mecklenburg-Schwerin =

German state (1379–1815)

Duchy of Mecklenburg-Schwerin Herzogtum Mecklenburg-Schwerin (German)
- 1701–1815
- Flag (1813–1815) Coat of arms

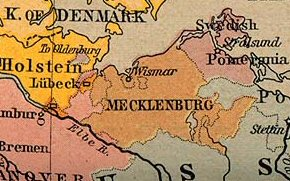
- Mecklenburg c. 1803 (brown), with Mecklenburg-Schwerin being the larger central territory
- Status: State of the Holy Roman Empire; State of the Confederation of the Rhine
- Capital: Schwerin
- Common languages: Low German, Polabian
- Religion: Evangelical Lutheran State Church of Mecklenburg-Schwerin
- Government: Monarchy
- Duke of Mecklenburg-Schwerin
  - 1701–1713: Frederick William
  - 1713–1728: Karl Leopold
  - 1728–1756: Christian Ludwig II
  - 1756–1785: Frederick II
  - 1785–1815: Frederick Francis I
- History
  - Treaty of Hamburg: 1701
  - Raised to Grand Duchy: 1815
- Currency: Mecklenburg thaler
Preceded by	Succeeded by
Duchy of Mecklenburg	Grand Duchy of Mecklenburg-Schwerin
- Today part of: Germany

The Duchy of Mecklenburg-Schwerin (German: Herzogtum Mecklenburg-Schwerin) was a duchy in northern Germany created in 1701, when Frederick William and Adolphus Frederick II divided the Duchy of Mecklenburg between Schwerin and Strelitz. Ruled by the successors of the Nikloting House of Mecklenburg, Mecklenburg-Schwerin remained a state of the Holy Roman Empire along the Baltic Sea littoral between Holstein-Glückstadt and the Duchy of Pomerania.

== Origins ==
The dynasty's progenitor, Niklot (1090–1160), was a chief of the Slavic Obotrite tribal federation, who fought against the advancing Saxons and was finally defeated in 1160 by Henry the Lion in the course of the Wendish Crusade. Niklot's son, Pribislav, submitted to Henry, and in 1167 came into his paternal inheritance as the first Prince of Mecklenburg.

After various divisions of territory among Pribislav's descendants, Henry II of Mecklenburg (1266–1329) by 1312 had acquired the lordships of Stargard and Rostock, and bequeathed the reunified Mecklenburg lands – except for the County of Schwerin and Werle – to his sons, Albert II and John. After they both had received the title of duke, the former lordship of Stargard was recast as the Duchy of Mecklenburg-Stargard for John in 1352. Albert II retained the larger western part of Mecklenburg, and after he acquired the former County of Schwerin in 1358, he made Schwerin his residence.

In 1363 Albert's son, Duke Albert III, campaigned in Sweden, where he was crowned king one year later. In 1436, William, the last Lord of Werle, died without a male heir. Because William's son-in-law, Ulric II of Mecklenburg-Stargard, had no issue, his line became extinct upon Ulric's death in 1471. All possessions fell back to Duke Henry IV of Mecklenburg-Schwerin, who was then the sole ruler over all of Mecklenburg.

In 1520 Henry's grandsons, Henry V and Albert VII, again divided the duchy, creating the subdivision of Mecklenburg-Güstrow, which Duke Adolf Frederick I of Mecklenburg-Schwerin inherited in 1610. In a second partition of 1621, he granted Güstrow to his brother, John Albert II. Both were deposed in 1628 by Albrecht von Wallenstein, as they had supported Christian IV of Denmark in the Thirty Years' War. Nevertheless, the Swedish Empire forced their restoration three years later. When John Albert II's son, Duke Gustav Adolph, died without male heirs in 1695, Mecklenburg was reunited once more under Frederick William, Duke of Mecklenburg-Schwerin.

== History ==
In June 1692, when Christian Louis I died in exile and without sons, a dispute arose about the succession to his duchy between his brother, Adolphus Frederick II, and his nephew, Frederick William. The emperor and the rulers of Sweden and of the Electorate of Brandenburg took part in this struggle, which was intensified three years later, when on the death of Gustav Adolph, the family ruling over Mecklenburg-Güstrow became extinct. In 1701, with the endorsement of the Imperial state of the Lower Saxon Circle, the Treaty of Hamburg (1701) was signed and the final division of the country was made. Mecklenburg was divided between the two claimants. The Duchy of Mecklenburg-Schwerin was given to Frederick William, and the Duchy of Mecklenburg-Strelitz, roughly a recreation of the medieval Stargard lordship, to Adolphus Frederick II. At the same time, the principle of primogeniture was reasserted, and the right of summoning the joint Landtag was reserved to the ruler of Mecklenburg-Schwerin. Continued conflicts and partitions weakened the rule of the dukes and affirmed the reputation of Mecklenburg as one of the most backward territories of the Empire.

Mecklenburg-Schwerin began its existence during a series of constitutional struggles between the duke and the nobles. The heavy debt incurred by Charles Leopold, who had joined the Russian Empire in a war against Sweden, brought matters to a head; Charles VI interfered, and in 1728 the imperial court of justice declared the duke incapable of governing. His brother, Christian Ludwig II, was appointed administrator of the duchy. Under this prince, who became ruler de jure in 1747, the Convention of Rostock, by which a new constitution was framed for the duchy, was signed in April 1755. By this instrument, all power lay in the hands of the duke, the nobles, and the upper classes generally; the lower classes were entirely unrepresented. During the Seven Years' War, Frederick II took a hostile attitude towards Frederick the Great, and in consequence Mecklenburg-Schwerin was occupied by Prussia. In other respects, Frederick II's rule proved beneficial to the country. In the early years of the French Revolutionary Wars, Frederick Francis I, Grand Duke of Mecklenburg-Schwerin remained neutral, and in 1803 he regained Wismar from the Kingdom of Sweden. In 1806 the territory was overrun by the First French Empire, and in 1808 Frederick Francis I joined the Confederation of the Rhine. He was later the first member of the confederation to abandon Napoleon, to whose armies he had sent a contingent, and in 1813–1814 he fought against France.

== Aftermath ==
With the Congress of Vienna in 1815, Frederick Francis I of Mecklenburg-Schwerin received the title of Grand Duke. After the fall of the monarchies in 1918 resulting from World War I, the Grand Duchy became the Free State of Mecklenburg-Schwerin. On 1 January 1934 it was united with the neighbouring Free State of Mecklenburg-Strelitz (both today part of Germany's Bundesland Mecklenburg-Vorpommern).

== List of dukes of Mecklenburg-Schwerin (1701-1815) ==
- 1692-1713 Frederick William
- 1713-1728 Charles Leopold, his brother
- 1728-1756 Christian Louis II, his brother
- 1756-1785 Frederick II, his son
- 1785-1815 Frederick Francis I, his nephew, became Grand Duke of Mecklenburg-Schwerin as a result of the Congress of Vienna, until 1837
