= Adolphus Frederick I =

Duke of Mecklenburg-Schwerin from 1592 to 1658

Adolf Frederick I
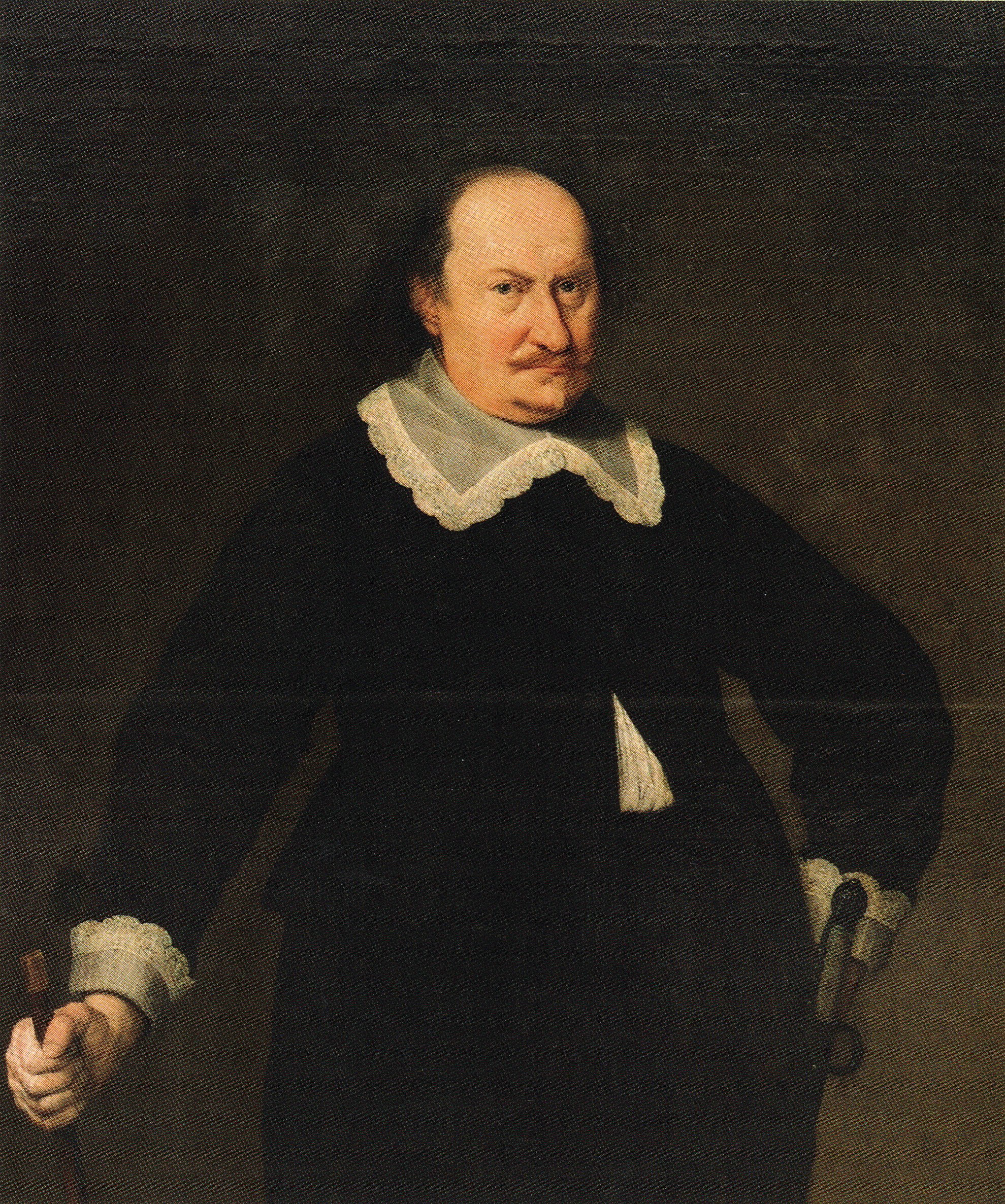
- Portrait by Daniel Blok

Duke of Mecklenburg-Schwerin
- Reign: 22 March 1592 - 27 February 1658 (Deposed by Wallenstein 1628-1631)
- Predecessor: John VII
- Successor: Christian Louis I
- Born: 15 December 1588; Schwerin, Duchy of Mecklenburg-Schwerin, Holy Roman Empire
- Died: 27 February 1658 (aged 69); Schwerin, Duchy of Mecklenburg-Schwerin, Holy Roman Empire
- Spouse: Anna Maria of Ostfriesland (m. 1622; died 1634) Marie Katharina of Brunswick-Dannenberg (m. 1635)
- Issue Detail: Christian Louis I, Duke of Mecklenburg-Schwerin; Sophie Agnes, Abbess of Rühn; Charles, Duke of Mecklenburg-Mirow; Anna Maria, Duchess of Saxe-Weissenfels; John George, Duke of Mecklenburg-Mirow; Prince Gustav Rudolph; Juliane Sibylla, Abbess of Rühn; Frederick, Duke of Mecklenburg-Grabow; Christina, Abbess of Gandersheim; Marie Elisabeth, Abbess of Gandersheim; Anna Sophia, Duchess of Württemberg-Juliusburg; Adolf Frederick II, Duke of Mecklenburg-Strelitz
- House: Mecklenburg
- Father: John VII, Duke of Mecklenburg-Schwerin
- Mother: Sophia of Holstein-Gottorp

Adolf Frederick I (German: Adolf Friedrich I; 15 December 1588 – 27 February 1658) was the reigning Duke of Mecklenburg-Schwerin from his father's death in 1592 until 1628 and again from 1631 to 1658. Between 1634 and 1648, he also ruled the Prince-Bishopric of Schwerin as its administrator.

== Early life ==
He was a son of John VII, Duke of Mecklenburg-Schwerin and Sophia, daughter of Adolf, Duke of Holstein-Gottorp, and his wife Christine of Hesse.

At first, Adolf Frederick and his brother John Albert II reigned under the guardianship of Duke Ulrich III of Mecklenburg-Güstrow and Charles I of Mecklenburg (their father's uncles).

The two brothers Adolf Frederick and John Albert, took over governance of Mecklenburg-Schwerin beginning on 16 April 1608. After the death of Charles on 22 July 1610 they also governed in Mecklenburg-Güstrow.

== Division of Mecklenburg and Thirty Years' War ==
In 1621 the duchy of Mecklenburg was formally divided between the two brothers, Adolf Frederick ruling in Mecklenburg-Schwerin and John Albert ruling in Mecklenburg-Güstrow.

During the Thirty Years' War, Albrecht von Wallenstein ousted the dukes after they secretly sided with King Christian IV of Denmark against Holy Roman Emperor Ferdinand II. Wallenstein ruled the duchies from 1627 until 1631, when the Swedes restored the under King Gustavus Adolphus. In 1634 Adolf Frederick succeeded Ulrik of Denmark as the last Administrator of the Prince-Bishopric of Schwerin before its secularisation.

== Marriages and children ==
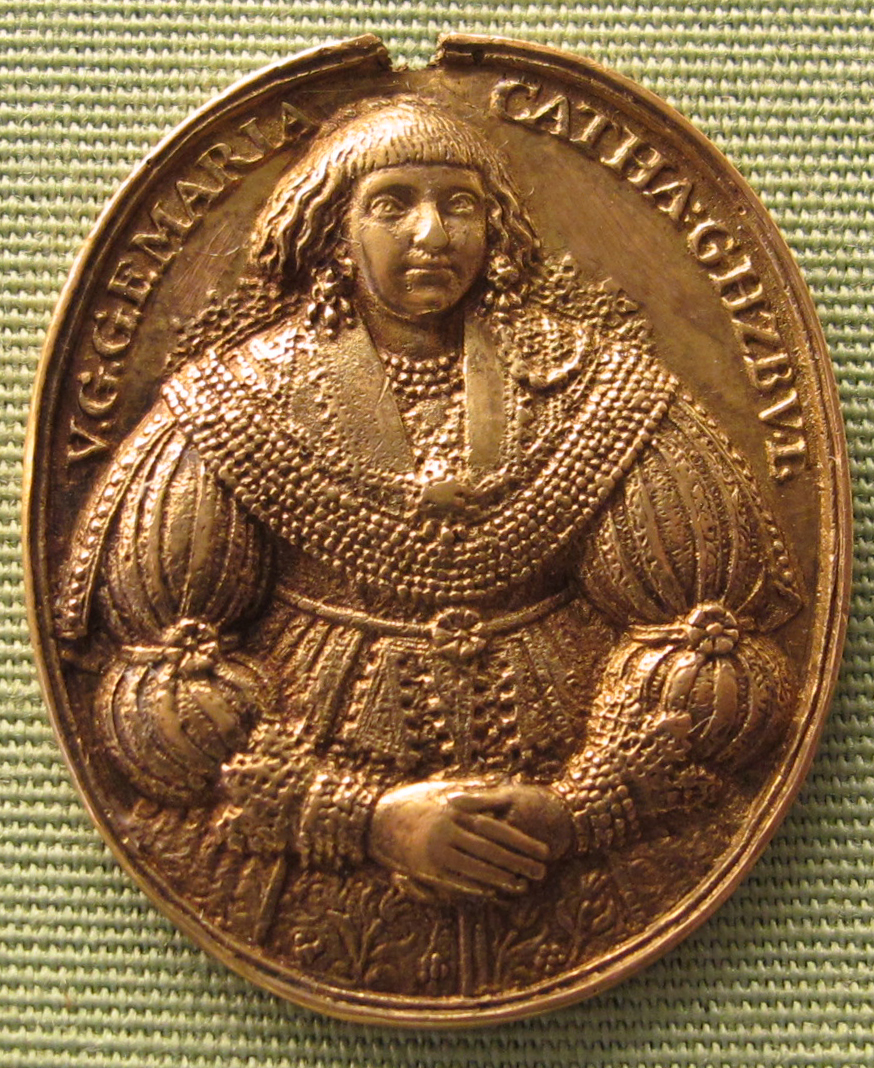
Marie Katharina on a medal (1635)

Adolf Frederick I fathered 19 children in total.

He was married for the first time on 4 September 1622 to his first cousin Anna Maria of Ostfriesland (1601–1634), daughter of Count Enno III of East Frisia and Anna of Schleswig-Holstein-Gottorp. They had the following children:

- Christian Louis I (Schwerin, 11 December 1623 – Den Haag, 21 June 1692), Duke of Mecklenburg-Schwerin.
- Sophie Agnes (Schwerin, 11 January 1625 – Rühn, 26 December 1694), Abbess of Rühn (1654).
- Charles (Schwerin, 8 March 1626 – Mirow, 20 August 1670), Duke of Mecklenburg-Mirow.
- Anna Maria (Schwerin, 1 July 1627 – Halle a.d.Saale, 11 December 1669), married in 1647 to August, Duke of Saxe-Weissenfels.
- John George (Lichtenburg, 5 May 1629 – Mirow, 9 July 1675), Duke of Mecklenburg-Mirow.
- Hedwig (Lübeck, 11 August 1630 – Lübz, 17 May 1631).
- Gustav Rudolph (Schwerin, 26 February 1632 – Tempzin, 14 May 1670), married Erdmuthe Sophie (1644–1689), daughter of Duke Francis Henry of Saxe-Lauenburg.
- Juliane (Schwerin, 8 November 1633 – Schwerin, 3 February 1634).

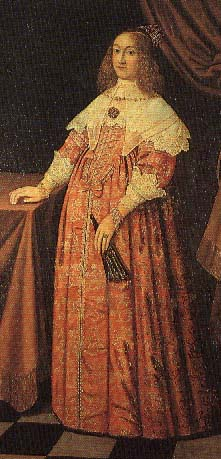
Adolf Frederick's second wife, Marie Katharina of Brunswick-Dannenberg

Adolf Frederick married for a second time in 1635 to Marie Katharina (1616–1665), daughter of Duke Julius Ernest, Duke of Brunswick-Dannenberg, and Maria of East Frisia (1582–1616). They had the following children:

- Juliane Sibylla (Schwerin, 16 February 1636 – Rühn, 2 October 1701), Abbess of Rühn (9 March 1695).
- Frederick I (Schwerin, 13 February 1638 – Schloss Grabow, 28 April 1688), Duke of Mecklenburg-Grabow.
- Christina (Schwerin, 8 August 1639 – Gandersheim, 30 June 1693), Abbess of Gandersheim (1681).
- Bernhard Sigismund (Schwerin, 21 January 1641 – Schwerin, 15 November 1641).
- Augusta (Schwerin, 24 September 1643 – Schwerin, 5 May 1644).
- Maria Elisabeth (Schwerin, 24 March 1646 – Gandersheim, 27 April 1713), Abbess of Rühn (1705), Abbess of Gandersheim (1712).
- Anna Sophia (Schwerin, 24 November 1647 – Juliusburg, 13 August 1723), married in 1677 to Julius Siegmund, Duke of Württemberg-Juliusburg.
- Adolph Ernest (Schwerin, 22 November 1650 – Schwerin, 13 January 1651).
- Philipp Louis (Schwerin, 30 May 1652 – Schwerin, 20 October 1655).
- Henry William (Schwerin, 6 June 1653 – Schwerin, 2 December 1653).
- Adolf Frederick II (posthumously Grabow, 19 October 1658 – 12 May 1708), Duke of Mecklenburg-Strelitz.

== Ancestry ==
Ancestors of Adolphus Frederick I

8. Albrecht VII, Duke of Mecklenburg
4. John Albert, Duke of Mecklenburg
9. Anna of Brandenburg
2. John VII, Duke of Mecklenburg-Schwerin
10. Albert, Duke of Prussia
5. Anna Sophia of Prussia
11. Dorothea of Denmark (1504-1547)
1. Adolphus Frederick I
12. Frederick I of Denmark (=22)
6. Adolf, Duke of Holstein-Gottorp
13. Sophie of Pomerania
3. Sophia of Holstein-Gottorp
14. Philip I, Landgrave of Hesse
7. Christine of Hesse
15. Christine of Saxony

Adolphus Frederick of Mecklenburg House of Nikloting Born: 15 December 1588 in Schwerin Died: 27 February 1658 ibidem
Regnal titles
Preceded by John VII	Duke of Mecklenburg-Schwerin as Adolphus Frederick I 1592–1628 and again 1631–1658 interrupted by Wallenstein, who deposed him	Succeeded by Christian Louis I, Duke of Mecklenburg (German)
Religious titles
Regnal titles
Vacant Title last held by Ulrik of Denmark as Ulrich III	Administrator of the Prince-Bishopric of Schwerin; 1634–1648	Secularised: Principality of Schwerin in personal union with Mecklenburg-Schwerin
