= Duchy of Mecklenburg =

Duchy of the Holy Roman Empire

Duchy of Mecklenburg Herzogtum Mecklenburg (German) Ducatus Megalopolis (Latin)
- 1471–1520; 1695–1701
- Status: State of the Holy Roman Empire
- Capital: Schwerin
- Religion: Roman Catholic
- Government: Duchy
- Duke
  - 1471–1477 (first of the first state): Henry IV
  - 1503–1520 (last of the first state): Albrecht VII; Henry V, Duke of Mecklenburg
  - 1695–1701 (second state): Frederick William
- Historical era: Late Middle Ages; Early modern period
  - Unification of Mecklenburg-Stargard and Mecklenburg-Schwerin: 1471
  - Partition into Mecklenburg-Güstrow and Mecklenburg-Schwerin: 7 May 1520
  - Unification of Mecklenburg-Güstrow and Mecklenburg-Schwerin: 1695
  - Partition into Mecklenburg-Schwerin and Mecklenburg-Strelitz: 1701
Preceded by
Mecklenburg-Stargard
Mecklenburg-Schwerin
Mecklenburg-Güstrow
Succeeded by
Mecklenburg-Schwerin
Mecklenburg-Güstrow
Mecklenburg-Strelitz
- Today part of: Germany

The Duchy of Mecklenburg (Note: German: Herzogtum Mecklenburg; Latin: Ducatus Megalopolis) was a duchy within the Holy Roman Empire, located in the region of Mecklenburg. It existed during the Late Middle Ages and the early modern period, from 1471 to 1520, as well as 1695 to 1701. Its capital was Schwerin.

The state was formed in 1471, when duke Henry IV, had united the duchies of Mecklenburg-Stargard and Mecklenburg-Schwerin. The state existed until 7 May 1520, when it was partitioned into the duchies of Mecklenburg-Güstrow and Mecklenburg-Schwerin. It was again reestablished in 1695, with the unification of Mecklenburg-Güstrow and Mecklenburg-Schwerin. Frederick William became the duke. In 1701, it was partitioned into the duchies of Mecklenburg-Schwerin and Mecklenburg-Strelitz.

== List of rulers ==
=== First state ===
- Henry IV and John VI (1471–1472)
- Henry IV (1472–1477)
- Magnus II, Albert VI and Balthasar (1477–1483)
- Magnus II and Balthasar (1483–1503)
- Balthasar, Eric II, Albrecht VII and Henry V, Duke of Mecklenburg (1503–1507)
- Eric II, Albrecht VII and Henry V, Duke of Mecklenburg (1508)
- Albrecht VII and Henry V, Duke of Mecklenburg (1508–1520)

=== Second state ===
- Frederick William (1695–1701)

== Citations ==
=== Bibliography ===
- Ludwig Fromm (1877). "Frederick William, Duke of Mecklenburg-Schwerin". Allgemeine Deutsche Biographie (in German). Vol. 7. Leipzig: Duncker & Humblot. pp. 557–558.
