= Principality of Ratzeburg =

Principality of Ratzeburg Fürstentum Ratzeburg (German)
- 1648–1815
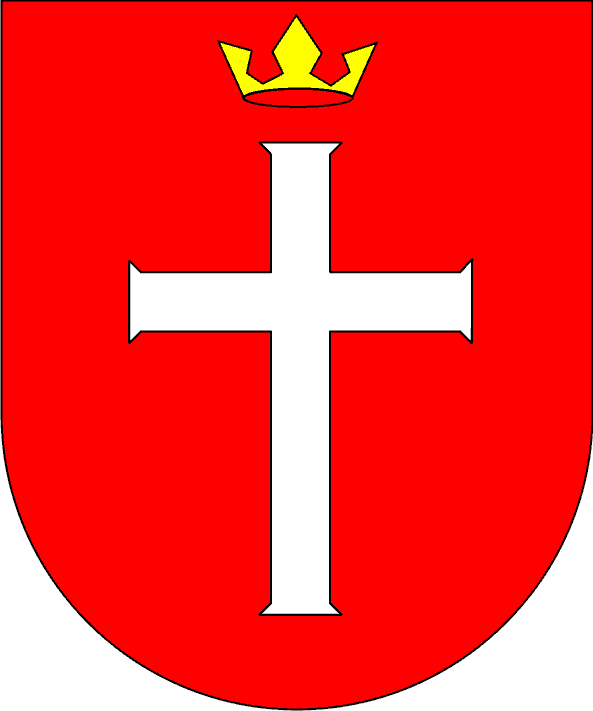
- Coat of arms

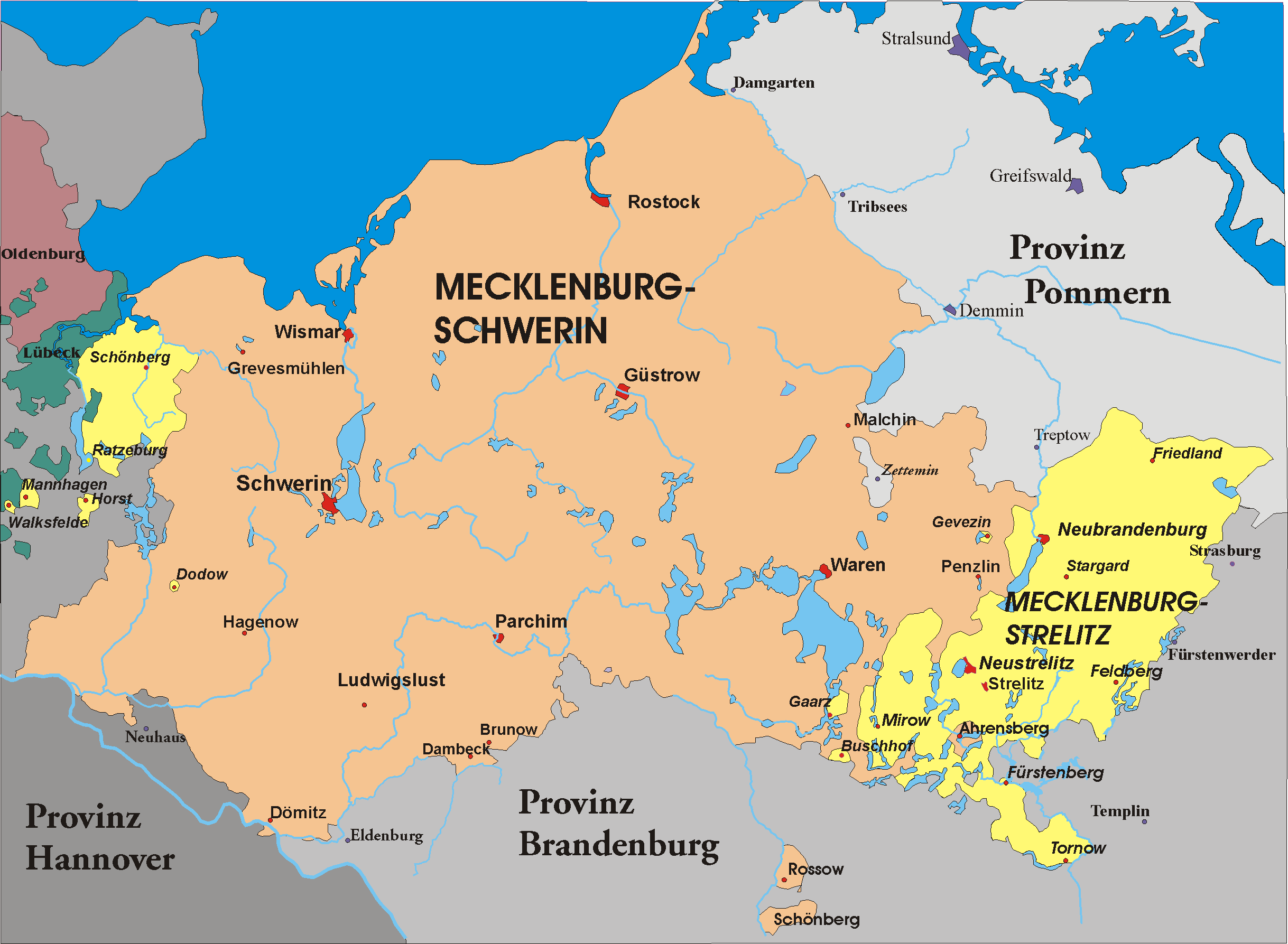
- The Principality of Ratzeburg (left-hand yellow territory) within the Duchy of Mecklenburg
- Government: Principality
- History
  - Peace of Westphalia – secularised to Mecklenburg-Güstrow: 24 October 1648
  - Treaty of Hamburg – to Mecklenburg-Strelitz: 8 March 1701
  - Subsumed by Grand Duchy of Mecklenburg-Strelitz: 1815
| Preceded by |
| Prince-Bishopric of Ratzeburg |
- Today part of: Germany

The Principality of Ratzeburg (German: Fürstentum Ratzeburg) is a former state, existing from 1648 to 1918. It belonged to the imperially immediate territory of the Duchy of Mecklenburg within the Holy Roman Empire. It was formed from the territory of the former Prince-Bishopric of Ratzeburg, which was secularised to Mecklenburg-Güstrow in the 1648 Peace of Westphalia. Following the death of the last duke in 1695, the territories of Mecklenburg-Güstrow were split up in the 1701 Treaty of Hamburg (the third partition of Mecklenburg), which created the semi-ducal states of Mecklenburg-Schwerin and Mecklenburg-Strelitz, with the latter made up of the Principality of Ratzeburg and the Lordship of Stargard. Its territories remained exclaves of Mecklenburg-Strelitz through its later iterations – the Grand Duchy from 1815 and Free State from 1918 – before the bulk of it was finally incorporated into the unified state of Mecklenburg in 1934 as part of Landkreis Schönberg; its small exclaves were incorporated into Kreis Herzogtum Lauenburg of Schleswig-Holstein. Most of the Principality is now within the state of Mecklenburg-Vorpommern.

== Bibliography ==
- Gottlieb Matthias Carl Masch: Geschichte des Bisthums Ratzeburg. F. Aschenfeldt, Lübeck 1835 (Volltext).
- Gottlieb Matthias Carl Masch: Das Ratzeburgische Wappen. In: Jahrbücher des Vereins für Mecklenburgische Geschichte und Altertumskunde . Band 1, 1836, S. 143–151
- Gottlieb Matthias Carl Masch: Gesetze, Verordnungen und Verfügungen, welche für das Fürstenthum Ratzeburg erlassen sind. L. Bicker, Schönberg 1851
- Theodor Scharenberg: Gesetze, Verordnungen und Verfügungen, welche in Kirchen- und Schulsachen für das Fürstentum Ratzeburg erlassen sind. Fortsetzung der Gesetzsammlung von Masch, soweit die letztere Kirchen- und Schulsachen betrifft. Spalding, Neustrelitz 1893
- Reno Stutz: Ratzeburger Land. Mecklenburgs ungewöhnlicher Landesteil zwischen Wismar und Lübeck. 2. Auflage. Neuer Hochschulschriften Verlag, Rostock 1997, ISBN 3-929544-37-7.
