= Sophie of Mecklenburg =

Sophie of Mecklenburg may refer to:

- Sophie of Mecklenburg (1481–1503), daughter of Magnus II, Duke of Mecklenburg, and wife of John, Elector of Saxony
- Sophie of Mecklenburg, Duchess of Brunswick-Lüneburg (1508–1541), daughter of Henry V, Duke of Mecklenburg, and wife of Ernest I, Duke of Brunswick-Lüneburg
- Sophie of Mecklenburg-Güstrow, daughter of Ulrich, Duke of Mecklenburg, and wife of Frederick II of Denmark
- Sophie of Mecklenburg-Güstrow, Duchess of Württemberg-Oels (1662–1738), daughter of Gustav Adolph, Duke of Mecklenburg-Güstrow, and wife of Christian Ulrich I, Duke of Württemberg-Oels
- Duchess Sophia Frederica of Mecklenburg-Schwerin (1758–1794), daughter of Duke Louis of Mecklenburg-Schwerin, and wife of Frederick, Hereditary Prince of Denmark
- Duchess Elisabeth Sophie of Mecklenburg (1613–1676), daughter of John Albert II, Duke of Mecklenburg, and wife of Augustus the Younger, Duke of Brunswick-Lüneburg
- Sophia Louise of Mecklenburg-Schwerin (1685–1735), daughter of Frederick, Duke of Mecklenburg-Grabow, and wife Frederick I of Prussia
- Duchess Ulrike Sophie of Mecklenburg-Schwerin (1723–1813), daughter of Christian Ludwig II, Duke of Mecklenburg-Schwerin
- Sophie of Pomerania, Duchess of Mecklenburg (1460–1504), wife of Magnus II, Duke of Mecklenburg
