= Magnus II of Mecklenburg =

German noble (1441–1503)

Magnus II
- Duke of Mecklenburg
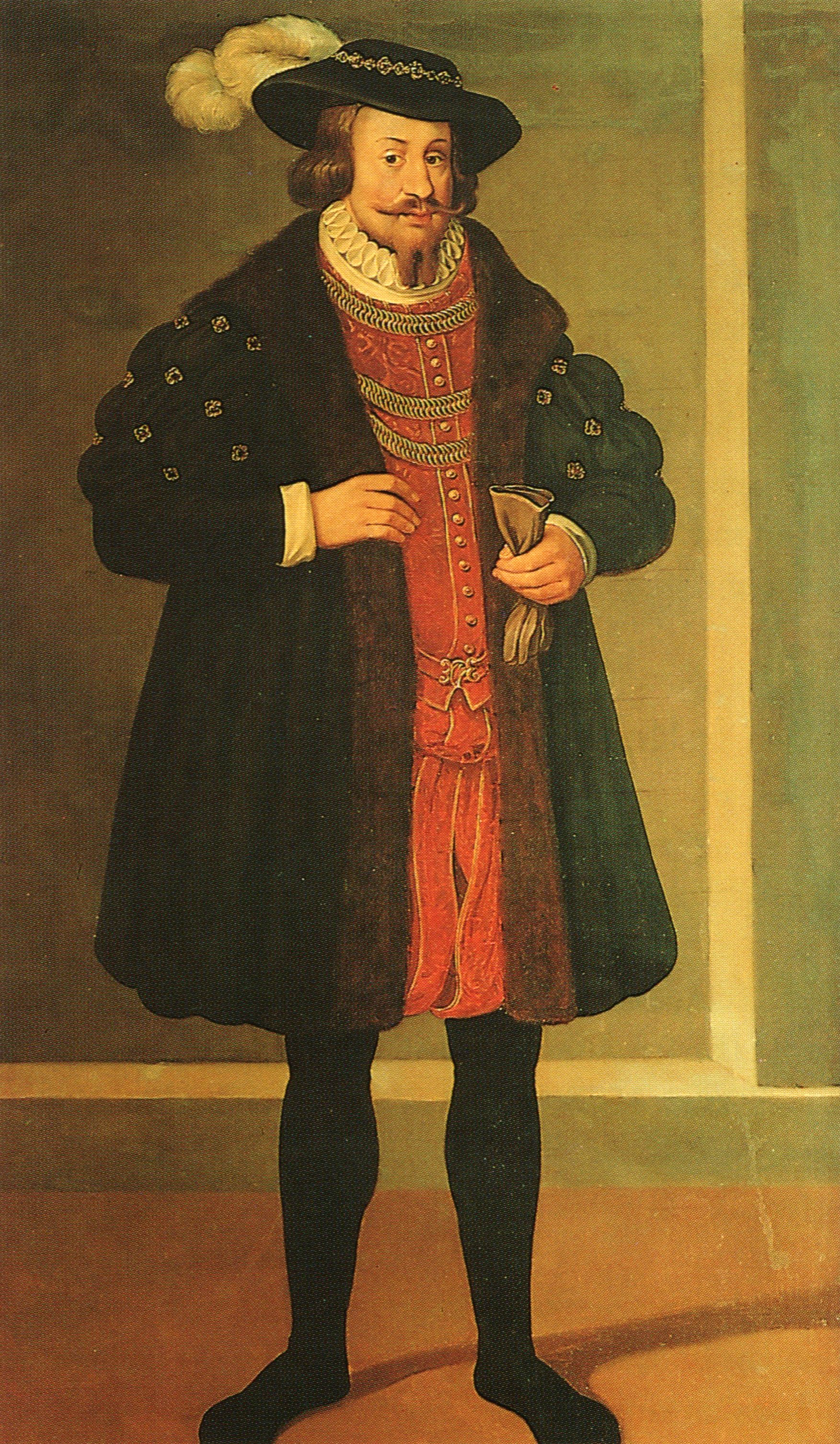
- Portrait by Theodor Fischer, mid-19th century
- Born: 1441
- Died: 20 November 1503 (aged 61–62); Wismar
- Burial: Doberan Minster
- Spouse: Sophie of Pomerania-Stettin (m. 1478)
- Issue: Henry V, Duke of Mecklenburg; Dorothea of Mecklenburg; Sophie, Electoral Princess of Saxony; Eric II, Duke of Mecklenburg; Anna, Landgravine of Hesse; Catherine, Duchess of Saxony; Albert VII, Duke of Mecklenburg
- House: Mecklenburg
- Father: Henry IV, Duke of Mecklenburg
- Mother: Dorothea of Hohenzollern

Magnus II, Duke of Mecklenburg-Schwerin and Güstrow (1441 – 20 November 1503) was duke of Mecklenburg-Schwerin from 1477 until his death.

== Biography ==
He was the son of Henry IV, Duke of Mecklenburg-Schwerin, and Dorothea of Brandenburg, daughter of Elector Frederick I of Brandenburg. Duke Henry IV had re-united the Mecklenburg lands under his rule through his inheritance of the former Lordships of Werle and Stargard in 1436 and 1471, respectively. Near the end of his life, Henry IV devoted more and more time to hedonistic luxury, while Magnus and his brothers Albert and John took over the most active share in the business of government. John died in 1474 leaving a grieving widow, Sophie of Pomerania-Stettin, daughter of Eric II of Pomerania, whom Magnus married himself on 29 May 1478.

After Henry died in 1477, Magnus ruled the Duchy jointly with Albert. After Albert died in 1483, Magnus ruled alone, as his younger brother Balthasar did not care at all about governing. Magnus reigned until his death in 1503, when he was succeeded by his sons Henry V, Eric II and Albert VII, who at first ruled jointly until they split their lands into the duchies of Mecklenburg-Schwerin and Mecklenburg-Güstrow in 1520.

The duchy's debt increased excessively due to the lavish court life of Henry IV. Magnus sought to reduce that debt. He curtailed his ducal household in every way, and pawned goods and regalia. He tried to restore the shattered finances through the introduction of extraordinary Beden (from Lower Saxon Beden: goods to be delivered to the manor by the serfs). This caused tensions with the Hanseatic cities of Rostock and Wismar that were trying to achieve a more independent position.

In 1487 a rebellion broke out in Rostock known as the "Rostock Cathedral Feud" (German: Rostock Domfehde). The trigger was the establishment of a collegiate church (commonly known as Dom) at the Church of St. James (Jacobikirche). With this action, Magnus II wanted to secure the financing of the university and his position of power within the city. On 12 January 1487, the day the church was to be consecrated, Provost Thomas Rode was murdered in the street. Dignitataries present for the consecration had to flee the city. Magnus feared for his own life when his entourage was attacked. His life was saved by a bodyguard who threw himself on top of Magnus in the thick of the melee. The rebellion lasted until 1491. In the end, rebel leader Hans Runge and three other insurgents were executed and the city had to recognize the cathedral chapter, pay a substantial fine and confirm all of the Duke's privileges. The excommunication and interdict under which Magnus and Balthasar had been placed by Holy Roman Emperor Frederick III and Pope Innocent VIII were then rescinded.

Besides these feuds in his own country, Magnus also had disputes with neighbouring princes and with his vassals, as was usual in those days, for example over inheritances, fiefs and border disputes. Magnus would participate in battles or mediate between the contending parties. Certain projects intended to benefit the economic position of his territories, such as the proposed canal connecting the Baltic Sea with the Elbe and North Sea via Lake Schwerin and the improvement of the quality of the Mecklenburg coinage had to be postponed indefinitely due to a lack of funding. In 1492, 27 Jews in Sternberg were condemned to death after being accused of desecrating bleeding communion wafers. Magnus confirmed the verdict, and the Jews were executed at the stake.

In his domestic life he had the pleasure of seeing two of his daughters marry respected German princes. His daughter Anna became the matriarch of the House of Hesse and Sophie assumed the same status for the Ernestine line of the House of Wettin. After Magnus' death, his youngest daughter Catherine achieved fame in her own right as the mother of the famous Duke Maurice of Saxony.

Magnus died on 20 November 1503 in Wismar and was later buried in Doberan Abbey.

== Offspring ==
Magnus II was married to Sophie of Pomerania-Stettin. With her he had the following children:

- Henry V, the Peaceable, (1479–1552), Duke of Mecklenburg-Schwerin; married three times. Firstly, on 12 December 1505, he married Ursula of Brandenburg, with whom he had issue. He married secondly, on 12 June 1513, Helen of the Palatinate, with whom he also had issue. Finally, he married Ursula of Saxe-Lauenburg, with whom he had no issue.
- Dorothea of Mecklenburg (21 October 1480 – 1 September 1537 in Ribnitz), Abbess in the Ribnitz monastery from 24 February 1498.
- Sophie, (18 December 1481 – 12 July 1503 in Torgau); married, on 1 March 1500, John the Steadfast of Saxony and had issue.
- Eric II, (1483–1508), Duke of Mecklenburg-Schwerin
- Anna of Mecklenburg-Schwerin, (1485–1525), Landgravine of Hesse; married firstly, on 20 October 1500, William II, Landgrave of Hesse, and had issue. Married secondly, on 7 September 1519, Otto of Solms-Laubach and had issue.
- Catherine of Mecklenburg, (1487–1561), Duchess of Saxony; married, on 6 July 1512, Henry IV, Duke of Saxony, and had issue.
- Albert VII, the Handsome (1486–1547), Duke of Mecklenburg-Güstrow; married, on 17 January 1524, Anna of Brandenburg and had issue.

== Ancestry ==
Ancestors of Magnus II of Mecklenburg

8. Magnus I, Duke of Mecklenburg-Schwerin
4. John IV, Duke of Mecklenburg-Schwerin
9. Elizabeth of Pomerania-Wolgast
2. Henry IV, Duke of Mecklenburg-Schwerin
10. Eric IV of Saxe-Lauenburg
5. Catherine of Saxe-Lauenburg, Duchess of Mecklenburg
11. Sophia of Brunswick-Lüneburg
1. Magnus II, Duke of Mecklenburg-Schwerin and Güstrow
12. Frederick V, Burgrave of Nuremberg
6. Frederick I, Elector of Brandenburg
13. Elisabeth of Meissen
3. Dorothea of Brandenburg
14. Frederick, Duke of Bavaria-Landshut
7. Elisabeth of Bavaria-Landshut
15. Maddalena Visconti

Magnus II of Mecklenburg House of Mecklenburg Born: 1441 Died: 15 November 1503
Regnal titles
Preceded by Henry IV	Dukes of Mecklenburg; 1477–1479 with Albert VI (brother) (1477–1479)	Succeeded by Albert VI as Duke of Mecklenburg-Güstrow
Preceded by Henry IV	Dukes of Mecklenburg; 1477–1479 with Albert VI (brother) (1477–1479)	Succeeded by Balthasar and Magnus II as Dukes of Mecklenburg-Schwerin
Preceded by Magnus II and Albert VI as Dukes of Mecklenburg	Dukes of Mecklenburg-Schwerin in 1483 M.-Güstrow reverted to M.-Schwerin; 1479–1503 with Balthasar (brother) (1479–1507)	Succeeded by Balthasar, Albert VII, Eric II and Henry V
Preceded by Albert VI of Mecklenburg-Güstrow	Dukes of Mecklenburg-Schwerin in 1483 M.-Güstrow reverted to M.-Schwerin; 1479–1503 with Balthasar (brother) (1479–1507)	Succeeded by Balthasar, Albert VII, Eric II and Henry V
