= Dorothea of Brandenburg, Duchess of Mecklenburg =

Dorothea of Brandenburg
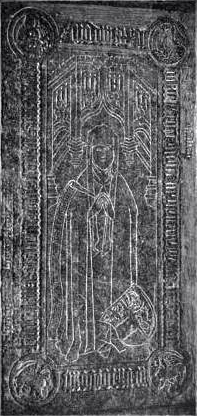
- Grave of Dorothea of Brandenburg.
- Born: 9 February 1420; Berlin
- Died: 19 January 1491 (aged 70); Benedictine monastery at Rehna
- Buried: Gadebusch
- Spouse: Henry IV, Duke of Mecklenburg
- Father: Frederick I, Elector of Brandenburg
- Mother: Elisabeth of Bavaria-Landshut

Dorothea of Brandenburg (9 February 1420 – 19 January 1491) was a princess of Brandenburg by birth and by marriage Duchess of Mecklenburg.

== Life ==
Dorothea was born in Berlin, a daughter of the Elector Frederick I of Brandenburg (1371–1440) from his marriage to Elisabeth (1383–1442), daughter of Duke Frederick of Bayern-Landshut. Dorothea's brothers were Electors Frederick II and Albert Achilles, who successively ruled Brandenburg.

In May 1432, Dorothea married Duke Henry IV of Mecklenburg (1417–1477). She received as dowry Dömitz and Gorlosen, which her sister Margaret had also received when she married into the House of Mecklenburg. Margaret's husband, Albet V, however, had died shortly after the marriage. When a dispute arose later between Brandenburg and Mecklenburg about the inheritance of the principality of Wenden, the family ties between Duke Henry and Elector Frederick made it easier to reach a settlement.

Henry IV died in 1477 and after 1485 Dorothea lived as a nun in the Rehna convent. She died at the Benedictine monastery at Rehna in 1491 and was buried in the City Church of St. James' Church and St. Dionysius in Gadebusch. Her grave stone is marked with an incised drawing of the Duchess as a nun, crowned by a canopy.

== Issue ==
From her marriage with Henry, Dorothy had the following children:

- Albert VI (1438–1483), Duke of Mecklenburg

married in 1466 or 1468 Countess Catherine of Lindau-Ruppin († 1485)

- John VI († 1474), Duke of Mecklenburg
- Magnus II (1441–1503), Duke of Mecklenburg

married in 1478 princess Sophie of Pomerania (1460-1504)

- Catherine (1442-1451/52)
- Anna (1447–1464)
- Elisabeth (1449–1506), abbess of Ribnitz
- Balthasar (1451–1507), Duke of Mecklenburg, coadjutor in the diocese of Schwerin until 1479
