= Duchy of Mecklenburg-Strelitz =

German state (1701–1815)

Duchy of Mecklenburg-Strelitz Herzogtum Mecklenburg-Strelitz (German)
- 1701–1815
- Flag (1813–1815) Coat of arms

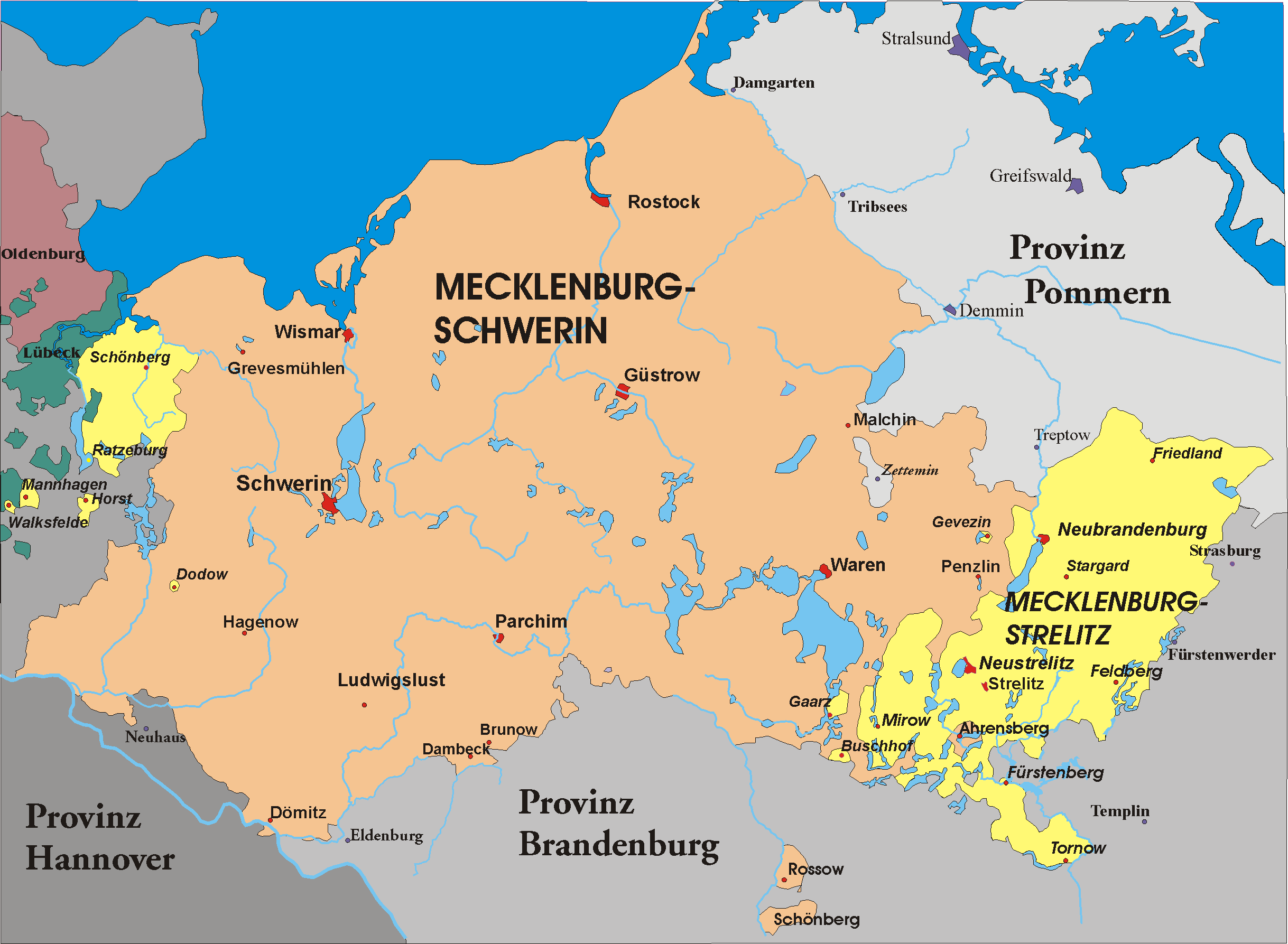
- Status: State of the Holy Roman Empire (until 1806); Independent duchy (1806–1808); Member of the Confederation of the Rhine (1808–1813); Independent duchy (1813–1815)
- Capital: Strelitz then Neustrelitz
- Religion: Lutheran
- Government: Duchy
- Duke of Mecklenburg-Strelitz
  - 1701–1708: Adolphus Frederick II
  - 1708–1752: Adolphus Frederick III
  - 1752–1794: Adolphus Frederick IV
  - 1794–1815: Charles II
- History
  - Treaty of Hamburg: 1701
  - Raised to Grand Duchy: 1815
Preceded by	Succeeded by
Duchy of Mecklenburg	Grand Duchy of Mecklenburg-Strelitz
- Today part of: Germany

The Duchy of Mecklenburg-Strelitz was a duchy in Northern Germany consisting of the eastern fifth of the historic Mecklenburg region, roughly corresponding with the present-day Mecklenburg-Strelitz district (the former Lordship of Stargard), and the western Principality of Ratzeburg exclave (the former Prince-Bishopric of Ratzeburg), which lay mostly in the west of the modern Nordwestmecklenburg district. At the time of its establishment, the main part of the duchy bordered on the territory of Swedish Pomerania in the north and of Brandenburg in the south; Ratzeburg bordered Saxe-Lauenburg and the Free City of Lübeck.

== History ==
After more than five years of dispute over succession to the House of Mecklenburg, the duchy was established in 1701 in the territory of the former duchy of Mecklenburg-Güstrow. The Güstrow branch of the House of Mecklenburg had died out with the death of Duke Gustav Adolph in 1695. Duke Frederick William of Mecklenburg-Schwerin claimed heirship, but he had to deal with the demands of his uncle Adolphus Frederick, husband of Mary of Mecklenburg-Güstrow, the daughter of Gustav Adolph. The emissaries of the Lower Saxon Circle finally negotiated a compromise on March 8, 1701. The agreement created the final, definitive division of Mecklenburg and was sealed with the 1701 Treaty of Hamburg. Section 2 of the treaty established Mecklenburg-Strelitz as a duchy in its own right and assigned it to Adolphus Frederick, together with the Principality of Ratzeburg on the western border of Mecklenburg south of Lübeck, the Herrschaft Stargard in the southeast of Mecklenburg, with the cities of Neubrandenburg, Friedland, Woldegk, Strelitz, Burg Stargard, Fürstenberg/Havel and Wesenberg, and the commandries of Mirow and Nemerow. At the same time the principle of primogeniture was reasserted, and the right to summon the joint Landtag was reserved to the Duke of Mecklenburg-Schwerin. The 1701 provisions were maintained with minor changes until the end of the monarchy. Both parties continued to call themselves Dukes of Mecklenburg; Adolphus Frederick took up his residence at Strelitz.

The Strelitz duchy remained one of the most backward regions of the Empire. Nevertheless, its princesses achieved prominent marriages: Princess Charlotte of Mecklenburg-Strelitz, sister of Duke Adolphus Frederick IV, married King George III in 1761, thus becoming queen consort of Great Britain. Her niece Princess Louise of Mecklenburg-Strelitz, daughter of Duke Charles II, Grand Duke of Mecklenburg, married Frederick William III of Hohenzollern in 1793 and became queen consort of Prussia in 1797. Her other niece, Louise's sister, Princess Friederike of Mecklenburg-Strelitz married in 1815 Prince Ernest Augustus, Duke of Cumberland, who, in 1837, became King of Hanover, making her queen consort of Hanover.

Mecklenburg-Strelitz adopted the constitution of the sister duchy in September 1755. In 1806 it was spared the infliction of a French occupation through the good offices of the King of Bavaria. In 1808 its duke, Charles, joined the Confederation of the Rhine, but in 1813 he withdrew from it. In 1815, the Congress of Vienna recognized both Mecklenburg-Strelitz and Mecklenburg-Schwerin as grand duchies and members of the German Confederation.
