= Sophie of Pomerania, Duchess of Mecklenburg =

Duchess of Mecklenburg from 1478 to 1504

Sophie of Pomerania-Stettin
- Duchess of Mecklenburg
- Sophie's grave monument at Nikolai Church
- Born: c. 1460
- Died: 26 April 1504 (aged 43–44); Wismar
- Buried: Black Monastery, Wismar (until 1880); St. Mary's Church, Wismar (until church's destruction); Nikolai Church, Wismar
- Noble family: House of Griffin
- Spouse: Magnus II, Duke of Mecklenburg
- Issue: Henry V, Duke of Mecklenburg; Dorothea of Mecklenburg; Sophie, Electoral Princess of Saxony; Eric II, Duke of Mecklenburg; Anna, Landgravine of Hesse; Catherine, Duchess of Saxony; Albert VII, Duke of Mecklenburg
- Father: Eric II, Duke of Pomerania
- Mother: Sophia of Pomerania-Stolp

Sophie of Pomerania-Stettin (c. 1460 – 26 April 1504, Wismar), was Duchess of Mecklenburg by marriage from 1478 to 1504.

She was the daughter of Eric II of Pomerania-Wolgast (d. 1474) and his wife Sophia of Pomerania-Stolp (d. 1497).

Her brother was Bogislaw X (1454-1523), who ruled the country for almost fifty years as a unified territory. Under Bogislaw X, Pomerania experienced a golden age: Szczecin was made the residence in 1491, the ducal administration was organised in a chancery, a well-regulated tax collection was introduced and peace and stability were maintained. For political reasons, the Duchy of Mecklenburg was anxious to see a merger with the House of Pomerania.

== Marriage and issue ==
Sophie of Pomerania was the fiancée of John VI, Duke of Mecklenburg, the brother of her later husband Magnus II of Mecklenburg. After John's death, Sophie went into a convent, and vowed perpetual chastity. But Magnus II was very attached to securing the border with Pomerania and therefore interested in a marriage with Sophie. He asked several priests for advice on how to set aside the vow, but this was in vain. He married Sophie on 29 May 1478 anyway, against the ecclesiastical laws. The pope did not sentence Magnus for this transgression; instead he awarded him the Golden Rose of Virtue, the highest ecclesiastical honors. On 3 April 1486 Sophie finally got dispensation from her vow, on the condition she provide three poor people annually with white woolen clothes in memory of the Virgin Mary.

- Henry V, the Peaceable, (1479–1552), Duke of Mecklenburg-Schwerin; married three times. Firstly, on 12 December 1505, he married Ursula of Brandenburg, with whom he had issue. He married secondly, on 12 June 1513, Helen of the Palatinate, with whom he also had issue. Finally, he married Ursula of Saxe-Lauenburg, with whom he had no issue.
- Dorothea of Mecklenburg (21 October 1480 – 1 September 1537 in Ribnitz), Abbess in the Ribnitz monastery from 24 February 1498.
- Sophie, (18 December 1481 – 12 July 1503 in Torgau); married, on 1 March 1500, John, the Steadfast, Elector of Saxony, and had issue.
- Eric II, (1483–1508), Duke of Mecklenburg-Schwerin
- Anna of Mecklenburg-Schwerin, (1485–1525), Landgravine of Hesse; married firstly, on 20 October 1500, William II, Landgrave of Hesse, and had issue. Married secondly, on 7 September 1519, Otto of Solms-Laubach and had issue.
- Catherine of Mecklenburg, (1487–1561), Duchess of Saxony; married, on 6 July 1512, Henry IV, Duke of Saxony, and had issue.
- Albert VII, the Handsome (1486–1547), Duke of Mecklenburg-Güstrow; married, on 17 January 1524, Anna of Brandenburg and had issue.

== Death ==
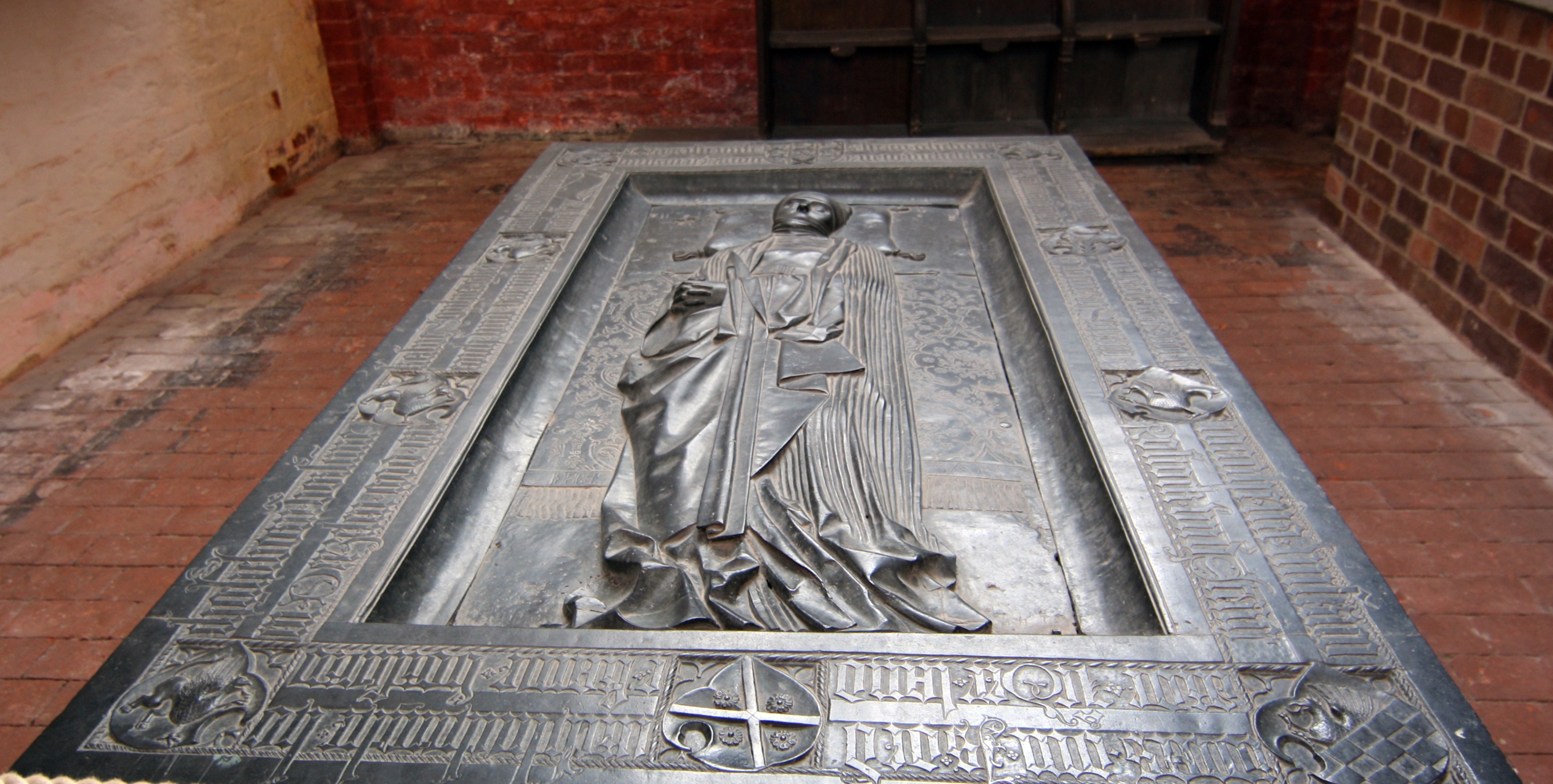
Grave of Sophie of Pomerania, Duchess of Mecklenburg

Like her daughter Anna of Mecklenburg-Schwerin over two decades later, Sophie insisted on being buried far from home. Whereas all her relatives on the Mecklenburg side, including her husband, had been buried in Doberan Abbey, she chose the Dominican monastery in Wismar as the final resting place. Sophie's funeral was the first of the ducal house in Wismar and - apart from her sister Margaret, the widow of Balthasar, on 27 March 1526 - also the last.

The bronze grave slab with the life-sized image of the Duchess resting on a Pomegranate blanket, first covered her tomb at the main altar of the church of the Black Monastery in Wismar until 1880. It was then moved to St. Mary's Church, also in Wismar, and after its destruction to the northern side chapel of the Nikolai Church, also in Wismar.

== Ancestors ==
Ancestors of Sophie of Pomerania, Duchess of Mecklenburg

8. Barnim VI, Duke of Pomerania
4. Wartislaw IX, Duke of Pomerania
9. Veronica of Hohenzollern
2. Eric II, Duke of Pomerania
10. Eric IV, Duke of Saxe-Lauenburg
5. Sophia of Saxe-Lauenburg-Ratzeburg
11. Sophia of Brunswick-Lüneburg
1. Sophie of Pomerania, Duchess of Mecklenburg
12. Bogislaw VIII, Duke of Pomerania
6. Bogusław IX
13. Sophie of Holstein
3. Sophie of Pomerania, Duchess of Pomerania
14. Siemowit IV, Duke of Masovia
7. Maria of Masovia
15. Alexandra of Lithuania
