= Eiríkr II =

Eiríkr II may refer to:

- Eric II of Denmark (c. 1090 – 1137)
- Eric II of Norway (1268–1299)

== See also ==
- Eric II (disambiguation)
