= John V of Mecklenburg =

Duke of Mecklenburg

- Born: 1418
- Died: between 1 November 1442 and 13 January 1443
- Father: John IV of Mecklenburg
- Mother: Catherine of Saxe-Lauenburg

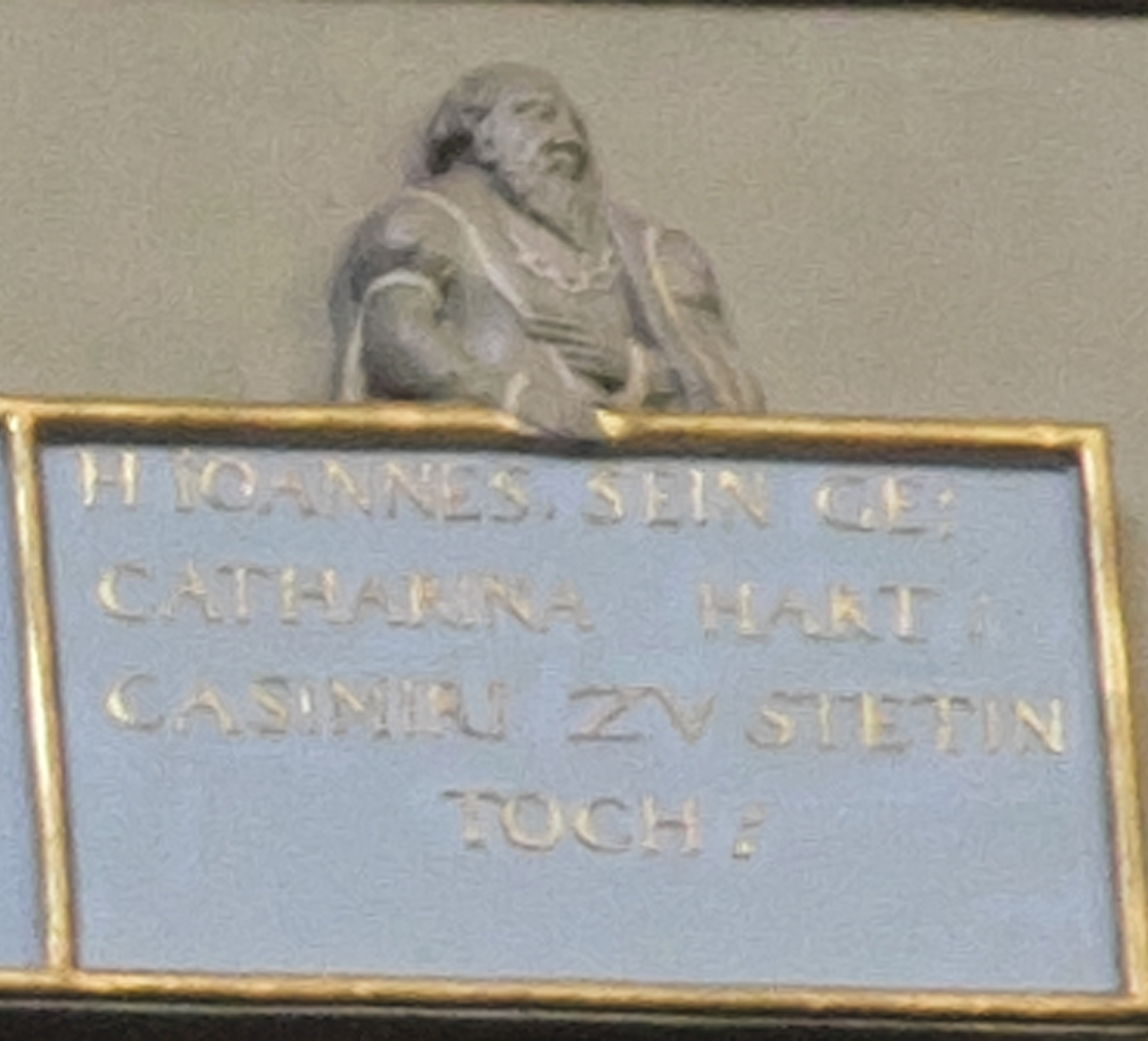
Carving of John V at Cathedral of St. Mary in Güstrow, Germany

John V of Mecklenburg (1418 – 1 November 1442/13 January 1443) was Duke of Mecklenburg from 1436 to 1442.

John was the son of the Duke John IV of Mecklenburg and Catherine of Saxe-Lauenburg. He ruled Mecklenburg-Schwerin after the death of his father, initially under regency of his mother Catherine, then from 1436 along with his brother Henry IV.

On 17 September 1436 he married Anna of Pomerania-Stettin (died after 14 May 1447), the daughter of Casimir V, Duke of Pomerania. He was probably buried in the Doberan Minster in Bad Doberan.

John V of Mecklenburg House of Mecklenburg Born: 1418 Died: 1442
Preceded by Henry IV	Duke of Mecklenburg-Schwerin; 1436–1442	Succeeded by Albert VII
