= Masch =

Masch is a surname. Notable people with the surname include:

- Andreas Gottlieb Masch (1724–1807), theologian and scholar
- Gottlieb Matthias Carl Masch (1794–1878), theologian, rector, pastor, historian, numismatist, and writer

== See also ==
- Masch Lake
