= Treaty of Hamburg =

Treaty of Hamburg may refer to:

- Treaty of Hamburg (1638)
- Treaty of Hamburg (1701)
- Treaty of Hamburg (1762)
