= Eric, Duke of Mecklenburg =

Eric, Duke of Mecklenburg may refer to:

- Eric I, Duke of Mecklenburg (after 1359 – 1397), eldest son and heir apparent of King Albert of Sweden, and the ruler of Gotland in 1397
- Eric II, Duke of Mecklenburg (1483–1508), rector of University of Rostock intermittently in 1499–1502 and the co-ruler of Mecklenburg-Schwerin in 1503–1508
