= John IV of Mecklenburg =

Duke of Mecklenburg

John IV, Duke of Mecklenburg
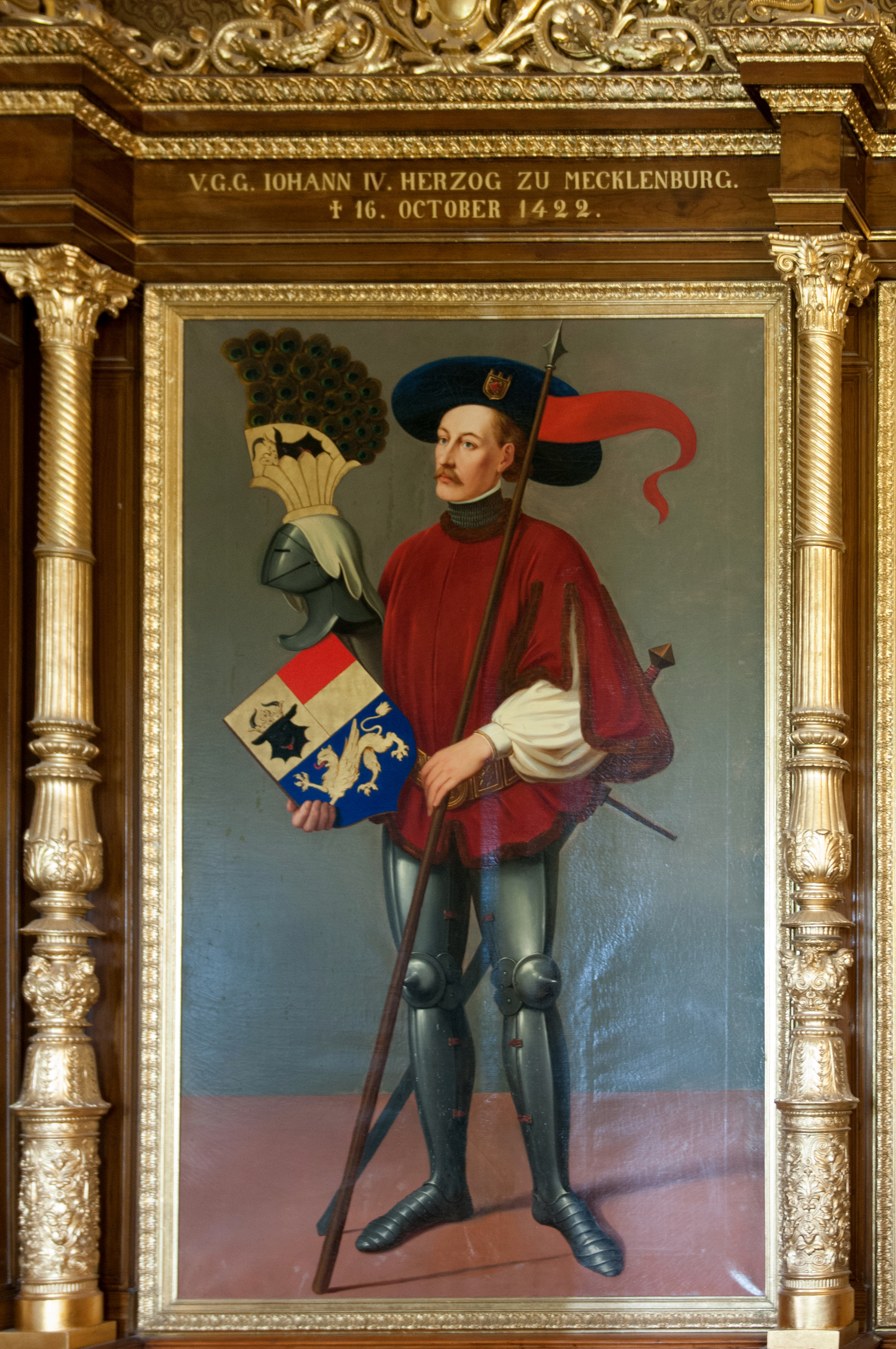
- 19th-century portrait by Theodor Fischer
- Born: before 1370
- Died: 16 October 1422; Schwerin
- Spouse: Jutta von Hoya; Catherine of Saxe-Lauenburg
- Father: Magnus I, Duke of Mecklenburg
- Mother: Elisabeth of Pomerania-Wolgast

John IV, Duke of Mecklenburg (before 1370 – 16 October 1422) was sole ruler of the Duchy of Mecklenburg from 1384 to 1395 and co-regent from 1395 to 1422.

== Life ==
John IV was the only son of the Duke Magnus I of Mecklenburg and his wife Elisabeth of Pommern-Wolgast. Ernst Boll incorrectly refers to him as "John III" in his History of Mecklenburg, Part 1.

After the death of his father in 1384 and his cousin Albert IV in 1388, John ruled Mecklenburg jointly with his uncle Albert III (also a King of Sweden). When Albert III was captured by the Danes in 1389 in connection with his rule in Sweden, John ruled as sole Regent of Mecklenburg until Albert's release in 1395. After Albert's death in 1412, John ruled jointly with Albert's son Albert V.

On 13 February 1419, John, Albert V of Mecklenburg and the Council of the City of Rostock founded the University of Rostock, the first university in northern Germany and in the entire Baltic region.

He helped his uncle Albert III in the enforcement of the latter's rights as Swedish king. In this case, he probably acted as a leader of the Victual Brothers.

The Germans had 900 infantry, their leader was called Enis, a German and a relative of Albert; another leader was called "Maekingborg", also a relative of Albert.

This "Enis" is probably John IV.

== Marriage and issue ==
John married twice: first to Countess Jutta of Hoya, who died in 1415, and secondly, in 1416, to Catherine, daughter of Duke Eric IV of Saxe-Lauenburg. Catherine's first marriage had been with John VII of Werle, who died in 1414.

John had two sons:

- Henry IV, the Fat, Duke of Mecklenburg (1417–1477)
- John V, Duke of Mecklenburg (1422–1442)

== Notes ==
John IV of Mecklenburg House of Mecklenburg Born: before 1370 Died: 16 October 1422
Preceded by Magnus I	Duke of Mecklenburg; 1384-1395	Succeeded by Albert III
