= Henry IV of Mecklenburg =

Henry IV
- Duke of Mecklenburg
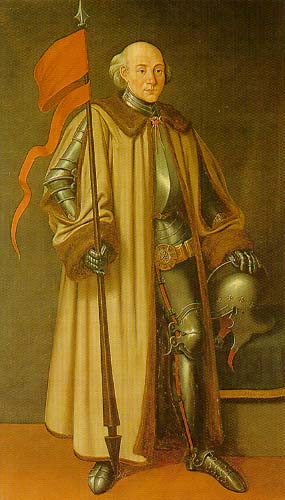
- Born: 1417
- Died: 9 March 1477 (aged 59–60)
- Spouse: Dorothea of Brandenburg (m. 1432)
- House: House of Mecklenburg
- Father: John IV, Duke of Mecklenburg
- Mother: Catherine of Saxe-Lauenburg

Henry IV, Duke of Mecklenburg (1417 – 9 March 1477) was from 1422 to 1477 Duke of Mecklenburg.

== Life ==
Henry IV of Mecklenburg, also called "Henry the Fat" because of his obesity and lavish lifestyle, was the son of the Duke John IV of Mecklenburg and Catherine of Saxe-Lauenburg.

He inherited Mecklenburg when his father died in 1422. His mother, Catherine, and his uncle, Albert V, acted as Regents until 1436. He then ruled jointly with his brother John V, until his brothers death in 1442. In May 1432, he married Dorothea of Brandenburg, the daughter of Elector Frederick I of Brandenburg.

With the death of Prince William of Werle in 1436, the male line of the Werle branch of the House of Mecklenburg died out, and Werle fell to the Duchy of Mecklenburg. After Duke Ulrich II of Mecklenburg-Stargard died in 1471, Mecklenburg was again united under one ruler.

The Stettin War of Succession between the Pomeranian Dukes and the Brandenburg Electors ended in late May 1472 through Henry's mediation.

At the end of his life, he gradually transferred his power to his sons Albert, John and Magnus. After Henry's death they ruled jointly, until John died in 1474 and Albert in 1483. After Albert's death, Magnus ruled alone. His younger brother Balthasar cared little about the business of government.

Henry died in 1477 and was buried in Doberan Abbey.

== Issue ==
- Albert VI († 1483), Duke of Mecklenburg
- John VI († 1474), Duke of Mecklenburg
- Magnus II, Duke of Mecklenburg
- Balthasar Duke of Mecklenburg, coadjutor of the diocese of Schwerin until 1479.

Henry IV of Mecklenburg House of Mecklenburg Born: 1417 Died: 9 March 1477
| Preceded by Albert V | Duke of Mecklenburg; 1422–1477 | Succeeded by Magnus II |
