= Eric II =

Eric II may refer to:

- Eric II of Denmark (c. 1090–1137)
- Eric II of Norway (1268–1299)
- Eric II, Duke of Schleswig (c. 1290–1325)
- Eric II of Pomerania (between 1418 and 1425–1474)
- Eric II, Duke of Mecklenburg (1483–1508)
- Eric II, Duke of Calenberg (1528–1584)
