= Treaty of Hamburg (1701) =

1701 dynastic house law of the House of Mecklenburg

Cover of the Treaty

The Treaty of Hamburg (German - Hamburger Vergleich or Hamburger Erbvergleich) was a dynastic house law of the House of Mecklenburg. Heavily influenced by representatives of the Lower Saxon Circle, it was agreed on 8 March 1701 in neutral Hamburg. It ended the dispute over the inheritance of the Mecklenburg-Güstrow state caused by the death of Gustav Adolph, Duke of Mecklenburg-Güstrow, without a male successor in 1695 and established the duchies of Mecklenburg-Strelitz and Mecklenburg-Schwerin.
