= Gottlieb Matthias Carl Masch =

Gottlieb Matthias Carl Masch (also known as Carl Masch, Karl Masch or misspelled as Gottlieb Matthäus Carl Masch; 4 August 1794, Schlagsdorf – 28 June 1878, Demern) was a German theologian, rector, pastor, historian, numismatist and writer on heraldry.

He worked as a schoolteacher and rector in the town of Schönberg. For forty years, up until his death in 1878, he served as a pastor in Demern. He wrote extensively on the history of Mecklenburg. In the field of heraldry he published "Wappen-almanach der souveränen Regenten Europa's" (1842).

== Selected works ==
- Geschichte des Bisthums Ratzeburg, F. Aschenfeldt, Lübeck (1835) – History of the Bishopric of Ratzeburg.
- Mecklenburgisches Wappenbuch, J. G. Tiedemann, Rostock (1838) – Mecklenburg armorial.
- Wappen-almanach der souveränen Regenten Europa's, Rostock:: Tiedemann (1842) – Crest almanac of the sovereign rulers of Europe.
- Geschichte und Urkunden der Familie von Kardorff, Schwerin: Stiller'sche Hofbuchhandlung (1850) – History and records of the Kardorff family.
- Gesetze, Verordnungen und Verfügungen, welche für das Fürstenthum Ratzeburg erlassen sind, Schönberg: L. Bicker (1851) – Laws, regulations and decrees that are adopted for the Principality of Ratzeburg.

== Bibliography ==
- https://de.wikisource.org/wiki/ADB:Masch,_Gottlieb_Matthias_Karl
- https://portal.dnb.de/opac.htm?method=simpleSearch&query=100839711
- http://www.landesbibliographie-mv.de/REL?PPN=233274677
- http://www.landesbibliographie-mv.de/REL?PPN=595581811
