= Sophie of Mecklenburg (1481–1503) =

Duchess of Mecklenburg by birth and by marriage Electoral Princess of Saxony

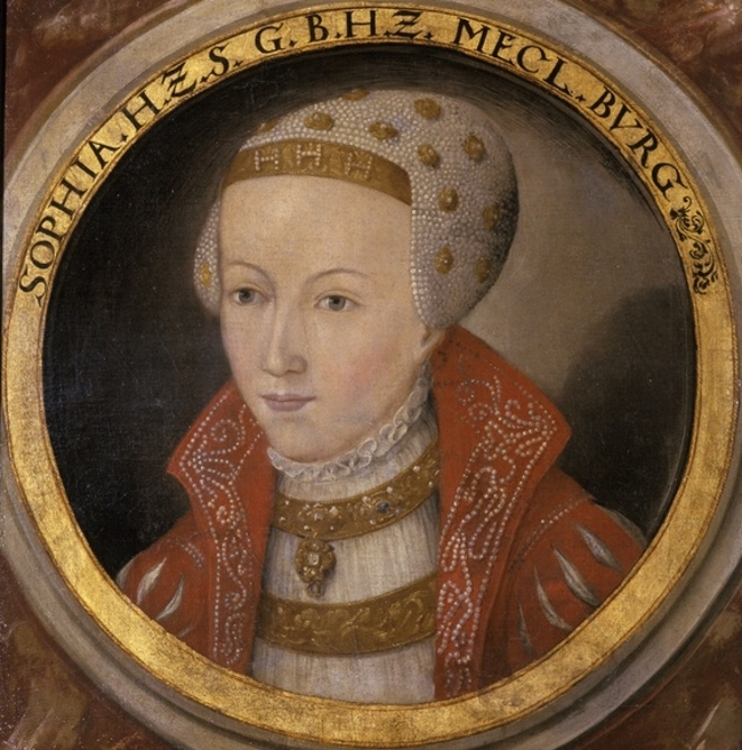
- Born: 18 December 1481
- Died: 12 July 1503 (aged 21); Torgau, Electorate of Saxony, Holy Roman Empire
- Buried: City church of St. Mary in Torgau
- Noble family: Mecklenburg
- Spouse: John, Elector of Saxony (m. 1500)
- Issue: John Frederick I, Elector of Saxony
- Father: Magnus II of Mecklenburg
- Mother: Sophie of Pomerania

Sophie of Mecklenburg, also spelled Sophia (18 December 1481 – 12 July 1503 in Torgau) was a German noblewoman. She was a Duchess of Mecklenburg by birth and by marriage Electoral Princess of Saxony.

== Life ==
Sophie was the third of seven children and the second daughter of Duke Magnus II of Mecklenburg and his wife Sophie of Pomerania.

On 1 March 1500, she married Electoral Prince John of Saxony. John and Sophie had a son together:

- John Frederick I (1503–1554), succeed his father as Elector of Saxony, married in 1527 to Sibylle of Cleves (1512–1554)

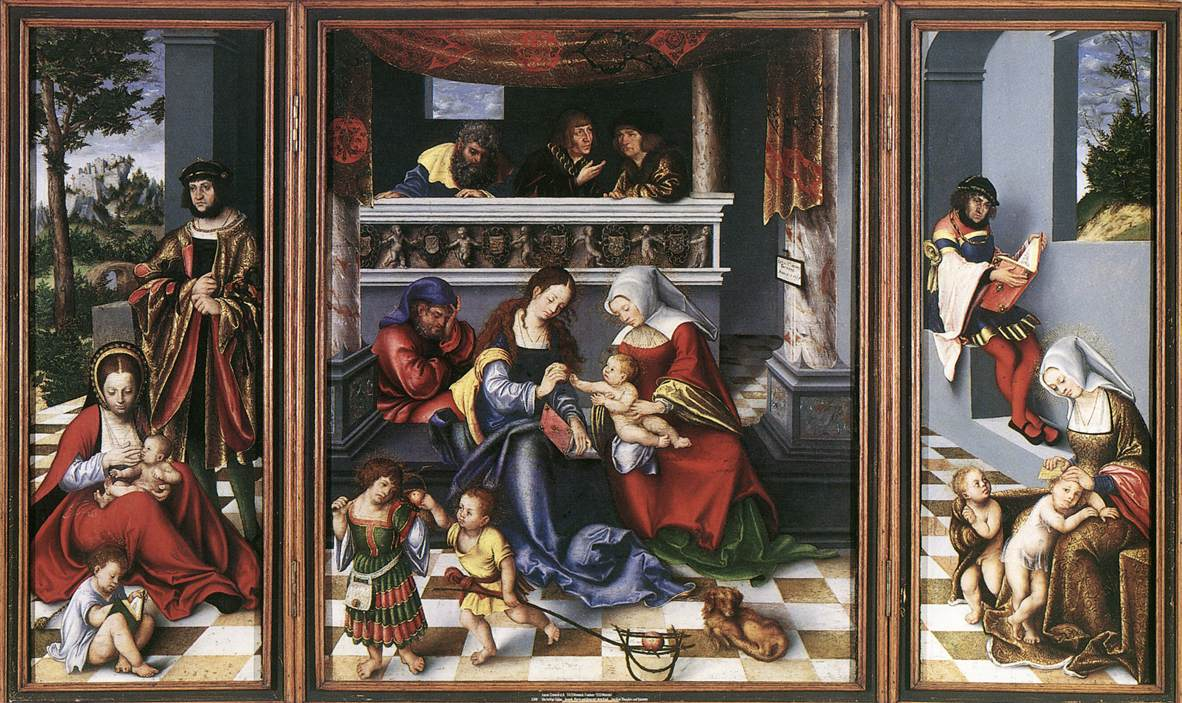
Torgau Altarpiece

Sophie died shortly after the birth of her son before her husband became Elector. She was buried in the city church of St. Mary in Torgau. Her bronze grave plate was crafted by Peter Vischer the Elder in his workshop in Nuremberg, after a design by Jacopo de' Barbari.

Her widower and his brother Frederick the Wise founded an altar in her memory. It was dedicated to Saint Anne and the Fourteen Holy Helpers, and was inaugurated on 18 July 1505. The brother commissioned an altar piece from Lucas Cranach the Elder. A triptych which is now on display at the Städel Museum in Frankfurt and is known as the Torgau Altarpiece, is generally believed to be this altarpiece. Another painting by Cranach, a compact representation of the Fourteen Holy Helpers, remained in Torgau, and is now placed behind her grave.

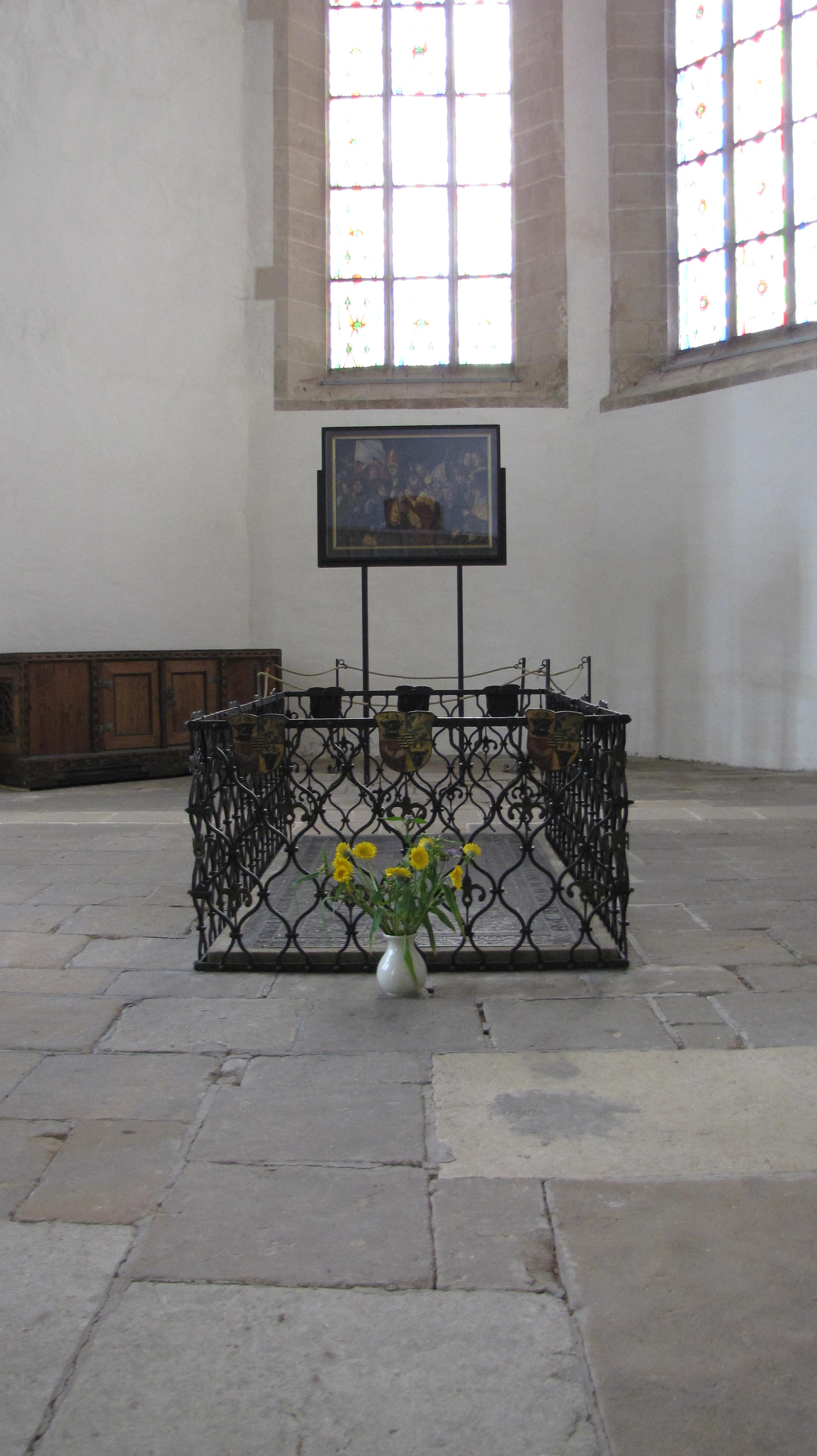
The grave in the south aisle; Cranach's Fourteen Holy Helpers can be seen behind the grave

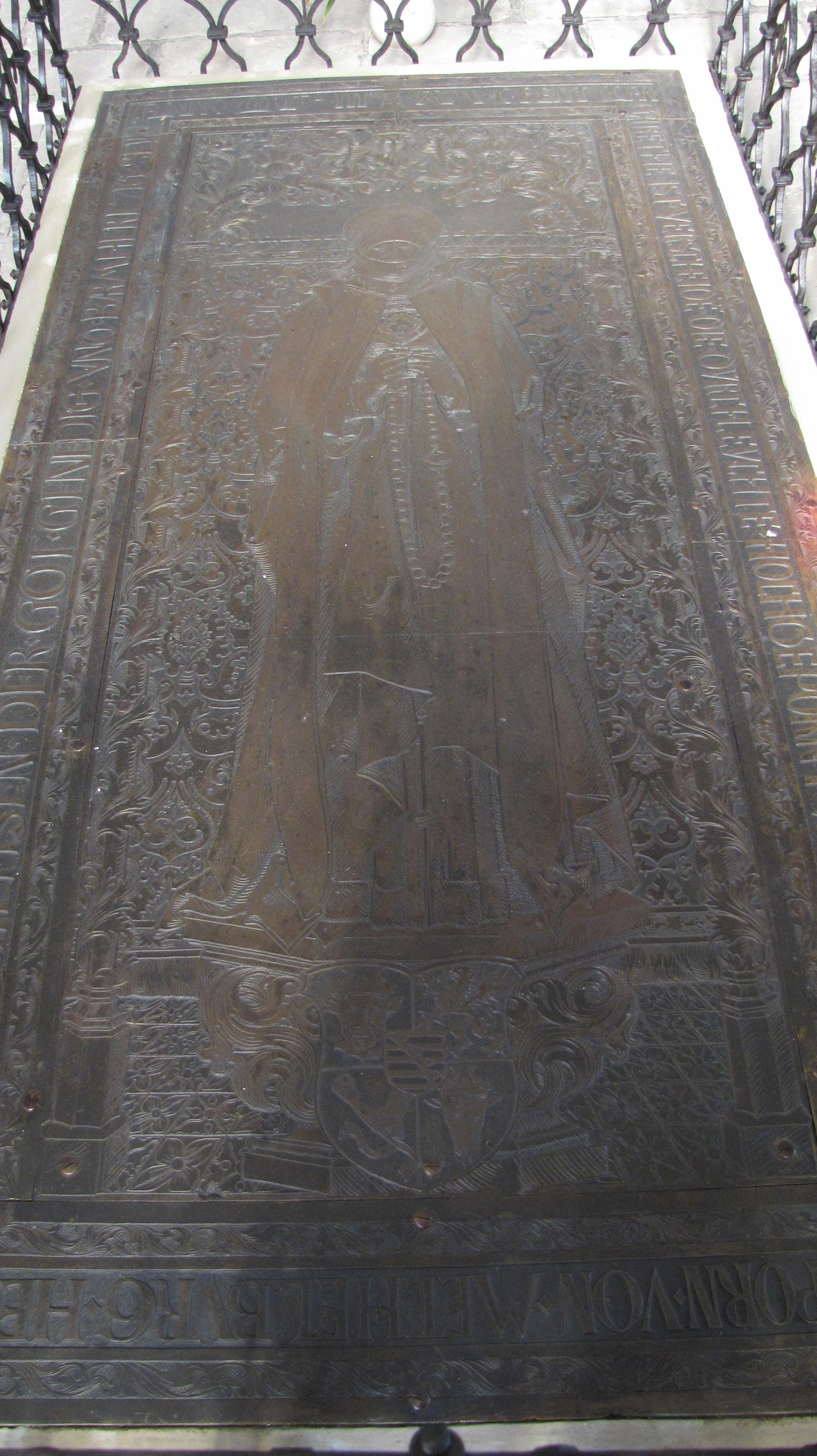
Grave plate

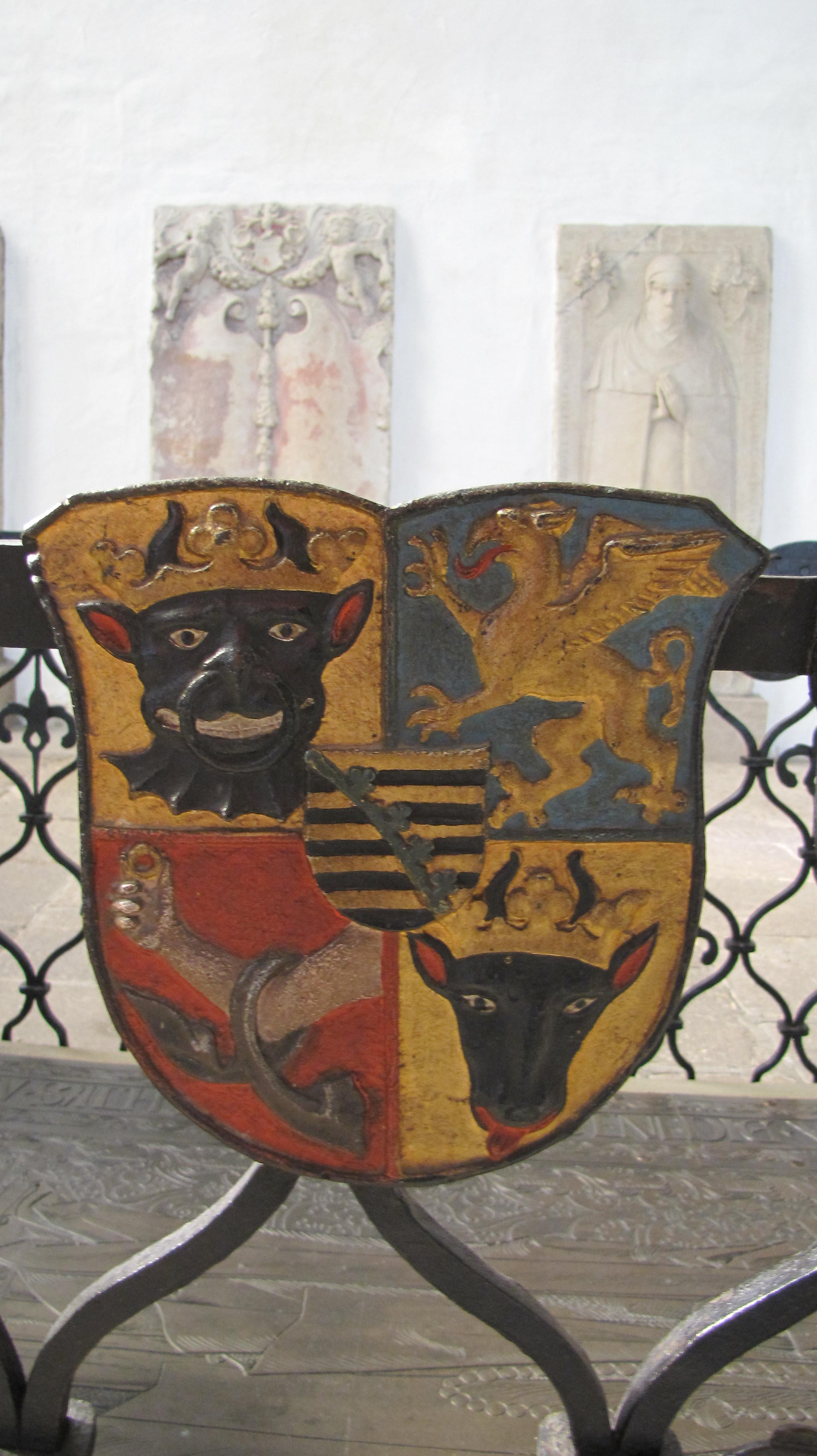
Coat of arms
