= Catherine of Saxe-Lauenburg, Duchess of Mecklenburg =

Catherine of Saxe-Lauenburg
- Born: circa 1400
- Died: 22 September 1450 (aged 49–50)
- Spouse: John VII of Werle John IV, Duke of Mecklenburg (m. 1432)
- Issue: Henry IV, Duke of Mecklenburg; John V, Duke of Mecklenburg
- House: House of Ascania
- Father: Eric IV, Duke of Saxe-Lauenburg
- Mother: Sophia von Braunschweig-Lüneburg

Catherine of Saxe-Lauenburg (c. 1400 – 22 September 1450) was a Baroness consort of Werle-Güstrow, a Duchess consort of Mecklenburg, and Regent of the Duchy of Mecklenburg from 1422 to 1436 as the guardian of her under age sons.

== Life ==
Catherine was the daughter of Eric IV and Sophia of Brunswick-Lüneburg. She married firstly, John VII of Werle. He died in 1414. She then married the Duke John IV of Mecklenburg in 1416. When John died in 1422, after six years of marriage, she ruled until 1436 as Regent for her minor sons.

For a long time, a charter date July 1448 was the last known document to name Catherine. Then a charter surfaced which suggested she died in November. Around the turn of the Century, Hans Witte could finally prove she died on St. Maurice day (22 September) 1450.

== Issue ==
From her marriage with John, Catherine had two sons:

- Henry IV the Fat, Duke of Mecklenburg (1417 to 1477)
- John V, Duke of Mecklenburg (1418–1442)
