= Commandry of Mirow =

Coordinates: 53.2767°N 12.8097°E

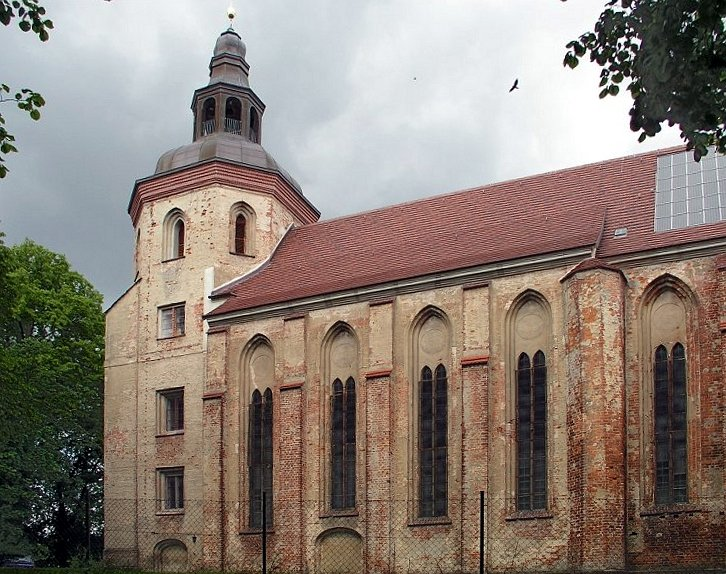
The former commandry church (now the Schlosskirche Mirow).

The Commandry of Mirow was a commandry of the Knights Hospitaller, based in Mirow, a town in Mecklenburg-Vorpommern. It existed from 1226 until 1648.
