= Balthasar, Duke of Mecklenburg =

Balthasar of Mecklenburg
- Born: 1451
- Died: 16 March 1507; Wismar
- Spouse: Margaret of Pomerania
- House: House of Mecklenburg
- Father: Henry IV, Duke of Mecklenburg
- Mother: Dorothea of Brandenburg (1420–1491)

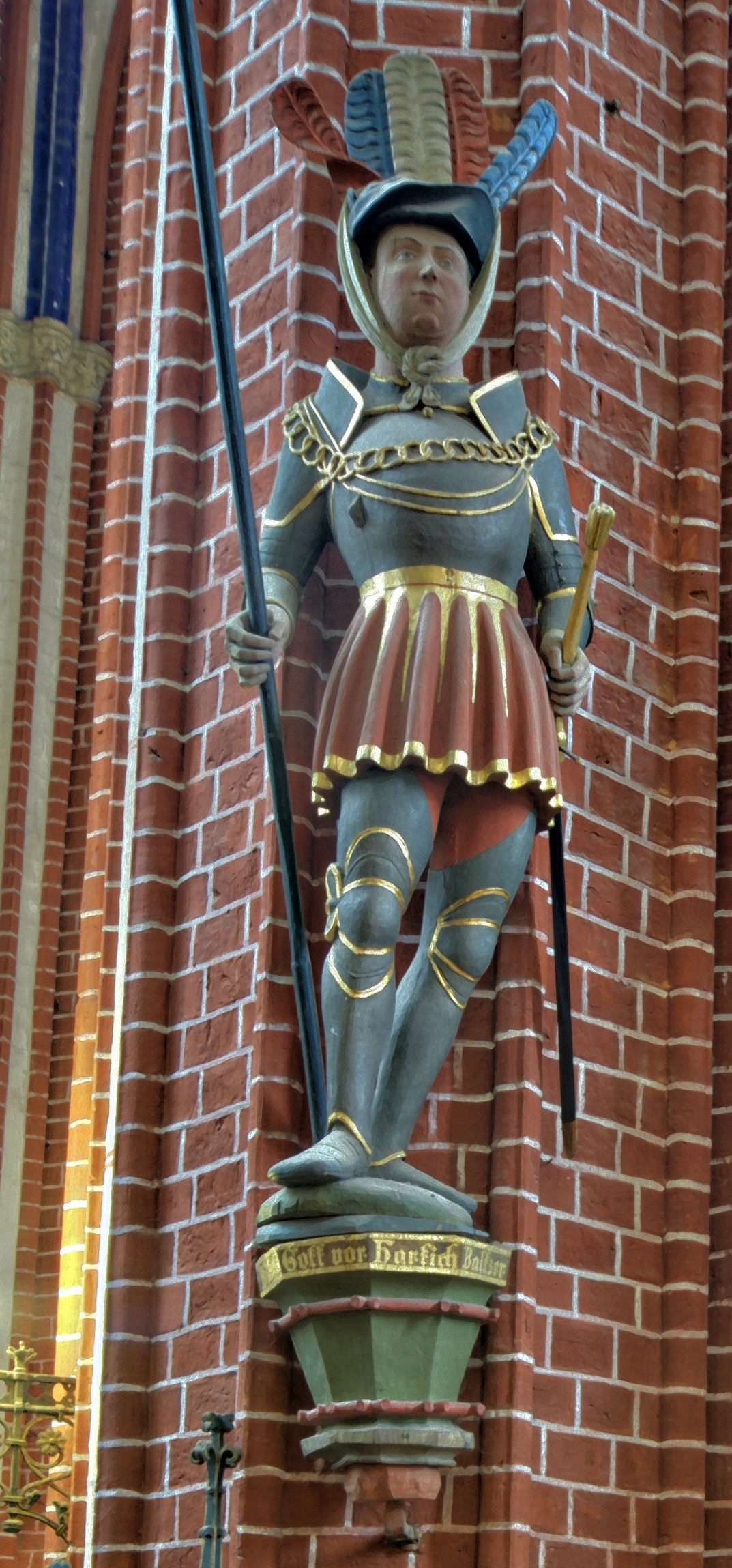

Balthasar of Mecklenburg (1451 – 16 March 1507) was a Duke of Mecklenburg and Coadjutor of the Diocese of Hildesheim between 1471 and 1474 and the Diocese of Schwerin between 1474 and 1479.

Balthasar was the youngest son of Henry IV, Duke of Mecklenburg and Dorothea of Brandenburg, the daughter of the Margrave Frederick I of Brandenburg. When he came of age, Balthasar chose an ecclesiastical career. He was coadjutor of the Diocese of Hildesheim in the years 1471-1474 and then in the Diocese of Schwerin from 1474 to 1479. He probably was not satisfied with ecclesiastical life and returned to lay status in 1479. After mediation by his mother, an agreement was reached on 13 January 1480 between him and his older brothers to divide the duchy. His brother Albert VI received the larger part of the former Principality of Werle, while Balthasar and his brother Magnus II jointly administered the rest of the Duchy. After Magnus died, Balthasar ruled jointly with Magnus' sons.

He married Margaret, daughter of Duke Eric II of Pomerania, in 1487. They had no children. After the deaths of Balthasar and his nephews Eric II, the rule of Mecklenburg was divided among Magnus' surviving sons.

Balthasar was a scholarly man and served as the rector of the University of Rostock three times. He was a promoter of the Dresdner Heldenbuch, created by Kaspar von der Rhön; this support likely influenced Emperor Maximilian I in his support of the Ambraser Heldenbuch, a highly significant manuscript in the history of German literature.

Balthasar died on 16 March 1507 (or, less likely, on 17 March) in Wismar and was buried in the Doberan Abbey in Bad Doberan.

Balthasar, Duke of Mecklenburg House of Mecklenburg Born: 1451 Died: 1507
Regnal titles
Catholic Church titles
Preceded by Werner Wolmer as prince-bishop	Administrator of the Prince-Bischopric of Schwerin; 1474–1479	Succeeded by Nicholas II as prince-bishop
Regnal titles
Preceded by Albert VI and Magnus II of Mecklenburg	Dukes of Mecklenburg-Schwerin; 1479–1507 with Magnus II (brother) (1479–1503); Albert VII (nephew) (1503–1520); Eric II (nephew) (1503–1508); Henry V (nephew) (1503–1520)	Succeeded by Albert VII, Eric II and Henry V of Mecklenburg
Preceded by Albert VI of Mecklenburg-Güstrow in 1483 M.-Güstrow reverted to M.-Schwerin	Dukes of Mecklenburg-Schwerin; 1479–1507 with Magnus II (brother) (1479–1503); Albert VII (nephew) (1503–1520); Eric II (nephew) (1503–1508); Henry V (nephew) (1503–1520)	Succeeded by Albert VII, Eric II and Henry V of Mecklenburg
