= Albert VI of Mecklenburg =

Albert VI, Duke of Mecklenburg
- Mecklenburg coats of arms
- Born: 1438
- Died: 27 April 1483
- Buried: Cathedral in Güstrow
- Noble family: House of Mecklenburg
- Spouse: Catherine of Lindow-Ruppin
- Father: Henry IV, Duke of Mecklenburg
- Mother: Dorothea of Brandenburg

Albert VI, Duke of Mecklenburg (German: Albrecht VI., Herzog zu Mecklenburg; 1438 – before 27 April 1483) was a Duke of Mecklenburg.

Albert was the son of Henry IV, Duke of Mecklenburg, and Dorothea of Brandenburg, the daughter of the Elector Frederick I of Brandenburg. In 1464, he and his brother John VI received from their father the bailiwicks of Güstrow, Plau, Laage and Stavenhagen as a source of income.

Albert was co-regent with his father until his father died in 1477. Thereafter, he was co-regent with his brother Magnus II. In 1479, his brother Balthasar, who had until then been Coadjutor of the Bishopric of Schwerin, also desired to be co-regent of Pomerania. Their mother mediated an agreement to divide the Duchy. Albert received the former Principality of Werle, except for the city of Waren, the city and district of Penzlin, Klein Broda, the city and district of Röbel, Bede, and the bailiwick of Wredenhagen. Magnus II and Balthasar jointly ruled the rest of the Duchy.

Albert died three years later, sometime before 27 April 1483. He was buried in the Cathedral in Güstrow. After his death, the Duchy of Mecklenburg was reunited.

In 1466 or 1468, Albert married Catherine of Lindow-Ruppin. The marriage was childless.

Albert VI of Mecklenburg House of Nikloting Born: 1438 Died: before 27 April 1483
Regnal titles
Preceded by Henry IV	Dukes of Mecklenburg; 1477–1479 with Magnus II (brother) (1477–1479)	Succeeded by Himself as Duke of Mecklenburg-Güstrow
Preceded by Henry IV	Dukes of Mecklenburg; 1477–1479 with Magnus II (brother) (1477–1479)	Succeeded by Balthasar and Magnus II of Mecklenburg-Schwerin
Preceded by Himself and Magnus II of Mecklenburg as Dukes of Mecklenburg	Duke of Mecklenburg-Güstrow in 1483 M.-Güstrow reverted to M.-Schwerin; 1480–1483	Succeeded by Balthasar and Magnus II of Mecklenburg(-Schwerin)
