= Commandry of Nemerow =

Crusader military installation in Germany

Coordinates: 53.4899°N 13.2146°E

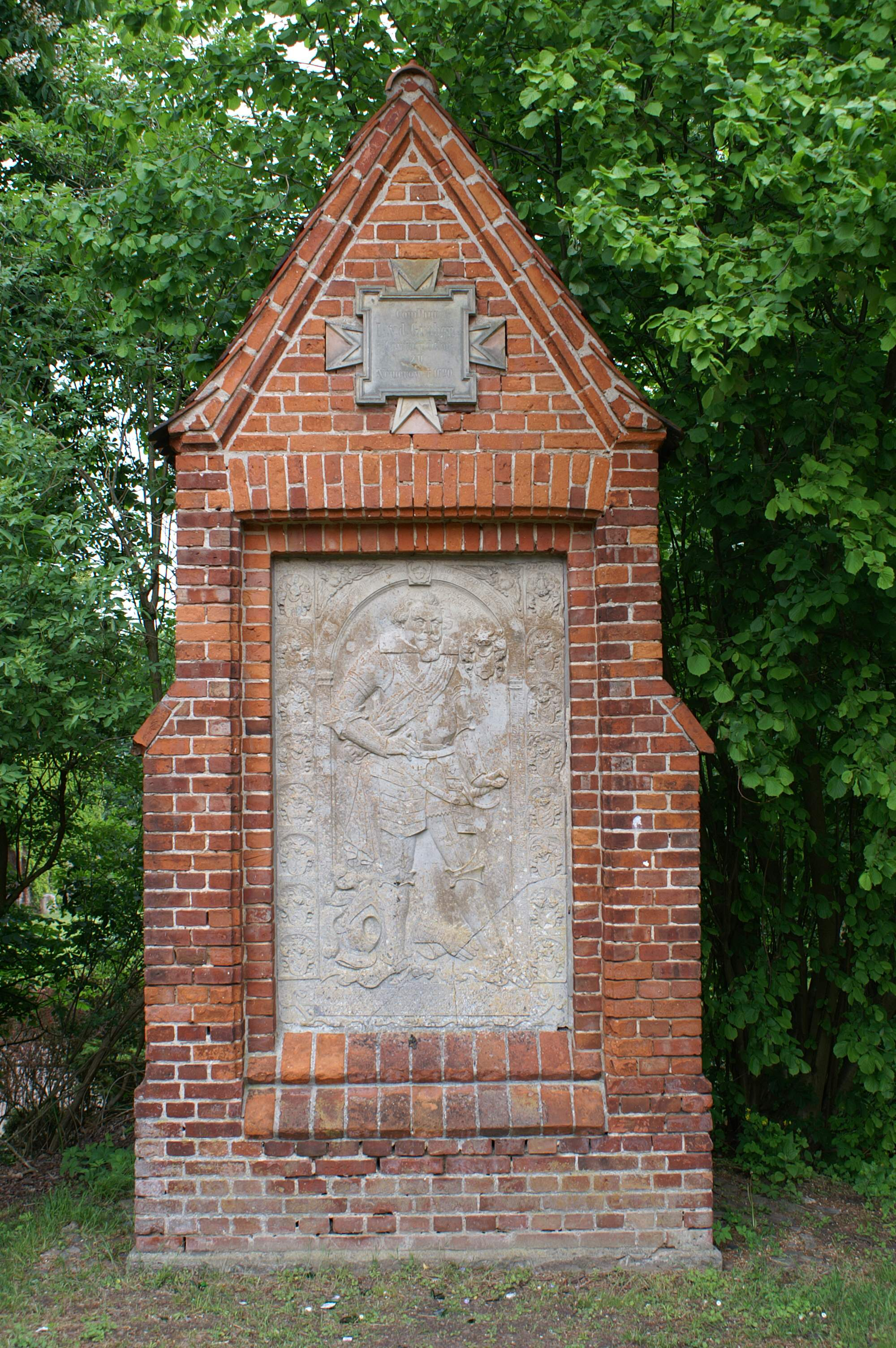
Tombstone of commander Ludwig von der Groeben

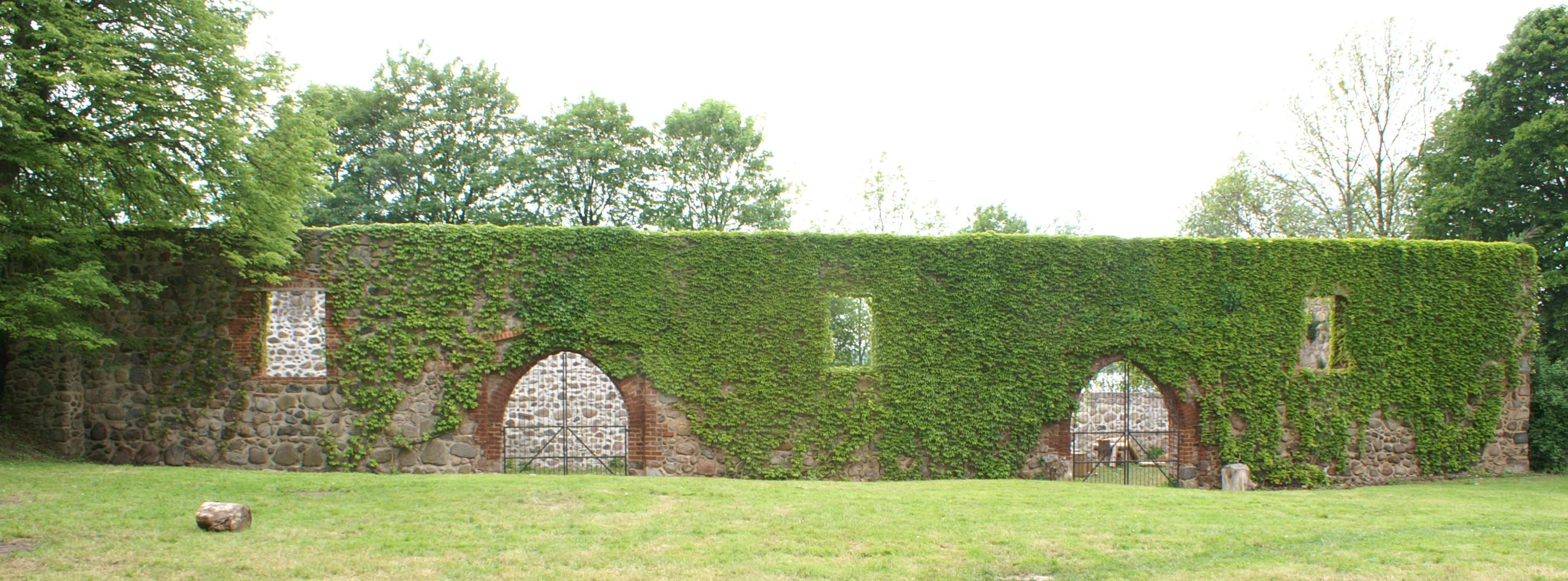
Ruins of the order's barn

The Commandry of Nemerow (German: Komturei Nemerow or Komturei Gardow) was a commandry of the Knights Hospitaller in the village of Klein Nemerow in Mecklenburg-Vorpommern. It existed from 1285 until 1648. It was originally centred on Gardow, a now-ruined village near Wokuhl-Dabelow.
