= Eric II of Mecklenburg =

Joint ruler of Mecklenburg-Schwerin in 1503–1508

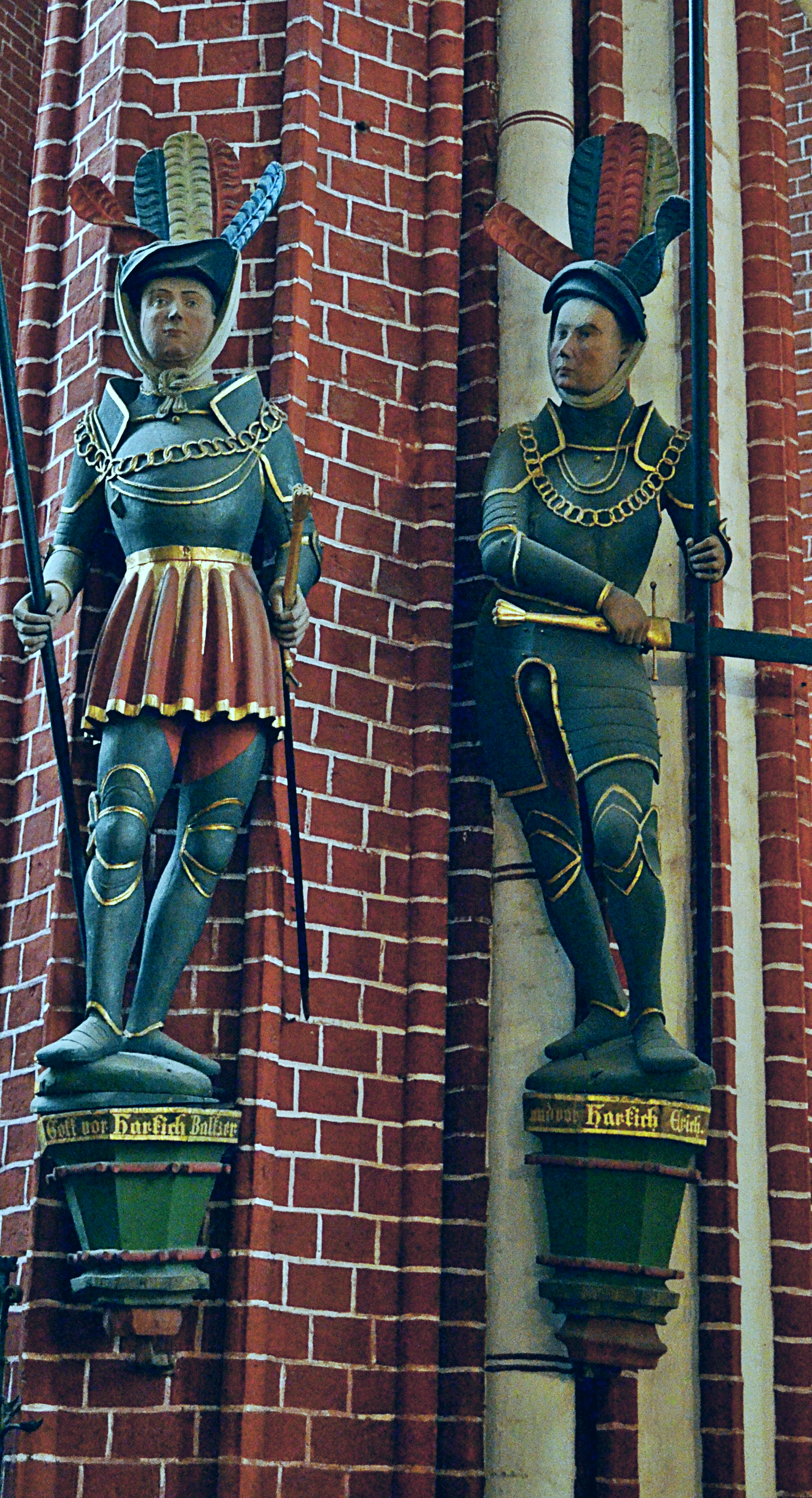
- Eric II (right), statue in Doberan Minster (with his uncle Balthasar)
- Born: 3 September 1483
- Died: 22 December 1508 (aged 25)
- Buried: Doberan Minster
- Noble family: Mecklenburg
- Father: Magnus II, Duke of Mecklenburg
- Mother: Sophie of Pomerania-Stettin

Eric II, Duke of Mecklenburg (German: Erich (II.), Herzog zu Mecklenburg; 3 September 1483 – 21/22 December 1508) was Duke of Mecklenburg, a son of Magnus II, Duke of Mecklenburg, and his wife Sophie of Pomerania-Stettin.

Eric studied in University of Rostock and was an honorary rector of the university three times in 1499, 1499–1500 and 1502. After his father's death on 27 December 1503, he ruled Mecklenburg-Schwerin jointly with his brothers Henry V and Albert VII and his uncle Balthasar. Eric probably died on 21 or 22 December 1508. He was buried in the Doberan Minster in Bad Doberan. He never married and died childless.

Eric II of Mecklenburg House of Mecklenburg Born: 3 September 1483 Died: 21 or 22 December 1508
Regnal titles
Preceded by Balthasar and Magnus II	Dukes of Mecklenburg[-Schwerin] 1503–1508 with Albert VII (brother) (1503–1520); Henry V (brother) (1503–1520); Balthasar (uncle) (1479–1507)	Succeeded by Albert VII and Henry V
