= Henry V of Mecklenburg =

German noble (1479–1552)

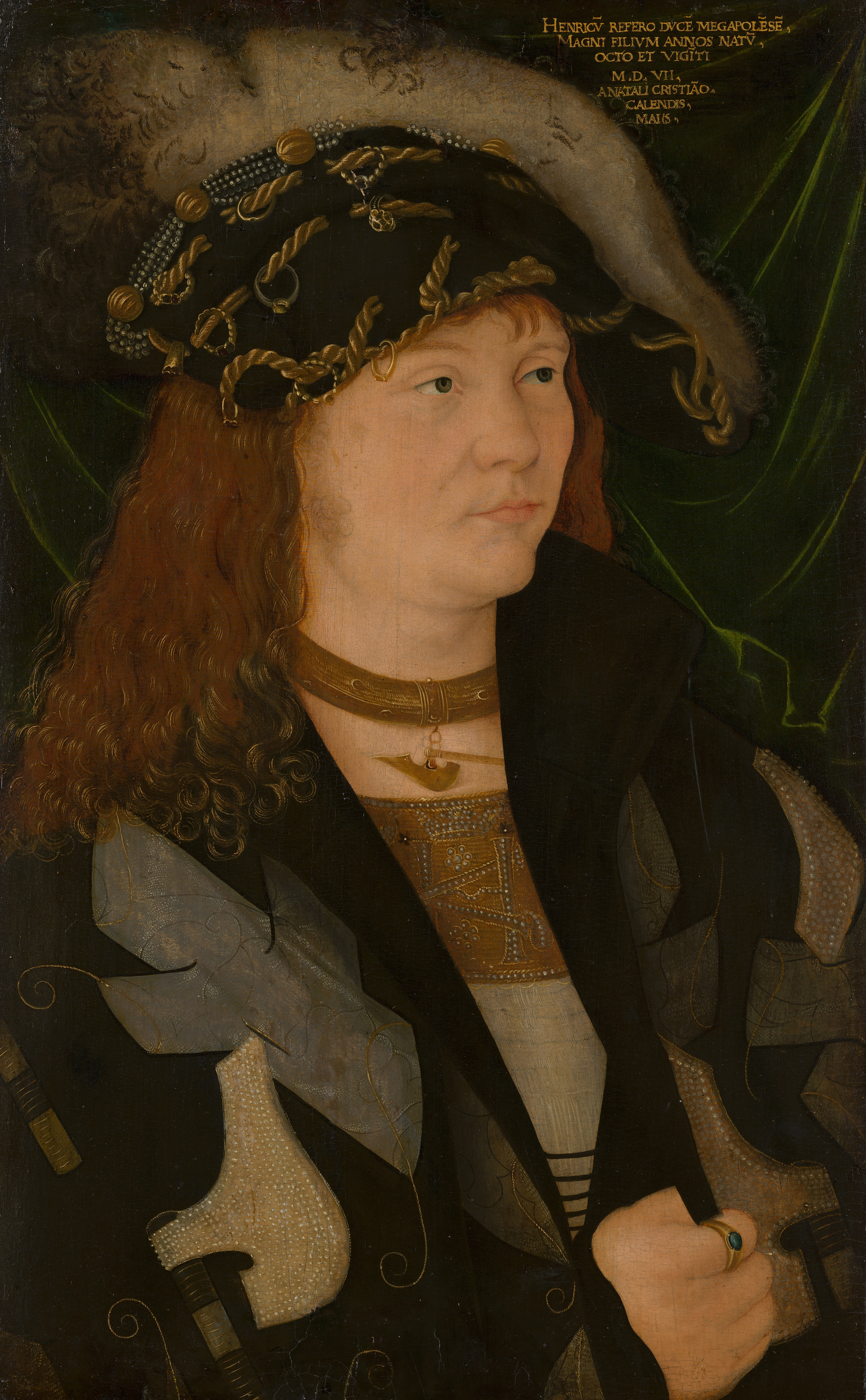
- Portrait by Jacopo de' Barbari, 1507
- Born: 3 May 1479
- Died: 6 February 1552 (aged 72); Schwerin
- Spouse: Ursula of Brandenburg; Helen of the Palatinate; Ursula of Saxe-Lauenburg
- House: House of Mecklenburg
- Father: Magnus II
- Mother: Sophie of Pomerania-Stettin

Henry V, Duke of Mecklenburg, nicknamed the Peaceful (3 May 1479 – 6 February 1552), was the reigning Duke of Mecklenburg in the region Mecklenburg-Schwerin, the son of Duke Magnus II and Sophie of Pomerania-Stettin.

Henry ruled jointly with his brothers Eric II and Albert VII and his uncle Balthasar from 27 December 1503. Balthasar died on 16 March 1507 and Eric on 22 December 1508, both without an heir, thus Henry and Albert came into possession of the whole country. They ruled jointly at first. Albert repeatedly advocated the division of the territories of Mecklenburg, and this was agreed to in the House Treaty of Neubrandenburg, sealed on 7 May 1520. The treaty stipulated that Henry rule in Schwerin and Albert in Güstrow, without a de facto division of the country.

It was during the reign of the brothers Henry and Albert that Martin Luther launched the Reformation, which quickly found supporters in Mecklenburg. Lutheran doctrine was preached there more or less openly as early as 1523 and perhaps even earlier. Duke Henry supported the new doctrine from the beginning, at first in a very cautious manner, and but more openly after the Diet of Augsburg in 1530. He corresponded with Luther beginning in 1524, and Luther sent him teachers and preachers.

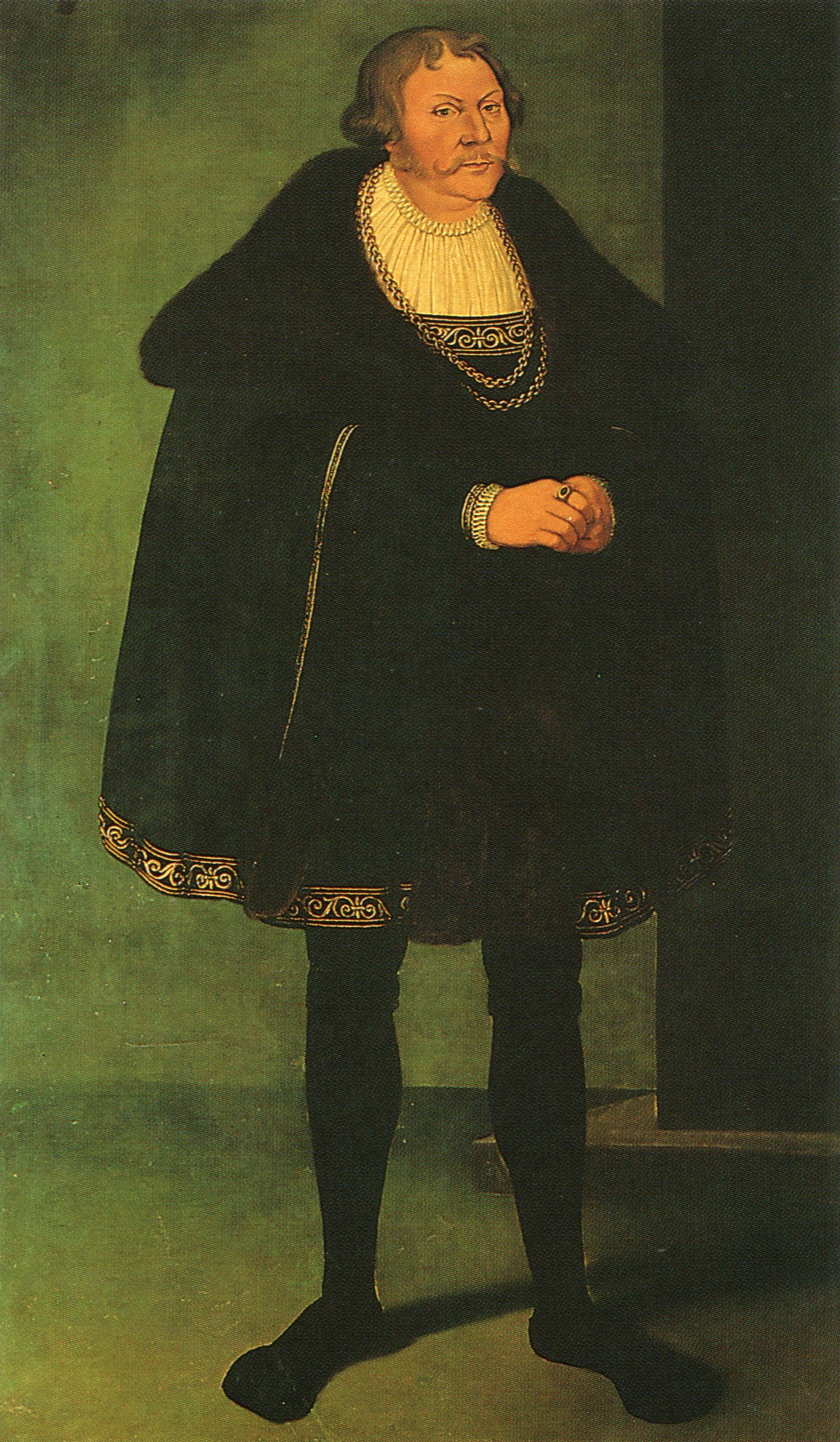
19th-century painting of Henry V by Theodor Fischer

Henry joined the League of Torgau on 12 June 1526, and in 1532 he finally came out publicly as a supporter of Luther. Naturally, his position led him to give the new doctrine a firm external and internal organization, so he asked Superintendent Johann Riebling, whom Luther had recommended to him in 1537, to draft a Church Order, a Catechism and an Agenda. For the remainder of his reign, he was occupied with the organization of the Lutheran church.

After Luther's death, a religious war erupted in Germany. Henry, however, did not participate; although he was a Protestant prince, he was not a member of the Schmalkaldic League. He resisted the introduction of the Augsburg Interim by Emperor Charles V in 1548. Henry approved the decision of the Mecklenburg estates of July 1549 that formally recognized the Lutheran doctrine. Soon after, on 6 February 1552, he died with the reputation of a pious and peaceable prince.

== Marriages and offspring ==
Henry was married three times. He first married Ursula of Brandenburg (17 October 1488 – 18 September 1510), daughter of the elector John II Cicero of Brandenburg, on 12 December 1505. They had three children together:

- Magnus (1509–1550), Duke of Mecklenburg-Schwerin, Administrator of the Prince-Bishopric of Schwerin, and from 1532 Bishop of Schwerin.
- Sophie (1508–1541), who married Duke Ernest of Brunswick-Lüneburg.
- Ursula († 1586), last abbess of the Poor Clares monastery at Ribnitz.

Henry's second marriage, on 12 June 1513, was to Helen of the Palatinate (1493 – 4 August 1524), daughter of Philipp, Elector Palatine. They also had three children together:

- Philip (1514–1557), Duke of Mecklenburg-Schwerin
- Margaret (died 1586), who married Duke Henry II, Duke of Münsterberg-Oels.
- Catherine (died 1586), who married Frederick III, Duke of Legnica.

His third marriage (concluded on 14 May 1551) was to Ursula (died after 1565), daughter of Magnus I, Duke of Saxe-Lauenburg, and his wife Catherine of Brunswick-Wolfenbüttel, Duchess of Saxe-Lauenburg. This marriage was childless.

Henry V of Mecklenburg House of Mecklenburg Born: 3 May 1479 Died: 6 February 1552
Preceded by Balthasar and Magnus II of Mecklenburg	Dukes of Mecklenburg; 1503–1520 with Albert VII (brother) (1503–1520); Eric II (brother) (1503–1508); Balthasar (uncle) (1479–1507)	Succeeded by Albert VII of Mecklenburg-Güstrow
Preceded by Balthasar and Magnus II of Mecklenburg	Dukes of Mecklenburg; 1503–1520 with Albert VII (brother) (1503–1520); Eric II (brother) (1503–1508); Balthasar (uncle) (1479–1507)	Succeeded by himself as Duke of Mecklenburg-Schwerin
Preceded by Albert VII and himself as Dukes of Mecklenburg	Duke of Mecklenburg-Schwerin; 1520–1552	Succeeded by John Albert I of Mecklenburg-Schwerin
