= John VI of Mecklenburg =

John VI, Duke of Mecklenburg
- Born: 1439
- Died: 1474 (aged 34–35); Kulmbach
- Buried: Poor Clares monastery in Hof
- Noble family: House of Mecklenburg
- Father: Henry IV, Duke of Mecklenburg
- Mother: Dorothea of Brandenburg

John VI, Duke of Mecklenburg (1439–1474) was a Duke of Mecklenburg.

== Life ==
John was the second son of Henry IV, Duke of Mecklenburg, and his wife Dorothea, daughter of Elector Frederick I of Brandenburg.

His earliest documented official act (jointly with the father) was in 1451. In 1464 he ruled an apanage of several districts jointly with his brother Albert VI, but did not participate actively in administering them.

In 1472, John VI was engaged to Sophie, the daughter of Duke Eric II of Pomerania. The marriage was set to be celebrated in 1474. However, John VI died before the marriage took place. The exact date of his death is unknown; he is last mentioned in a document dated 20 May 1474.

His last illness was contracted on a journey to Franconia to visit his uncle Elector Albrecht III Achilles of Brandenburg. In Kulmbach, he was infected with the plague and died. He was probably buried in Poor Clares monastery in Hof.
