= Doberan Abbey =

Former Cistercian monastery

Coordinates: 54°06′29″N 11°54′36″E

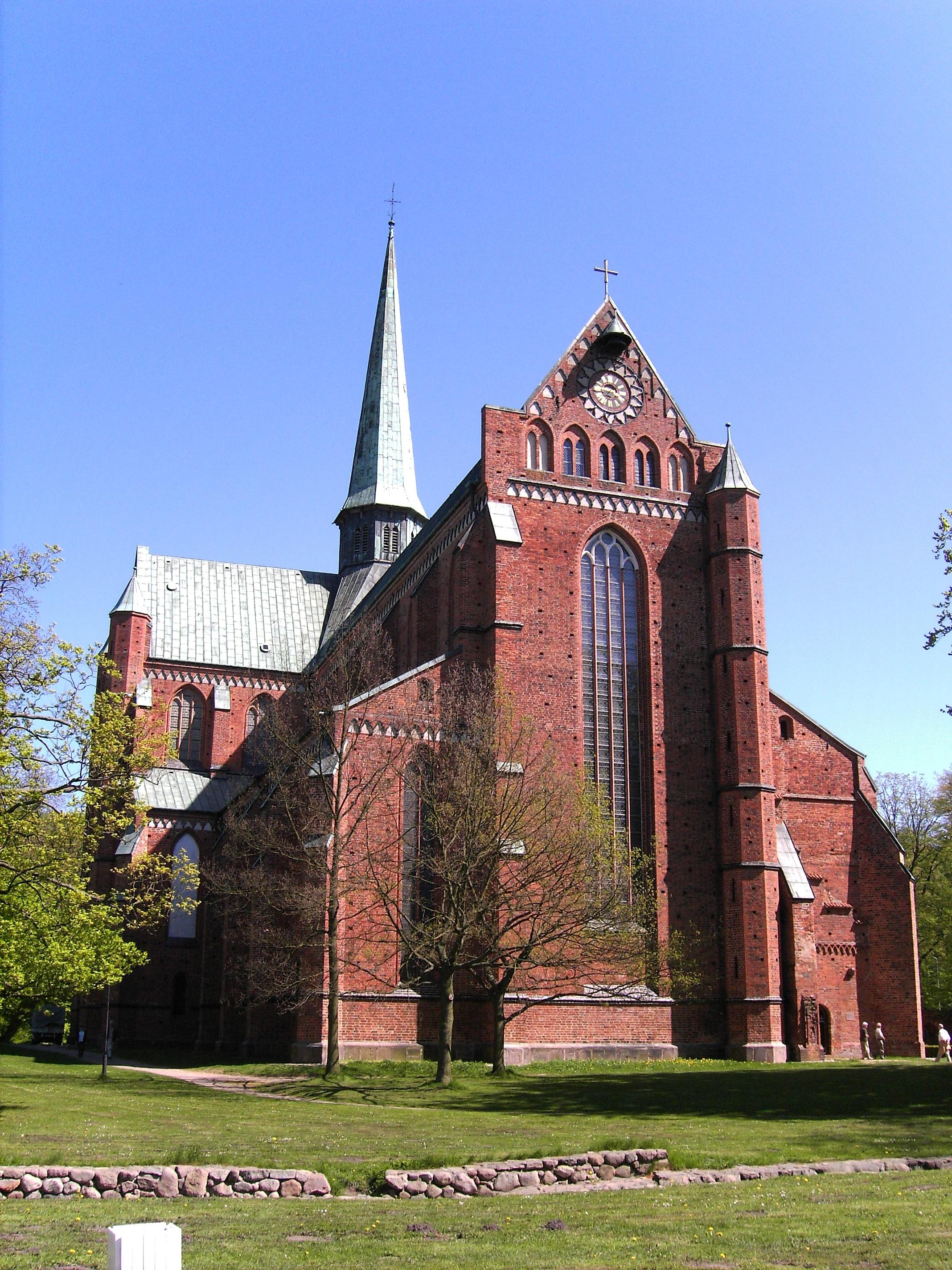
Doberan Minster, west front

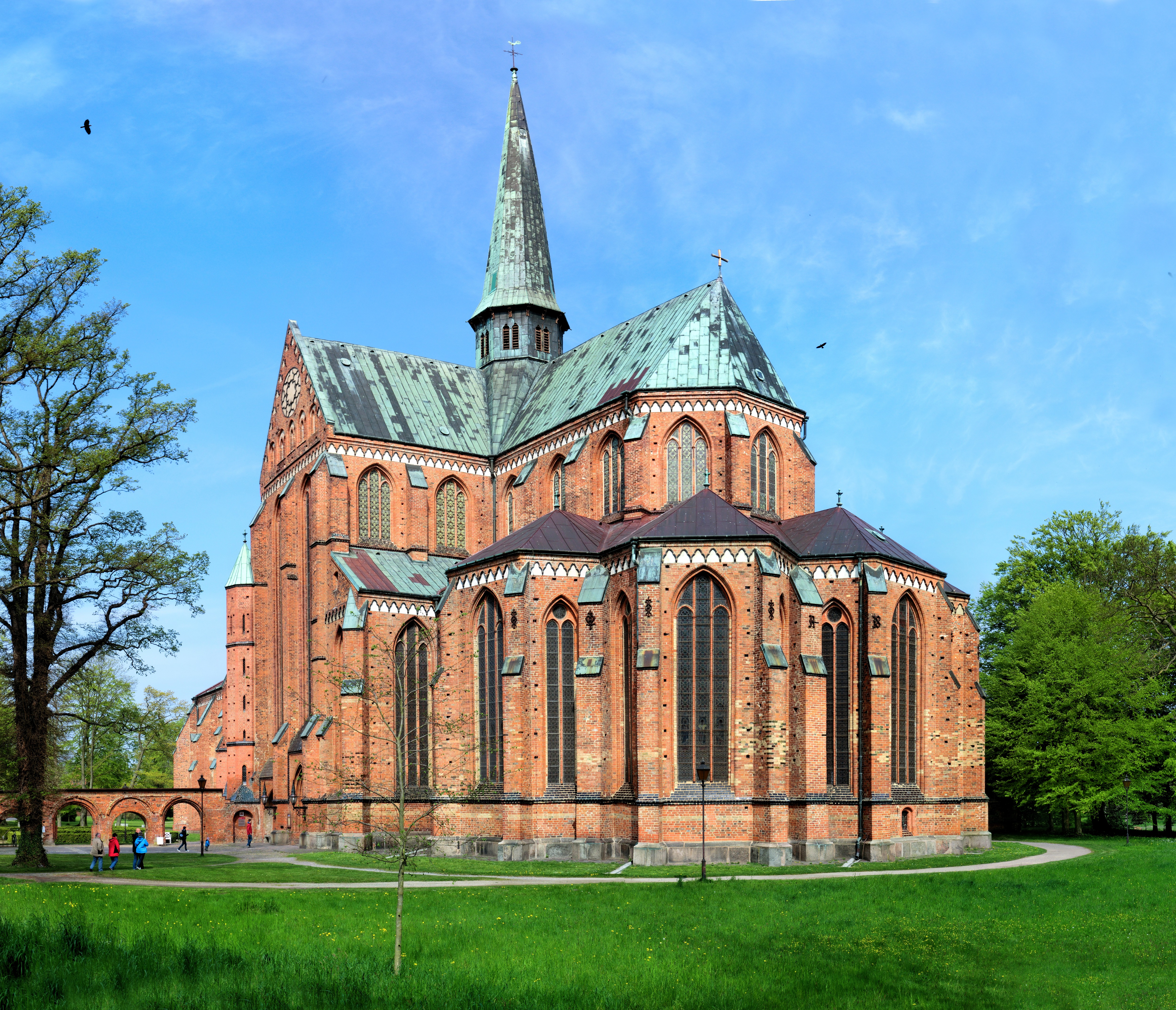
Doberan Minster, east front

Doberan Abbey (Kloster Doberan) is a former Cistercian monastery in Bad Doberan, Mecklenburg-Vorpommern, Germany. The Brick Gothic church continues in use as Doberan Minster (Doberaner Münster).

After the conversion to Christianity of the Wendish prince Pribislav, Doberan was the first monastery founded in Mecklenburg, in 1171, as a daughter house of Amelungsborn Abbey. The abbey was refounded at Doberan in 1186 after the original community, at Althof, was killed in 1179 during the upheaval after Pribislaw's death. It quickly became a political, social and spiritual centre in the region. The abbey church, which continues in use as Doberan Minster (Doberaner Münster), is one of the most important Brick Gothic buildings in Mecklenburg-Vorpommern. Until the Reformation, during which it was secularised in 1552, the abbey possessed great estates, and was the burial place of the Princes of Mecklenburg.

The premises was badly damaged in 1637 during the Thirty Years' War, when the minster was used as a storage depot, and some buildings were destroyed. During the French occupation of Mecklenburg under Napoleon from 1806 to 1813 more damage was sustained, and the church was again used as an ammunition dump. Between 1883 and 1896 the church was "restored" in an inappropriate 19th century Gothic Revival style, which was undone in a further restoration in the 1960s and 1970s.

== Burials ==
- Albert of Sweden
- Margaret Sambiria
- Magnus II, Duke of Mecklenburg
