= Duchess Louise Charlotte of Mecklenburg-Schwerin =

Duchess Louise Charlotte
- Hereditary Princess of Saxe-Gotha-Altenburg
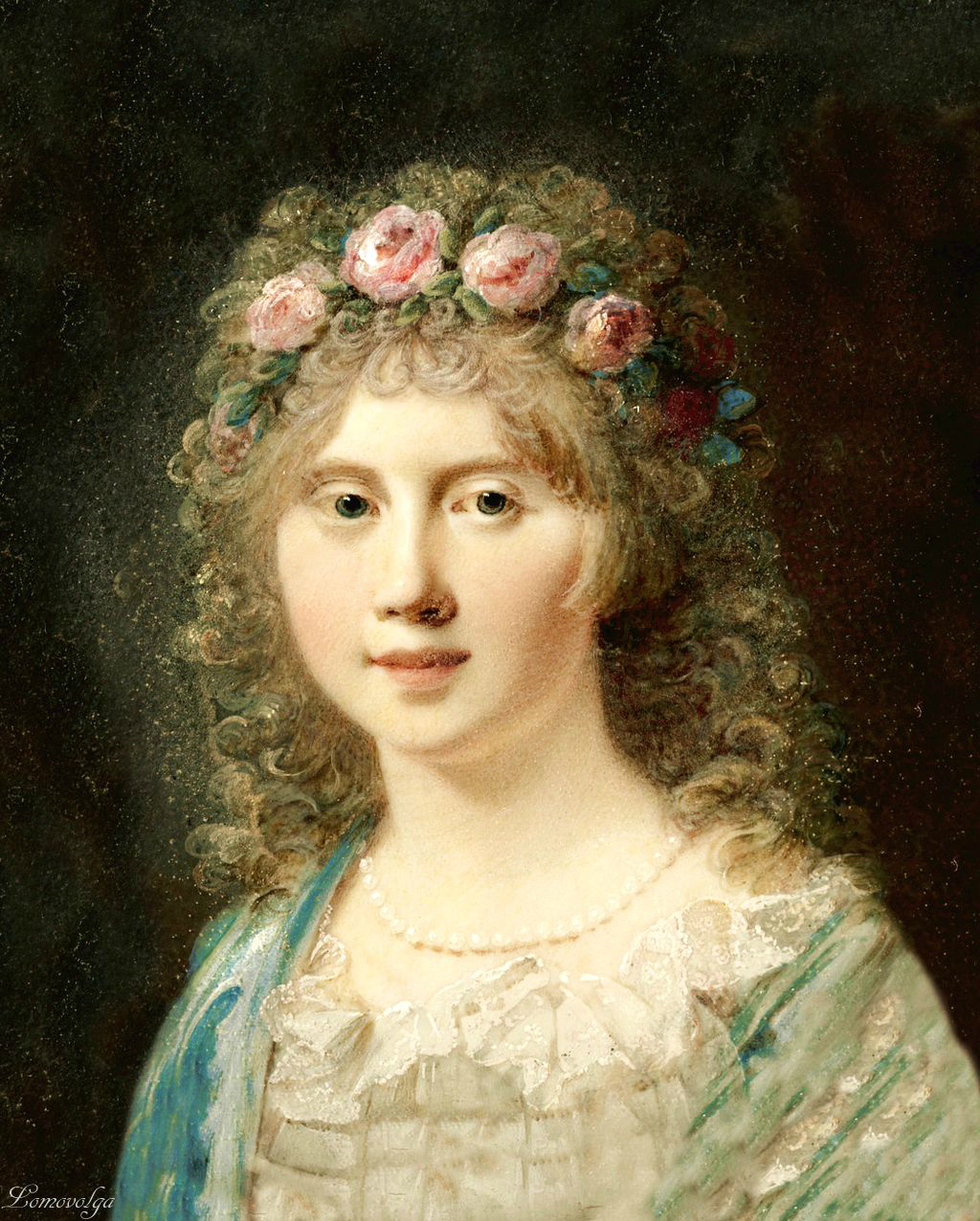
- Louise Charlotte in 1799
- Born: 19 November 1779; Duchy of Mecklenburg-Schwerin, Germany
- Died: 4 January 1801 (aged 21); Gotha, Germany
- Spouse: Augustus, Hereditary Prince of Saxe-Altenburg (m. 1797)
- Issue: Louise, Duchess of Saxe-Coburg-Saalfeld
- House: Mecklenburg-Schwerin
- Father: Frederick Francis I, Grand Duke of Mecklenburg-Schwerin
- Mother: Princess Louise of Saxe-Gotha-Altenburg

Duchess Louise Charlotte of Mecklenburg-Schwerin (19 November 1779 – 4 January 1801) was the maternal grandmother of Prince Albert, husband of Queen Victoria of the United Kingdom.

Louise Charlotte was born Duchess of Mecklenburg-Schwerin, her father being Friedrich Franz I, Grand Duke of Mecklenburg-Schwerin. Her mother was Princess Louise of Saxe-Gotha-Altenburg; her sister Charlotte of Mecklenburg-Schwerin (1784–1840) married King Christian VIII of Denmark.

== Early life ==
Born on 19 November 1779 in the Duchy of Mecklenburg-Schwerin, Duchess Louise Charlotte was the second child and eldest surviving daughter of Frederick Francis I, Grand Duke of Mecklenburg-Schwerin, and his wife, Princess Louise of Saxe-Gotha-Altenburg.

She grew up and was raised at her parents' court in Mecklenburg, alongside her siblings. She enjoyed a rather more informal childhood than was usual for royal children during the time.

== Gustav IV ==
On 1 November 1795, Louise Charlotte was engaged to King Gustav IV Adolf of Sweden, the son of Gustav III of Sweden and Sophia Magdalena of Denmark. The engagement was arranged by Gustaf Adolf Reuterholm, the de facto regent of Sweden, who wished to keep his influence after the monarch was declared of legal majority by having a queen indebted to him for her position. The king himself was initially positive; the engagement was celebrated in the courts of Sweden and Mecklenburg, and Louise Charlotte was mentioned in the official church prayer in Sweden. Empress Catherine the Great, however, wished her granddaughter Grand Duchess Alexandra Pavlovna of Russia to be Queen of Sweden, and displayed dislike of the engagement. Catherine herself wrote:

Let the regent hate me, let him look for an opportunity and deceive me – good luck! – But why does he marry the King with that plain and ugly girl [Louise Charlotte]? How did the King deserve such cruel punishment, while he was thinking to marry the Grand Duchess, whose beauty is talked about by everyone with one voice?

Upon this many people told the king that Louise Charlotte, whom he had not seen, was not beautiful. About the same period, the monarch also fell in love with Ebba Modée. When the king was declared of legal majority in 1796, he broke off his engagement to Louise Charlotte. Her father demanded compensation. In 1803, the matter was settled when the Swedish city of Wismar in Germany was turned over to Mecklenburg-Schwerin by a treaty signed in Malmö.

== Marriage ==
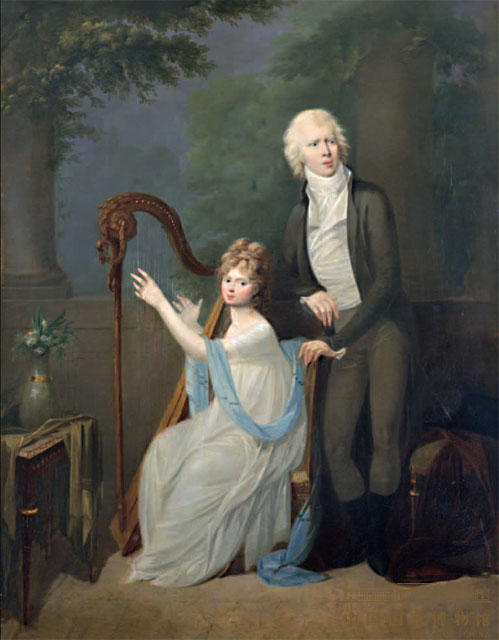
Louise Charlotte, Hereditary Princess of Saxe-Gotha-Altenburg and her husband, by Alexander Molinari, Galerie Neue Meister, Dresden.

In Ludwigslust on 21 October 1797 Louise Charlotte married Augustus, Hereditary Prince of Saxe-Gotha-Altenburg, a second cousin on her mother's side. Their common ancestor was Frederick II, Duke of Saxe-Gotha-Altenburg (1676–1732). The marriage was arranged against her will and was an unhappy one: her spouse abused her and she wished to leave him, but was forced by her family to stay. She was described as very blond, not attractive, somewhat hunchbacked but also as witty, talented, cultivated and with a pleasant manner, though more open than what was regarded as ideal for the period.

Three years later, on 21 December 1800 in Friedenstein Castle around 12.45 p.m. the Hereditary Princess of Saxe-Gotha-Altenburg gave birth to her only child, a daughter, named Louise after her; this daughter later became the wife of Ernst I, Duke of Saxe-Coburg and Gotha, and mother to Prince Albert, Prince Consort of Queen Victoria. However, she never recovered from childbirth and died eleven days later, on 1 January 1801 at the age of 21, before Augustus assumed the throne of Saxe-Gotha-Altenburg.

== Ancestry ==
Ancestors of Duchess Louise Charlotte of Mecklenburg-Schwerin

8. Christian Ludwig II, Duke of Mecklenburg-Schwerin
4. Duke Louis of Mecklenburg-Schwerin
9. Duchess Gustave Caroline of Mecklenburg-Strelitz
2. Frederick Francis I, Grand Duke of Mecklenburg-Schwerin
10. Francis Josias, Duke of Saxe-Coburg-Saalfeld
5. Princess Charlotte Sophie of Saxe-Coburg-Saalfeld
11. Princess Anna Sophie of Schwarzburg-Rudolstadt
1. Louise Charlotte of Mecklenburg-Schwerin
12. Frederick II, Duke of Saxe-Gotha-Altenburg
6. Prince John August of Saxe-Gotha-Altenburg
13. Princess Magdalena Augusta of Anhalt-Zerbst
3. Princess Louise of Saxe-Gotha-Altenburg
14. Heinrich I, Count Reuss of Schleiz
7. Countess Louise Reuss of Schleiz
15. Countess Juliana Dorothea Louise of Löwenstein-Wertheim-Virneburg
