= Princess Louise of Saxe-Gotha-Altenburg (1800–1831) =

German princess

Louise of Saxe-Gotha-Altenburg
- Countess of Pölzig and Beiersdorf
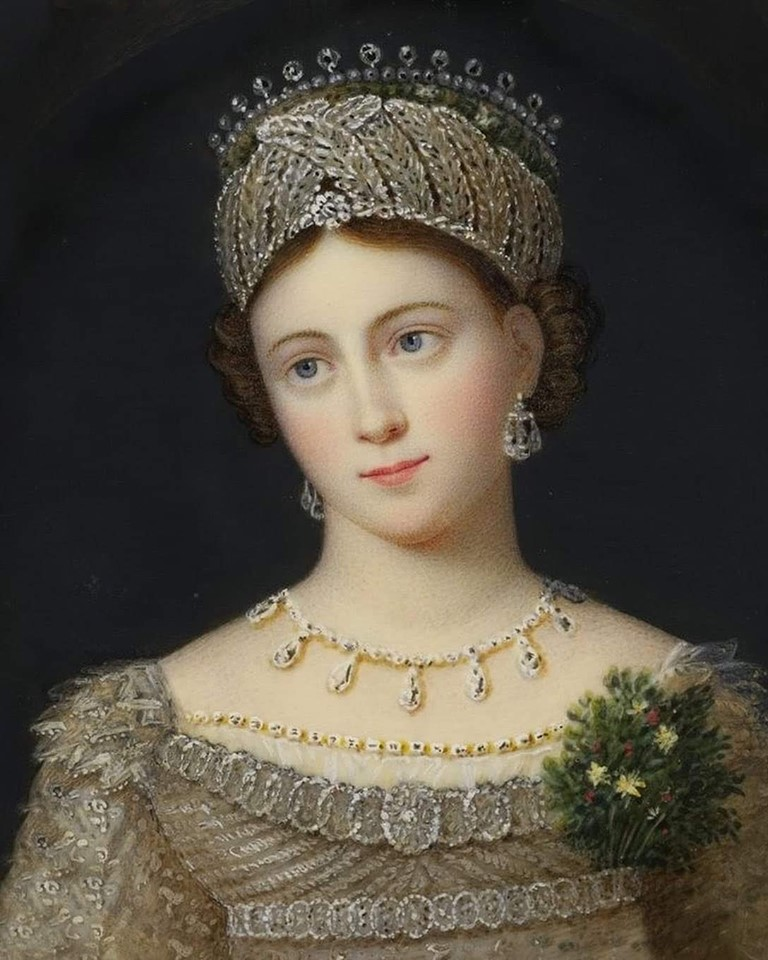

Duchess consort of Saxe-Coburg-Saalfeld
- Tenure: 31 July 1817 – 31 March 1826
- Born: 21 December 1800; Gotha, Saxe-Gotha-Altenburg, Holy Roman Empire
- Died: 30 August 1831 (aged 30); Paris, France
- Burial: Ducal family mausoleum, Friedhof am Glockenberg, Coburg
- Spouses: Ernst III, Duke of Saxe-Coburg-Saalfeld (m. 1817; div. 1826) Alexander von Hanstein, Count of Pölzig and Beiersdorf (m. 1826)
- Issue: Ernest II, Duke of Saxe-Coburg and Gotha; Albert, Prince Consort of the United Kingdom
Names
- Louise Dorothea Pauline Charlotte Fredericka Auguste
- House: Saxe-Gotha-Altenburg
- Father: Augustus, Duke of Saxe-Gotha-Altenburg
- Mother: Louise Charlotte of Mecklenburg-Schwerin

Louise of Saxe-Gotha-Altenburg (Louise Dorothea Pauline Charlotte Fredericka Auguste, 21 December 1800 – 30 August 1831) was the wife of Ernst I, Duke of Saxe-Coburg-Saalfeld (later of Saxe-Coburg and Gotha) and the mother of Duke Ernst II and Prince Albert, husband of Queen Victoria.

== Family ==
Princess Louise was the only child of Augustus, Duke of Saxe-Gotha-Altenburg and his first wife Louise Charlotte of Mecklenburg-Schwerin, daughter of Frederick Francis I, Grand Duke of Mecklenburg-Schwerin and Princess Louise of Saxe-Gotha-Altenburg (her namesake). She lost her mother only 11 days after her birth and grew up in Gotha at the court of her father and his second wife Karoline Amalie von Hesse-Kassel.

== Marriage and issue ==
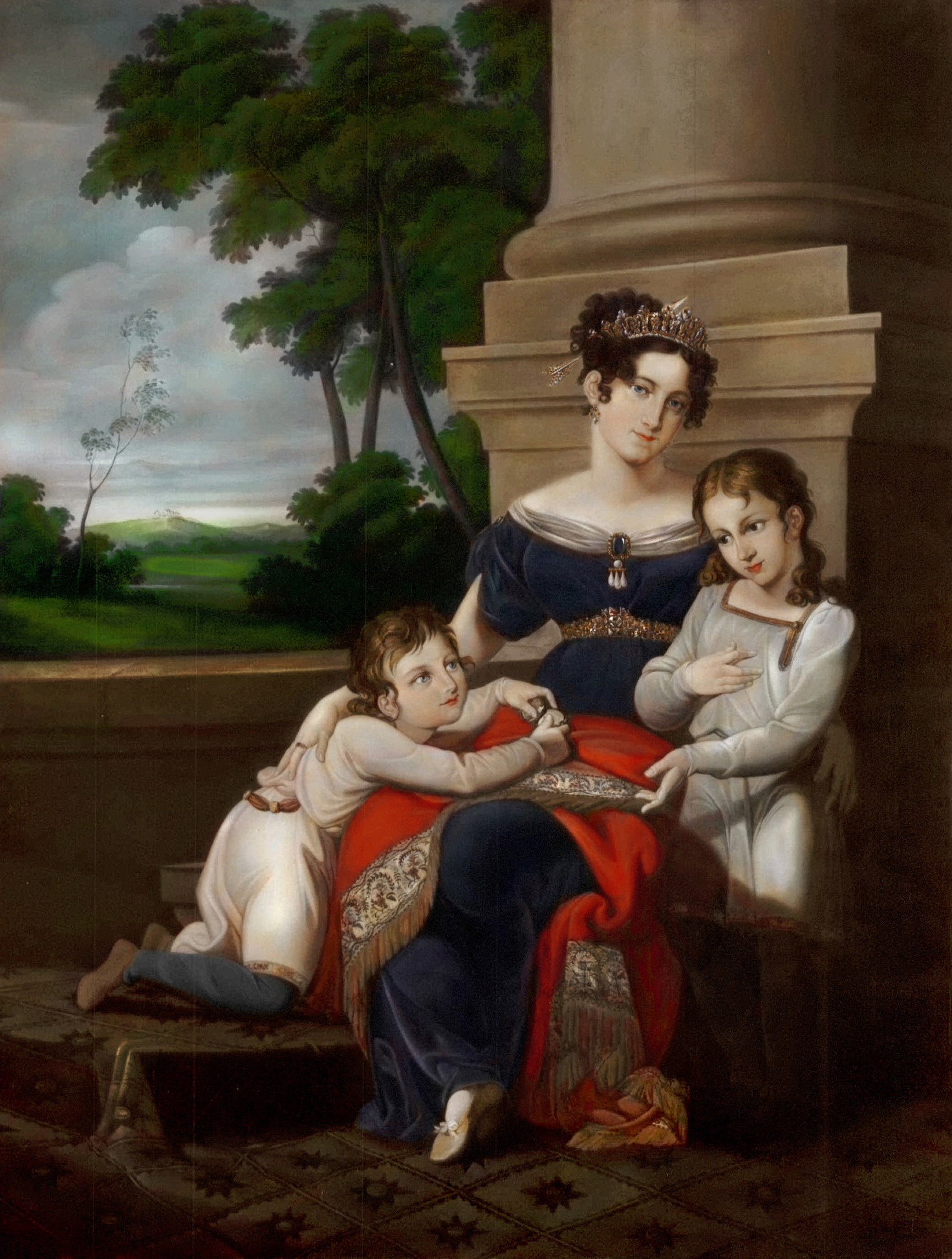
Princess Louise with her two sons Ernst (right) and Albert, shortly before her exile from court in 1824.

The engagement to the then Duke Ernst I of Saxe-Coburg-Saalfeld took place on December 20, 1816. On 31 July 1817 in Gotha, 16-year-old Louise married her 33-year-old kinsman Ernst III, Duke of Saxe-Coburg-Saalfeld, (later Ernst I, Duke of Saxe-Coburg and Gotha), after he failed to win the hand of one of the Russian Grand Duchesses. Louise was considered "young, clever, and beautiful".

Their marriage, which was obviously arranged for political reasons, began to fall into crisis after the birth of their first son, Ernst, who inherited his father's lands and titles, and a year later her second son Albert was born.

The succession secured, no further children were born between the couple and they grew apart. Both parties engaged in scandalous infidelity, Ernst had several mistresses, and Louise had an affair with chamberlain Gottfried von Bülow in 1823, and a liaison with traveling stable master Maximilian Alexander von Hanstein in the summer of 1824. Shortly after, the couple separated. Sankt Wendel, in the Principality of Lichtenberg, was assigned as her new residence, and Louise was forced to leave her two sons behind. Biographer Lytton Strachey noted in 1921: "The ducal court was not noted for the strictness of its morals; the Duke was a man of gallantry, and it was rumored that the Duchess followed her husband's example. There were scandals: one of the Court Chamberlains, a charming and cultivated man of Jewish extraction, was talked of; at last there was a separation, followed by a divorce."

== Post-divorce ==
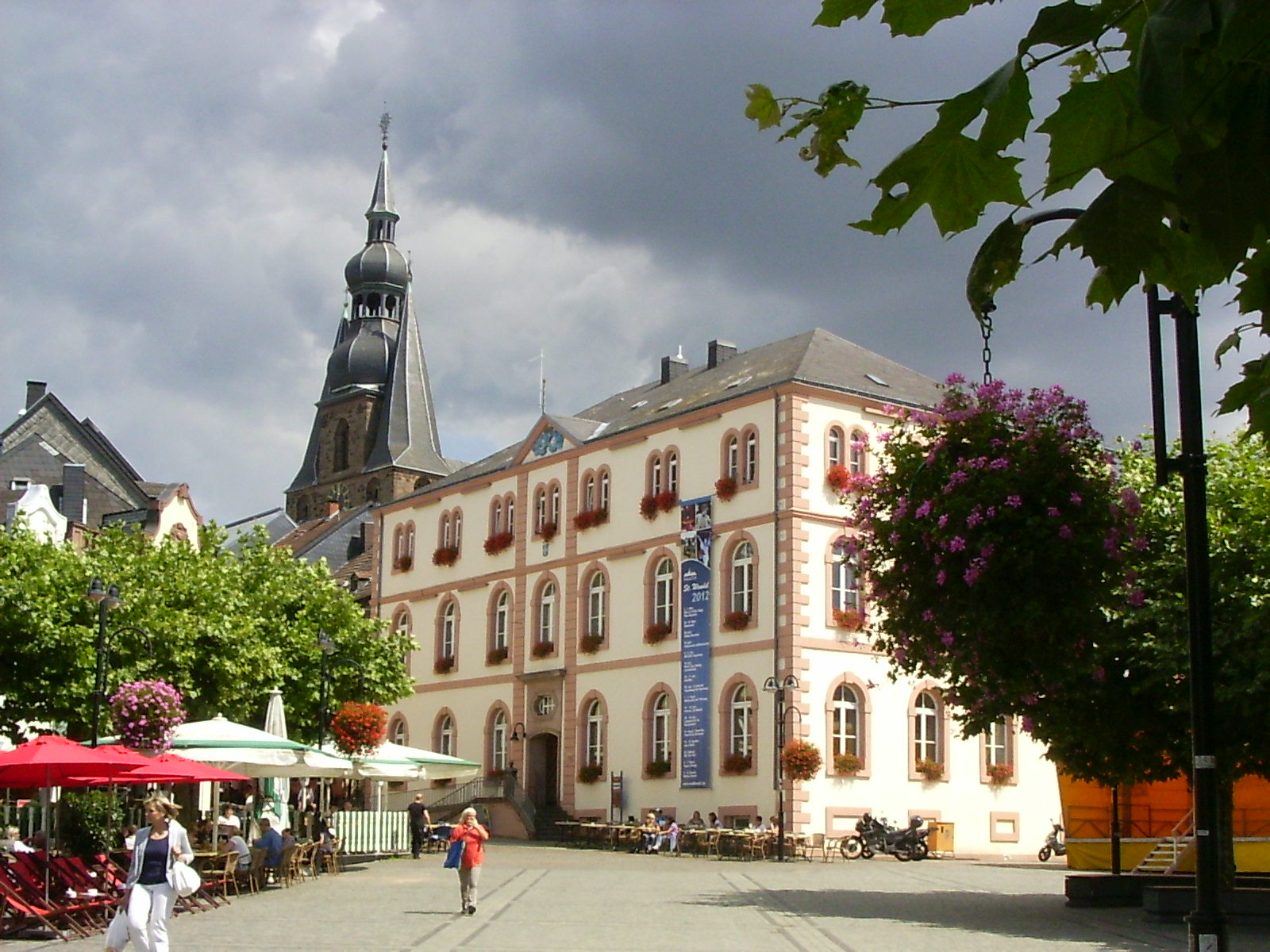
Residence of the Princess Louise of Saxe-Gotha-Altenburg in Sankt Wendel, Saarland

On 31 March 1826 their marriage was officially dissolved. Seven months later, on 18 October 1826, Louise secretly married in Sankt Wendel her former lover, the Baron Alexander von Hanstein. On 19 July 1826 Alexander was additionally created Count of Pölzig and Beiersdorf by Frederick, Duke of Saxe-Altenburg.

During her previous marriage, she had taken great interest in the social life of the principality and was revered as its Landesmutter (literally, "mother of the region"). Nevertheless, this happy life ended in February 1831, when her secret marriage to Alexander von Hanstein was discovered and she lost her children permanently.

Louise set up house in St Wendel with Count Alexander von Hanstein. Any happiness was short-lived as Louise began to suffer from severe stomach pain. The couple traveled to Paris to consult a reputable doctor, but in August 1831 she collapsed in their home in St Wendel.

== Death ==
Louise died of cancer on 30 August 1831 at the age of 30. Years after her death, Queen Victoria described Louise in an 1864 memorandum: "The princess is described as having been very handsome, though very small; fair, with blue eyes; and Prince Albert is said to have been extremely like her".

Louise was reinterred from her initial burial site at Morizkirche to the ducal mausoleum at Friedhof am Glockenberg after it had been completed in 1859.

== Ancestry ==
Ancestors of Princess Louise of Saxe-Gotha-Altenburg (1800–1831)

8. Frederick III, Duke of Saxe-Gotha-Altenburg
4. Ernest II, Duke of Saxe-Gotha-Altenburg
9. Princess Luise Dorothea of Saxe-Meiningen
2. Augustus, Duke of Saxe-Gotha-Altenburg
10. Anton Ulrich, Duke of Saxe-Meiningen
5. Princess Charlotte of Saxe-Meiningen
11. Princess Charlotte Amalie of Hesse-Philippsthal
1. Princess Louise of Saxe-Gotha-Altenburg
12. Duke Louis of Mecklenburg-Schwerin
6. Frederick Francis I, Grand Duke of Mecklenburg-Schwerin
13. Princess Charlotte Sophie of Saxe-Coburg-Saalfeld
3. Duchess Louise Charlotte of Mecklenburg-Schwerin
14. Prince John August of Saxe-Gotha-Altenburg
7. Princess Louise of Saxe-Gotha-Altenburg
15. Countess Luise Reuss of Schleiz

== Sources ==
- Grey, Hon. Charles (1868). The Early Years of His Royal Highness The Prince Consort. New York: Harper & Brothers Publishers. "The Early Years of His Royal Highness The Prince Consort."
- Weintraub, Stanley (1997). Uncrowned King: The Life of Prince Albert. London: John Murray Inc. ISBN 0-7195-5756-9.

Princess Louise of Saxe-Gotha-Altenburg (1800–1831) House of Saxe-Gotha-Altenburg Cadet branch of the House of Wettin Born: 21 December 1800 Died: 16 November 1831
German royalty
Vacant Title last held by Augusta Reuss of Ebersdorf	Duchess consort of Saxe-Coburg-Saalfeld; 31 July 1817 – 31 March 1826	Succeeded by Duchess Marie of Württemberg as Duchess of Saxe-Coburg and Gotha
