= Frederick VII of Denmark =

King of Denmark from 1848 to 1863

Frederick VII
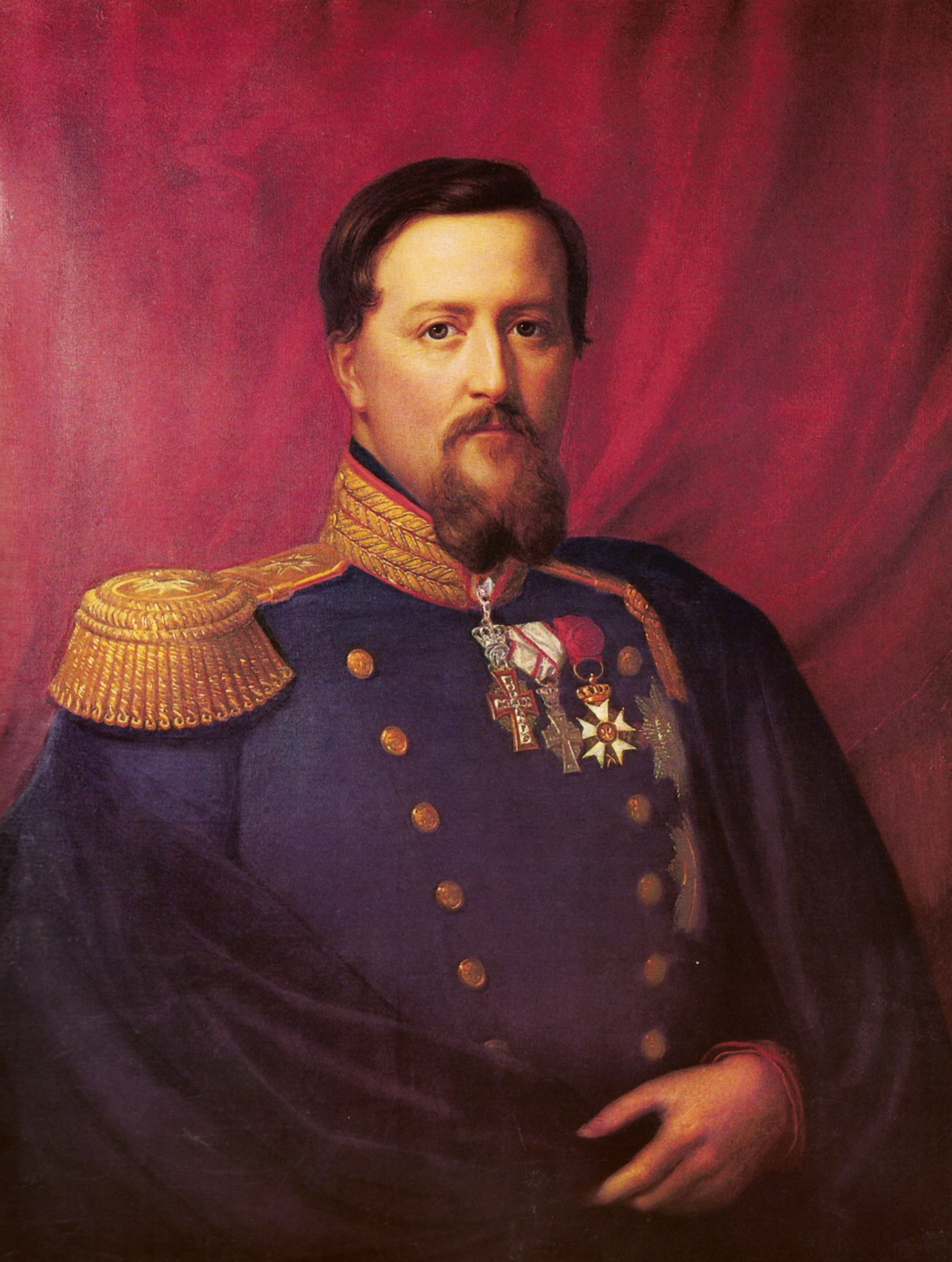
- Portrait by August Schiøtt, c. 1850

King of Denmark
- Reign: 20 January 1848 – 15 November 1863
- Predecessor: Christian VIII
- Successor: Christian IX
- Born: 6 October 1808; Copenhagen, Denmark
- Died: 15 November 1863 (aged 55); Glücksburg, Duchy of Holstein
- Burial: Roskilde Cathedral
- Spouses: Vilhelmine Marie of Denmark (m. 1828; div. 1837) Caroline Mariane of Mecklenburg-Strelitz (m. 1841; div. 1846) Louise Rasmussen (m. 1850)
Names
- Frederik Carl Christian
- House: Oldenburg
- Father: Christian VIII of Denmark
- Mother: Charlotte Frederica of Mecklenburg-Schwerin

Frederick VII (Frederik Carl Christian; 6 October 1808 – 15 November 1863) was King of Denmark from 1848 to 1863. He was the last Danish monarch of the older Royal branch of the House of Oldenburg and the last king of Denmark to rule as an absolute monarch. During his reign, he signed a constitution that established a Danish parliament and made the country a constitutional monarchy. Frederick's motto was Folkets Kærlighed, min Styrke (Danish for the People's Love, my Strength). He was succeeded by his paternal second cousin Christian IX.

== Early life ==
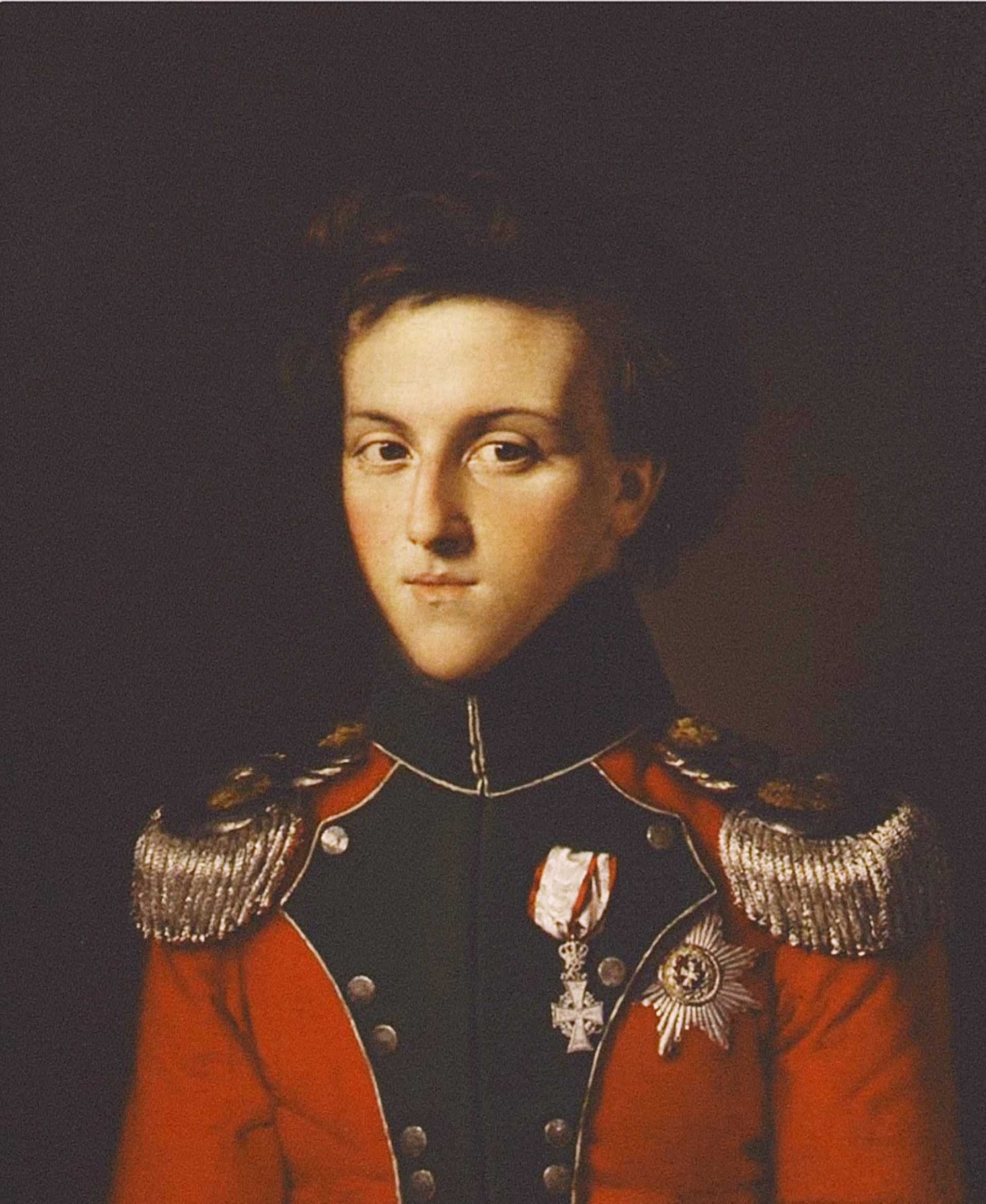
Portrait of Prince Frederick, c. 1824

The future King Frederick VII was born at 11 a.m. on 6 October 1808 at his parents' residence Levetzau's Palace, an 18th-century palace which forms part of the Amalienborg Palace complex in central Copenhagen. Born into the House of Oldenburg, the royal house which had ruled Denmark since the 15th century, he was the second, but eldest surviving, child to the then Prince Christian Frederick of Denmark, the future King Christian VIII, and his first wife Duchess Charlotte Frederica of Mecklenburg-Schwerin. His maternal grandparents were Friedrich Franz I, Grand Duke of Mecklenburg-Schwerin, and Luise, Duchess of Saxe-Gotha.

The young prince was baptised on 17 October by the royal confessor Nicolai Edinger Balle, Bishop of Zealand, with the names Frederik Carl Christian. To his mother, he was always known as Fritz.

== Marriages ==
The king's first two marriages both ended in scandal and divorce. He was first married in Copenhagen on 1 November 1828 to his second cousin Princess Vilhelmine Marie of Denmark, a daughter of King Frederick VI of Denmark. They separated in 1834 and divorced in 1837. On 10 June 1841 he married for a second time to Duchess Caroline Charlotte Mariane of Mecklenburg-Strelitz, whom he divorced in 1846. On 7 August 1850 in Frederiksborg Palace, he morganatically married Louise Christina Rasmussen, whom he created Lensgrevinde Danner in 1850, a milliner and former ballet dancer who had for many years been his acquaintance or mistress, the natural daughter of Gotthilf L. Køppen and of Juliane Caroline Rasmussen. This marriage seems to have been happy, although it aroused great moral indignation among the nobility and the bourgeoisie. Rasmussen was denounced as a vulgar gold digger by her enemies, but viewed as an unaffected daughter of the people by her admirers and seems to have had a stabilizing effect on him. She also worked at maintaining his popularity by letting him meet the people of the provinces.

=== Extramarital relations and possible offspring ===
The expectation that Frederick would not likely produce offspring, despite numerous affairs, was widespread, but sources rarely state the reasons. Some speculate that Frederick was infertile. During the reign of Frederick's father, Christian VIII, the succession question was already being brought forward. (See below: Succession crisis)

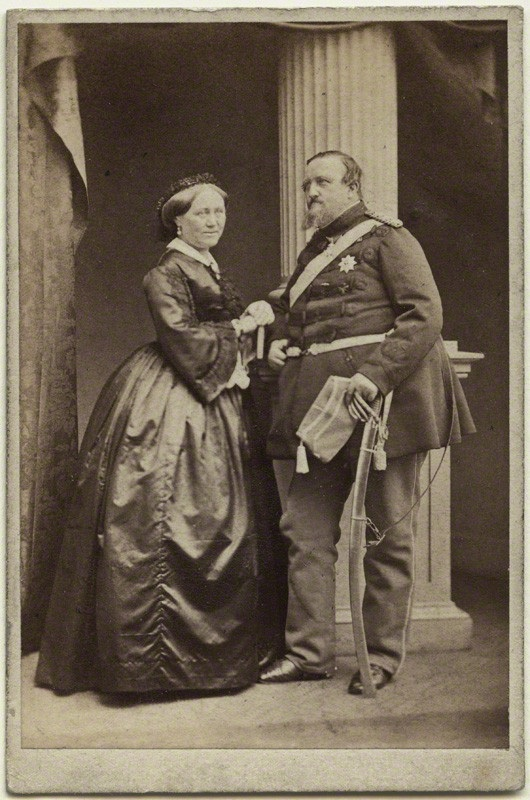
Photograph of Frederick VII and his morganatic spouse Louise Rasmussen, c. 1860–61

It has been claimed that Frederick did indeed father a son, Frederik Carl Christian Poulsen, born on 21 November 1843, as a result of his relationship with Else Maria Guldborg Pedersen (also referred to as Marie Poulsen), which took place after his first two unhappy marriages. This was first asserted in 1994. In 2009, a Danish woman, Else Margrethe ('Gete') Bondo Oldenborg Maaløe claimed to be the great-granddaughter of Frederick VII through Frederik Carl. Maaloe possesses four letters from Frederick to Marie Poulsen acknowledging paternity; these are quoted in her book, published in 2009. In all cases, however, extramarital offspring were and still are barred from the line of succession.

It has been claimed Frederick had a same-sex relationship with his friend, Carl Berling (1812–1871), publisher and owner of the newspaper Berlingske Tidende. The bisexual Berling had an illegitimate child with Louise Rasmussen, Carl Christian (1841–1908). Carl Christian was much liked by the King, to the extent that he insisted on signing the new constitution on Carl Christian's 8th birthday on 5 June 1849. To retain a tinge of decency, the King married Louise Rasmussen and the trio then moved into the royal castle, where Berling was appointed Chamberlain and remained until 1861. The public indignation within higher circles over Frederick's morganatic marriage is well-known, but reasons have rarely been explained in detail.

== Reign ==
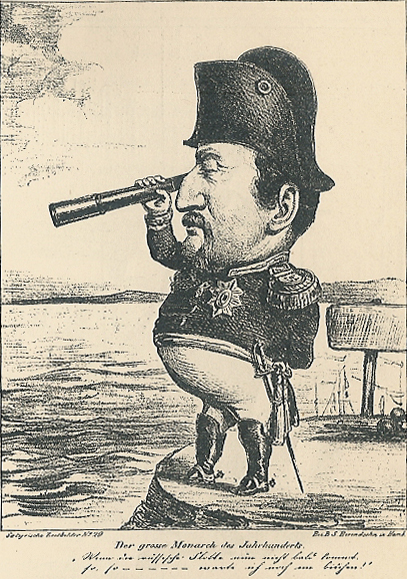
German caricature of Frederick VII made during the First Schleswig War

Frederick, who was the last king of the older branch of the Oldenburg dynasty, had a rather neglected childhood after the divorce of his parents. His youth was marked by private scandals and for many years he appeared as the problem child of the royal family. When he succeeded to the throne in January 1848, he was almost at once met by the demands for a constitution. The Schleswig-Holsteiners wanted an independent state while the Danes wished to maintain South Jutland as a Danish area. The king soon yielded to the Danish demands, and in March he accepted the end of absolutism, which resulted in the June Constitution of 1849. During the First War of Schleswig against the German powers in 1848–51, Frederick appeared as ”the national leader" and was regarded almost as a war hero, despite having never taken any active part in the struggles.

During his reign, Frederick on the whole behaved as a constitutional monarch. He did not, however, quite give up interfering in politics. In 1854, he contributed to the fall of the strongly conservative Ørsted cabinet, and in 1859–60, he accepted a liberal government appointed on the initiative of his wife. During the crisis in the Duchies in 1862–63, shortly before his death, he spoke openly for an inter-Scandinavian military co-operation. Those minor crises created frictions and maintained some permanent insecurity, but did not damage his general popularity. In some of these affairs, he overstepped the mark beyond any doubt; on the other hand, the first Danish constitution was somewhat vague as regards the limits of royal power.

Frederick's rule also witnessed the heyday of the National Liberal Party, which was in office from 1854. This period was marked by some political and economic reforms, such as the beginning of the demolition of the walls around Copenhagen and, in 1857, the introduction of free trade. The constant quarrels with the opposition regarding the Schleswig-Holstein Question and German demands that Denmark not try to unite with Schleswig (South Jutland) led to some changes to the constitution in order to fit the foreign political situation, which created frustration in Denmark. The National Liberals therefore at last favored a more resistant course against the Germans, which led to the Second War of Schleswig in 1864. The king wholeheartedly supported this course and just before his sudden death he was prepared to sign a new special constitution for Denmark and Schleswig (the so-called November Constitution).

== Succession crisis ==
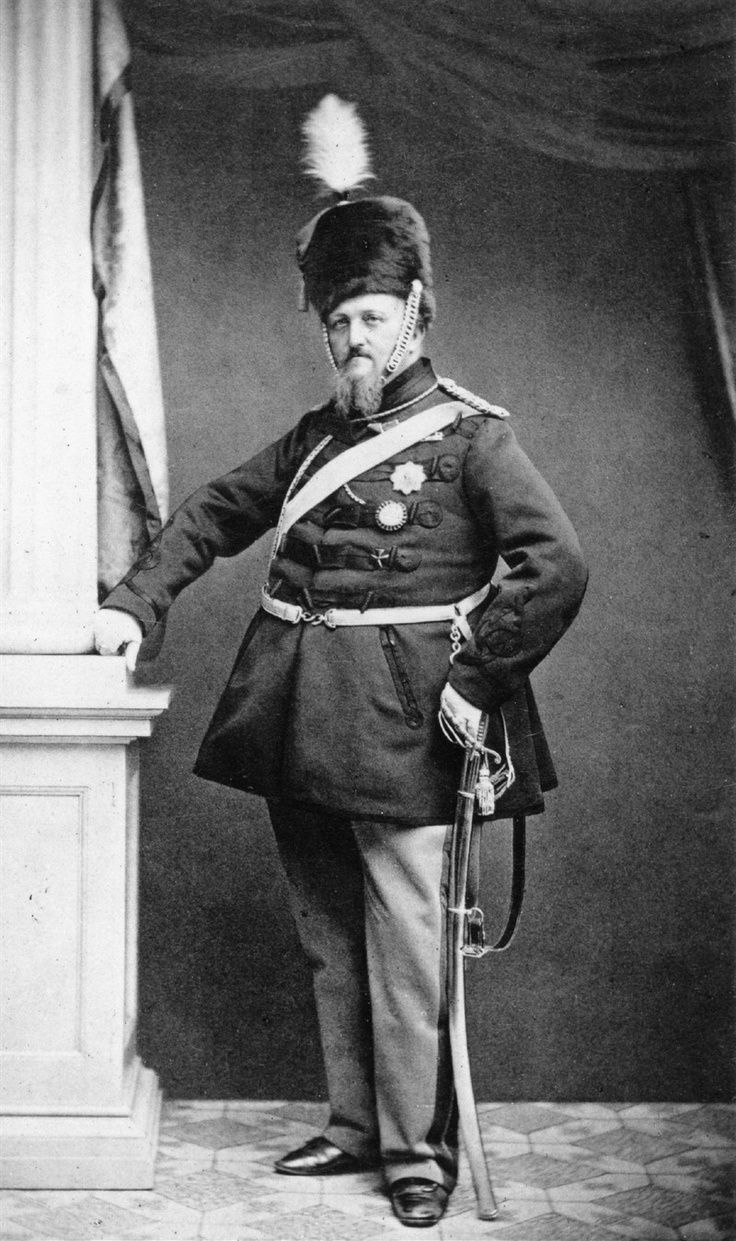
Photograph of Frederick VII, c. 1860

Frederick was married three times, but he produced no legitimate issue. The fact that he reached middle age without producing an heir meant that his second cousin Prince Christian of Glücksburg (1818–1906), the paternal descendant of Christian III, was chosen as his heir-presumptive in 1852. When Frederick died in 1863, Christian took the throne as Christian IX.

Nationalism in the German-speaking parts of Schleswig-Holstein meant that there was no consensus to keep the duchies united under the Danish crown, internationally or within the duchies themselves. The duchies were inherited according to Salic law among the descendants of a past heiress, Hedvig of Holstein, whose heir according to primogeniture after King Frederick VII was Frederick, Duke of Augustenburg (who proclaimed himself Duke of Schleswig-Holstein after Frederick VII's death). This Frederick of Augustenburg had become the symbol of the nationalist German independence movement in Schleswig-Holstein since the time that his father, in exchange for compensation, had renounced his claims as first in line to inherit the twin Duchies of Schleswig and Holstein following the London Protocol of 8 May 1852, which concluded the First War of Schleswig. Because of his father's renunciation, Frederick was regarded as ineligible to succeed.

Denmark was (up until 1953) also under Salic Law, but only among descendants of Frederick III (who was the first hereditary monarch of Denmark; previously the kingdom had been, officially, elective). But Frederick VII was the last of Frederick III's male line, therefore, his nearest kinsmen in the male-line, the Schleswig-Holstein ducal lines of Augustenborg and Glücksburg (cadet branches of Denmark's earlier, non-hereditary kings), were not entitled to succeed to Denmark's throne, although they retained hereditary claims to the duchies of Schleswig and Holstein. Upon Frederick VII's death, Denmark's throne could devolve to or through a female heir according to "semi-Salic" succession. There were, however, conflicting interpretations of that provision and of Denmark's claim to its applicability to the duchies of Schleswig and Holstein, held theretofore in personal union by the kings of Denmark. The question was solved by an election and a separate law to confirm Denmark's new successor.

The closest female relatives of Frederick VII were the issue of his paternal aunt, Princess Louise Charlotte of Denmark, who had married a cadet Hessian prince. However, they were not male-line descendants of Helwig of Schauenburg, and thus were not eligible to succeed in Holstein, and had disputed claims on Schleswig. The semi-Salic heiresses of Frederick VII were Princess Caroline of Denmark and Frederick VII's divorced wife Vilhelmine (both childless daughters of the late King Frederick VI). They were followed in the line of succession by Princess Louise Auguste of Denmark, sister of Frederick VI, who had married Frederick, Duke of Augustenburg, Salic heir to Schleswig and Holstein after Frederick VII, but whose wife's claim to Denmark would only come into effect after the deaths of Caroline and Vilhelmine, both still living in 1863.

Some rights also belonged to the Glücksburg line, a more junior branch of the royal clan. They were also semi-Salic heirs of Frederick III through a daughter of Frederick V of Denmark's, and they were more junior agnatic heirs eligible to succeed in Schleswig-Holstein. These dynasts were Christian of Glücksburg (1818–1906) and his two elder brothers, the younger of whom had sons and daughters.

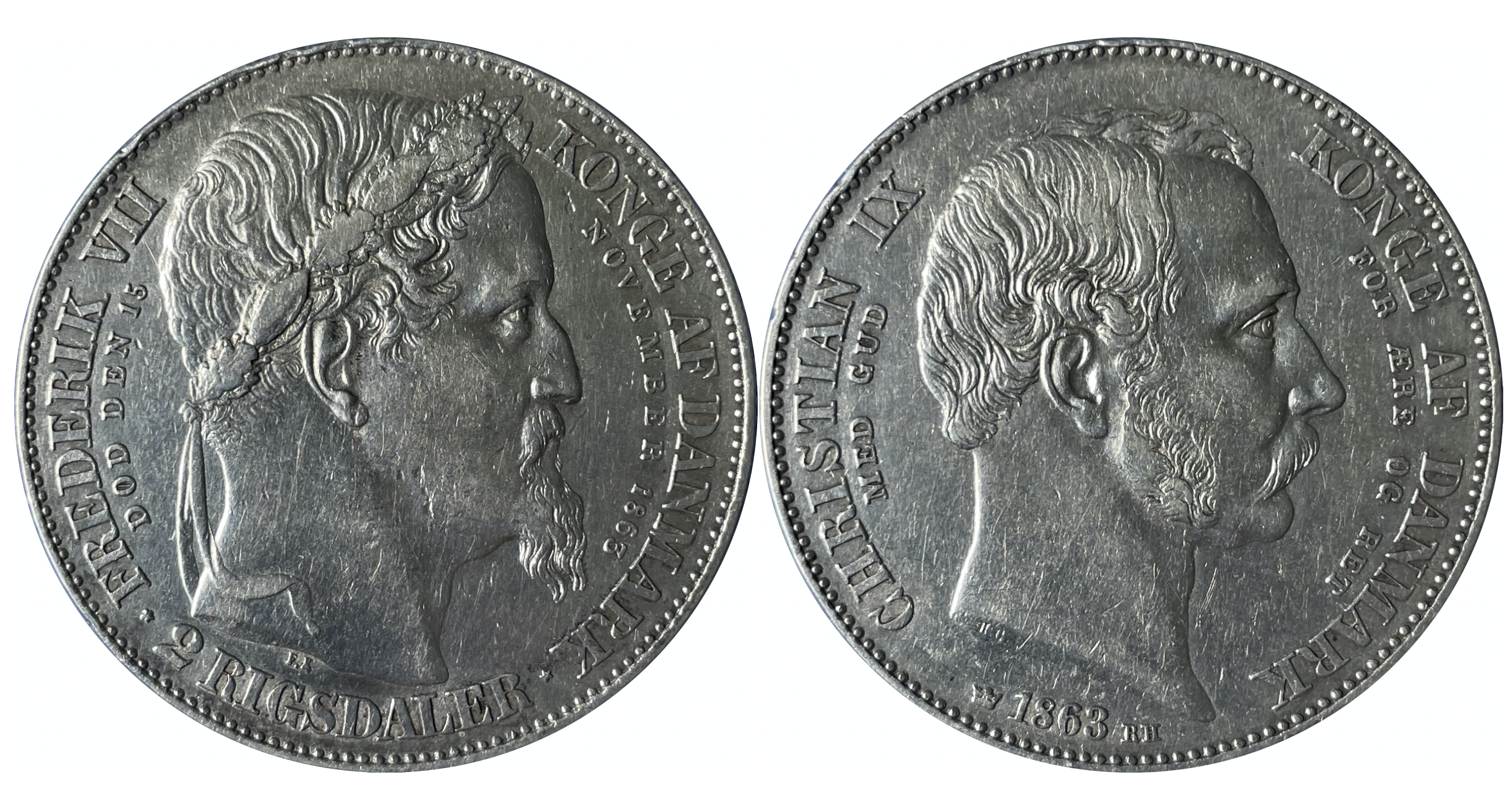
2 rigsdaler – death of Frederick VII and accession of Christian IX

Prince Christian of Glücksburg (1818–1906) had been a foster grandson of the sonless royal couple Frederick VI and Queen Marie Sophie, and he thus was well known at the royal court. Prince Christian was a nephew of Queen Marie Sophie's and descended from a first cousin of Frederick VI. He was brought up as a Dane, having lived in Danish-speaking lands of the royal dynasty, and he never bore arms for German interests against Denmark, as had other princes of the House of Glücksburg and the House of Augustenburg. This made him a relatively attractive royal candidate from the Danish viewpoint since, as a descendant of Frederick III, he was eligible to succeed in Denmark, although not first in line. He was also, but separately, eligible to inherit the dual duchies, but was not first in line either. Christian of Glücksburg also had married Princess Louise of Hesse-Kassel, second-eldest daughter of the closest female relative of Frederick VII's. Louise's mother and brothers, princes of Hesse in Germany, renounced their rights in favor of Louise and her husband. Prince Christian's wife thereby became the closest female heiress of Frederick VII's. The thorny question of the application of semi-Salic provision in the succession of Denmark was at that point resolved by legislation, through which Prince Christian of Glücksburg was chosen in 1852 to succeed Frederick VII in Denmark.

Frederick VII died in Glücksburg in 1863 following an attack of erysipelas and was interred in Roskilde Cathedral. Christian took the throne as Christian IX.

In November 1863, Frederick of Augustenborg claimed the twin-duchies in succession to Frederick VII of Denmark, who also was the last king of Denmark who, by primogeniture, was also sovereign Duke of Schleswig and Holstein, but whose death extinguished the patriline of Denmark's hereditary Oldenburg kings. The resulting divergence of hereditary claims to the duchies eventually developed into the Second War of Schleswig.

== Legacy ==
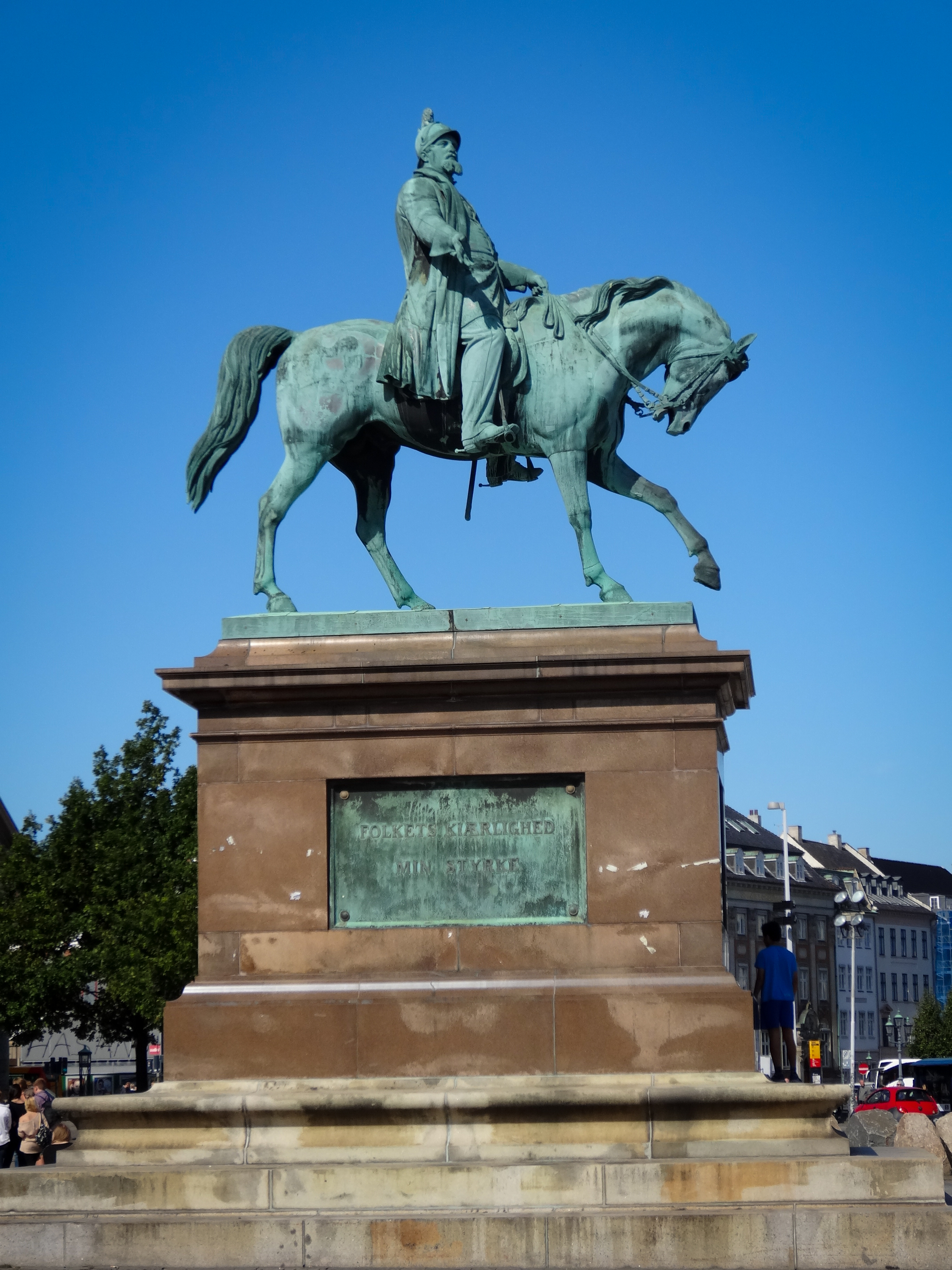
Equestrian statue of Frederick VII, Christiansborg Palace, Slotsholmen

Frederick VII managed to make himself one of the most beloved Danish kings of recent times. This was probably due partially to his relinquishment of absolutism and partially to his personality. In spite of many weaknesses documented by his contemporaries — drinking, eccentric behavior, etc. — he also possessed something of a gift as an actor. He could be both folksy and genuinely hearty, able to appear as a "simple, yet dignified monarch". During his many travels throughout Denmark, he cultivated contacts with ordinary subjects. He was also a keen antiquarian and according to the later Danish archaeologist P.V. Glob, it was "he, more than anyone else, [who] helped to arouse the wide interest in Danish antiquities".

== Honours ==
Danish honours

- Knight of the Elephant, 28 October 1817
- Cross of Honour of the Order of the Dannebrog
- Grand Commander of the Dannebrog, 10 June 1841

Foreign honours

- Ascanian duchies: Grand Cross of Albert the Bear, 17 December 1840
- Austrian Empire: Grand Cross of St. Stephen, 1849
- Belgium: Grand Cordon of the Order of Leopold, 20 March 1857
- Empire of Brazil: Grand Cross of the Order of Pedro I
- French Empire: Grand Cross of the Legion of Honour
- Kingdom of Hanover:
  - Knight of St. George, 1851
  - Grand Cross of the Royal Guelphic Order
- Electorate of Hesse: Knight of the Golden Lion
- Kingdom of Italy: Knight of the Annunciation, 25 August 1861
- Netherlands: Grand Cross of the Military William Order, 21 June 1849
- Oldenburg: Grand Cross of the Order of Duke Peter Friedrich Ludwig, with Golden Crown, 10 February 1848
- Kingdom of Portugal: Grand Cross of the Sash of the Three Orders
- Kingdom of Prussia:
  - Knight of the Black Eagle, 14 December 1840
  - Grand Cross of the Red Eagle
- Russian Empire:
  - Knight of St. Andrew
  - Knight of St. Alexander Nevsky
  - Knight of the White Eagle
  - Knight of St. Anna, 1st Class
- Spain: Knight of the Golden Fleece, 25 February 1848
- Sweden-Norway:
  - Knight of the Seraphim, 14 June 1841
  - Knight of the Order of Charles XIII, 11 April 1853
  - Grand Cross of St. Olav
- Beylik of Tunis: Husainid Family Order
- Two Sicilies: Knight of St. Januarius, 1848

Frederick VII House of Oldenburg Born: 6 October 1808 Died: 15 November 1863
Regnal titles
Preceded by Christian VIII	King of Denmark; Duke of Schleswig, Holstein and Saxe-Lauenburg; 1848–1863	Succeeded by Christian IX
