= Duke Gustav Wilhelm of Mecklenburg-Schwerin =

German royal (1781–1851)

Duke Gustav Wilhelm
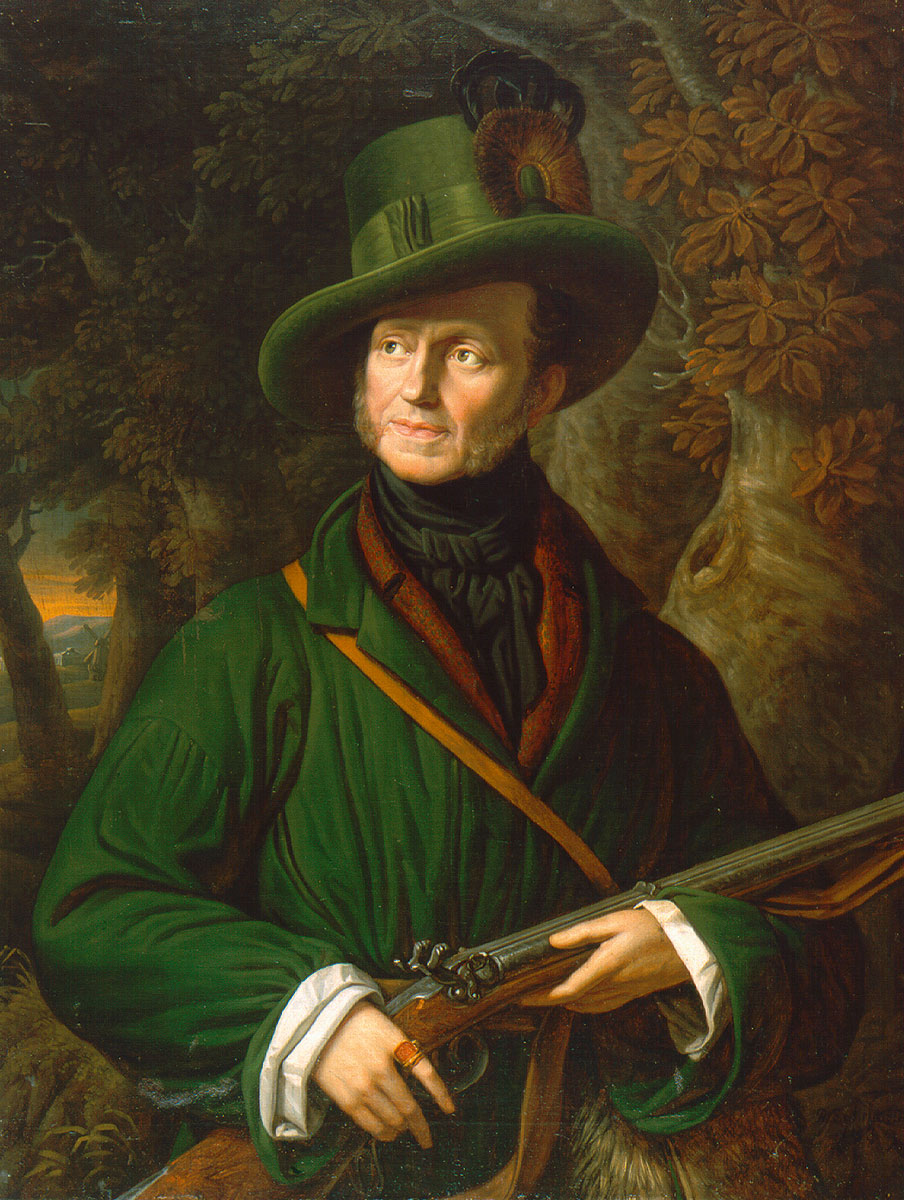
- Portrait by Rudolph Suhrlandt, 1839
- Born: 31 January 1781; Ludwigslust, Duchy of Mecklenburg-Schwerin
- Died: 10 January 1851 (aged 69); Ludwigslust, Grand Duchy of Mecklenburg-Schwerin
- Burial: Louisen-Mausoleum, Ludwigslust
Names
- Gustav Wilhelm
- House: Mecklenburg-Schwerin
- Father: Frederick Francis I, Grand Duke of Mecklenburg-Schwerin
- Mother: Princess Louise of Saxe-Gotha-Altenburg

Duke Gustav Wilhelm of Mecklenburg-Schwerin (31 January 1781 – 10 January 1851) was a member of the German grand ducal house of Mecklenburg-Schwerin.

== Military career ==
Gustav Wilhelm was born in Ludwigslust on 31 January 1781, the second surviving son of Frederick Francis, Hereditary Prince of Mecklenburg-Schwerin, later Grand Duke, and Princess Louise of Saxe-Gotha-Altenburg.

In 1807, the ducal family went into exile in Altona during the Napoleonic Wars. Gustav Wilhelm served as a ryttmästare in the Swedish Army and a major in the Prussian Army. He was on his Grand Tour in Naples in 1813 when the German campaign of 1813 broke out and subsequently returned to Ludwigslust to take up the rank of major in the Mecklenburger volunteer regiment. He was wounded at the Battle of Sehested and lost two fingers. He was captured by Denmark but exchanged a few hours later.

== Later life ==
After the war, Gustav Wilhelm settled in Italy before returning to Mecklenburg in 1827. In 1830, he commissioned the architect Friedrich Georg Erich Groß to build Villa Gustava, a residence in Ludwigslust completed in 1832.

Gustav Wilhelm was a talented musician and sang and played guitar at court concerts at Ludwigslust Palace. Composer Louis Massonneau dedicated his "Six Trios" to him. He was a domherr (canon) in Magdeburg.

In 1848, Gustav Wilhelm was made a godfather of Princess Louise, fourth daughter of Queen Victoria. He died on 10 January 1851 in Ludwigslust at the age of 69. His great-nephew, Grand Duke Frederick Francis II, declared national mourning. He was interred in the Louisen-Mausoleum in the schlosspark of Ludwigslust Palace.

== Legacy ==
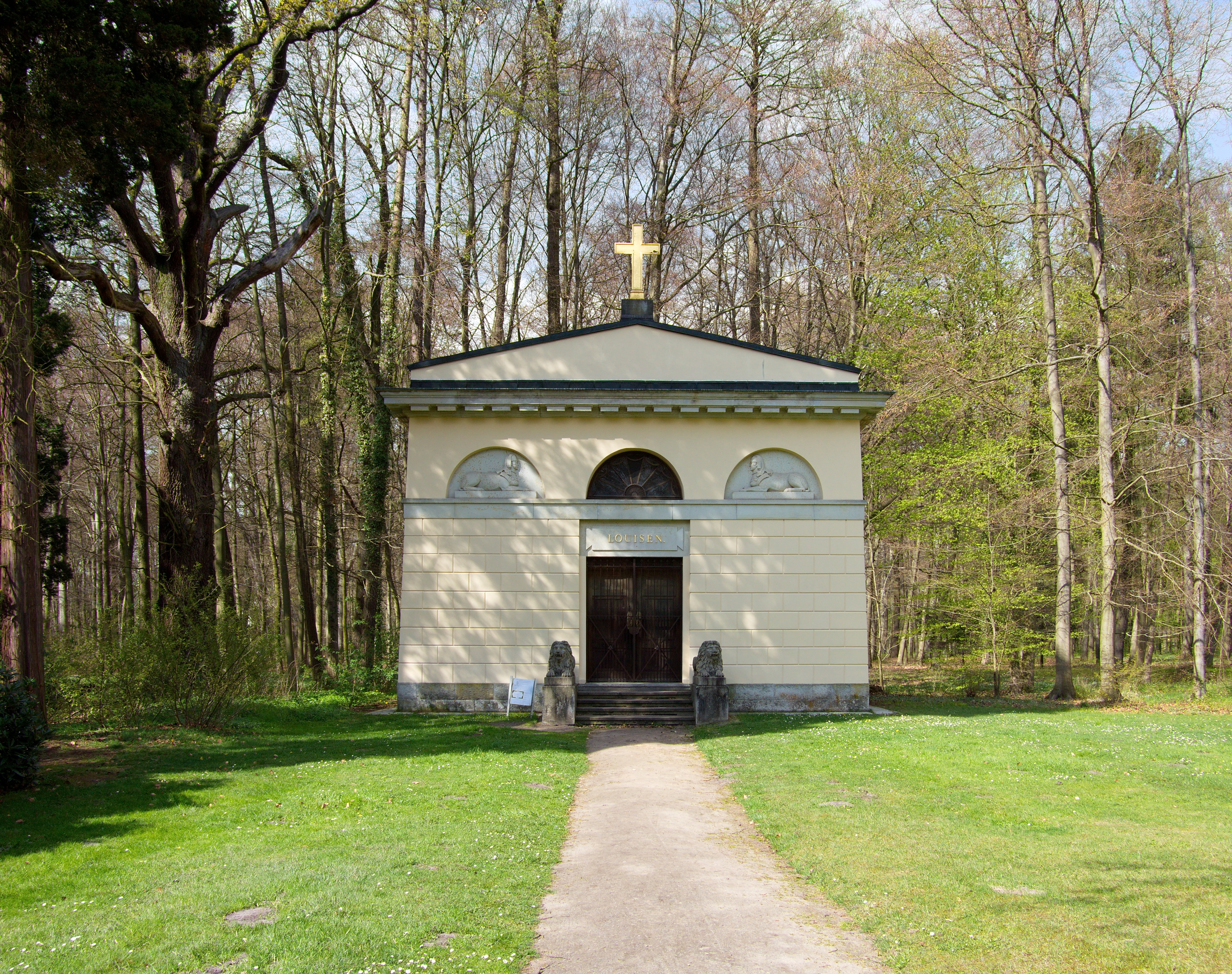
Louisen-Mausoleum

He never married. Karl Heinrich Ulrichs mentions him as homosexual.

Villa Gustava continued to be occupied by members of the grand ducal family, including Duke William and Duchess Paul Frederick, until 1923. Today it has fallen into ruin.

== Honours ==
- Mecklenburg-Schwerin:
  - Military Merit Medal for 1813–1815
  - Mecklenburg Campaign Medal
- Kingdom of Prussia:
  - Grand Cross of the Order of the Red Eagle
  - Royal Prussian Order of Saint John
- Sweden: Commander Grand Cross of the Order of the Sword
- The Netherlands: Knight Grand Cross of the Order of the Netherlands Lion
- Kingdom of Hanover: Grand Cross of the Royal Guelphic Order
- Russian Empire: Knight, 4th Class, of the Order of St George
- Denmark: Knight of the Order of the Elephant, 14 July 1841

== Bibliography ==
- Heinrich Francke: Mecklenburgs Noth und Kampf vor und in dem Befreiungskriege: zur Feier des funfzigjährigen Regierungsjubiläi Sr. Königlichen Hoheit des Allerdurchlauchtigsten Grossherzogs Friedrich Franz des Ersten von Mecklenburg-Schwerin, nach Handschriften und gedruckten Urkunden dargestellt. Wismar: Schmidt & v. Cossel 1835
- Johann Heinrich Friedrich Berlien: Der Elephanten-Orden und seine Ritter. Kopenhagen: Selbstverlag 1846, S. 178
- Grewolls, Grete (2011). Wer war wer in Mecklenburg und Vorpommern. Das Personenlexikon (in German). Rostock: Hinstorff Verlag. p. 3654. ISBN 978-3-356-01301-6.
