= Duchess Charlotte Frederica of Mecklenburg-Schwerin =

Charlotte Frederica of Mecklenburg-Schwerin
- Hereditary Princess of Denmark
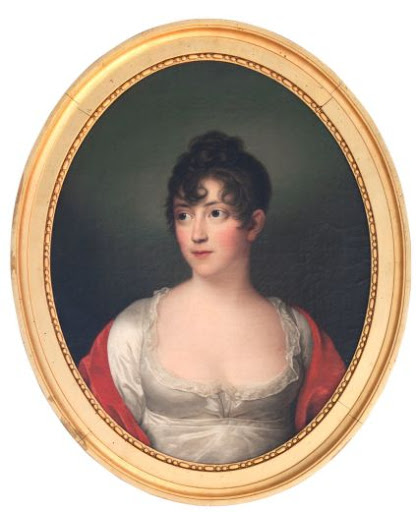
- Born: 4 December 1784; Ludwigslust, Duchy of Mecklenburg-Schwerin
- Died: 13 July 1840 (aged 55); Rome, Papal States
- Burial: Teutonic Cemetery, Rome (allegedly)
- Spouse: Christian Frederick, Hereditary Prince of Denmark (later Christian VIII) (m. 1806; div. 1810)
- Issue: Frederick VII of Denmark
Names
- German: Charlotte Friederike; Danish: Charlotte Frederikke
- House: Mecklenburg-Schwerin
- Father: Frederick Francis I, Grand Duke of Mecklenburg-Schwerin
- Mother: Louise of Saxe-Gotha-Altenburg

Duchess Charlotte Frederica of Mecklenburg-Schwerin (4 December 1784 – 13 July 1840), was the first wife of Christian VIII from 1806 until 1810, before he became King of Norway and later King of Denmark. She was a daughter of Frederick Francis I, Grand Duke of Mecklenburg-Schwerin, and Princess Louise of Saxe-Gotha-Altenburg.

== Life ==
=== Early life ===
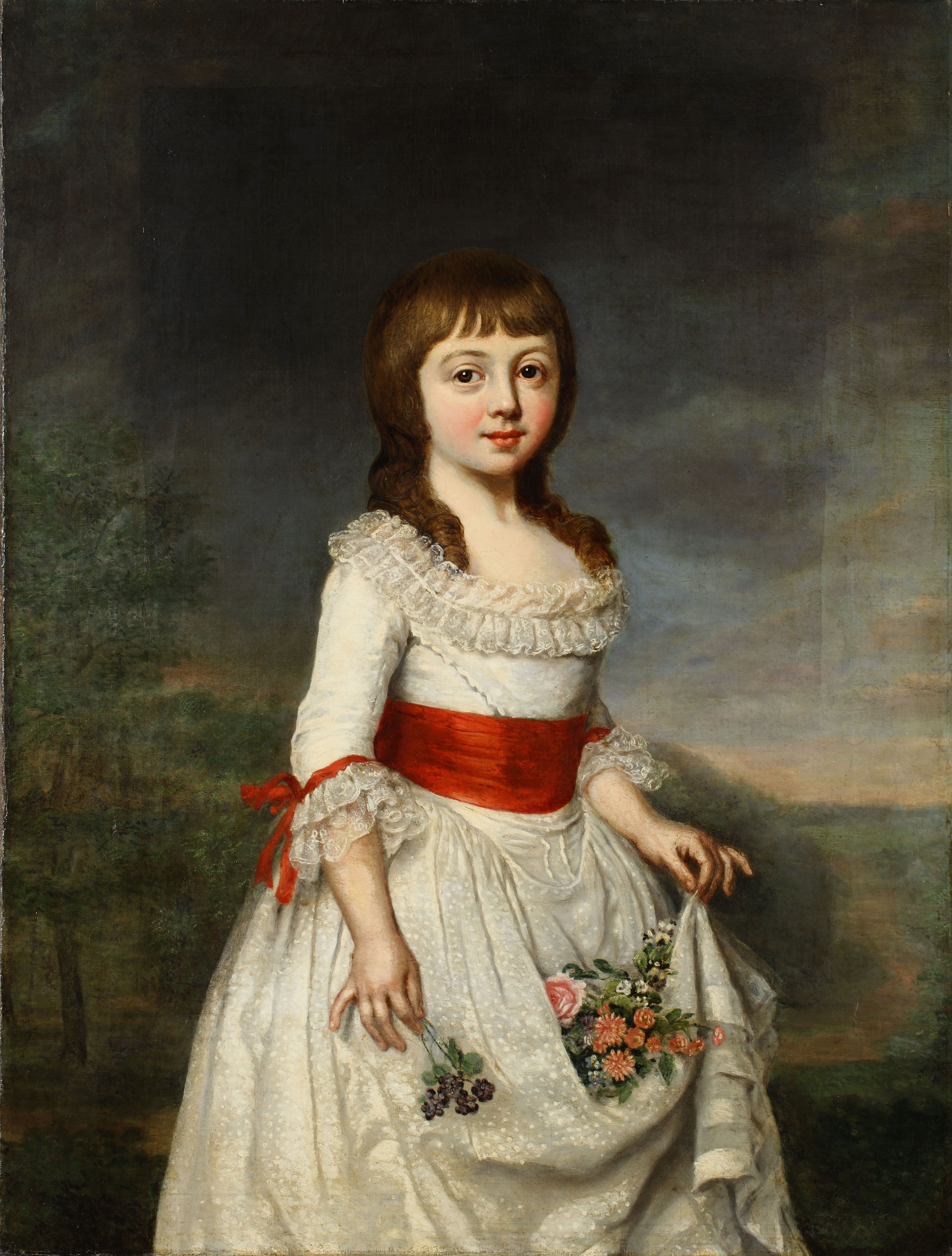
Charlotte Frederica painted by Lisiewski during her childhood

Duchess Charlotte Frederica was born on 4 December 1784 in Ludwigslust in Mecklenburg as the seventh and penultimate surviving child of the later Grand Duke Frederick Francis I of Mecklenburg-Schwerin and Princess Louise of Saxe-Gotha-Altenburg.

Duchess Charlotte Frederikke grew up with her siblings at her parents' court in Mecklenburg. She was a lively child, who was never bothered by strict educators, did what suited her regardless of formalities, found friends among the servants, and dressed in variegated clothing, contrary to the customs of the times.

=== Marriage ===
During a long voyage to Germany in 1804, her cousin, the Danish Prince Christian Frederick of Denmark (later King Christian VIII), stayed for a longer time at his uncle's court in Schwerin, where he fell in love with his cousin, Duchess Charlotte Frederica, who was two years older than him. They married two years later, on 21 June 1806 in Ludwigslust in Mecklenburg.

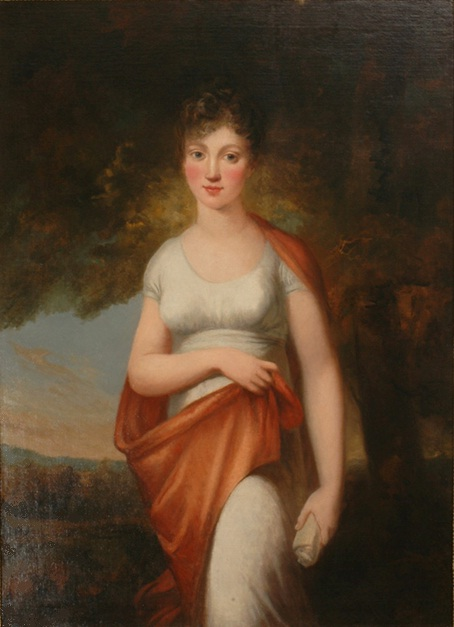
Portrait of Charlotte Frederica by Carl Frederik von Breda, c. 1806.

The young couple initially settled at Plön Castle in the Duchy of Holstein. It was here, that Charlotte Frederica gave birth to their first-born son, Prince Christian Frederick, who was born and died on 8 April 1807. From 1808 the couple lived in Copenhagen, where they took residence at Levetzau's Palace, an 18th-century town house which forms part of the Amalienborg Palace complex in the district Frederiksstaden in central Copenhagen. As their country residence they used Sorgenfri Palace, located on the shores of the small river Mølleåen in Kongens Lyngby north of Copenhagen.

Nonetheless, their married life was problematic. Princess Charlotte Frederica was very preoccupied with the ideas that originated in the French Revolution and embraced the idea of individual freedom at a time of absolutism's assertion of hierarchical society. Her character was thought to be capricious, frivolous and mythomaniac. The lifestyle at court was rigid and traditional, and it did not suit her as she was used to a freer lifestyle from home and did her best to change that. One winter evening during a party that presumably bored her, she let the servants bring up snow and set about throwing snowballs.

She was wasteful and constantly in want of money despite an ample apanage, forcing her husband to step in. If he protested, she overpowered him in front of the servants. Prince Christian Frederick also often had to apologize to the Crown Prince Regent for his wife's behavior. In a letter, he writes that he has had a serious conversation with her and that she has "realized her mistakes and promised improvement and that with a sincere heart, I am convinced of that."

On 6 October 1808, Charlotte Frederica gave birth to their second son and only surviving child, Prince Frederick Carl Christian, the future King Frederick VII of Denmark, who was called Fritz by his mother throughout his life. Her joy at motherhood was great, but did not change her behavior.

=== Divorce and banishment ===
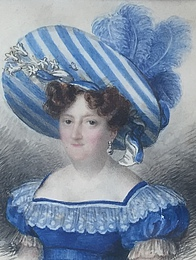
Portrait of Charlotte Frederica (1822)

In 1809, her alleged affair with her singing teacher, Swiss-born singer and composer Édouard Du Puy, led to her removal from the court. For this reason, her husband divorced her in 1810, banished her from court, sent her into internal exile, and prohibited her from ever seeing her son again.

After her divorce, Charlotte Frederica spent the next years of her life in a palace in Horsens, in Jutland and partly in Aarhus, where she cultivated social circles among the local bourgeoisie and had affairs with officers.

=== Later life ===
In 1829 she moved from Denmark to Karlsbad under the name "Mrs. von Gothen." In 1830 she traveled to Italy, finally settling in Rome and later converted to the Catholic faith.

Charlotte Frederica died in Rome in 1840. Her death was described as a relief to the court in Copenhagen as she dreamed of someday returning as the King's mother. Frederik VII, who was only one year old when she had to leave him, showed great reverence towards the memory of his late mother: he collected portraits of her in his rooms at Jægerspris Castle, and when he visited Horsens in September 1857 he officially thanked the city "for the love and kindness that was shown to her."

She was alleged to have been buried in the Teutonic Cemetery in Vatican City. Her tomb was opened on 11 July 2019 due to investigations related to the disappearance of Emanuela Orlandi, but was found to be empty.

== Ancestry ==
Ancestors of Duchess Charlotte Frederica of Mecklenburg-Schwerin

8. Christian Ludwig II, Duke of Mecklenburg-Schwerin
4. Duke Louis of Mecklenburg-Schwerin
9. Duchess Gustave Caroline of Mecklenburg-Strelitz
2. Frederick Francis I, Grand Duke of Mecklenburg-Schwerin
10. Francis Josias, Duke of Saxe-Coburg-Saalfeld
5. Princess Charlotte Sophie of Saxe-Coburg-Saalfeld
11. Princess Anna Sophie of Schwarzburg-Rudolstadt
1. Duchess Charlotte Frederica of Mecklenburg-Schwerin
12. Frederick II, Duke of Saxe-Gotha-Altenburg
6. Prince John August of Saxe-Gotha-Altenburg
13. Princess Magdalena Augusta of Anhalt-Zerbst
3. Princess Louise of Saxe-Gotha-Altenburg
14. Heinrich I, Count Reuss of Schleiz
7. Countess Louise Reuss of Schleiz
15. Countess Juliana Dorothea Louise of Löwenstein-Wertheim-Virneburg
