= Princess Louise of Saxe-Gotha-Altenburg (1756–1808) =

Louise of Saxe-Gotha-Altenburg
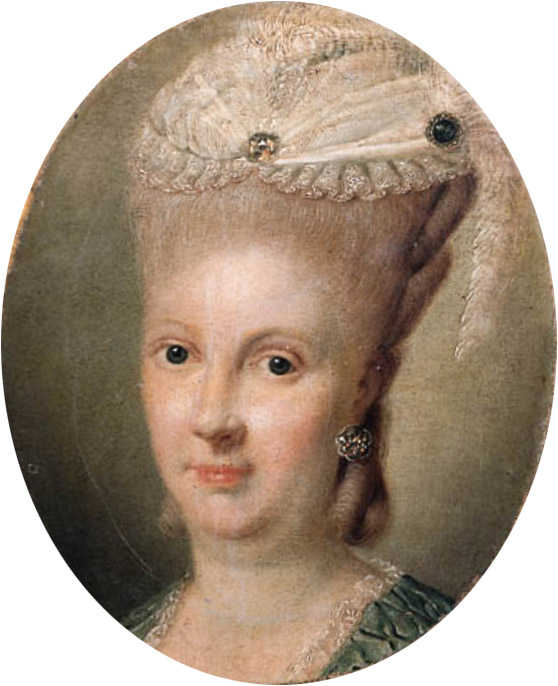

Duchess consort of Mecklenburg-Schwerin
- Tenure: 24 April 1785 – 1 January 1808
- Born: 9 March 1756; Roda, Duchy of Saxe-Gotha-Altenburg
- Died: 1 January 1808 (aged 51); Schloss Ludwigslust, Ludwigslust, Duchy of Mecklenburg-Schwerin
- Spouse: Frederick Francis I, Duke of Mecklenburg-Schwerin (m. 1775)
- Issue: Frederick Louis, Hereditary Grand Duke of Mecklenburg-Schwerin; Louise Charlotte, Hereditary Princess of Saxe-Gotha-Altenburg; Duke Gustav Wilhelm; Duke Karl; Charlotte Frederica, Hereditary Princess of Denmark; Duke Adolf
- House: Saxe-Gotha-Altenburg
- Father: Prince John August of Saxe-Gotha-Altenburg
- Mother: Countess Louise Reuss of Schleiz

Louise of Saxe-Gotha-Altenburg (German: Luise; 9 March 1756 – 1 January 1808) was Duchess of Mecklenburg-Schwerin through her marriage to Grand Duke Frederick Francis I.

== Life ==
Louise was the fourth and youngest child of Prince John August of Saxe-Gotha-Altenburg and Countess Louise Reuss of Schleiz. After the death of her mother in 1773, both she and her older sister Augusta inherited the title of co-Countess of Limpurg-Gaildorf as one of the several heirs of William Henry, Schenk of Limpurg zu Gaildorf (d. 1690 without surviving male issue). Both sisters retained their portions of the Limpurg-Gaildorf inheritance (1/4 of Amt Gaildorf and 1/16 of the town of Gaildorf) until 1780, when they sold their share to Charles Eugene, Duke of Württemberg.

In Gotha on 1 June 1775, Louise married Frederick Francis, Hereditary Duke of Mecklenburg-Schwerin, eldest child and only son of Duke Ludwig of Mecklenburg-Schwerin and his wife Princess Charlotte Sophie of Saxe-Coburg-Saalfeld. They had six children.

== Issue ==
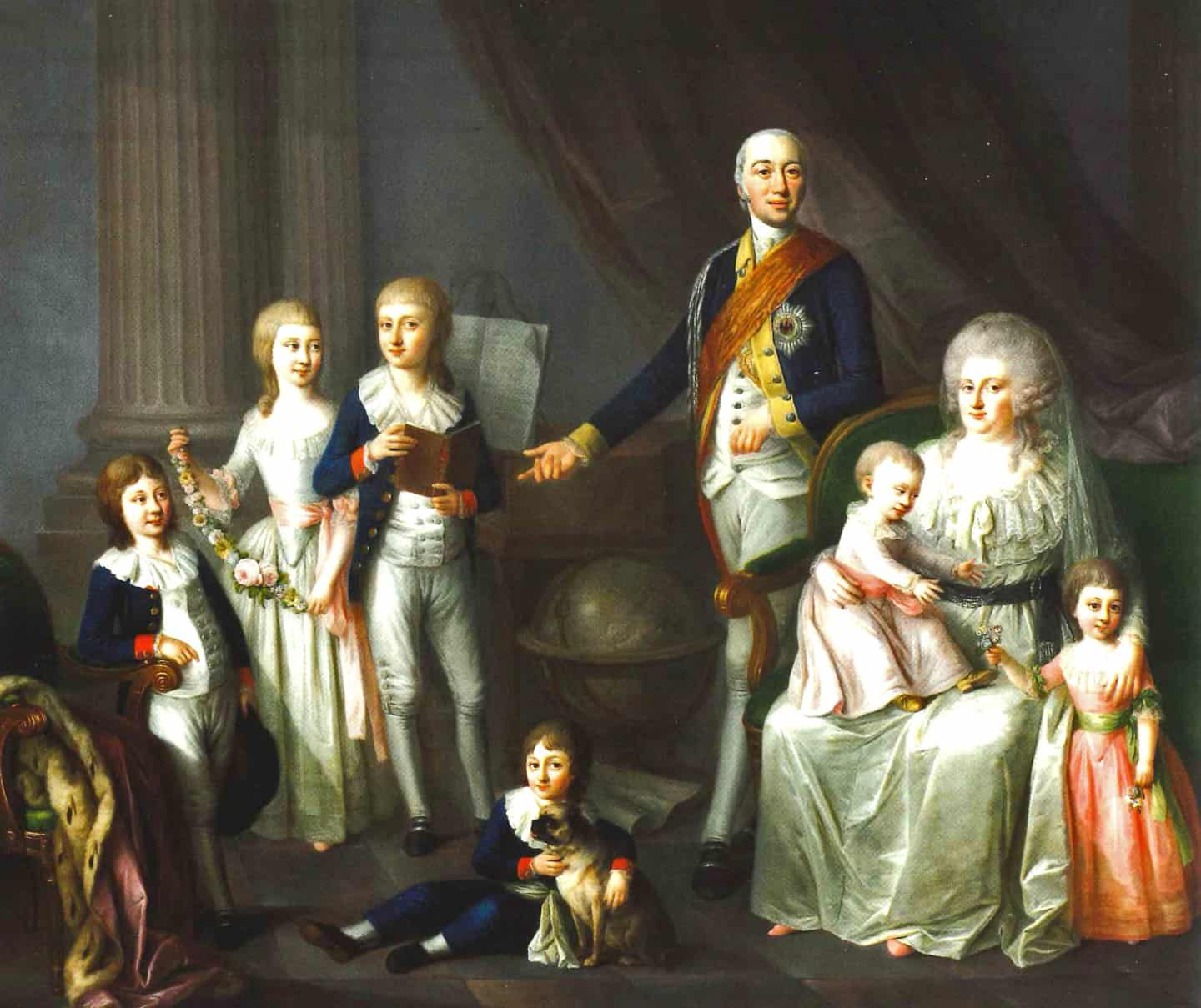
Duchess Louise and her family, by Daniel Woge, 1788

- Daughter (stillborn 7 May 1776), buried in the Schelfkirche St. Nikolai of Schwerin.
- Son (stillborn 11 May 1777), buried in the Schelfkirche St. Nikolai of Schwerin.
- Friedrich Ludwig (13 June 1778 – 29 November 1819). He married Grand Duchess Elena Pavlovna of Russia, a daughter of Paul I of Russia and Sophie Marie Dorothea of Württemberg. They were parents of Paul Friedrich, Grand Duke of Mecklenburg-Schwerin. Paul Friedrich's oldest son was Frederick Francis II, Grand Duke of Mecklenburg-Schwerin (1823–1883), who succeeded as Grand Duke in 1842. Friedrich Franz's youngest child was Heinrich (1876–1934), who married Queen Wilhelmina of the Netherlands in 1901. Heinrich, as Prince consort of the Netherlands, became known as Prins Hendrik. His oldest granddaughter is Princess Beatrix of the Netherlands.
- Louise Charlotte (19 November 1779 – 4 January 1801). Married Emil Leopold August, Duke of Saxe-Gotha-Altenburg. They were parents to Louise of Saxe-Gotha-Altenburg, mother of Albert, Prince Consort, and hence ancestors of the British royal family.
- Gustav Wilhelm (31 January 1781 – 10 January 1851).
- Karl (2 July 1782 – 22 May 1833).
- Charlotte Frederica (4 December 1784 – 13 July 1840). Married Christian VIII of Denmark. They were parents to Frederick VII of Denmark.
- Adolf (18 December 1785 – 8 May 1821).

== Ancestry ==
Ancestors of Princess Louise of Saxe-Gotha-Altenburg (1756–1808)

8. Frederick I, Duke of Saxe-Gotha-Altenburg
4. Frederick II, Duke of Saxe-Gotha-Altenburg
9. Princess Magdalena Sibylle of Saxe-Weissenfels
2. Prince John August of Saxe-Gotha-Altenburg
10. Charles, Prince of Anhalt-Zerbst
5. Princess Magdalena Augusta of Anhalt-Zerbst
11. Sophia of Saxe-Weissenfels
1. Princess Louise of Saxe-Gotha-Altenburg
12. Heinrich XI, Count Reuss of Schleiz
6. Heinrich I, Count Reuss of Schleiz
13. Johanna Dorothea of Tättenbach-Geilsdorf
3. Countess Louise Reuss of Schleiz
14. Eucharius Kasimir, Count of Löwenstein-Wertheim-Virneburg
7. Countess Juliana Dorothea Louise of Löwenstein-Wertheim-Virneburg
15. Countess Juliana Dorothea Luise of Limpurg-Gaildorf

Princess Louise of Saxe-Gotha-Altenburg (1756–1808) House of Saxe-Gotha-Altenburg Cadet branch of the House of Wettin Born: 9 March 1756 Died: 1 January 1808
German royalty
Preceded by Duchess Louise Frederica of Württemberg	Duchess consort of Mecklenburg-Schwerin; 24 April 1785 – 1 January 1808	Vacant Title next held by Princess Alexandrine of Prussia as Grand Duchess of Mecklenburg-Schwerin
