= Frederick Francis I =

Grand Duke of Mecklenburg-Schwerin from 1785 to 1837

Grand Duke of Mecklenburg-Schwerin
- Reign: 14 June 1815 – 1 February 1837
- Predecessor: Himself as Duke
- Successor: Paul Frederick

Duke of Mecklenburg-Schwerin
- Reign: 21 April 1785 – 14 June 1815
- Predecessor: Frederick II
- Successor: Himself as Grand Duke
- Born: 10 December 1756; Schwerin, Duchy of Mecklenburg-Schwerin
- Died: 1 February 1837 (aged 80); Ludwigslust, Grand Duchy of Mecklenburg-Schwerin
- Burial: Doberan Minster
- Spouse: Princess Louise of Saxe-Gotha-Altenburg (m. 1775; died 1808)
- Issue Among others: Frederick Louis, Hereditary Grand Duke of Mecklenburg-Schwerin; Louise Charlotte, Hereditary Princess of Saxe-Gotha-Altenburg; Duke Gustav Wilhelm; Charlotte Frederica, Hereditary Princess of Denmark
- House: Mecklenburg-Schwerin
- Father: Duke Louis of Mecklenburg-Schwerin
- Mother: Princess Charlotte Sophie of Saxe-Coburg-Saalfeld
- Religion: Lutheranism

Frederick Francis I (10 December 1756 – 1 February 1837) ruled over the German state of Mecklenburg-Schwerin, first as Duke from 1785 to 1815, and then as Grand Duke from 1815 until his death in 1837.

== Early life ==
Frederick Francis I was born in Schwerin, Duchy of Mecklenburg-Schwerin, on 10 December 1756. He was the son of Duke Louis of Mecklenburg-Schwerin and Princess Charlotte Sophie of Saxe-Coburg-Saalfeld.

When his uncle Fredrick II, Duke of Mecklenburg-Schwerin died in 1785 without an heir, he assumed control over the government as Duke Friedrich Francis I.

His paternal grandparents were Christian Ludwig II, Duke of Mecklenburg-Schwerin (son of Frederick, Duke of Mecklenburg-Grabow) and Duchess Gustave Caroline of Mecklenburg-Strelitz (daughter of Adolphus Frederick II, Duke of Mecklenburg-Strelitz). His maternal grandparents were Franz Josias, Duke of Saxe-Coburg-Saalfeld and Princess Anna Sophie of Schwarzburg-Rudolstadt.

== Reign ==
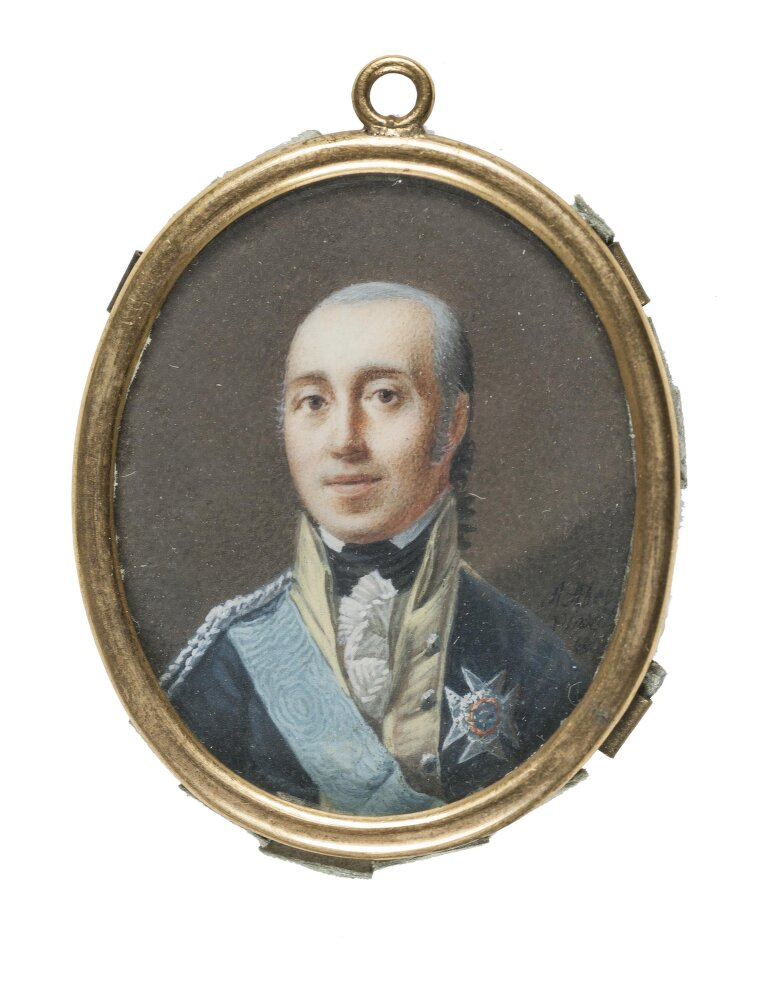
Frederick Francis I, as Duke of Mecklenburg-Schwerin in Swedish uniform with the Royal Order of the Seraphim. Painted by Wilhelm August Christian Abel 1803.

In 1785, Friedrich Franz succeeded his uncle Frederick II as Duke of Mecklenburg-Schwerin.

Following the Napoleonic Wars, Friedrich Franz was raised to the dignity of Grand Duke at the Congress of Vienna. Along with his cousin in Mecklenburg-Strelitz, he was known as one of the most reactionary German rulers.

== Personal life ==
On 1 June 1775 in Gotha, Friedrich Franz married Princess Louise of Saxe-Gotha-Altenburg, the fourth and youngest child of Prince John August of Saxe-Gotha-Altenburg and Countess Louise Reuss of Schleiz. Together, they had eight children, (Note: His eldest daughter, stillborn on 7 May 1776, was buried in the Schelfkirche St. Nikolai of Schwerin. His eldest son, stillborn on 11 May 1777, was also buried in the Schelfkirche St. Nikolai of Schwerin.) including:

- Frederick Louis, Hereditary Grand Duke of Mecklenburg-Schwerin (1778–1819), who married Grand Duchess Elena Pavlovna of Russia, a daughter of Paul I of Russia and Duchess Sophie Marie Dorothea of Württemberg.
- Duchess Louise Charlotte of Mecklenburg-Schwerin (1779–1801), who married Emil Leopold August, Duke of Saxe-Gotha-Altenburg, the second son of Ernst II, Duke of Saxe-Gotha-Altenburg and Princess Charlotte of Saxe-Meiningen.
- Duke Gustav Wilhelm of Mecklenburg-Schwerin (1781–1851), who never married. (Note: Karl Heinrich Ulrichs mentions Duke Gustav Wilhelm as a homosexual.)
- Duke Karl of Mecklenburg-Schwerin (1782–1833).
- Duchess Charlotte Frederica of Mecklenburg-Schwerin (1784–1840), who married Christian VIII of Denmark. They were parents to Frederick VII of Denmark.
- Duke Adolf of Mecklenburg-Schwerin (1785–1821).

On his death in 1837 he was succeeded by his grandson, Grand Duke Paul Friedrich.

== Notes ==
Frederick Francis I House of Mecklenburg-Schwerin Cadet branch of the House of Mecklenburg Born: 10 December 1756 Died: 1 February 1837
Regnal titles
Preceded by Frederick II	Duke of Mecklenburg-Schwerin; 1785–1815	Became Grand Duke
New title Previously duke	Grand Duke of Mecklenburg-Schwerin; 1815–1837	Succeeded by Paul Frederick
