= Christian VIII =

King of Denmark from 1839 to 1848

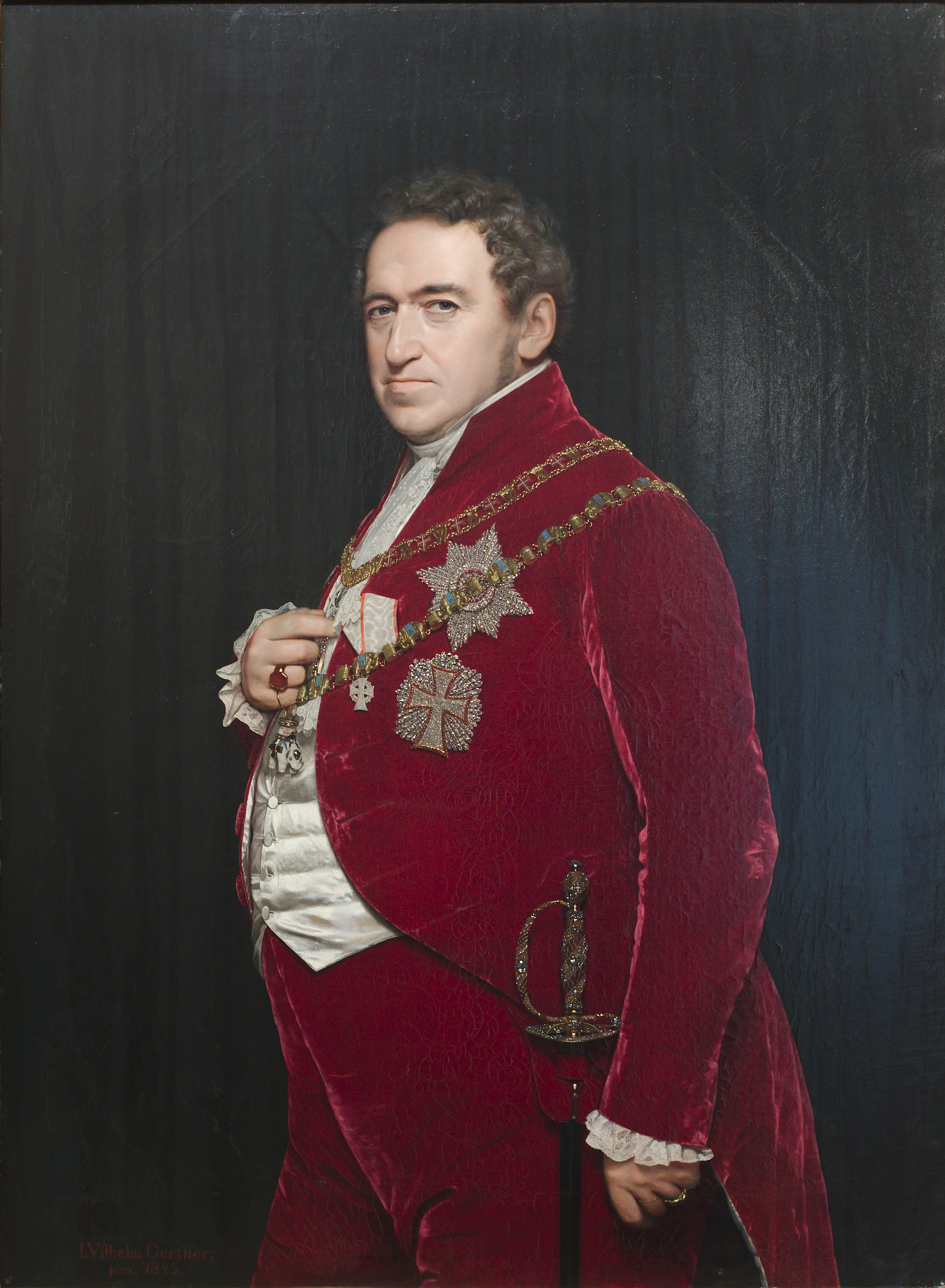
- Portrait by Johan Vilhelm Gertner, 1845

King of Denmark
- Reign: 3 December 1839 – 20 January 1848
- Coronation: 28 June 1840; Frederiksborg Palace Chapel
- Predecessor: Frederick VI
- Successor: Frederick VII

King of Norway
- Reign: 17 May – 10 October 1814
- Predecessor: Frederick VI
- Successor: Charles II
- Born: 18 September 1786; Christiansborg Palace, Copenhagen, Denmark
- Died: 20 January 1848 (aged 61); Amalienborg Palace, Copenhagen, Denmark
- Burial: Roskilde Cathedral
- Spouses: Charlotte Frederica of Mecklenburg-Schwerin (m. 1806; div. 1810) Caroline Amalie of Schleswig-Holstein-Sonderborg-Augustenburg (m. 1815)
- Issue: Frederick VII
Names
- Christian Frederick
- House: Oldenburg
- Father: Frederick, Hereditary Prince of Denmark
- Mother: Duchess Sophia Frederica of Mecklenburg-Schwerin
- Religion: Lutheranism

Christian VIII (18 September 1786 – 20 January 1848) was King of Denmark from 1839 to 1848 and, as Christian Frederick, King of Norway in 1814.

Christian Frederick was the eldest son of Hereditary Prince Frederick, a younger son of King Frederick V of Denmark and Norway. As his cousin Frederick VI had no sons, Christian Frederick was heir presumptive to the throne from 1808.

== Early years ==
=== Birth and family ===
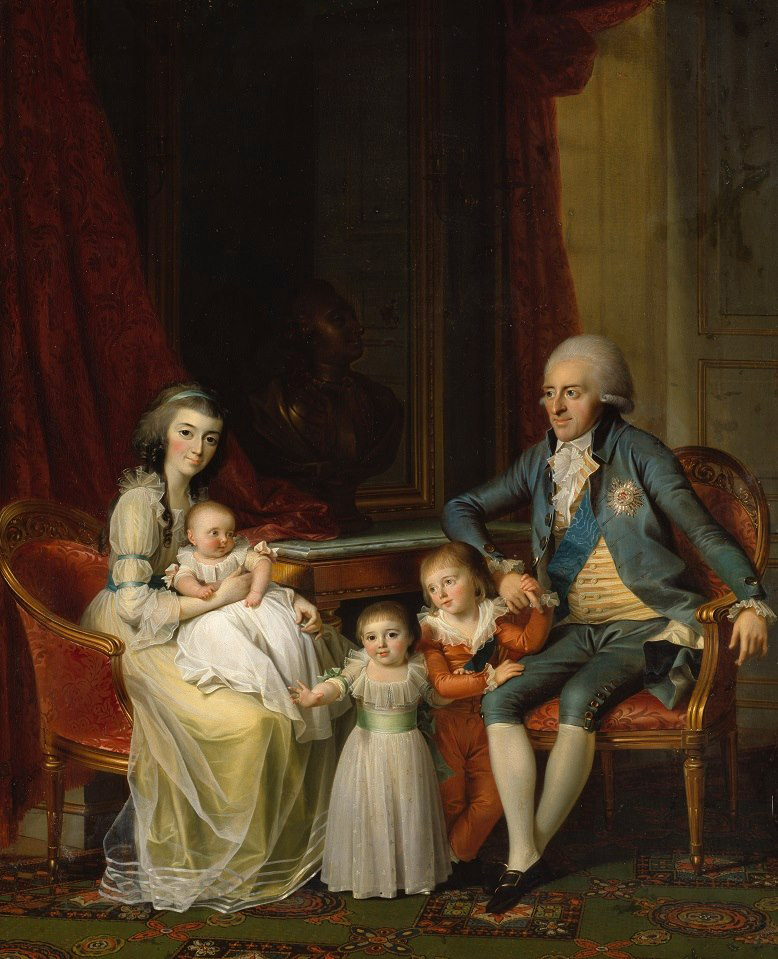
Hereditary Princess Sophia Frederica and Hereditary Prince Frederick with their three eldest children. Prince Christian stands next to his father. Portrait by Jens Juel, 1790.

Prince Christian Frederick of Denmark and Norway was born late in the morning on 18 September 1786 at Christiansborg Palace, the principal residence of the Danish Monarchy on the island of Slotsholmen in central Copenhagen. He was officially the eldest son of Hereditary Prince Frederick of Denmark and Norway and Duchess Sophia Frederica of Mecklenburg-Schwerin. His father was a younger son of the deceased King Frederick V of Denmark-Norway and his second wife, Duchess Juliana Maria of Brunswick-Wolfenbüttel, and his mother was a daughter of Duke Louis of Mecklenburg-Schwerin.

On 28 September 1786, the young prince was baptized with the names Christian Frederick in his mother's chamber at Christiansborg Palace by the royal confessor Christian Bastholm. His godparents were King Christian VII (his uncle), the dowager queen Juliana Maria (his grandmother), Crown Prince Frederick (his cousin), Princess Louise Augusta (his cousin), and Hereditary Prince Frederick Christian of Augustenburg.

In the family, however, it was widely acknowledged that the biological father most likely was the Hereditary Prince's aide-de-camp and hofmarschall Frederick von Blücher, who probably also fathered Christian Frederick's three younger siblings: Princess Juliane Sophie, Princess Louise Charlotte and Prince Frederick Ferdinand. In a letter written by Crown Prince Frederick to his brother-in-law Duke Frederick Christian II of Augustenburg in 1805, he thus mentions the Hereditary Prince's goodwill towards his hofmarschall and continues:

... my uncle appreciates the creator of the four, very adorable princes and princesses too much to want to send him away.

When Prince Christian Frederick was born, his father's half-brother, Christian VII, was the King of Denmark-Norway, but due to the king's mental illness, he was not able to rule himself. From 1772, Hereditary Prince Frederick had ruled together with his mother, the Dowager Queen Juliane Marie, and their adviser Ove Høegh-Guldberg. In 1784, however, the king's only son, the young Crown Prince Frederick (later King Frederick VI), had seized power in a palace revolution and was now the real ruler. In Prince Christian Frederick's childhood, his family had a strained relationship with the Crown Prince and his family as a result of these power struggles, but gradually the relationship between the two branches of the royal family was normalized.

=== Childhood and education ===
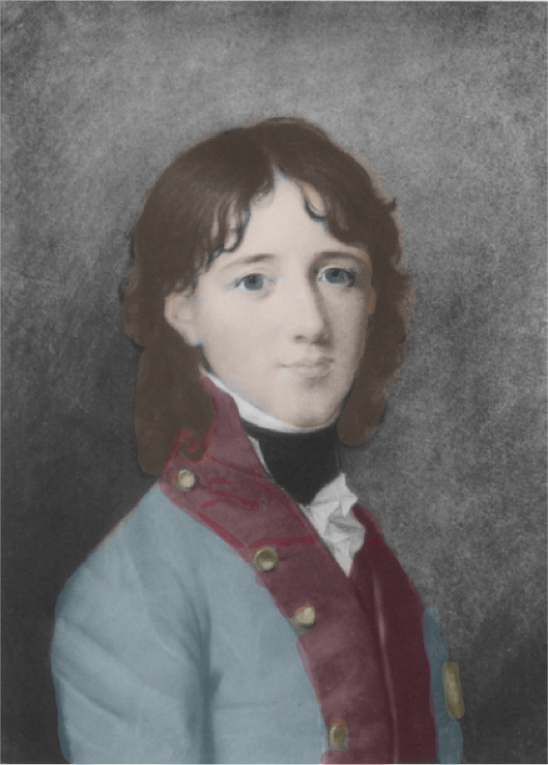
Prince Christian Frederick. Portrait by Jens Juel, 1802.

Prince Christian Frederick spent the first years of his life with his siblings in the vast and magnificent Baroque Christiansborg Palace. As the family's summer residence, Hereditary Prince Friedrich in 1789 bought the smaller and elegant country house, Sorgenfri Palace, on the banks of the small river Mølleåen in Kongens Lyngby, north of Copenhagen. On 26 February 1794, the family lost their Copenhagen home, as Christiansborg Palace was devastated by a fire. Instead the Hereditary Prince bought the Levetzau's Palace, (Note: Today also known as Christian VIII's Palace) an 18th-century town house which forms part of the Amalienborg Palace complex in the district Frederiksstaden in central Copenhagen. In november of the same year, when he was eight years old, his mother, who had long suffered from a fragile health, died at Sorgenfri the age of just 36 years.

Christian Frederick was raised conservatively according to the guidelines of minister Ove Høegh-Guldberg, who had been ousted from government in 1784 along with the hereditary prince. His upbringing was marked by a thorough and broad-spectrum education with exposure to artists and scientists who were linked to his father's court. He inherited the talents of his highly gifted mother, and his love of science and art was instilled at an early age and would follow him throughout his life. His physical appearance is said to have made him very popular in Copenhagen.

He was confirmed on 22 May 1803 in the chapel of Frederiksberg Palace together with his sisters Princess Juliane Sophie and Princess Louise Charlotte. A year and a half later, on 7 December 1805, the children's father, Hereditary Prince Frederick, died at the age of 52, and the nineteen-year-old Prince Christian Frederik inherited his place as second-in-line in the succession as well as the two residences, Levetzau's Palace and Sorgenfri Palace. As King Christian VII died on 13 March 1808, Crown Prince Frederick became king of Denmark and Norway as Frederick VI. Since the new king still had no male descendants, Christian Frederick thus became heir presumptive to the throne.

=== First marriage ===
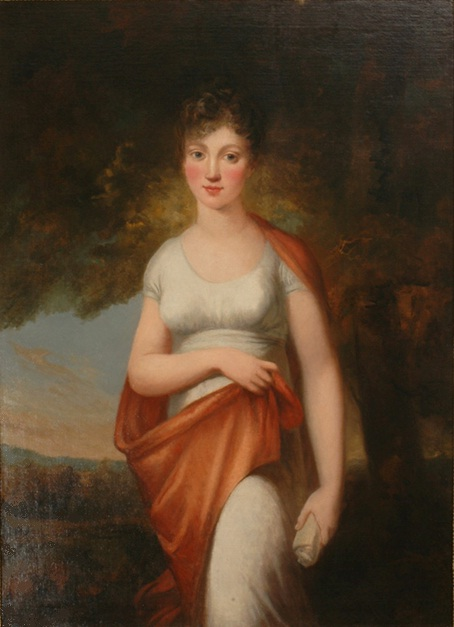
Portrait of Charlotte Frederica by Carl Frederik von Breda c. 1806.

On a visit to his mother's relatives in Mecklenburg, Prince Christian Frederick stayed at his uncle's court in Schwerin, where he fell in love with his cousin, Duchess Charlotte Frederica of Mecklenburg-Schwerin. Charlotte Frederica was a daughter of the reigning Duke Friedrich Franz I of Mecklenburg-Schwerin, and Princess Louise of Saxe-Gotha-Altenburg. They married two years later, on 21 June 1806, at Ludwigslust.

The young couple first settled at Plön Castle in the Duchy of Holstein. It was here, that Charlotte Frederica gave birth to their first-born son, Prince Christian Frederick, who was born and died on 8 April 1807. From 1808 the couple lived in Copenhagen, where they took residence partly at Levetzau's Palace at Amalienborg, and partly at Sorgenfri Palace. On 6 October 1808, their second son and only surviving child was born, Prince Frederick Carl Christian, the future King Frederick VII of Denmark.

Nonetheless, their married life was unhappy. Charlotte Frederica was described as very beautiful in her youth, but her character was thought to be moody, capricious, frivolous and mythomaniac, qualities that were later said to recur in her son, Frederick VII. Her alleged affair with her singing teacher, Swiss-born singer and composer Édouard Du Puy, led to her removal from the court. For this reason, her husband divorced her in 1810, sent her into internal exile in the town of Horsens, and prohibited her from ever seeing her son again.

== King of Norway ==
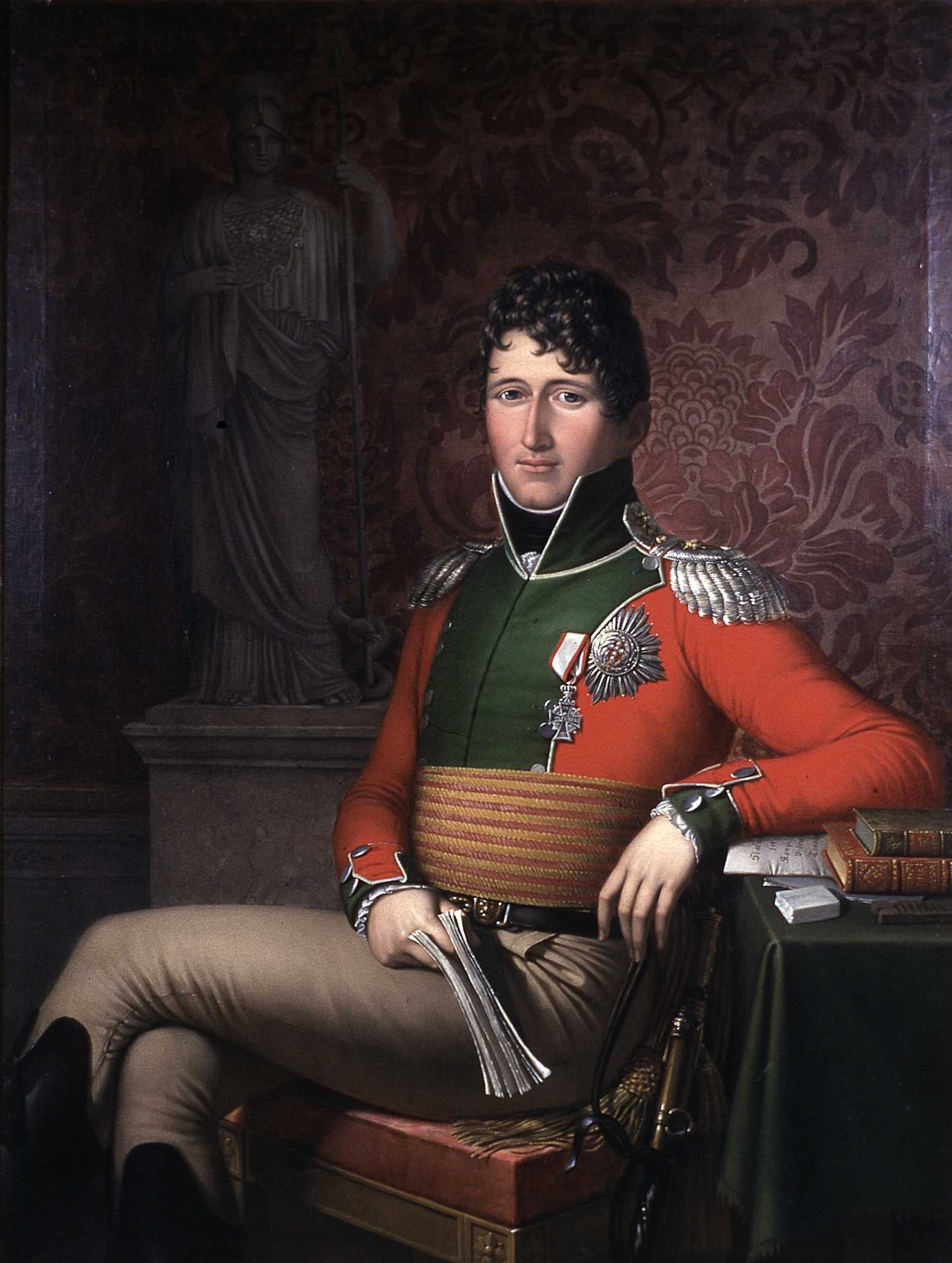
Christian Frederick in 1813, aged 27 years

In May 1813, as the heir presumptive of the kingdoms of Denmark and Norway, Christian was sent as stattholder (Governor-general of Norway) to Norway to promote the loyalty of the Norwegians to the House of Oldenburg, which had been very badly shaken by the disastrous results of Frederick VI's adhesion to the falling fortunes of Napoleon I of France. Christian did all he could personally to strengthen the bonds between the Norwegians and the royal house. Though his endeavours were opposed by the so-called Swedish party, which desired a dynastic union with Sweden, he placed himself at the head of the Norwegian party of independence after the Treaty of Kiel had forced the king to cede Norway to the king of Sweden. He was elected Regent of Norway by an assembly of notables on 16 February 1814.

This election was confirmed by the Norwegian Constituent Assembly convoked at Eidsvoll on 10 April, and on 17 May the constitution was signed and Christian was unanimously elected king of Norway under the name Christian Frederick (Kristian Frederik in Norwegian). Christian next attempted to interest the great powers in Norway's cause, but without success. On being pressed by the commissioners of the allied powers to bring about a union between Norway and Sweden in accordance with the terms of the treaty of Kiel, and then return to Denmark, he replied that, as a constitutional king, he could do nothing without the consent of the parliament (Storting), which would not be convoked until there was a suspension of hostilities on the part of Sweden.

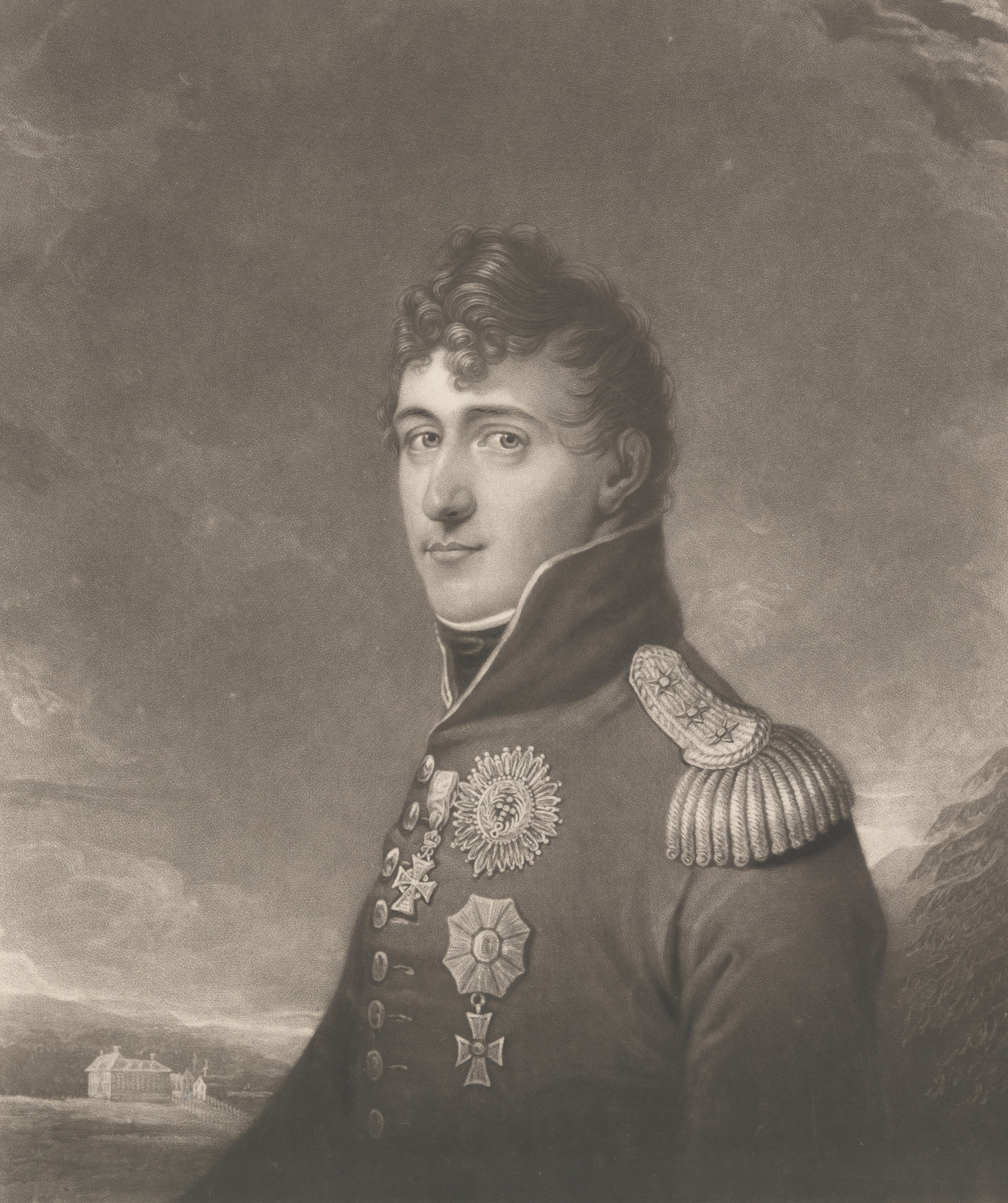
Portrait of Christian Frederick, c. 1814

Sweden refused Christian's conditions and a short military campaign ensued in which the Norwegian army was defeated by the forces of the Swedish crown prince Charles John. The brief war concluded with the Convention of Moss on 14 August 1814. By the terms of this treaty, King Christian Frederick transferred executive power to the Storting, then abdicated the throne and returned to Denmark. The Storting in its turn adopted the constitutional amendments necessary to allow for a personal union with Sweden and on 4 November elected Charles XIII of Sweden as the new king of Norway, Charles II.

== Danish heir presumptive ==
=== Second marriage ===
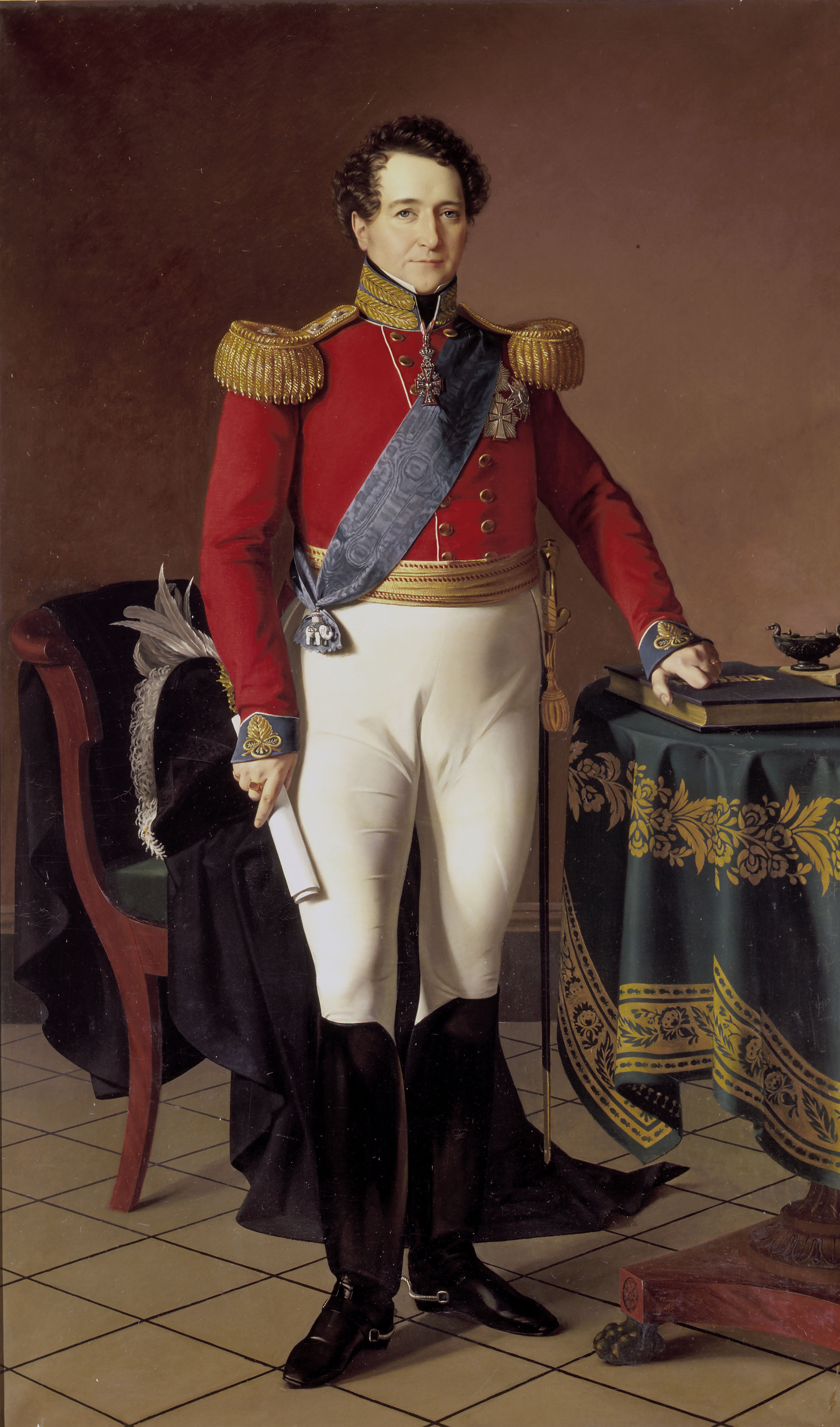
Portrait of Prince Christian as heir presumptive, c. 1831

Upon his return to Denmark, Christian married his second wife, Princess Caroline Amalie of Schleswig-Holstein-Sonderburg-Augustenburg (daughter of Louise Augusta of Denmark, the only sister of Frederick VI) at Augustenborg Palace on 22 May 1815. The couple was childless and lived in comparative retirement as leaders of the literary and scientific society of Copenhagen until Christian ascended the throne of Denmark.

Christian had ten extramarital children, for whom he carefully provided. It has been suggested that these extramarital children included the fairy tale author Hans Christian Andersen, though there is little evidence to support this.

== King of Denmark ==
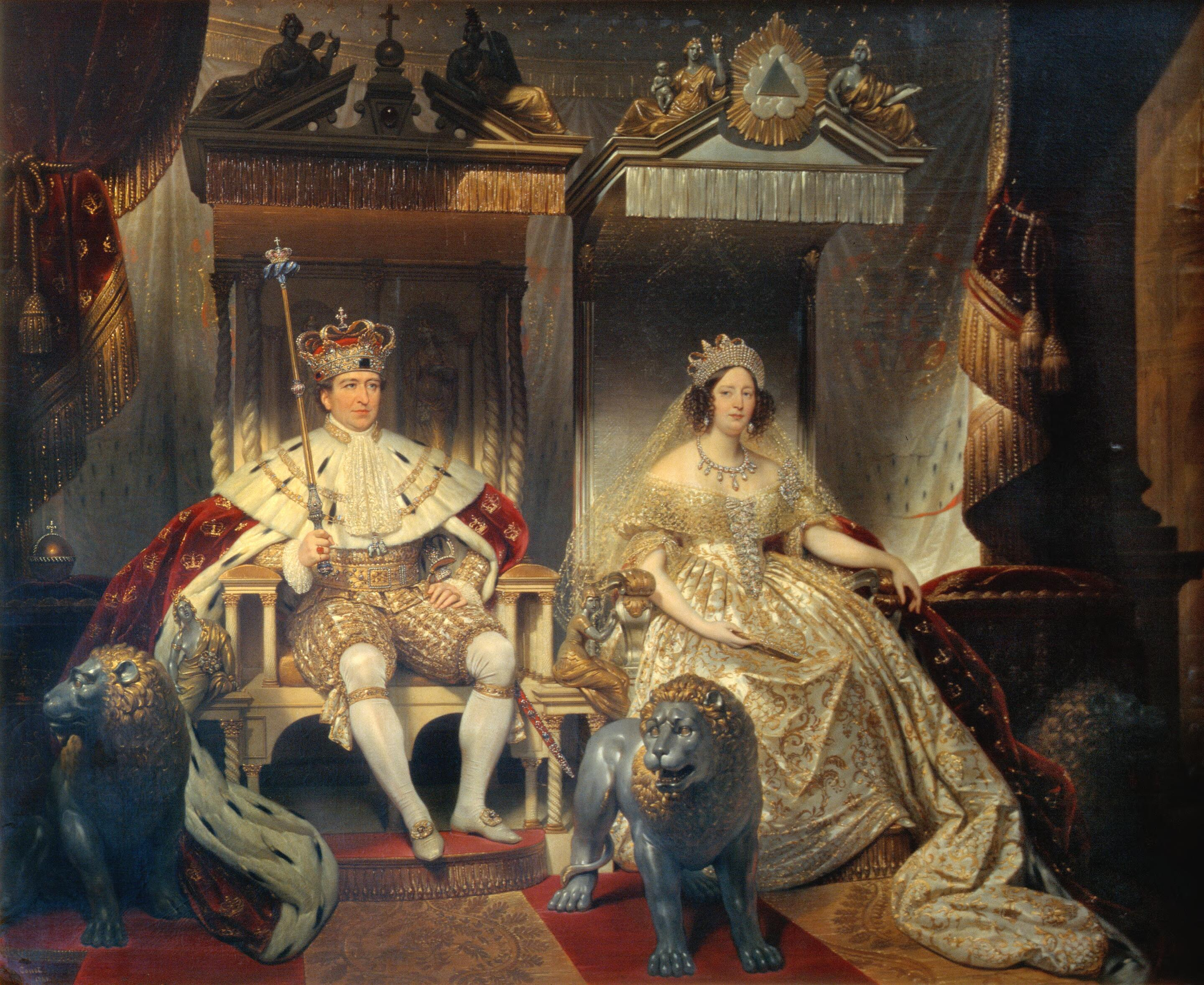
Christian VIII and his consort Caroline Amalie of Augustenborg during his anointing on 28 June 1840 in Frederiksborg Palace Chapel.

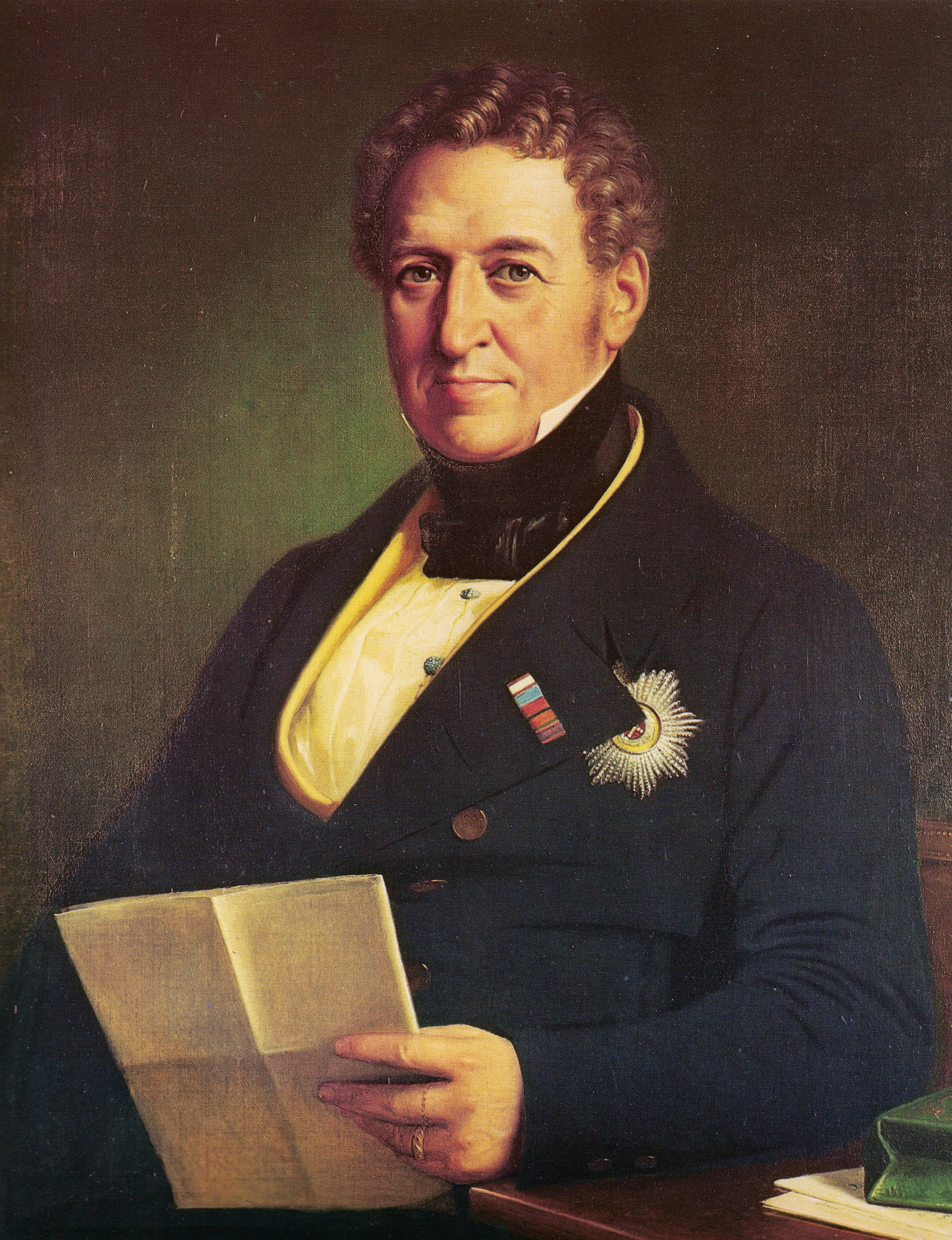
Portrait of Christian VIII, by Wilhelm Marstrand, c. 1843

On 3 December 1839 he ascended the Danish throne as Christian VIII. The Liberal party had high hopes of "the giver of constitutions." However, by this time, Christian had become more conservative, and disappointed his admirers by steadily rejecting every Liberal project. Administrative reform was the only reform he would promise. In his attitude to the growing national unrest in the twin duchies of Schleswig and Holstein he often seemed hesitant and half-hearted, which damaged his position there. It was not until 1846 that he clearly supported the idea of Schleswig being a Danish area.

King Christian VIII continued his predecessor's patronage of astronomy, awarding gold medals for the discovery of comets by telescope and financially supporting Heinrich Christian Schumacher with his publication of the scientific journal Astronomische Nachrichten. It was during his reign that the last remnants of Danish India, namely Tranquebar in the south and Serampore in Bengal, were sold to the British in 1845.

His only legitimate son, the future Frederick VII (1808–1863), was married three times, but produced no legitimate issue. Since he was apparently unlikely to beget heirs, Christian wished to avert a succession crisis. Christian commenced arrangements to secure the succession in Denmark. The result was the selection of the future Christian IX as hereditary prince, the choice made official by a new law enacted on 31 July 1853 after an international treaty made in London.

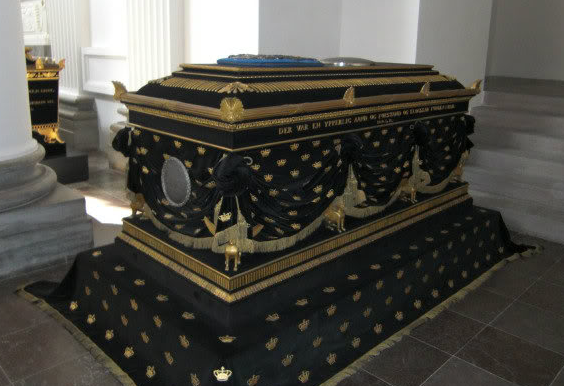
Tomb of Christian VIII, Roskilde Cathedral

King Christian died of sepsis in Amalienborg Palace in 1848 and was interred in Roskilde Cathedral on the island of Zealand, the traditional burial site for Danish monarchs since the 15th century.

Some historians and biographers believe that King Christian would have given Denmark a free constitution had he lived long enough; his last words are sometimes recorded as "I didn't make it" (Jeg nåede det ikke).

== Honours ==
He received the following orders and decorations:

- Denmark:
  - Knight of the Elephant, 16 November 1787
  - Cross of Honour of the Order of the Dannebrog, 10 August 1808
  - Grand Commander of the Order of the Dannebrog, 28 October 1828
- Austrian Empire: Grand Cross of St. Stephen, 1819
- Kingdom of Bavaria: Knight of St. Hubert, 1838
- Belgium: Grand Cordon of the Order of Leopold, 22 November 1843
- Kingdom of France: Grand Cross of the Legion of Honour
- Kingdom of Hanover:
  - Knight of St. George, 1840
  - Grand Cross of the Royal Guelphic Order
- Oldenburg: Grand Cross of the Order of Duke Peter Friedrich Ludwig, with Golden Crown, 6 January 1840
- Kingdom of Portugal: Grand Cross of the Sash of the Three Orders
- Kingdom of Prussia: Knight of the Black Eagle, 13 February 1840
- Russian Empire: Knight of St. Andrew
- Spain: Knight of the Golden Fleece, 13 January 1840
- Sweden-Norway: Knight of the Seraphim, 28 January 1836
- Two Sicilies: Knight of St. Januarius, 1827

== Obituary (astronomy) ==
- MNRAS 8 (1848) 62

Christian VIII of Denmark House of Oldenburg Born: 18 September 1786 Died: 20 January 1848
Regnal titles
Preceded by Frederick VI	King of Denmark; Duke of Schleswig, Holstein & Saxe-Lauenburg; 3 December 1839 – 20 January 1848	Succeeded by Frederick VII
Preceded by Frederick VI	King of Norway; 17 May – 10 October 1814	Succeeded by Charles II
Government offices
Preceded by Frederik of Hesse	Governor-general of Norway; 1 May 1813 – 16 February 1814	Succeeded by Hans Henric von Essen
