= Prince John Augustus of Saxe-Gotha-Altenburg =

German aristocrat

Prince John August
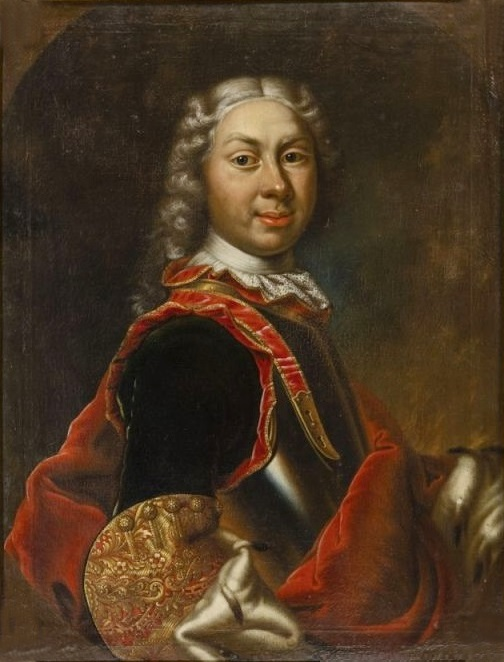
- Born: 17 February 1704; Gotha
- Died: 8 May 1767 (aged 63); Stadtroda
- Spouse: Countess Louise Reuss of Schleiz (m. 1752)
- Issue: Augusta, Princess of Schwarzburg-Rudolstadt; Louise, Duchess of Mecklenburg-Schwerin
- House: House of Saxe-Gotha-Altenburg
- Father: Frederick II, Duke of Saxe-Gotha-Altenburg
- Mother: Magdalene Augusta of Anhalt-Zerbst

Johann August of Saxe-Gotha-Altenburg (17 February 1704 – 8 May 1767) was a German prince, member of the House of Saxe-Gotha-Altenburg.

He was born in Gotha, the fifth but second surviving son of Frederick II, Duke of Saxe-Gotha-Altenburg, and Magdalene Augusta of Anhalt-Zerbst.

== Life ==
In 1725 he entered in the Imperial army and fought in Italy and Hungary. In the Battle of Grocka he was wounded and then spent some time in Altenburg to recover. Later he resumed his military duties and fought in the War of the Austrian Succession in Silesia, Bohemia, Bavaria and the Rhine. He eventually became Imperial Field Marshal and received his own dragoon regiment.

He lived with his family in Stadtroda, where shortly before his death he received a visit from King Frederick the Great of Prussia. He was awarded the Polish Order of the White Eagle.

== Marriage and issue ==
On 6 January 1752 at Roda (Stadtroda after 1925), Johann August married Louise Reuss of Schleiz, co-Countess of Limpurg-Gaildorf since 1734 [as her mother's only surviving child] (Staffelstein, 3 July 1726 – Stadtroda, 28 May 1773), widow of his younger brother Christian Wilhelm. They had four children:

- Augusta (b. Stadtroda, 30 November 1752 – d. Rudolstadt, 28 May 1805), co-Countess of Limpurg-Gaildorf (1773–1780) in succession of her mother jointly with her younger sister; married on 28 November 1780 to Frederick Charles, Prince of Schwarzburg-Rudolstadt.
- Stillborn child (Stadtroda, 18 November 1753).
- Stillborn child (Stadtroda, 27 December 1754).
- Louise (b. Stadtroda, 9 March 1756 – d. Ludwigslust, 1 January 1808), co-Countess of Limpurg-Gaildorf (1773–1780) in succession of her mother jointly with her older sister; married on 1 June 1775 to Frederick Francis I, Duke of Mecklenburg-Schwerin (Grand Duke since 1815). She was a direct ancestress of Prince Albert of Saxe-Coburg and Gotha, later Prince Consort of the United Kingdom, and, through him, a direct ancestress of the present British royal family.

== Ancestors ==
Ancestors of Prince John Augustus of Saxe-Gotha-Altenburg

8. Ernest I, Duke of Saxe-Gotha
4. Frederick I, Duke of Saxe-Gotha-Altenburg
9. Princess Elisabeth Sophie of Saxe-Altenburg
2. Frederick II, Duke of Saxe-Gotha-Altenburg
10. Augustus, Duke of Saxe-Weissenfels
5. Magdalena Sibylle of Saxe-Weissenfels
11. Anna Maria of Mecklenburg-Schwerin
1. Prince John August of Saxe-Gotha-Altenburg
12. John VI, Prince of Anhalt-Zerbst
6. Charles, Prince of Anhalt-Zerbst
13. Sophie Augusta of Holstein-Gottorp
3. Princess Magdalena Augusta of Anhalt-Zerbst
14. Augustus, Duke of Saxe-Weissenfels (= 10)
7. Sophie of Saxe-Weissenfels
15. Anna Maria of Mecklenburg-Schwerin (= 11)
