= Frederick von Blücher =

Frederick William von Blücher
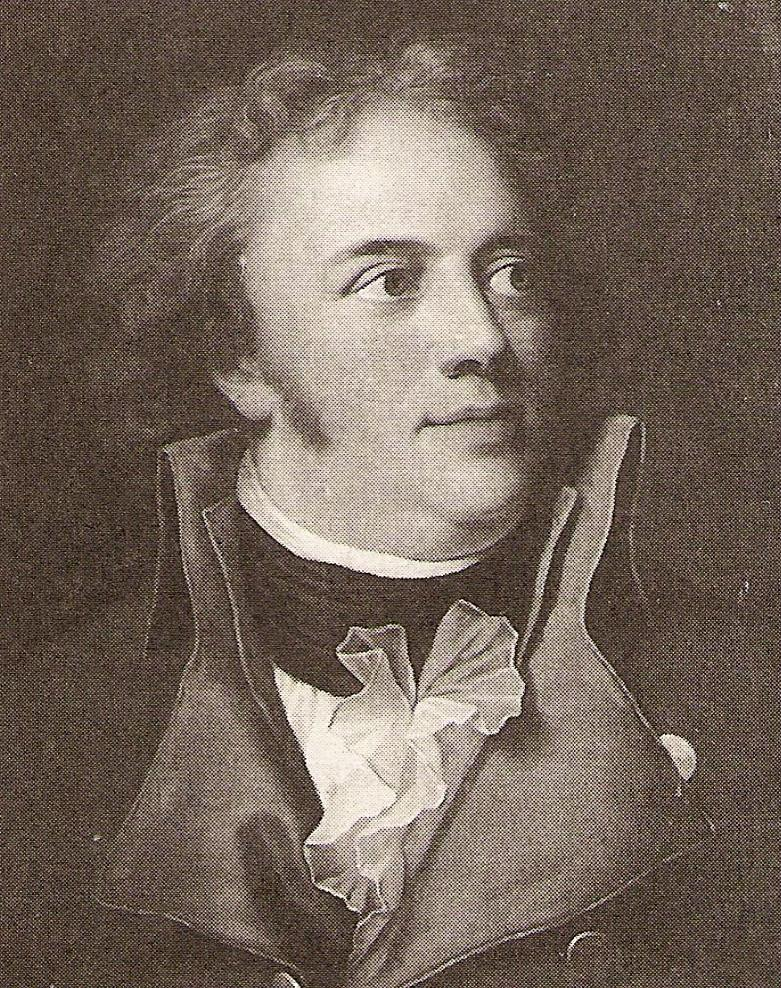
- Frederick von Blücher c. 1790
- Born: 14 January 1760; Penzlin, Duchy of Mecklenburg-Strelitz
- Died: 16 May 1806 (aged 46); Copenhagen, Kingdom of Denmark-Norway
- Issue: Fritz von Blücher; Marie Charlotte Sophie (officially); Christian VIII; Juliane Sophie of Denmark; Louise Charlotte of Denmark; Ferdinand, Hereditary Prince of Denmark (rumored)
- Father: Carl Leopold von Blücher
- Occupation: Courtier

Frederick William von Blücher (Danish: Frederik Vilhelm von Blücher; German: Friedrich Wilhelm von Blücher; 14 January 1760 — 16 May 1806) was a Danish Chamberlain, Lieutenant Colonel, Commander of the Royal Horse Guards, the Adjutant-General to former Hereditary Prince Frederick and Hofmarschall. He was the brother of Gottfried von Blücher (1762–1814) and Conrad von Blücher-Altona (1764–1845), who became chief president of Altona, and father of Fritz von Blücher.

== Biography ==
Frederick William von Blücher was the son of Carl Leopold von Blücher (1719-1775) and Sophie Henriette Margrethe von Plessen (1738-86). Frederick William became Hereditary Princess Sophia Frederica's lover and in the royal family it was generally recognized that the most likely biological father of the Hereditary Princess' four youngest children was Frederikck von Blücher, who was also the aide-de-camp and Hofmarschall for former Hereditary Prince Frederick. In a letter written by Crown Prince Frederick to his brother-in-law Duke Frederick Christian II of Augustenburg in 1805, he thus mentions the former Hereditary Prince's goodwill towards his hofmarschall and continues:

... my uncle appreciates the creator of the four, very adorable princes and princesses too much to want to send him away.

== Issue ==
In 1802, Frederick William married Helene de Thygeson (1776-1839). The couple had two children, the youngest of whom, Fritz von Blücher, was born half a year after Frederick William's death.

Descendants (official and rumored)

Postulated children with Sophia Frederica of Mecklenburg-Schwerin:

- Christian VIII (1786-1848)
- Juliane Sophie of Denmark (1788-1858), married 1812 to Prince Frederik Wilhelm Carl Ludwig of Hesse-Philippsthal-Barchfeld (1786-1834)
- Louise Charlotte of Denmark (1789-1844), married Prince William of Hesse-Kassel
- Ferdinand, Hereditary Prince of Denmark (1792-1863), married Princess Caroline of Denmark

Children with Helene de Thygeson:

- Marie Charlotte Sophie von Blücher (1804-1894), married Frederik von Lowzow (1788-1869)
- Frederik Emanuel Fritz von Blücher (1806-1871)

== See also ==
- Axel von Fersen the Younger
- Johann Friedrich Sruensee
- Gebhard Leberecht von Blücher
