= Princess Juliane Sophie of Denmark =

Juliane Sophie of Denmark
- Princess William of Hesse-Philippsthal-Barchfeld
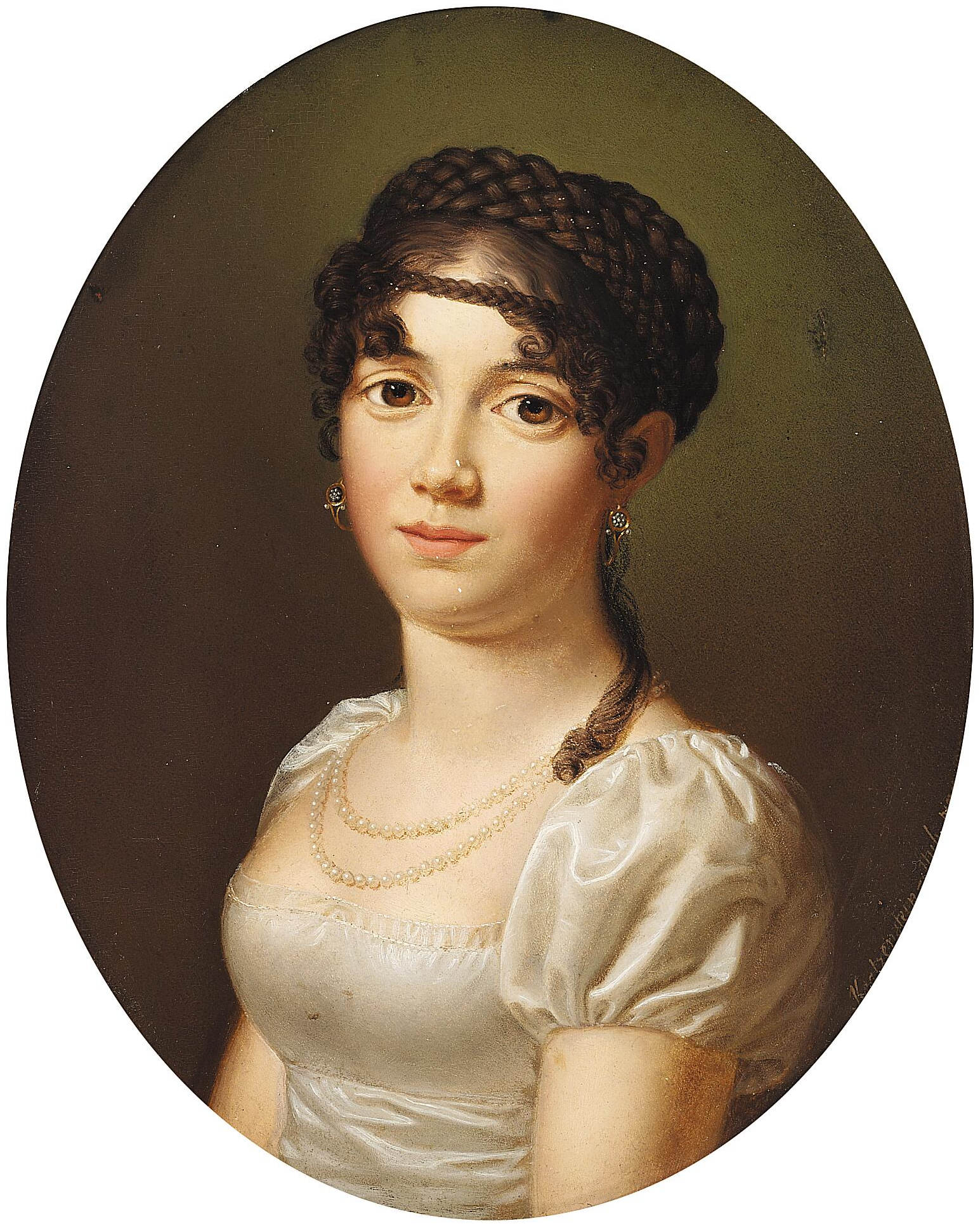
- Portrait by Christian Gottlieb Kratzenstein-Stub, 1812
- Born: 18 February 1788; Copenhagen, Denmark-Norway
- Died: 9 May 1850 (aged 62); Copenhagen, Denmark
- Burial: Roskilde Cathedral
- Spouse: Prince William of Hesse-Philippsthal-Barchfeld
- House: Oldenburg
- Father: Frederick, Hereditary Prince of Denmark (officially); Frederick von Blücher (rumored)
- Mother: Duchess Sophia Frederica of Mecklenburg-Schwerin
- Religion: Lutheranism

Juliane Sophie (18 February 1788, in Copenhagen – 9 May 1850, in Copenhagen) was a Princess of Denmark, the daughter of Frederick, Hereditary Prince of Denmark, who himself was a younger son of King Frederick V of Denmark in his second marriage to queen Juliana Maria of Braunschweig-Wolfenbüttel.

== Family ==
Portrait of young Juliane Sophie, by Jens Juel, 1802.

Princess Juliane Sophie was the oldest daughter and second surviving child of Hereditary Prince Frederick and his wife Duchess Sophia Frederica of Mecklenburg-Schwerin, daughter of Duke Louis of Mecklenburg-Schwerin and Princess Charlotte Sophie of Saxe-Coburg-Saalfeld. Her siblings included the future Christian VIII of Denmark.

Prince Frederick and Princess Sophia Frederica did not have any surviving children in the first 10 years of marriage, but eventually they had four children.

The actual paternity of Princess Juliane and her three siblings has been debated, and it is widely believed that the father of Sophia Frederica's children was Prince Frederick's adjutant, Frederick von Blücher.

== Early years ==
When Juliane was born her half-uncle king Christian VII of Denmark was the reigning monarch, but the actual ruler was her half-cousin the Crown Prince, the future king Frederick VI of Denmark.

A few years prior to Juliane's birth the control of the kingdom had been in the hands of her grandmother Queen Dowager Juliana Maria, whom she was named after, and her father, but a coup by the Crown Prince had deprived her family of the power. When Juliane was a child, there was still a lot of tension between the two branches of the royal family because of the coup, but eventually they made up and intermarried within each other.

For the first years of her life Juliane lived with the rest of the royal family at Christiansborg Palace, but after the palace was destroyed by fire in 1794, Hereditary Prince Frederick moved with his family to a mansion at Amalienborg Palace. Her mother Sophia Frederica died the same year, shortly after the move.

In 1803, Juliane had her confirmation together with her brother Christian (VIII) and sister, Princess Louise Charlotte of Denmark at the chapel at Frederiksberg Palace, the summer residence of the royal family.

== Marriage ==
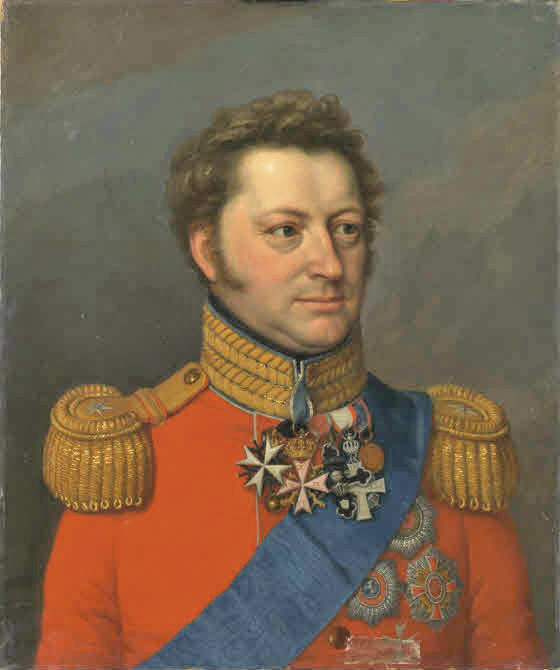
Wilhelm of Hesse-Philippsthal-Barchfeld, husband of Princess Juliane Sophie

On 22 August 1812, at Frederiksberg Palace, Juliane Sophie married Landgrave Wilhelm of Hesse-Philippsthal-Barchfeld, (Barchfeld, 10 August 1786 – Copenhagen, 30 November 1834). Wilhelm was the son of Adolph, Landgrave of Hesse-Philippsthal-Barchfeld and Princess Louise of Saxe-Meiningen.

Wilhelm lived in Denmark from a young age and had a successful military career, and was a popular and respected man in the Danish capital.

The marriage was happy and was founded on genuine feelings from both parties. The couple however didn't have any children, apparently because Juliane was afraid of dying in childbirth. Wilhelm instead had a mistress with whom he had five daughters. The couple had a mansion in Copenhagen and as a summer residence they had Fredensborg Palace north of the capital.

== Danish throne and the succession ==
King Frederick VI didn't have any sons, so it became clear that the Danish throne would be inherited by Juliane's oldest brother Prince Christian. In 1821 she along with her branch of the royal family were elevated to the style of Royal Highness instead of Highness which was the normal style for the children of younger sons of the Danish kings.

When Juliane's childless nephew, Frederick VII of Denmark became king in 1848 she was second in-line to the throne after her childless brother, Ferdinand, Hereditary Prince of Denmark who was the only male left in the royal family besides the king. However, there was already political talks about securing the Danish monarchy, which consisted of several states which had different laws regarding female succession, by giving the throne to a person that could keep the different parts together and Juliane accepted this.

Juliane died in 1850, shortly before the succession was settled on her sister's son-in-law, the future Christian IX of Denmark.

== Ancestry ==
Ancestors of Princess Juliane Sophie of Denmark

8. Christian VI of Denmark
4. Frederick V of Denmark
9. Princess Sophie Magdalene of Brandenburg-Kulmbach
2. Frederick, Hereditary Prince of Denmark
10. Ferdinand Albert II, Duke of Brunswick-Wolfenbüttel
5. Duchess Juliana Maria of Brunswick-Wolfenbüttel
11. Duchess Antoinette of Brunswick-Wolfenbüttel
1. Princess Juliane Sophie of Denmark
12. Christian Ludwig II, Duke of Mecklenburg-Schwerin
6. Duke Louis of Mecklenburg-Schwerin
13. Duchess Gustave Caroline of Mecklenburg-Strelitz
3. Duchess Sophia Frederica of Mecklenburg-Schwerin
14. Francis Josias, Duke of Saxe-Coburg-Saalfeld
7. Princess Charlotte Sophie of Saxe-Coburg-Saalfeld
15. Princess Anna Sophie of Schwarzburg-Rudolstadt
