= Duchess Sophia Frederica of Mecklenburg-Schwerin =

Sophia Frederica of Mecklenburg-Schwerin
- Hereditary Princess of Denmark and Norway
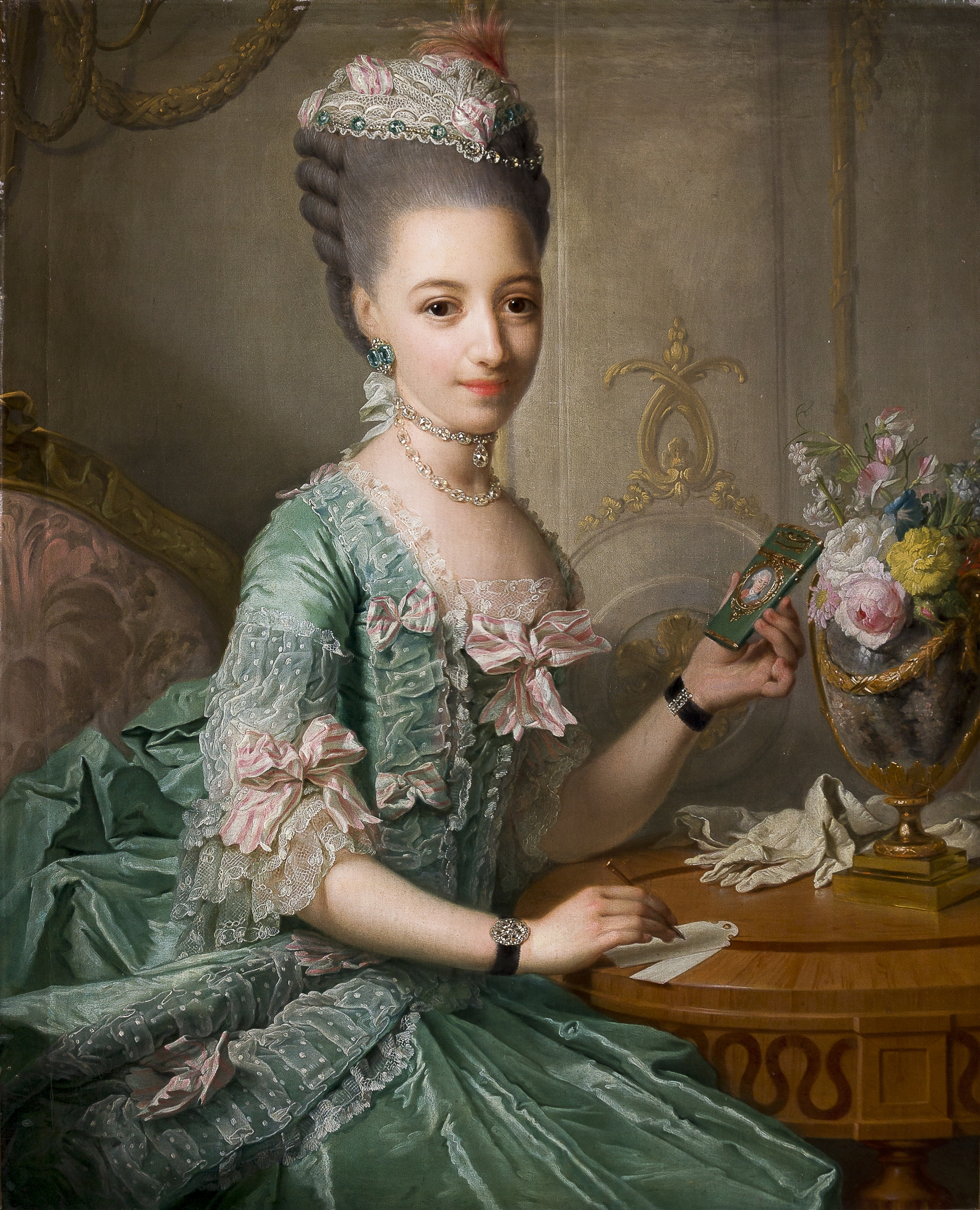
- Portrait by Georg David Matthieu, c. 1774.
- Born: 24 August 1758; Schwerin
- Died: 29 November 1794 (aged 36); Sorgenfri Palace, near Copenhagen
- Burial: Roskilde Cathedral
- Spouse: Frederick, Hereditary Prince of Denmark and Norway (m. 1774)
- Issue: Princess Juliana Marie; Christian VIII of Denmark; Juliane Sophie, Princess William of Hesse-Philippsthal-Barchfeld; Louise Charlotte, Princess of Hesse-Kassel; Ferdinand, Hereditary Prince of Denmark
- House: Mecklenburg
- Father: Louis, Hereditary Prince of Mecklenburg-Schwerin
- Mother: Princess Charlotte Sophie of Saxe-Coburg-Saalfeld

Sophia Frederica of Mecklenburg-Schwerin (24 August 1758 – 29 November 1794) was born a Princess and Duchess of Mecklenburg-Schwerin, and by marriage Hereditary Princess of Denmark and Norway.

== Life ==
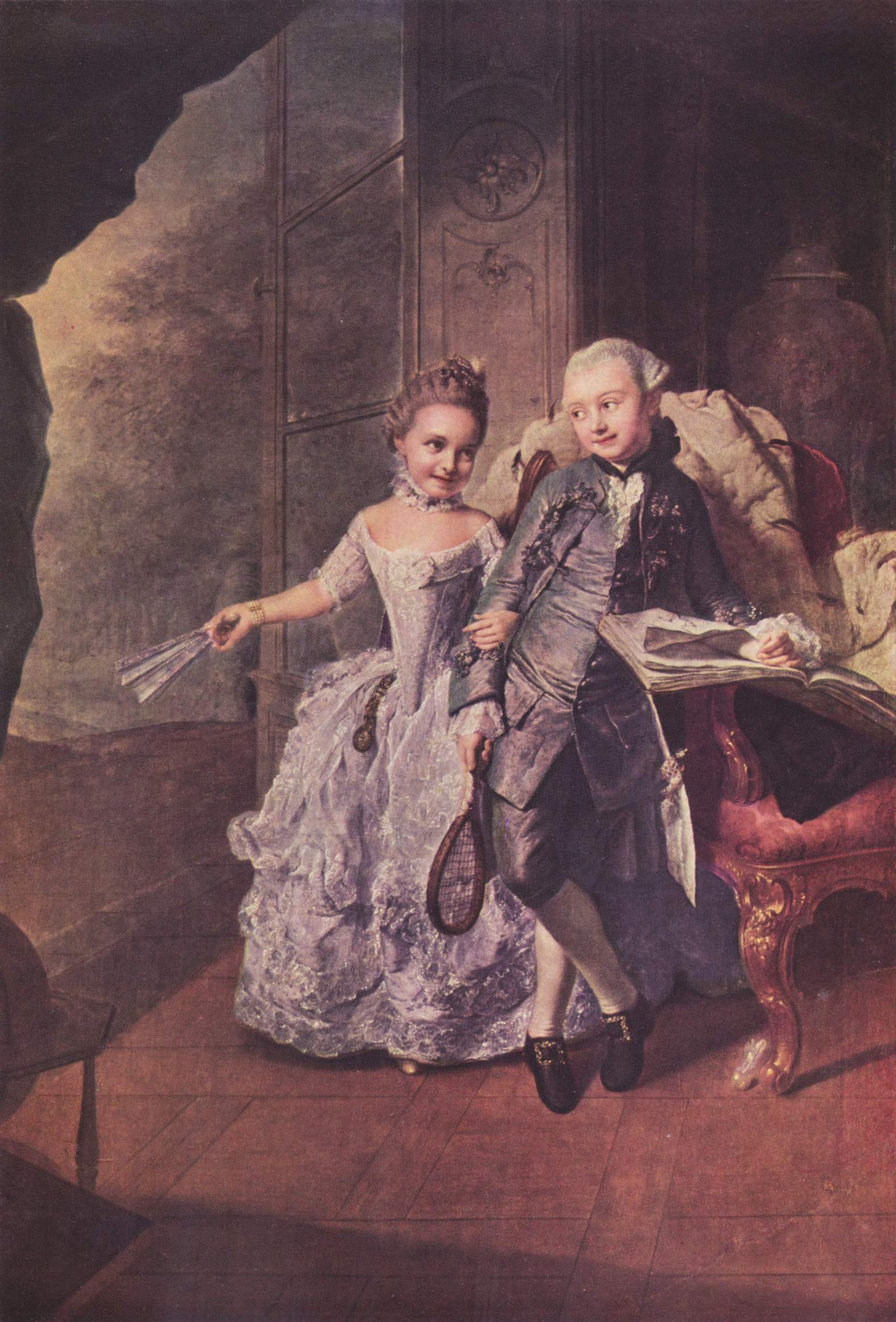
Duchess Sophia Frederica and her brother Duke Frederick, by Georg David Matthieu, 1764

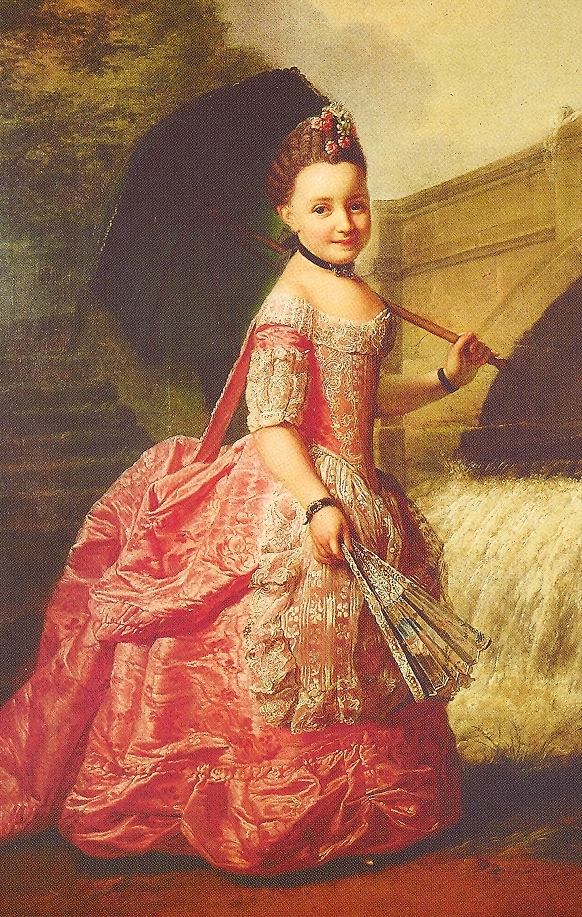
Duchess Sophia Frederica of Mecklenburg, by Georg David Matthieu, 1765

=== Family ===
Born in Schwerin, she was the only daughter of Ludwig, Hereditary Prince of Mecklenburg-Schwerin, second son of Christian Louis II, Duke of Mecklenburg-Schwerin, and Princess Charlotte Sophie of Saxe-Coburg-Saalfeld. Her only sibling was Frederick, who was about two years older.

=== Life in Denmark ===
On 21 October 1774 in Copenhagen, she married Hereditary Prince Frederick of Denmark and Norway, the son of King Frederick V of Denmark and his second wife Juliane Marie of Brunswick-Wolfenbüttel, who was the regent in Denmark between 1772 and 1784. She was sixteen years old when she was married.

Sophia Frederica, known as Sofie Frederikke af Mecklenburg-Schwerin in Denmark, was described as jolly, charming and intelligent. She had a hard time in the beginning adapting to her new, stiffer environment, but became quite popular. During the first ten years of her marriage (1774-1784), she gave birth to three daughters, the eldest two were stillborn and the third lived only five months; it was only in 1786 when she had the first of her living children, the future King Christian VIII.

It is said she was disappointed when she met her husband for the first time, but they came to be fond of each other, although they both supposedly took lovers; her husband had a mistress, her companion Caja Hviid, while the father of Sophia Frederica's children was rumored to be her husband's adjutant, Frederik von Blücher. It was said that the harmony of their marriage was based on mutual understanding. The harmonious friendship between the spouses created a fear that Sophia Frederica's influence over her husband would lead to her interfering in politics.

She died in Sorgenfri Palace.

== Issue ==
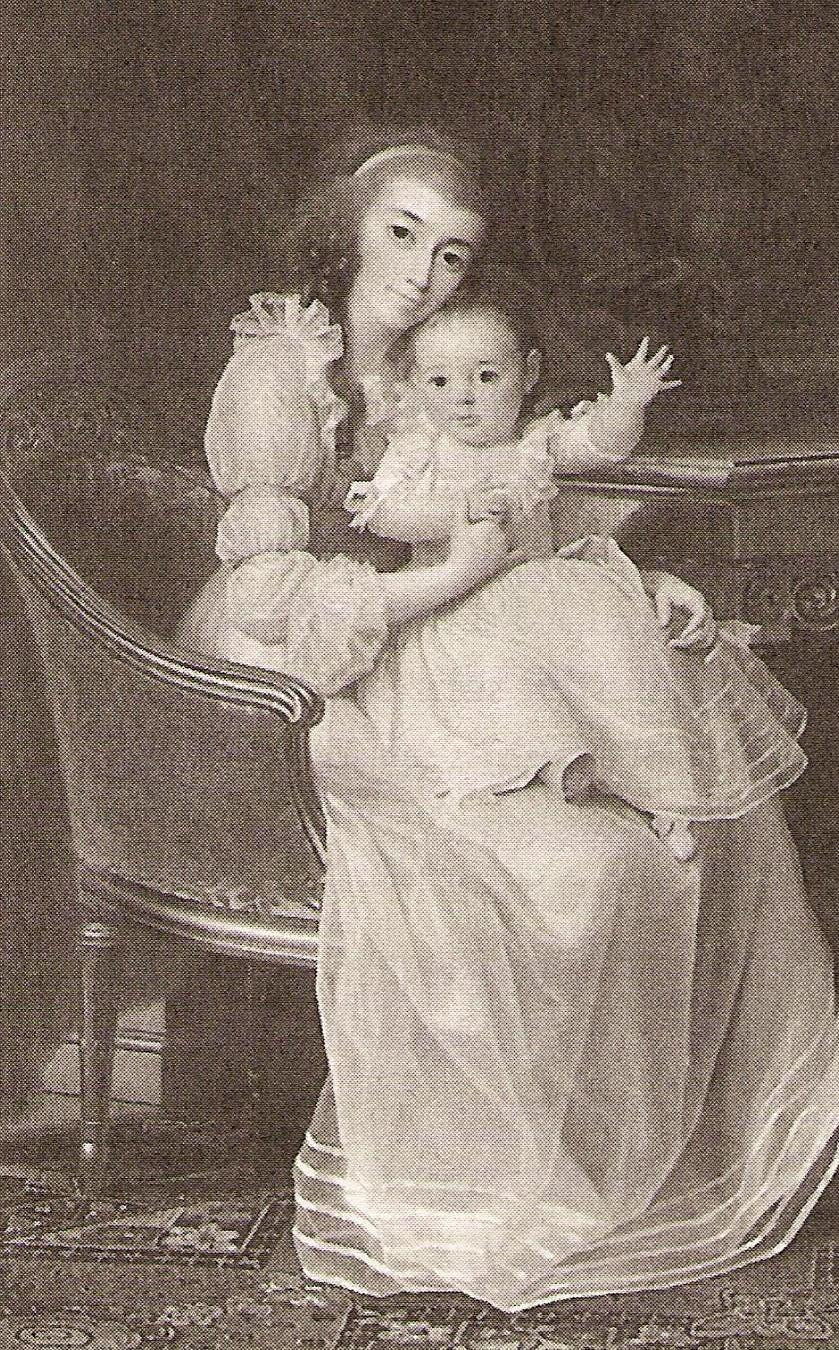
Sophia Frederica, Hereditary Princess of Denmark and Norway, with her daughter Louise Charlotte, by Jens Juel, 1790

Sophia Frederica and Prince Frederick had the following children:

- Stillborn daughter (19 September 1781).
- Stillborn daughter (17 February 1783).
- Princess Juliana Marie (2 May 1784 - 28 October 1784), died in infancy.
- Prince Christian Frederick (18 September 1786 - 20 January 1848), future King Christian Frederick of Norway and Christian VIII of Denmark.
- Princess Juliane Sophie (18 February 1788 - 9 May 1850), married in 1812 to Prince William of Hesse-Philippsthal-Barchfeld; they had no issue.
- Princess Louise Charlotte (30 October 1789 - 28 March 1864), married in 1810 to Prince William of Hesse-Cassel; they had issue.
- Hereditary Prince Ferdinand (22 November 1792 - 29 June 1863), married in 1829 to Princess Caroline of Denmark; they had no issue.

== Ancestry ==
Ancestors of Duchess Sophia Frederica of Mecklenburg-Schwerin

8. Frederick, Duke of Mecklenburg-Grabow
4. Christian Ludwig II, Duke of Mecklenburg-Schwerin
9. Landgravine Christine Wilhelmine of Hesse-Homburg
2. Duke Louis of Mecklenburg-Schwerin
10. Adolphus Frederick II, Duke of Mecklenburg-Strelitz
5. Duchess Gustave Caroline of Mecklenburg-Strelitz
11. Duchess Marie of Mecklenburg-Güstrow
1. Duchess Sophia Frederica of Mecklenburg-Schwerin
12. John Ernest IV, Duke of Saxe-Coburg-Saalfeld
6. Francis Josias, Duke of Saxe-Coburg-Saalfeld
13. Countess Charlotte Johanna of Waldeck-Wildungen
3. Princess Charlotte Sophie of Saxe-Coburg-Saalfeld
14. Louis Frederick I, Prince of Schwarzburg-Rudolstadt
7. Anna Sophie of Schwarzburg-Rudolstadt
15. Anna Sophie of Saxe-Gotha-Altenburg
