= Frederick VI of Denmark =

King of Denmark (1808–39) and Norway (1808–14)

Frederick VI
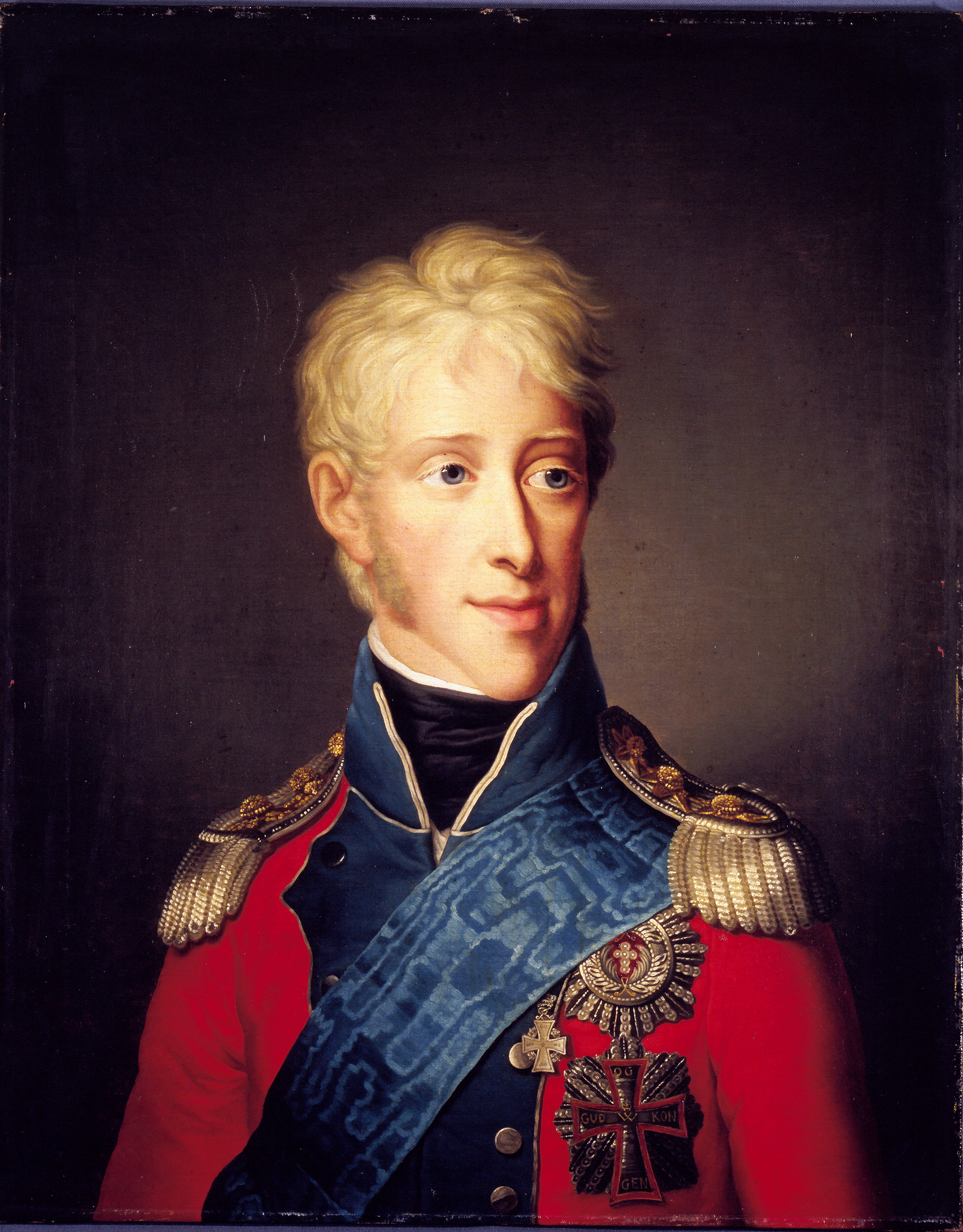
- Portrait by Friedrich Carl Gröger, 1808

King of Denmark
- Reign: 13 March 1808 – 3 December 1839
- Coronation: 31 July 1815; Frederiksborg Palace Chapel
- Predecessor: Christian VII
- Successor: Christian VIII
- Chief Ministers: See list: Christian Günther von Bernstorff Frederik Moltke Joachim Godske Moltke Ernst Heinrich von Schimmelmann Otto Joachim Moltke

King of Norway
- Reign: 13 March 1808 – 7 February 1814
- Predecessor: Christian VII
- Successor: Christian Frederick

Crown Prince-Regent of Denmark-Norway
- Tenure: 14 April 1784 – 13 March 1808
- Predecessor: Hereditary Prince Frederick
- Monarch: Christian VII
- Born: 28 January 1768; Christiansborg Palace, Copenhagen, Denmark
- Died: 3 December 1839 (aged 71); Amalienborg Palace, Copenhagen, Denmark
- Burial: Roskilde Cathedral
- Spouse: Marie of Hesse-Kassel (m. 1790)
- Issue: Princess Caroline; Princess Vilhelmine Marie; Frederik W. Dannemand (illegitimate)
- House: Oldenburg
- Father: Christian VII of Denmark
- Mother: Caroline Matilda of Great Britain

Frederick VI (Danish and Norwegian: Frederik; 28 January 1768 – 3 December 1839) was King of Denmark from 13 March 1808 until his death in 1839 and King of Norway from 13 March 1808 to 7 February 1814. He was the last king of Denmark–Norway. From 1784 until his accession, he served as regent during his father's mental illness and was referred to as the "Crown Prince Regent" (Norwegian: kronprinsregent). For his motto he chose God and the just cause (Danish: Gud og den retfærdige sag). Instead of the customary Latin, he used Danish, which established a precedent for later Danish kings who used Danish as well.

Born in Christiansborg Palace, Copenhagen, Frederick VI was the eldest of two children and the only son of Christian VII and Caroline Mathilde. In 1790, Frederick VI married Marie Sophie. Together, they had eight children, though only two daughters, Princess Caroline and Princess Wilhelmine, survived to adulthood. Additionally, He was the last Danish king to have an official mistress, Frederikke Dannemand, with whom he had five children.

His tenure as regent is highlighted by the abolition of stavnsbånd, the end of hanging as a capital punishment in the kingdom, and the withdrawal of Dano-Norwegian involvement in the transatlantic slave trade. Other significant events during his time as regent include the Battle of Copenhagen of 1801 and the Battle of Copenhagen of 1807. His reign as king is highlighted by his patronage of astronomy, the introduction of Primary school, the creation of the Assemblies of Estate, and the ensurement of full Civil rights to the Jews. Other significant events during his reign as king include the end of the Napoleonic Wars, the Congress of Vienna, the loss of Norway, and an economic depression.

With no surviving legitimate sons, Frederick VI was succeeded by his half-cousin, Christian.

== Early life ==
=== Birth and family ===
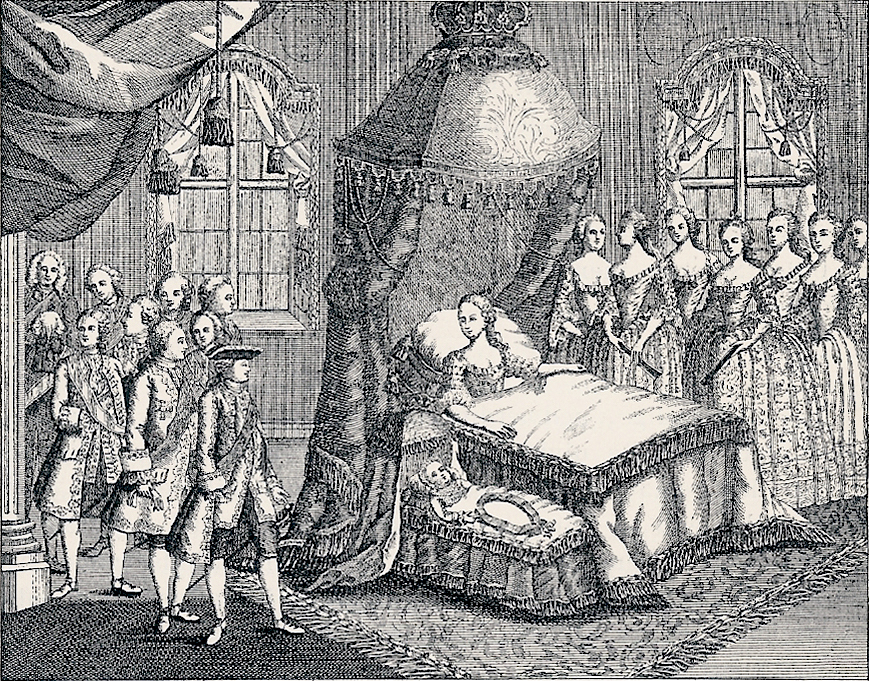
The newborn prince with his mother Queen Caroline Matilda

The future King Frederick VI was born between 10 and 11 p.m. on 28 January 1768 in the Queen's Bedchamber at Christiansborg Palace, the royal residence in central Copenhagen. He was the first child born to King Christian VII and Queen Caroline Mathilde of Denmark and Norway. He was born 15 months after his parents' wedding, the day before his father's 19th birthday, and while his mother was just 16 years old. The King had shown little interest in the Queen after the marriage and only reluctantly visited her in her chambers. The King's advisors had to step in, among other things with love letters written in the King's name, in an attempt to make the marriage lead to a pregnancy and thus an heir to the throne.

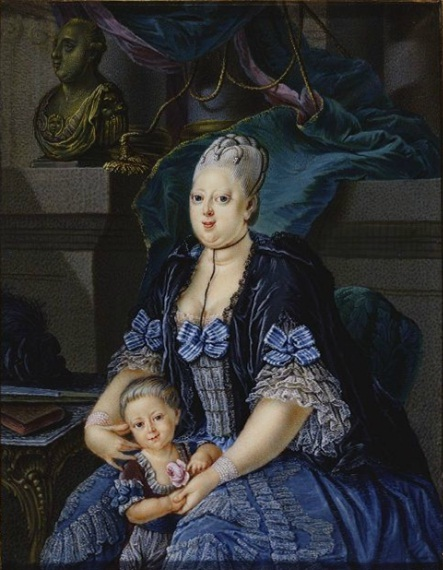
Crown Prince Frederick with his mother Queen Caroline Matilda. Watercolor on ivory by Carl Daniel Voigts, 1773 (The Royal Collection).

The young prince was baptised already two days after the birth on 30 January at Christiansborg Palace by the royal confessor Ludvig Harboe, Bishop of Zealand, and was named after his late grandfather, King Frederick V. His godparents were King Christian VII (his father), the dowager queen Juliana Maria (his step-grandmother) and his half-uncle, Hereditary Prince Frederick.

=== Childhood and upbringing ===
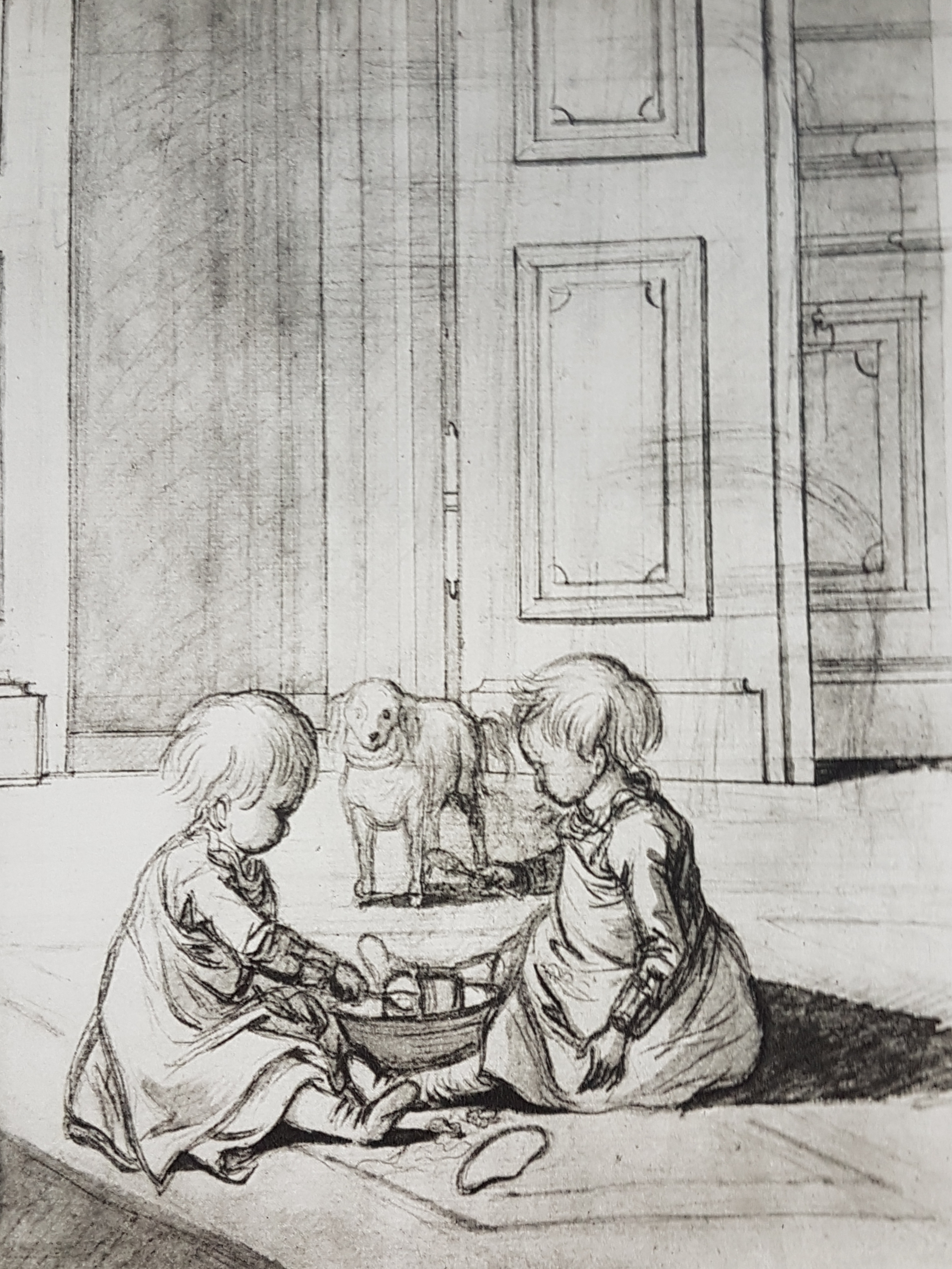
Crown Prince Frederick with a playmate. Drawing by Johan Edvard Mandelberg.

At the time of Crown Prince Frederick's birth, conditions at the Danish court were characterized by Christian VII's increasing mental illness, including suspected schizophrenia expressed by catatonic periods. In the resulting intrigues and power struggles which followed, Christian's personal physician, the progressive and radical thinker Johann Friedrich Struensee, became the King's advisor and rose steadily in power during the late 1760s, and from 1770 to 1772, Struensee was de facto regent of the country. Struensee soon also became the confidant of Queen Caroline Mathilde, Frederick's mother, partly because during a smallpox epidemic in the autumn of 1769, in which over 1,000 children died, he successfully inoculated Crown Prince Frederick with good results. In doing so, Struensee won the gratitude and trust of the neglected Queen and soon became her lover as well. It is widely believed that Struensee was also the biological father of Prince Frederick's only sister Princess Louise Augusta, who was born in 1771.

Both the Queen and Struensee were ideologically influenced by Enlightenment thinkers such as Voltaire and Jean-Jacques Rousseau. Therefore, the Queen also fully approved the harsh education recommended by Struensee for the Crown Prince, who was perceived as weak and needed to be strengthened physically and mentally. While Struensee was in power, the young Frederick was raised at Hirschholm Palace following an interpretation of the educational approach advocated by Rousseau in his famous work Émile. Instead of receiving direct instruction, Frederick was expected to learn everything through his own efforts through playing with two commoner boys as per Struensee's instructions.

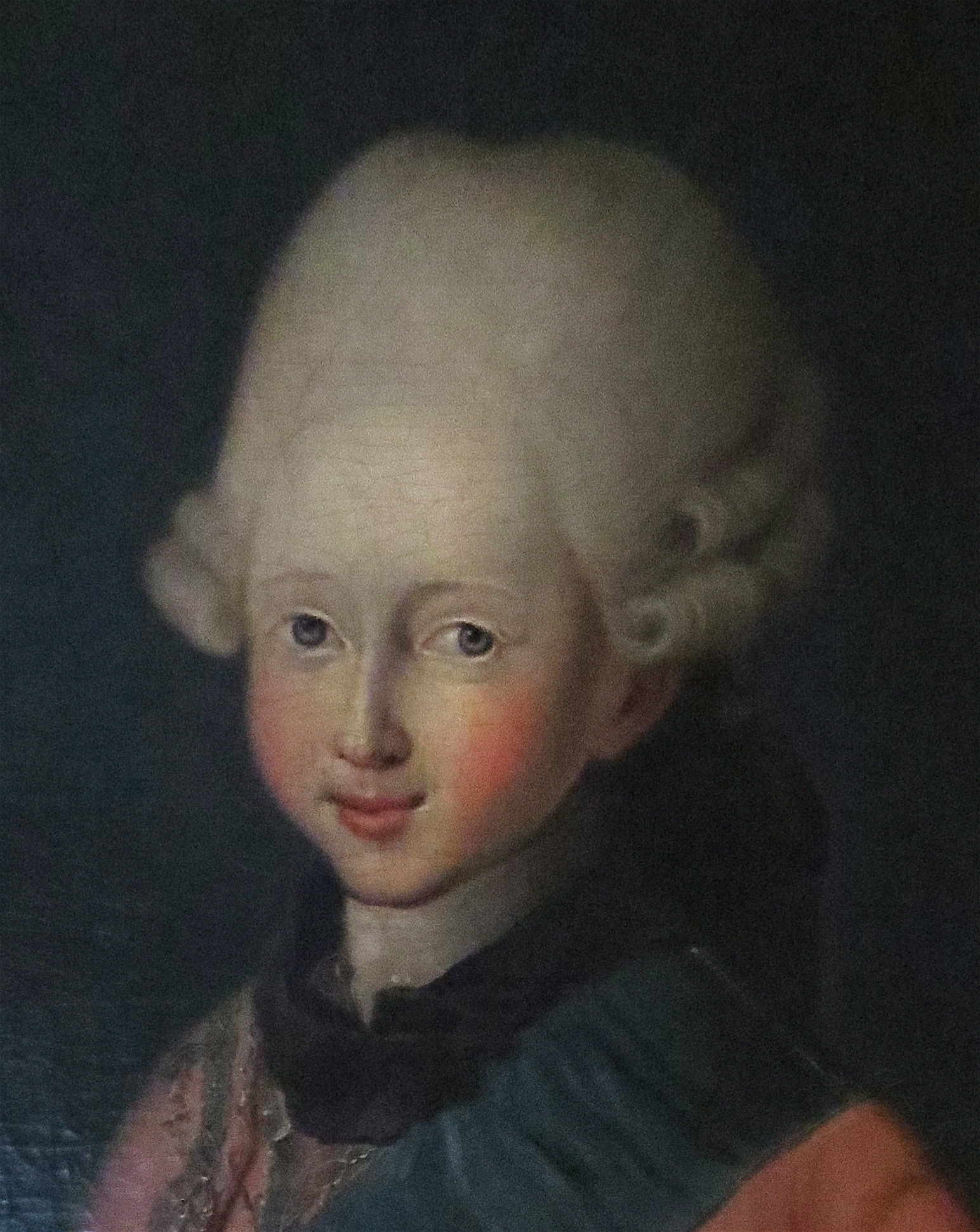
Crown Prince Frederick 6 years old.

The general ill will against Struensee found expression in a conspiracy against him in the name of the Queen Dowager Juliana Maria, and in the early morning of 17 January 1772 Struensee was deposed in a palace coup. Struensee was later executed, while the King and Queen were divorced. Queen Caroline Mathilde was exiled, and the four-year-old Frederick and his sister were left behind, never to see their mother again. After the revolt against Struensee, Frederick's 18-year-old half-uncle Hereditary Prince Frederick was made regent. The real power, however, was held by Hereditary Prince Frederick's mother (Crown Prince Frederick's step-grandmother), Queen Dowager Juliana Maria, aided by Ove Høegh-Guldberg. Frederick was raised under the supervision of Margrethe Marie Thomasine Numsen and then under his chamberlain, Johan Bülow.

== Crown prince's regency ==
=== Coup d'état in 1784 ===
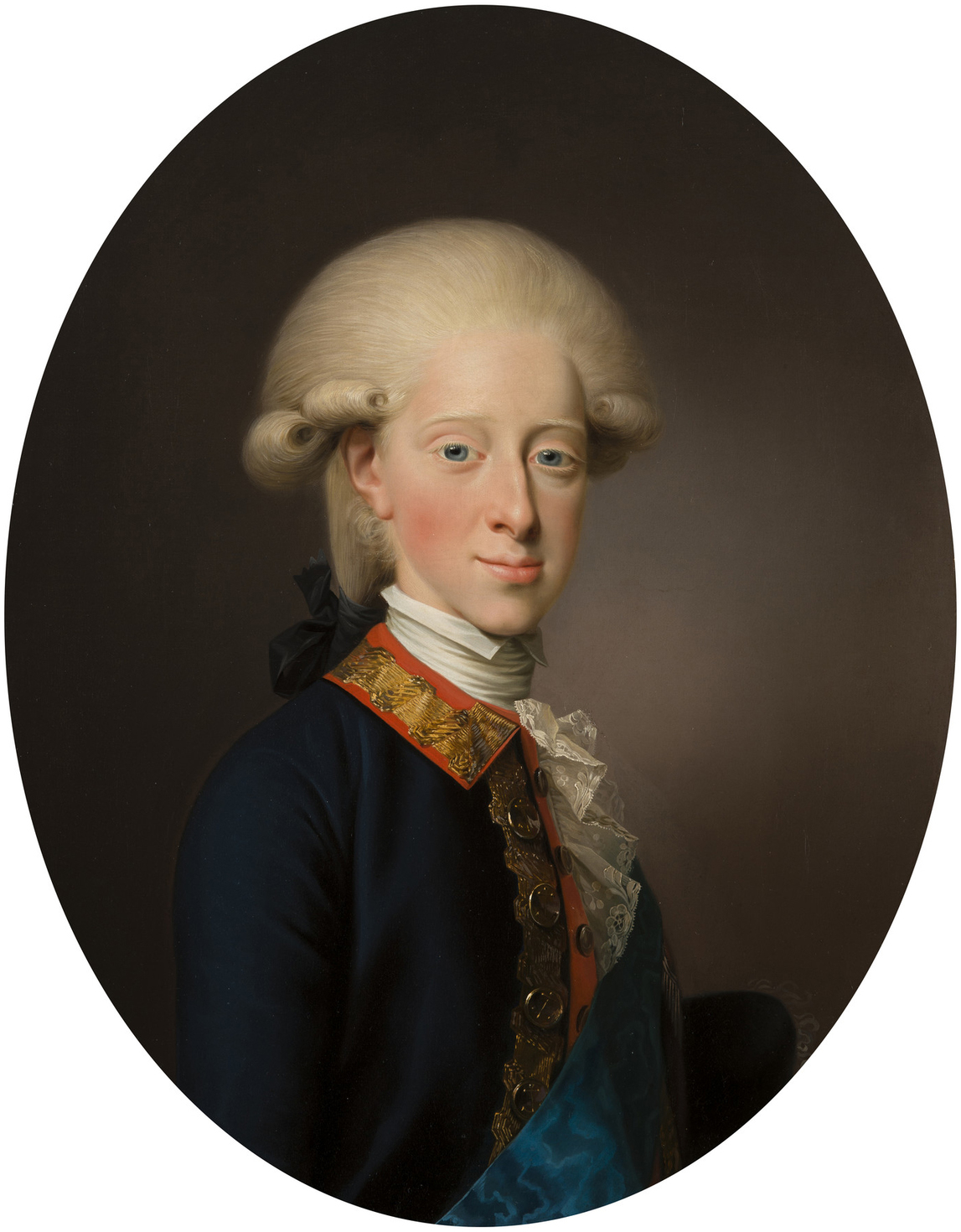
Portrait of Frederick as Crown Prince Regent, by Jens Juel, c. 1784

Already in 1782, Crown Prince Frederick came in contact with the minister Andreas Peter Bernstorff, who had been dismissed two years earlier. Later the Crown Prince entered into a conspiracy with other disaffected persons who were in opposition to the government. Despite the Crown Prince's age, the government deliberately postponed his confirmation that would confirm his adult status. But in 1784, as Crown Prince Frederick turned 16, it could no longer be postponed, and he was finally confirmed on 4 April, and was declared of legal majority. Already, on 14 April 1784, he proceeded to seize the full powers of the regency, dismissing the ministers loyal to the Queen Dowager. It is said that during the coup, he engaged in a fistfight with his half-uncle over the regency. He continued as regent of Denmark-Norway under his father's name until the latter's death in 1808.

=== Early reforms ===
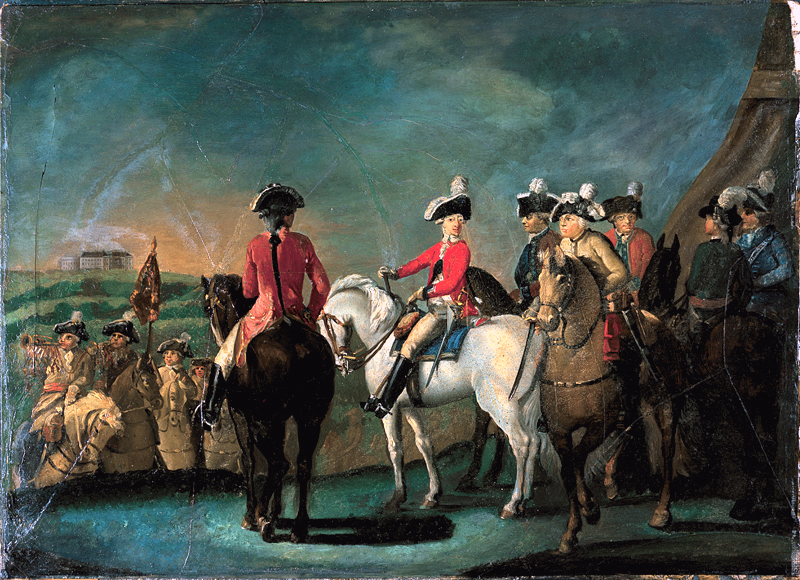
19-year-old Crown Prince Frederick, surrounded by his staff. In the background Frederiksberg Palace. Painted by Christian August Lorentzen.

During the first years of the regency, Frederick instituted widespread liberal reforms in the spirit of enlightened absolutism with the assistance of Chief Minister Andreas Peter Bernstorff, including the abolition of serfdom in Denmark in 1788 and hanging as a capital punishment was abolished in 1789 in both Denmark and Norway. In 1803, Dano-Norwegian involvement in the Transatlantic slave trade was abolished by government decree.

=== Marriage ===
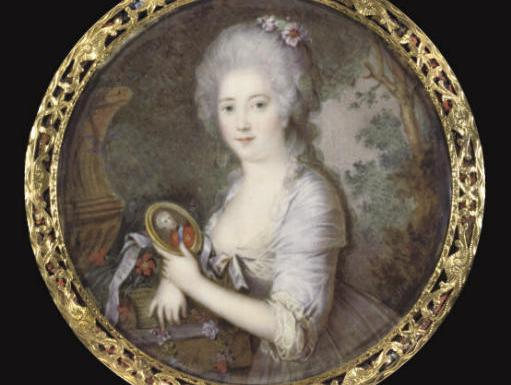
Marie Sophie supposedly holding a portrait of her fiancé. Miniature portrait by Cornelius Høyer.

After Crown Prince Frederick was declared of legal majority and assumed the regency in 1784, the Danish royal court started to make inquiries to arrange a marriage for him. There was speculation that he was to marry a Prussian princess, a choice supported by his step-grandmother Juliana Maria and her brother-in-law Frederick the Great. To demonstrate his independence, however, he personally selected his first-cousin Marie Sophie of Hesse-Kassel, a member of a German family with close marriage links with the royal families of both Denmark-Norway and Great Britain. They married in Gottorp on 31 July 1790 and had eight children. Their eldest daughter, Princess Caroline married her father's first cousin, Ferdinand, Hereditary Prince of Denmark. The youngest, Princess Wilhelmine, became the first wife of the future Frederick VII of Denmark.

== King of Denmark and loss of Norway ==
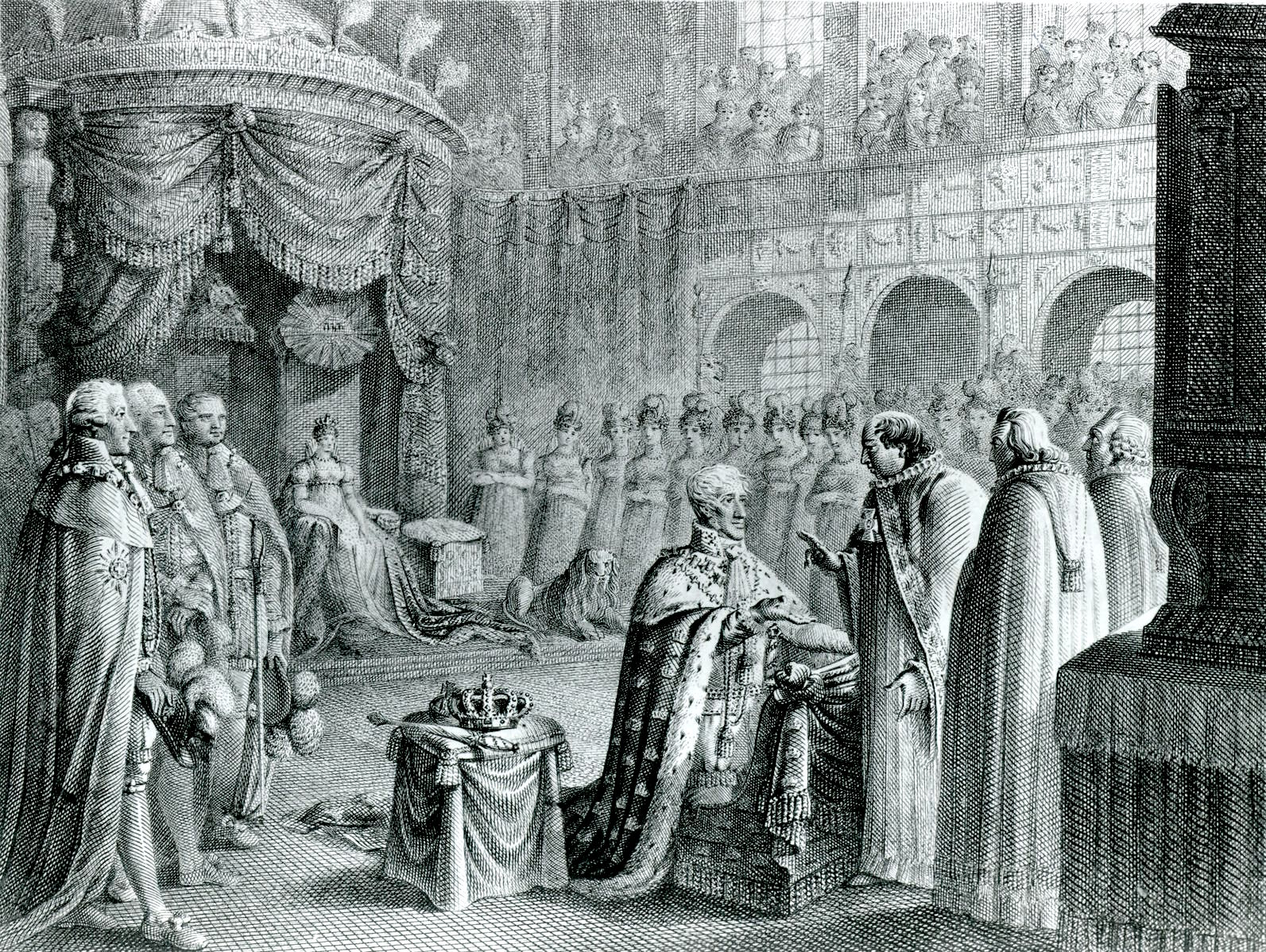
The anointment of King Frederick VI at Frederiksborg Palace on 31 July 1815. The ceremony was postponed due to the Napoleonic Wars.

On 13 March 1808, Christian VII died at the age of 59 at Rendsburg during a stay in the Duchy of Holstein. At the death of his father, Frederick finally ascended the thrones of Denmark and Norway in name also as their seventh absolute monarch at the age of 40. When the throne of Sweden seemed likely to become vacant in 1809, Frederick was interested in being elected there as well. Frederick actually was the first monarch of Denmark and Norway to descend from Gustav I of Sweden, who in the 1520s had led Sweden out of the Kalmar Union with the other Scandinavian countries. However, Frederick's brother-in-law, Prince Christian Augustus of Augustenborg, was first elected to the throne of Sweden, followed by the French Marshal Bernadotte.

In order to maintain neutrality, and avoid the Franco-British conflict, Denmark-Norway joined the Second League of Armed Neutrality and continued shipping. However, a disagreement occurred with the British over said neutral shipping as well as refusing to withdraw from the alliance. The English, led by Vice-Admiral Horatio Nelson, then attacked the Danish fleet in the Battle of Copenhagen of 1801.

Due to a treaty between Tsar Alexander I and Napoleon, a promise was made to extend the Continental System to include Denmark-Norway and Sweden. In response, England sent an ultimatum to Denmark; become England's ally, or hand over their fleet. Frederik VI was in Holstein at the time. He did return to the Capital, but then returned to Holstein the next day- without responding to the British. The British then bombarded Copenhagen for three days during the Battle of Copenhagen of 1807. This caused Frederik VI to declare war on England and enter an alliance with France.

The conflict continued in the Gunboat War between Denmark-Norway and the United Kingdom, which lasted until the Treaty of Kiel in 1814. After the French defeat in Russia in 1812, the Allies asked him to change sides, but he refused. Many historians portray the King as stubborn, incompetent, and motivated by a misconceived loyalty towards Napoleon. However, this narrative has changed over the recent years and some historians have provided a new perspective on the King; Frederick VI stayed with Napoleon in order to protect the exposed situation with his kingdom's territory in nowadays Norway, which was dependent on grain imports and had become a target of Swedish territorial ambitions. He expected the wars would end with a great international conference in which Napoleon would have a major voice, and would help protect the crown's interests, especially towards the Norwegian kingdom.

After the French defeat in the Napoleonic Wars in 1814 and the loss of the Norwegian crown (as a result of the Treaty of Kiel), Frederick VI carried through an authoritarian and reactionary course, giving up the liberal ideas of his years as a prince regent. Censorship and suppression of all opposition together with the poor state of the country's economy made this period of his reign somewhat gloomy, though the King himself in general maintained his position of a well-meaning autocrat. From the 1830s the economic depression was eased a bit and from 1834 the King accepted a small democratic innovation by the creation of the Assemblies of the Estate (purely consultative regional assemblies); this had the unintended result of later exacerbating relations between Danes and Germans in Schleswig, whose regional assembly became a forum for constant bickering between the two national groups.

== Later life and succession ==
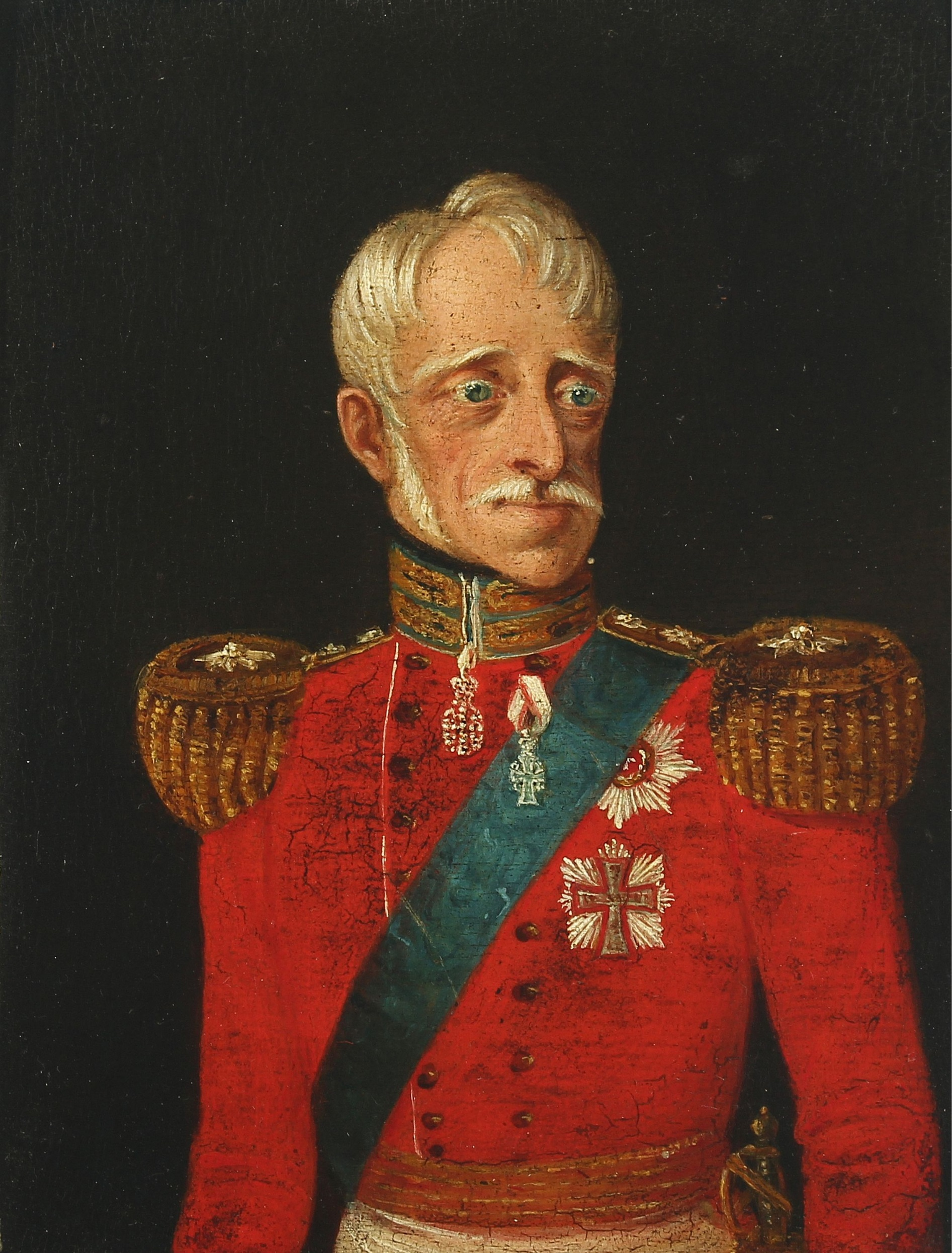
Portrait of Frederick VI in his old age, c. 1830s

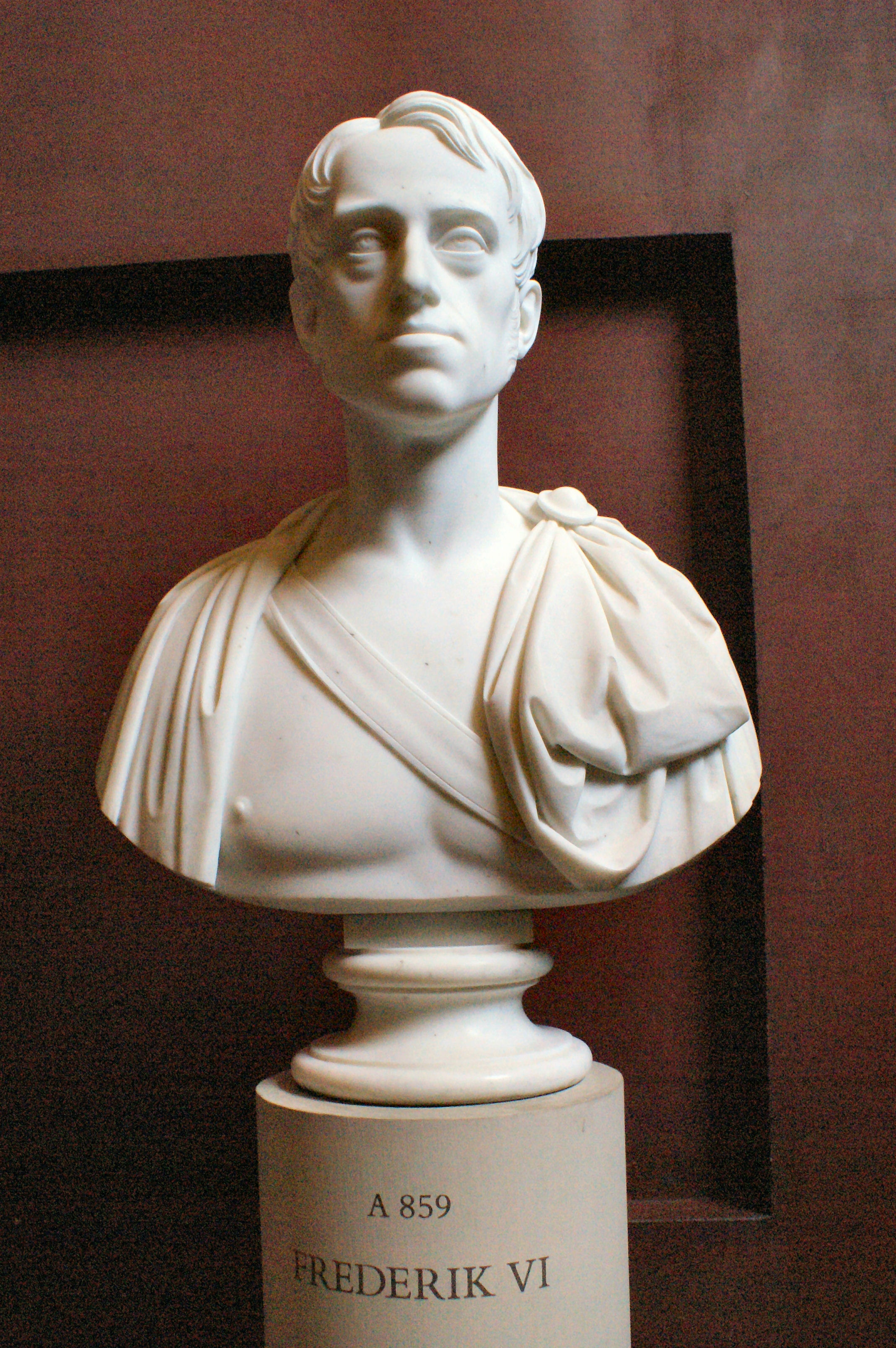
A bust of Frederick VI, modelled by Bertel Thorvaldsen.

Frederick VI was known as a patron of astronomy and in 1832 offered gold medal prizes to anyone who discovered a comet using a telescope. His successors continued this until 1850. The prize was terminated in the aftermath of the Three Years' War. On 23 February 1827, he granted a royal charter giving Serampore College in Danish India the status of a university to confer degrees. It became the third Danish University after those in Copenhagen and Kiel. After the discovery of the Haraldskær Woman in a peat bog in Jutland in the year 1835, Frederick VI ordered a royal interment in an elaborately carved sarcophagus for the Iron Age mummy, decreeing it to be the body of Queen Gunnhild. Later this identification proved incorrect, but the action suited his political agenda at the time.

Frederick VI died at the age of 71 at Amalienborg Palace and was buried in Frederick V's chapel in Roskilde Cathedral. Frederick reigned over Denmark for a total of 55 years; 24 years as crown prince regent and 31 years as king. He was the 894th Knight of the Order of the Golden Fleece in Spain and the 654th Knight of the Order of the Garter in 1822. The Royal Frederick University (now University of Oslo) in Oslo was named in his honour.

As Frederick VI had no surviving sons to succeed him, so he was succeeded on the throne of Denmark by his paternal half-first cousin Christian.

== Descendants ==
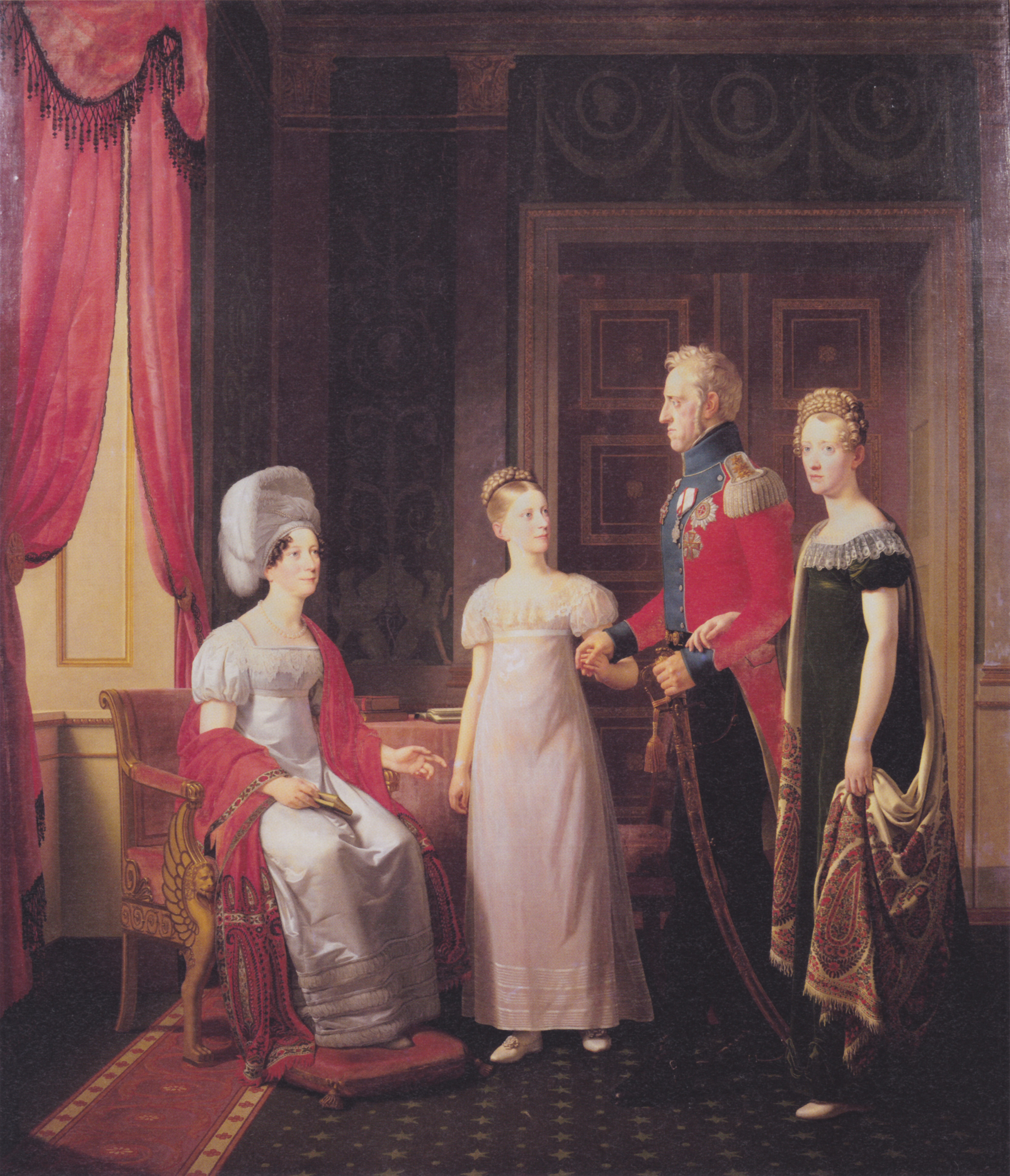
King Frederick VI and Queen Marie with Princesses Caroline and Vilhelmine. Portrait by Christoffer Wilhelm Eckersberg, 1821.

Frederick VI and his wife Marie of Hesse-Kassel were the parents of eight children, six of whom died in infancy. Two daughters grew to adulthood and neither of them had children. The eight children of Frederick and Marie were:

- Christian (Copenhagen, 22 September 1791 – Copenhagen, 23 September 1791) died in infancy
- Marie Louise (Copenhagen, 19 November 1792 – Frederiksborg, 12 October 1793) died in infancy
- Caroline (Copenhagen, 28 October 1793 – Copenhagen, 31 March 1881), married to her father's first cousin Frederick Ferdinand of Denmark, (d. 1863). Without issue.
- Louise (Copenhagen, 21 August 1795 – Copenhagen, 7 December 1795) died in infancy
- Christian (Copenhagen, 1 September 1797 – Copenhagen, 5 September 1797) died in infancy
- Juliana Louise (Copenhagen, 12 February 1802 – Copenhagen, 23 February 1802) died in infancy
- Frederikke Marie (3 June 1805 – 14 July 1805) died in infancy
- Vilhelmine Marie (Kiel, 18 January 1808 – Glücksburg, 30 May 1891), married twice; firstly her second cousin Frederick (the future Frederick VII of Denmark), but they divorced, and she married secondly Karl, Duke of Schleswig-Holstein-Sonderburg-Glücksburg, who was eldest brother of the future Christian IX of Denmark. Both her marriages were without issue.

By his mistress Frederikke Dannemand (Bente Mortensdatter Andersen (Rafsted)), King Frederick VI had these four children:

- Louise Frederikke Dannemand, Countess of Dannemand (16 April 1810 – 28 December 1888), married in 1836 Wilhelm von Zachariæ (6 June 1807 – 16 August 1871), and had issue
- Caroline Augusta Dannemand, Countess of Dannemand (1812–1844), married in 1837 Adolf Frederik Schack von Brockdorff (Vejle, 7 February 1810 – 18 October 1859), and had issue
- Frederik Wilhelm Dannemand, Count of Dannemand (20 July 1813 – 12 March 1888), married firstly in 1840 Franziska von Scholten (1820–44), without issue, married secondly in 1845 Lovisa, Countess Schulin (1815–1884), without issue, and married thirdly in 1884 Wilhelmina Laursen (1840–1886), without issue.
- Frederik Waldemar Dannemand, Count of Dannemand (6 June 1819 – 4 March 1835)

== Honours ==
He received the following orders and decorations:

- Denmark:
  - Knight of the Elephant, 28 January 1768
  - Royal Family Order of Christian VII, 21 October 1774
  - Grand Commander of the Dannebrog, in Diamonds, 1808
  - Founder of the Cross of Honour of the Order of the Dannebrog, 26 June 1808
- Austrian Empire: Grand Cross of St. Stephen, 1814
- Kingdom of Bavaria: Knight of St. Hubert, 1814
- France:
  - French Empire: Grand Eagle of the Legion of Honour, 1810
  - Kingdom of France: Knight of the Holy Spirit, 1818
- Kingdom of Prussia: Knight of the Black Eagle, 15 September 1814
- Russian Empire:
  - Knight of St. Andrew, 2 September 1808
  - Knight of St. Alexander Nevsky, 2 September 1808
- Spain: Knight of the Golden Fleece, 14 July 1818
- Sweden: Knight of the Seraphim, 3 July 1786
- Two Sicilies: Grand Cross of St. Ferdinand and Merit
- Kingdom of Portugal: Grand Cross of the Sash of the Three Orders, 21 May 1824
- United Kingdom: Knight of the Garter, 13 February 1822
- Württemberg: Knight of the Golden Eagle

== Ancestry ==
Ancestors of Frederick VI of Denmark

8. Christian VI of Denmark
4. Frederick V of Denmark
9. Sophie Magdalene of Kulmbach
2. Christian VII of Denmark
10. George II of Great Britain
5. Louise of Great Britain
11. Caroline of Ansbach
1. Frederick VI of Denmark
12. George II of Great Britain (= 10)
6. Frederick, Prince of Wales
13. Caroline of Ansbach (= 11)
3. Caroline Matilda of Great Britain
14. Frederick II, Duke of Saxe-Gotha-Altenburg
7. Augusta of Saxe-Gotha
15. Magdalena Augusta of Anhalt-Zerbst

Frederick VI House of Oldenburg Born: 28 January 1768 Died: 3 December 1839
Regnal titles
Preceded by Christian VII	King of Norway; 1808–1814	Succeeded by Christian VIII/Christian Frederick
Preceded by Christian VII	King of Denmark; Duke of Holstein and Schleswig; 1808–1839	Succeeded by Christian VIII/Christian Frederick
Vacant Napoleonic Wars	Duke of Saxe-Lauenburg; 1814–1839	Succeeded by Christian VIII/Christian Frederick
