= Frederick, Hereditary Prince of Denmark =

Regent of Denmark–Norway from 1772 to 1784

Frederick
- Hereditary Prince of Denmark and Norway
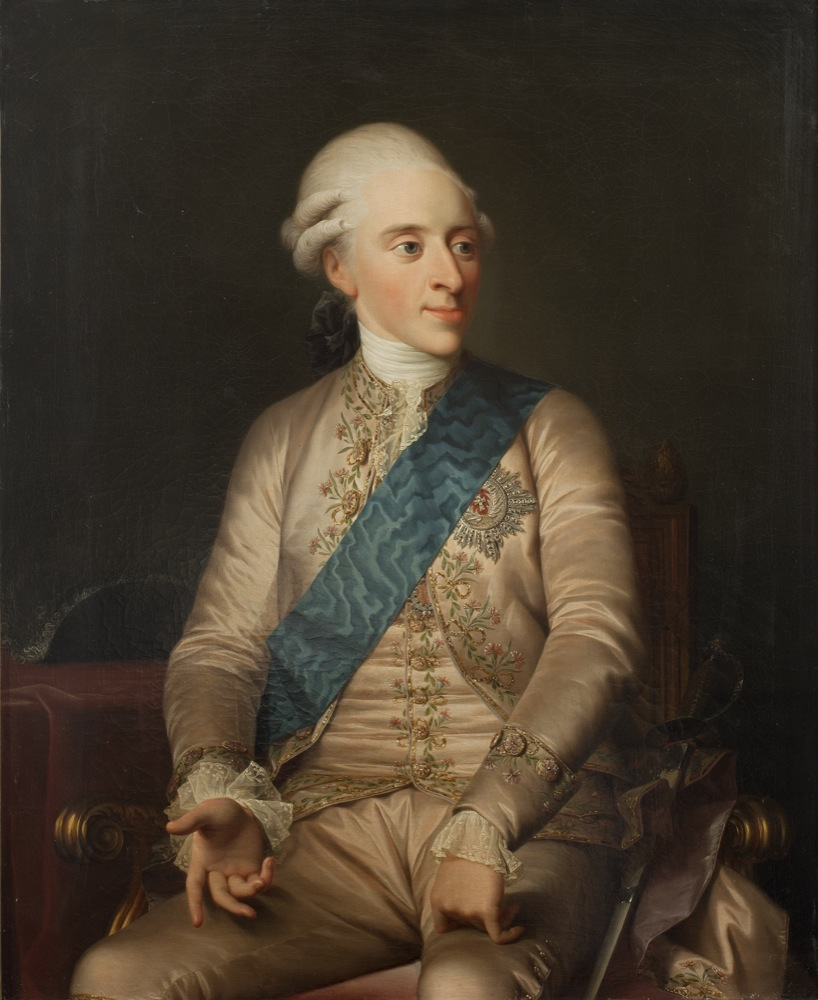
- Portrait by Jens Juel.

Regent of Denmark–Norway
- Regency: 1772–1784
- Successor: Crown Prince Frederick
- Monarch: Christian VII
- Born: 11 October 1753; Christiansborg Palace, Copenhagen, Denmark
- Died: 7 December 1805 (aged 52); Amalienborg Palace, Copenhagen, Denmark
- Burial: Roskilde Cathedral
- Spouse: Duchess Sophia Frederica of Mecklenburg-Schwerin (m. 1774; died 1794)
- Issue: Christian VIII of Denmark; Juliane Sophie, Landgravine of Hesse-Philippsthal-Barchfeld; Louise Charlotte, Princess of Hesse-Kassel; Ferdinand, Hereditary Prince of Denmark
- House: Oldenburg
- Father: Frederick V of Denmark
- Mother: Juliana Maria of Brunswick-Wolfenbüttel
- Religion: Lutheranism

Frederick, Hereditary Prince of Denmark (Danish: Frederik; 11 October 1753 – 7 December 1805) was heir presumptive to the thrones of Denmark and Norway. He was the only surviving son of King Frederick V and his second wife, Juliana Maria of Braunschweig-Wolfenbüttel. Even though he was the Regent by title for his brother Christian VII, his mother Juliana was the real de facto ruler of the Danish realm, who controlled, managed and held the real powers over the realm while he only held the official title.

After the fall of Johann Friedrich Struensee in 1772, Hereditary Prince Frederick was installed as regent, acting on behalf of his half-brother, King Christian VII, who was mentally unstable. After the coup of 1784, when the king's son Crown Prince Frederick took power and regency, he was left without influence at the court.

== Life ==
=== Early life ===
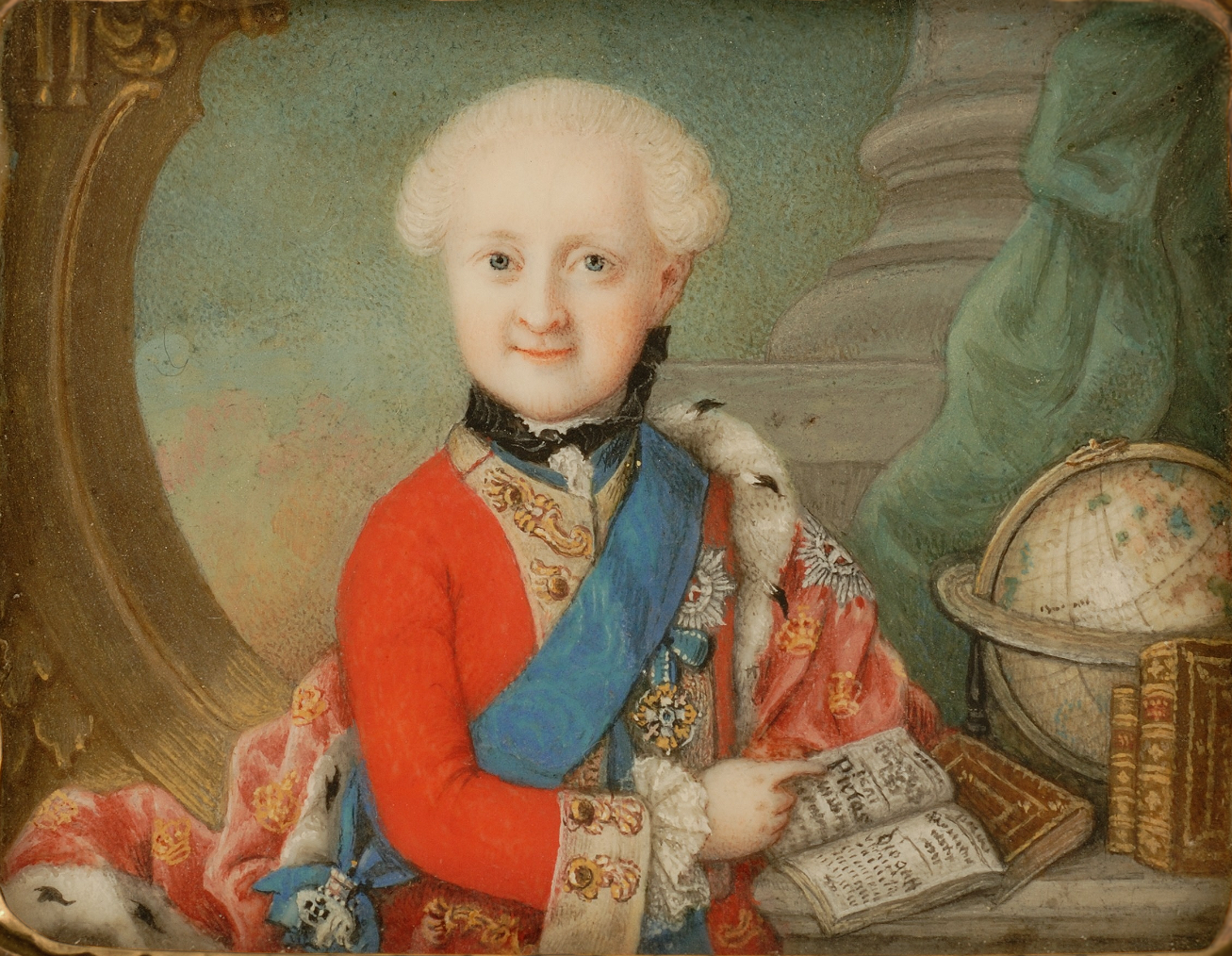
Miniature portrait of Prince Frederick as a child by Christopher Foltmar, c. 1760.

Frederick was born at Christiansborg Palace in Copenhagen on 11 October 1753. To provide for his future position, at the age of 3 he was elected coadjutor in the Prince-Bishopric of Lübeck. This meant that in time he would succeed the Prince-Bishop then in office, Frederick August. This plan had to be abandoned, however, and Frederick stayed in Denmark as a junior member of the royal family.

=== Marriage ===
He married Duchess Sophia Frederica of Mecklenburg-Schwerin (1758–1794) in Copenhagen on 21 October 1774. She was a daughter of Duke Louis of Mecklenburg-Schwerin and Princess Charlotte Sophie of Saxe-Coburg-Saalfeld.

=== Regent of the kingdoms ===
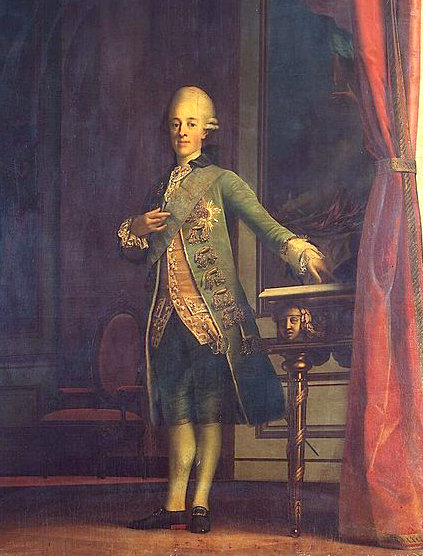
Hereditary Prince Frederick, Regent of the Kingdoms by Vigilius Eriksen.

His elder half-brother, King Christian VII, who had a severe mental illness (believed to have been schizophrenia), and had been divorced from his wife, Caroline Matilda of Great Britain (who was then exiled), Prince Frederick was designated as regent of Denmark–Norway in 1772, when 18 years old. His regency was mostly nominal, the power being held by his mother, Queen Juliane Marie, and minister Ove Høegh-Guldberg.

He acted as regent until the coup of 1784, when his 16-year-old half-nephew Frederick (the future King Frederick VI), took power and regency.

=== Later life ===
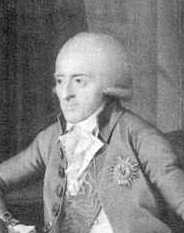
Hereditary Prince Frederick in 1790.

After the coup, Frederick was left without much influence at the court. After Christiansborg Palace was destroyed by fire in 1794, Hereditary Prince Frederick moved with his family to Amalienborg Palace. Sophia Frederica died the same year, shortly after the move. Hereditary Prince Frederick outlived his wife by 11 years and died at Amalienborg Palace on 7 December 1805. Eventually, his son Christian Frederick would succeed Frederick VI as king, first in Norway then in Denmark, and his granddaughter Louise of Hesse-Kassel married the future Christian IX, making Frederick an ancestor of the current Frederik X of Denmark.

== In Literature ==
Prince Frederick is an important character in Norah Lofts' historical novel The Lost Queen (1969), chronicling the tragic marriage of King Christian VII and Queen Caroline Matilda. The book suggests that Frederick was himself in love with the Queen and jealous of her lover Johann Friedrich Struensee – which is not firmly attested in historical sources.

== Issue ==
- Stillborn daughter (19 September 1781).
- Stillborn daughter (17 February 1783).
- Princess Juliana Marie (2 May 1784 – 28 October 1784), died in infancy.
- Prince Christian Frederick (18 September 1786 – 20 January 1848), future King Christian Frederick of Norway and Christian VIII of Denmark.
- Princess Juliane Sophie (18 February 1788 – 9 May 1850), married in 1812 to Prince William of Hesse-Philippsthal-Barchfeld; they had no issue.
- Princess Louise Charlotte (30 October 1789 – 28 March 1864), married in 1810 to Prince William of Hesse-Kassel; they had issue.
- Hereditary Prince Ferdinand (22 November 1792 – 29 June 1863), married in 1829 to Princess Caroline of Denmark; they had no issue.

== Ancestry ==
Ancestors of Frederick, Hereditary Prince of Denmark

8. Frederick IV of Denmark
4. Christian VI of Denmark
9. Duchess Louise of Mecklenburg-Güstrow
2. Frederick V of Denmark
10. Christian Henry, Margrave of Brandenburg-Kulmbach
5. Princess Sophie Magdalene of Brandenburg-Kulmbach
11. Countess Sophie Christiane of Wolfstein
1. Frederick, Hereditary Prince of Denmark
12. Ferdinand Albert I, Duke of Brunswick-Wolfenbüttel-Bevern
6. Ferdinand Albert II, Duke of Brunswick-Wolfenbüttel
13. Princess Christine of Hesse-Eschwege
3. Duchess Juliana Maria of Brunswick-Wolfenbüttel
14. Louis Rudolph, Duke of Brunswick-Lüneburg
7. Princess Antoinette of Brunswick-Wolfenbüttel
15. Princess Christine Louise of Oettingen-Oettingen
