= Ferdinand, Hereditary Prince of Denmark =

Heir apparent of Denmark from 1848 to 1863

Ferdinand
- Hereditary Prince of Denmark
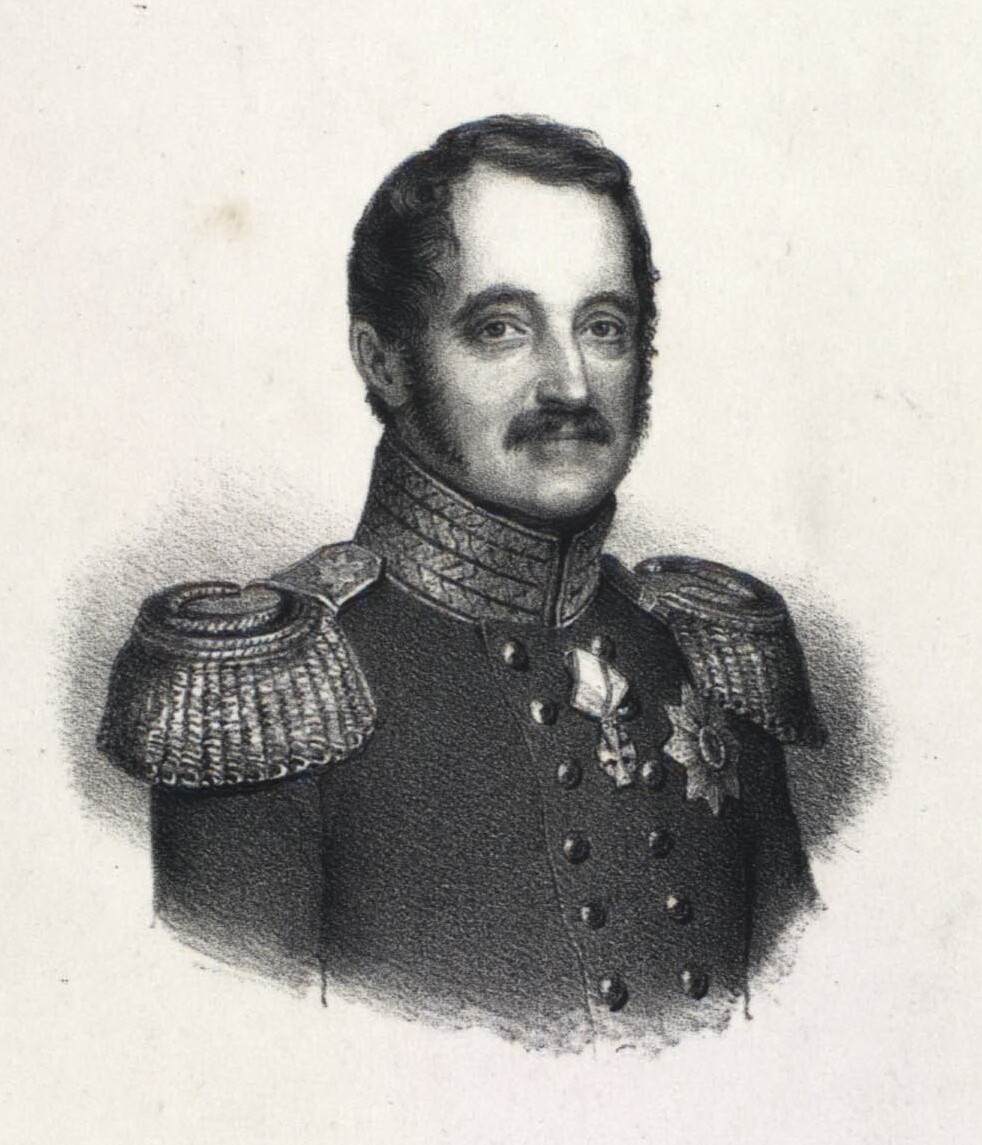
- Born: 22 November 1792; Christiansborg Palace, Copenhagen, Denmark
- Died: 29 June 1863 (aged 70); Copenhagen, Denmark
- Burial: Roskilde Cathedral
- Spouse: Princess Caroline of Denmark (m. 1829)
- House: Oldenburg
- Father: Frederick, Hereditary Prince of Denmark (officially); Frederick von Blücher (rumored)
- Mother: Sophia Frederica of Mecklenburg-Schwerin

Frederick Ferdinand, Hereditary Prince of Denmark (Danish: Arveprins Ferdinand) (22 November 1792 – 29 June 1863) was grandson of King Frederick V and heir presumptive to the throne from 1848 until his death. Had he lived five months longer, he would have outlived his nephew, King Frederick VII, and become King of Denmark.

== Early life ==
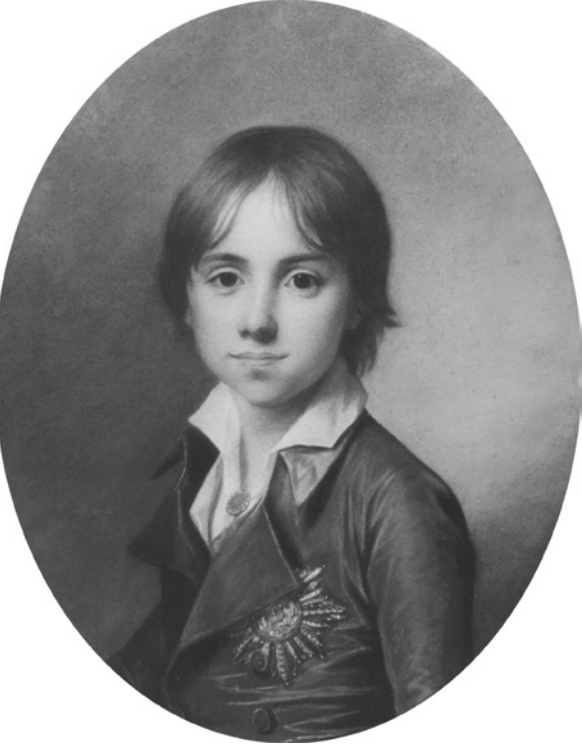
Portrait of Prince Ferdinand as a child, c. 1802

Prince Ferdinand was born at Christiansborg Palace in Copenhagen on 22 November 1792 as the youngest child of Frederick, Hereditary Prince of Denmark and Norway and Sophie Frederikke of Mecklenburg, thus being a grandson of late King Frederick V of Denmark and Norway.

His uncle King Christian VII being mentally unstable, his father had acted as regent after the fall of Johann Friedrich Struensee in 1772. But after the coup of 1784, when the king's son Crown Prince Frederick took power and regency, Hereditary Prince Frederick had been without influence at the court. However, Crown Prince Frederick being without male heirs, Hereditary Prince Frederick and his sons were in the immediate line of succession to the throne.

When Christiansborg Palace was destroyed by fire in 1794, the young Prince and his family moved to Amalienborg Palace where he was brought up, spending the summers at Sorgenfri Palace.

== Marriage ==
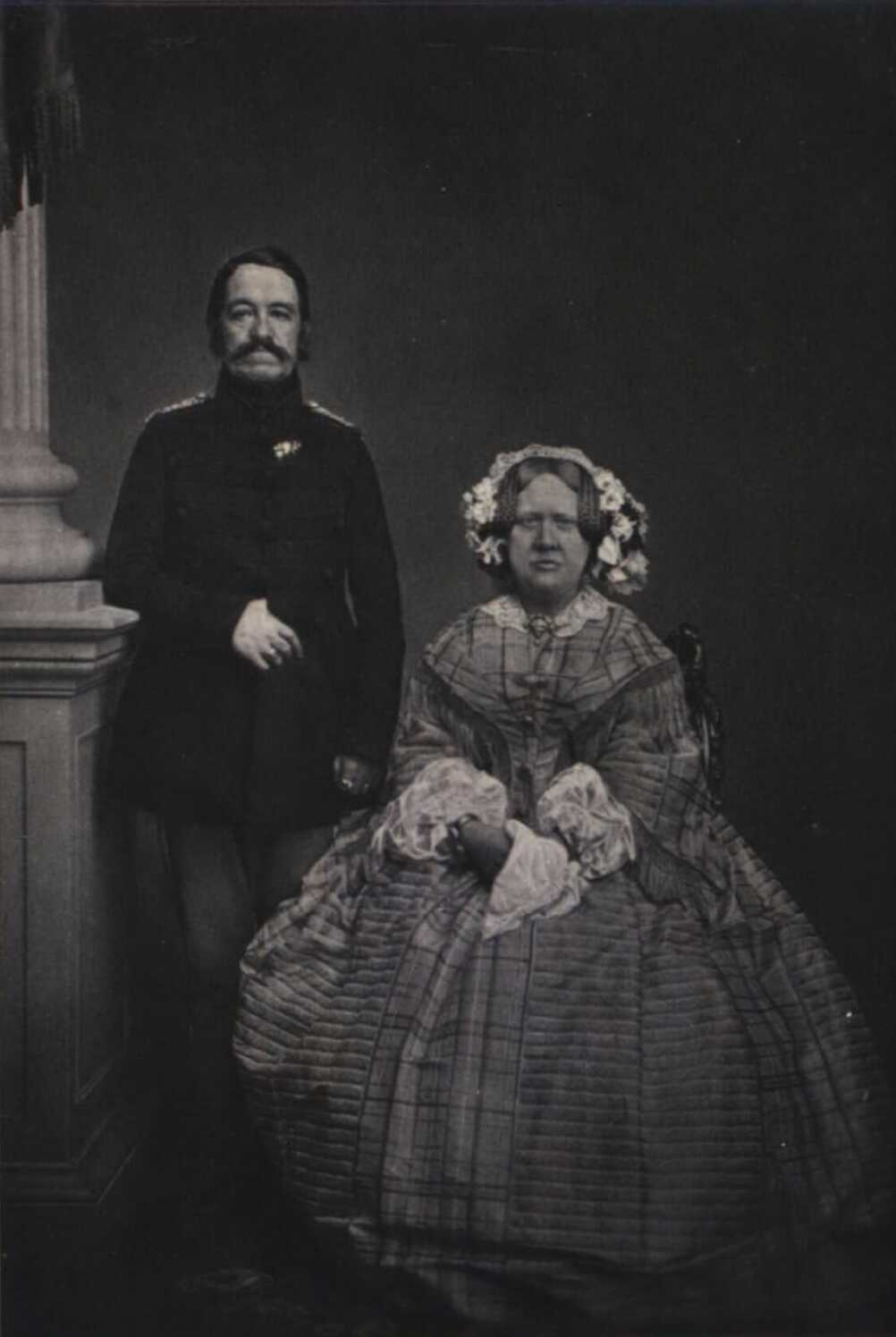
Prince Ferdinand as hereditary Prince and his wife Princess Caroline, c. 1863

Prince Ferdinand married at Frederiksberg Palace on 1 August 1829 his first cousin once removed, Princess Caroline of Denmark (1793–1881). She was the eldest daughter of the above-mentioned sonless Crown Prince Frederick, now King Frederick VI of Denmark. When Frederick VI died in 1839, because of the Salic Law Caroline did not succeed to the throne, which was inherited by the closest male relative, Ferdinand's elder brother Prince Christian Frederick.

== Later life ==
The number of male members of the Royal House was so low in those decades that Ferdinand himself was always very close to the succession. At the death of his brother Christian VIII in 1848, the aged Ferdinand became heir presumptive.

Ferdinand died childless, which was one of the reasons why the main branch of the Danish Royal House soon became extinct, triggering the second war of Schleswig.

== Ancestry ==
Ancestors of Ferdinand, Hereditary Prince of Denmark

8. Christian VI of Denmark
4. Frederick V of Denmark
9. Princess Sophie Magdalene of Brandenburg-Kulmbach
2. Frederick, Hereditary Prince of Denmark
10. Ferdinand Albert II, Duke of Brunswick-Wolfenbüttel
5. Duchess Juliana Maria of Brunswick-Wolfenbüttel
11. Duchess Antoinette of Brunswick-Wolfenbüttel
1. Ferdinand, Hereditary Prince of Denmark
12. Christian Ludwig II, Duke of Mecklenburg-Schwerin
6. Duke Louis of Mecklenburg-Schwerin
13. Duchess Gustave Caroline of Mecklenburg-Strelitz
3. Duchess Sophia Frederica of Mecklenburg-Schwerin
14. Francis Josias, Duke of Saxe-Coburg-Saalfeld
7. Princess Charlotte Sophie of Saxe-Coburg-Saalfeld
15. Princess Anna Sophie of Schwarzburg-Rudolstadt
