= Order of Christian VII =

Danish order of knighthood

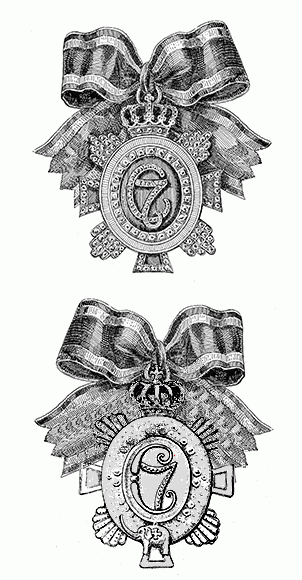
- Badge and sash of the order (obverse and reverse).

Awarded by Christian VII of Denmark
- Type: Chivalric order in one class
- Established: 21 October 1774
- Motto: Tessera Concordiæ
- Status: Disestablished
- Grades: Member
- Order of Christian VII ribbon

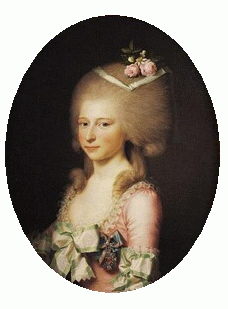
Princess Louise Augusta of Denmark with the Order of Christian VII, painted by Jens Juel

The Order of Christian VII, also called "Tessera Concordiæ", was a Danish order of knighthood that flourished for some time during the 18th century. The Danes call it "Christian VIIs Orden" or "Ordenen Tessera Concordiæ".

After the banishment of the adulterous Queen Caroline Mathilde on 17 January 1772 the Royal Danish Court needed a new decoration to replace the Order of Mathilde. King Christian VII of Denmark founded this order on 21 October 1774 as a new decoration that was solely meant for the Danish royal family. It was awarded to gentlemen and ladies. The men wore the insignia detached from a ribbon on the left side of the breast. The ladies wore the same insignia on a bow of the same ribbon on their left shoulder.

Painter Jens Juel made a portrait of Danish princess Louise Augusta in 1784, in which she wore the order of her presumed father Christian VII on a blue ribbon with three silver stripes, almost identical to the earlier Danish Ordre de l'Union Parfaite.

After the death of Queen-Dowager Juliana Maria in 1796 the order fell into disuse.

== Literature ==
- H.F. Grandjean, "De Kongelige Danske Ridderordener" (1903)
- Lars Stevnsborg, "Kongeriget Danmarks Ordener, Medaljer og Hæderstegn" (2005)
