= Princess Caroline of Denmark =

Caroline of Denmark
- Hereditary Princess of Denmark
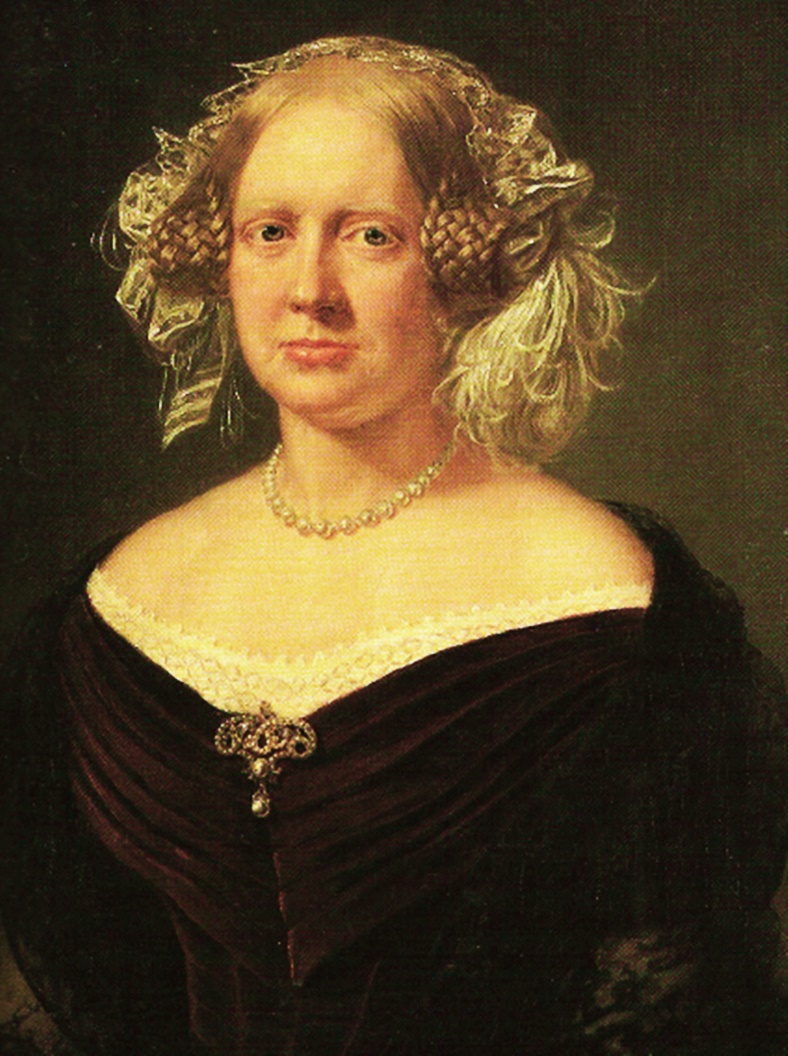
- Painting by August Schiøtt, 1854
- Born: 28 October 1793; Christiansborg Palace, Copenhagen
- Died: 31 March 1881 (aged 87); Bernstorff Mansion, Copenhagen
- Burial: Roskilde Cathedral
- Spouse: Ferdinand, Hereditary Prince of Denmark (m. 1829; died 1863)
- House: Oldenburg
- Father: Frederick VI of Denmark
- Mother: Marie of Hesse-Kassel

Princess Caroline of Denmark (28 October 1793 – 31 March 1881) was the eldest surviving daughter of King Frederick VI of Denmark. She was unofficially known as "Kronprinsesse Caroline" (English: Crown Princess Caroline) prior to her marriage, and later as "Arveprinsesse Caroline" (English: Hereditary Princess Caroline). In 1829, after several failed marriage attempts, she was married to her father's first cousin, Hereditary Prince Ferdinand, who was heir presumptive to the throne from 1848 to 1863.

== Birth and family ==
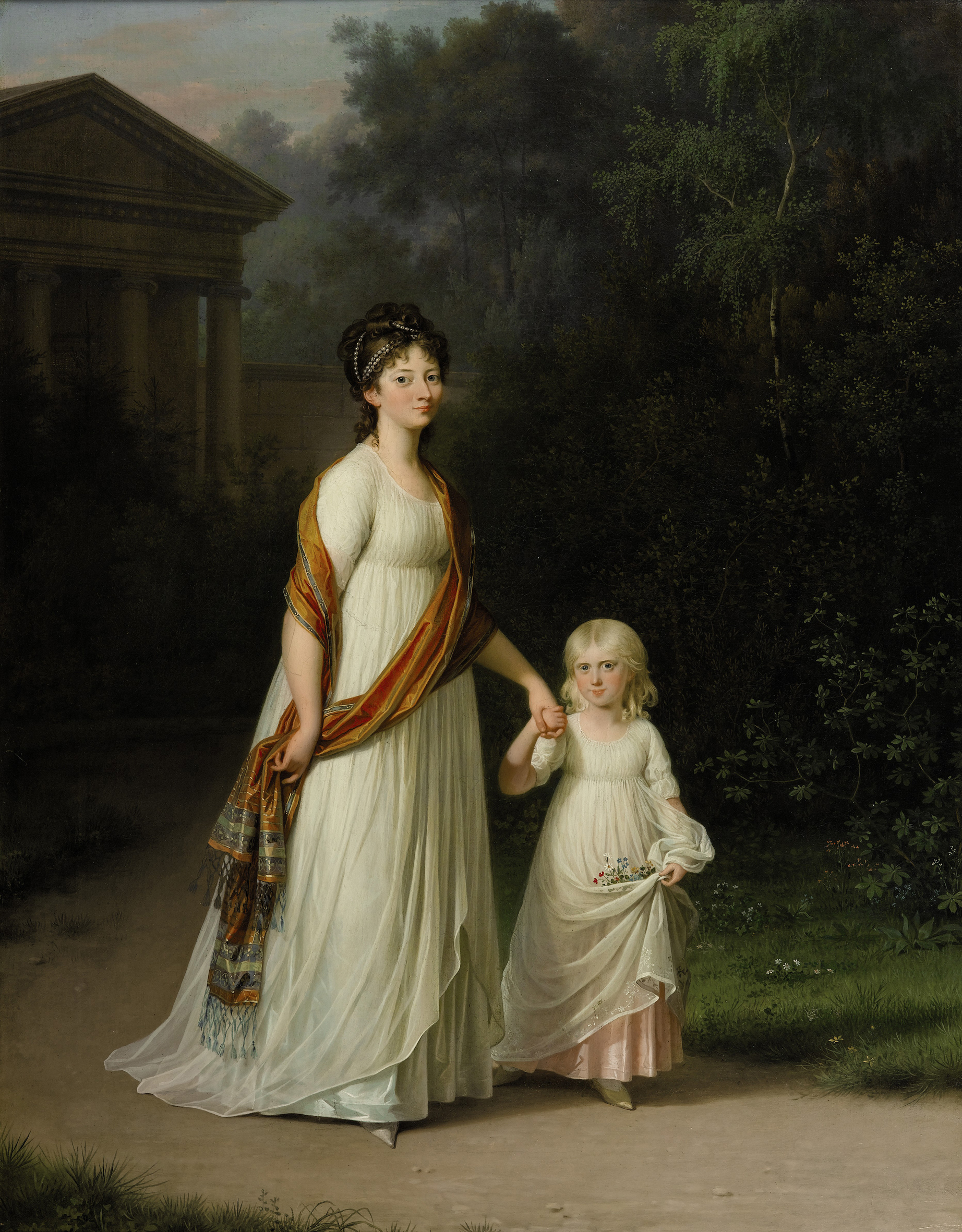
Princess Caroline with her mother, Crown Princess Marie. Painting by Jens Juel, c. 1800.

Princess Caroline was born on 28 October 1793 at Christiansborg Palace, the then principal residence of the Danish Monarchy in central Copenhagen. She was the third child of Crown Prince Frederick (the future King Frederick VI of Denmark) and his spouse and first cousin, Princess Marie of Hesse-Kassel. Her birth was much welcomed by the public, as her two elder siblings had died soon after their birth. Thus, on his own initiative, a citizen had a silver medal struck to commemorate the birth, one side of which showed a cradle with the inscription:

Denne er Dydens Løn, flere er Folkets Bøn! (This is the reward of virtue, more are the people's prayer!)

However, despite these well-intentioned wishes, she and her fourteen years younger sister, Princess Vilhelmine, would be the only of the parent's eight children to reach adulthood.

Princess Caroline was born during the reign of her paternal grandfather, King Christian VII, but due to the king's mental illness, he was not able to rule himself. In 1784, her father had seized power in a palace revolution and had since acted as prince regent of Denmark-Norway.

== Upbringing and education ==
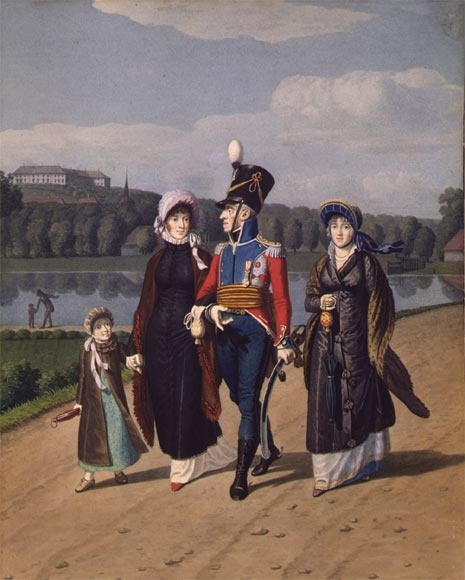
Queen Marie and King Frederick VI strolling with their daughters in Frederiksberg Gardens in the 1810s. Frederiksberg Palace can be seen in the background. Watercolor by Johannes Senn, c. 1813.

Four months after her birth, on 26 February 1794, Christiansborg Palace was destroyed by fire. Subsequently, Princess Caroline moved with her parents to the Amalienborg Palace complex in the district of Frederiksstaden in central Copenhagen. There she grew up with her sister at Schack's Palace (Note: Today, Schack's Palace is also known at Christian IX's Palace.), spending the summers at Frederiksberg Palace, just outside Copenhagen. She had a very close relationship with her father. She was given a broad, but not very thorough or deep, education by private tutors. Under the supervision of her governess, a Miss Jensen from the town of Schleswig, she was taught Danish by professor Frederik Høegh-Guldberg, drawing by the flower painter Johannes Ludvig Camradt and music by the composers Christoph Ernst Friedrich Weyse and Friedrich Kuhlau.

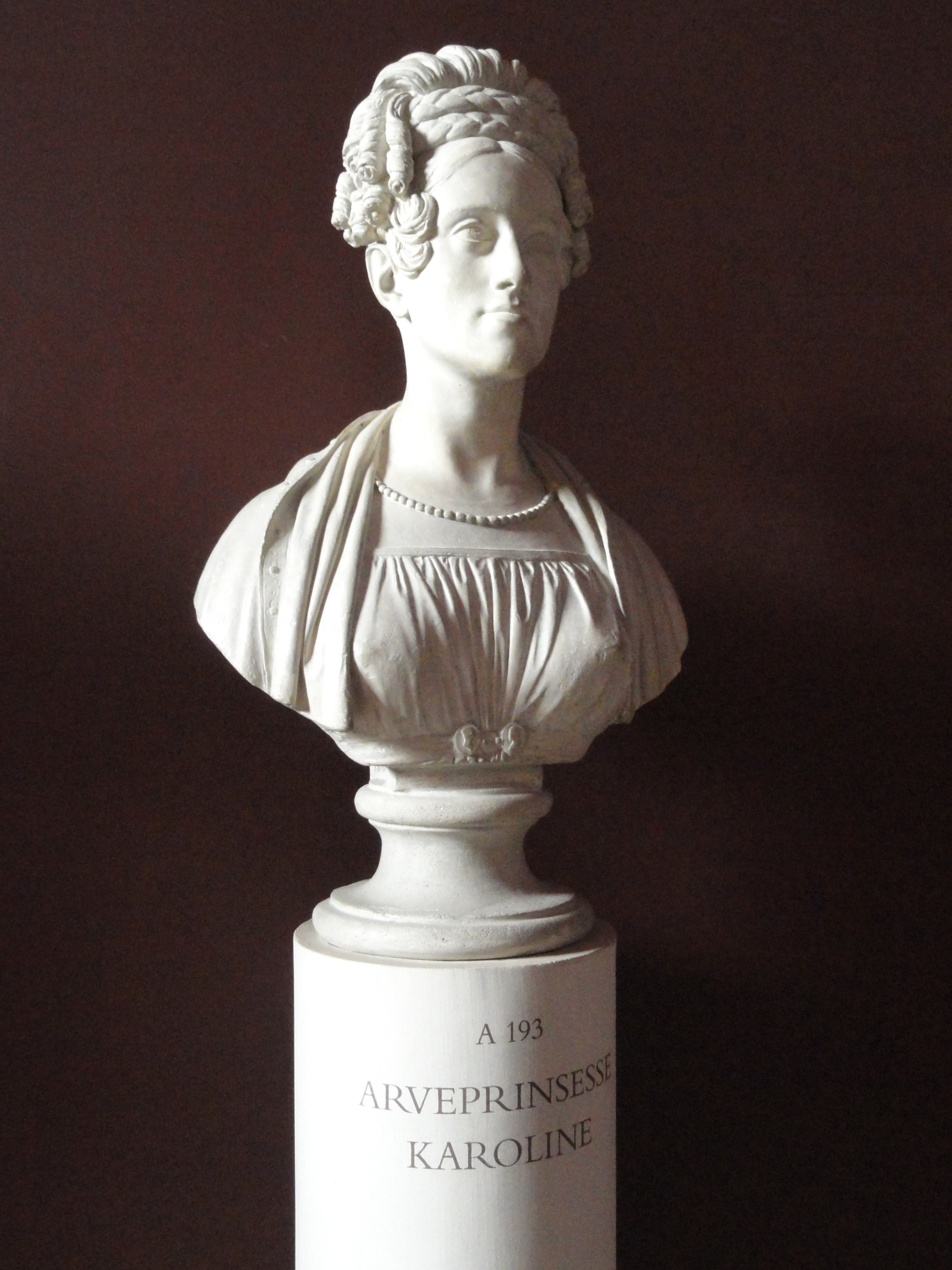
Bust of Princess Caroline, sculpted by Bertel Thorvaldsen, c. 1819.

At the death of her grandfather Christian VII of Denmark in 1808, her father ascended as king. Her father had no surviving sons and Caroline and her sister Vilhelmine Marie (1808-1891), were excluded from succession to the throne as a result of Salic Law. Despite this fact, however, she was still commonly called and referred to as Crown Princess prior to her marriage, as the eldest child of her father, though she did not have the formal title. She met Hans Christian Andersen in 1822 and was very interested in his writing and adventure.

== Marriage ==
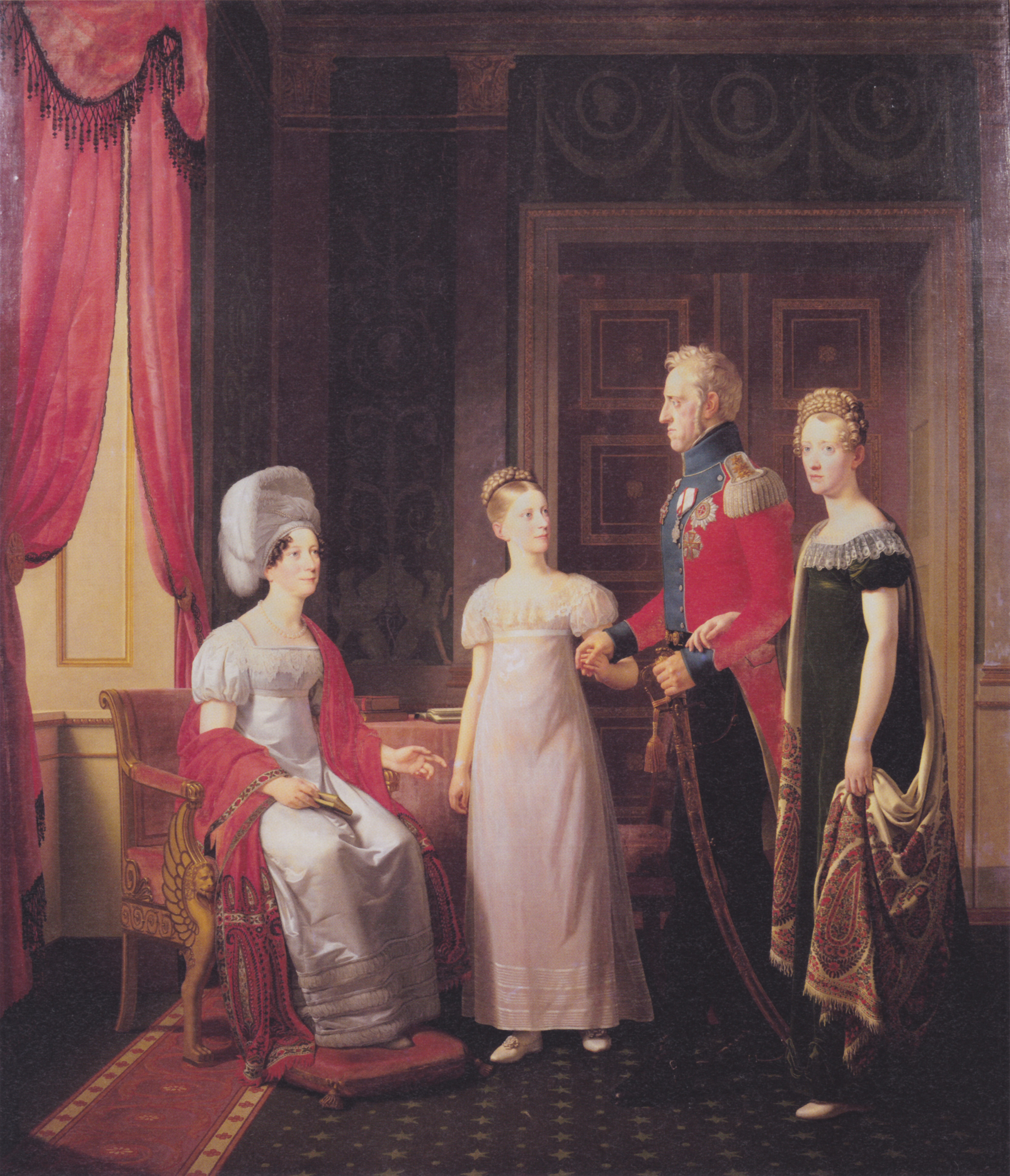
King Frederick VI and Queen Marie with their daughters Princess Caroline and Princess Vilhelmine Marie. Portrait by Christoffer Wilhelm Eckersberg, 1821.

Princess Caroline was not described as particularly talented or beautiful, but since her father had no surviving legitimate sons, she was still a very desirable bride. During her youth, several possible marriages were planned for her but without result. Already in 1810, two years after her father's accession to the throne, Napoleon suggested a marriage between the 17-year-old princess and the newly elected heir to the Swedish throne, the 41-year-old Prince Christian August of Augustenborg; her father disapproved but began marriage negotiations, which were interrupted by the unexpected death of Christian August shortly afterward. In September 1812, Princess Caroline was engaged to her mother's brother, the 17 years older Prince Christian of Hesse; however, the year after the engagement he suffered a mental breakdown and died in November 1814 at the age of 38. In the following years there were various marriage plans, and among the potential grooms suggested was the 28 years older British Prince William, Duke of Clarence, the future King William IV.

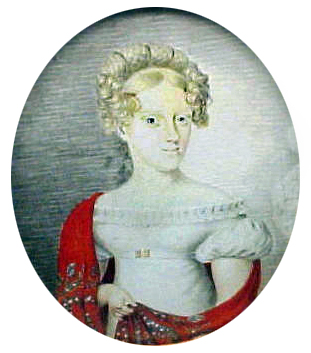
A young Princess Caroline in the 1820s.

However, the king was disinclined to consent to any foreign marriage which would remove his daughter from the country, and in 1829 he finally decided on a marriage between Princess Caroline and his own first cousin, Prince Ferdinand of Denmark. Prince Ferdinand was a younger son of the king's uncle, Hereditary Prince Frederick, and a younger brother of Prince Christian Frederik, the future King Christian VIII. As such, Prince Ferdinand was third in line to the throne, and the marriage was arranged for dynastic reasons with the aim of uniting the two branches of the Danish royal family. The couple were married on 1 August 1829 at the chapel of Frederiksberg Palace by the royal confessor Jacob Peter Mynster. After her marriage, she was no longer called crown princess until her spouse became hereditary prince.

== Married life ==
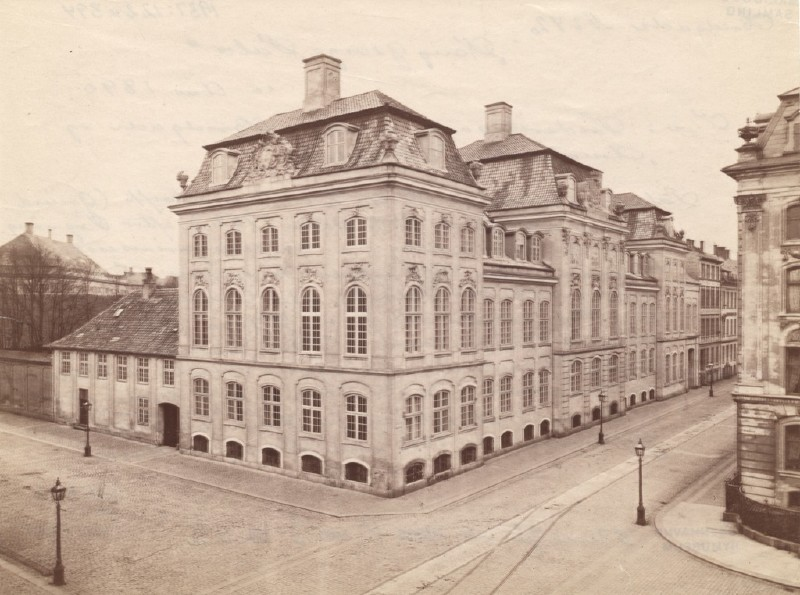
The Bernstorff Mansion on the corner of Bredgade and Frederiksgade.

The spouses lived in the Bernstorff Mansion (Danish: Det Bernstorffske Palæ) on the corner of Bredgade and Frederiksgade. It had been bought for them by King Frederick VI in 1829, and was renovated for them in the Empire style of the period by the Neoclassical Danish architect Jørgen Hansen Koch. The arranged marriage was childless but otherwise turned out to be successful in many ways, and Caroline eventually came to live quite harmoniously with her spouse. She tolerated his recurring adultery and tried her best to remedy his constant money problems. They did not play any active role at the royal court, and after her father's death in 1839, she became distanced from the court. Her spouse was given the task of escorting royal mistress Countess Danner (1815–1874) while she was estranged from the royal couple.

In 1830, Caroline suffered terrible burn injuries in a fire, which disfigured her face; her hair ornament caught fire while she was reading in her bed, and she was severely burnt in the face and hair. The damage upon her looks was permanent, and she was later to remark, when she caught a glimpse of herself in a mirror, that she was sincerely grateful that she managed to acquire any friends who could stand to look at her face. She suffered a similar burn injury in 1858 when she burned her arm and shoulder so badly, that she had great pains for the rest of her life.

Between 1831 and 1839, she presided regularly at the supervision of the troop exercises in Aarhus in which Prince Ferdinand took part as commander of a Dragoon Regiment. When her spouse was appointed General Commandant for Northern Jutland in 1839, she followed him on his inspection tour through the area's garrison towns, and was warmly received by the public. She was a skillful rider, and when she followed her spouse on his inspections of the troops in Sjælland, she paraded herself on horse before the troops.

She founded an asylum in Aarhus (1836) and became the protector of Vallø Stift in 1852.

== Hereditary Princess ==
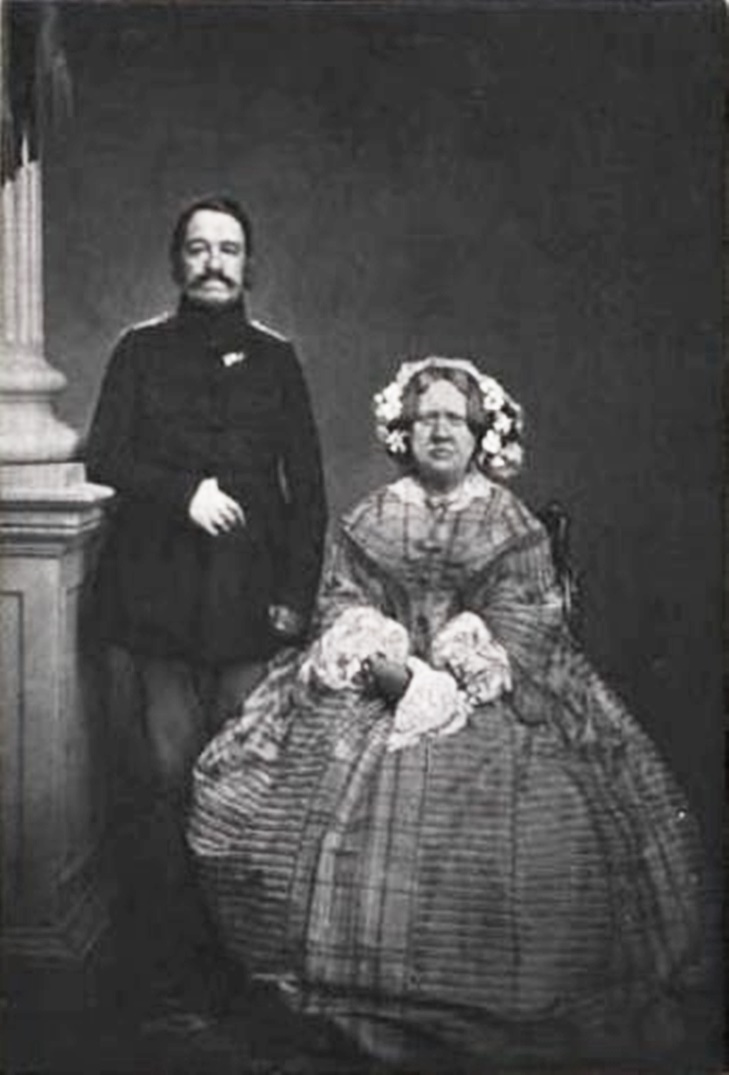
Princess Caroline and her husband Prince Ferdinand as Hereditary Prince, c. 1863

After the death of her brother-in-law King Christian VIII in 1848, his only son ascended the throne as King Frederick VII. As he had no offspring, Prince Ferdinand now became heir presumptive to the throne of Denmark and received the title of hereditary prince, and Caroline now became hereditary princess. She never became queen however, as Hereditary Prince Ferdinand died in 1863, shortly before his nephew King Frederick VII, and the throne instead passed to her first cousin, King Christian IX.

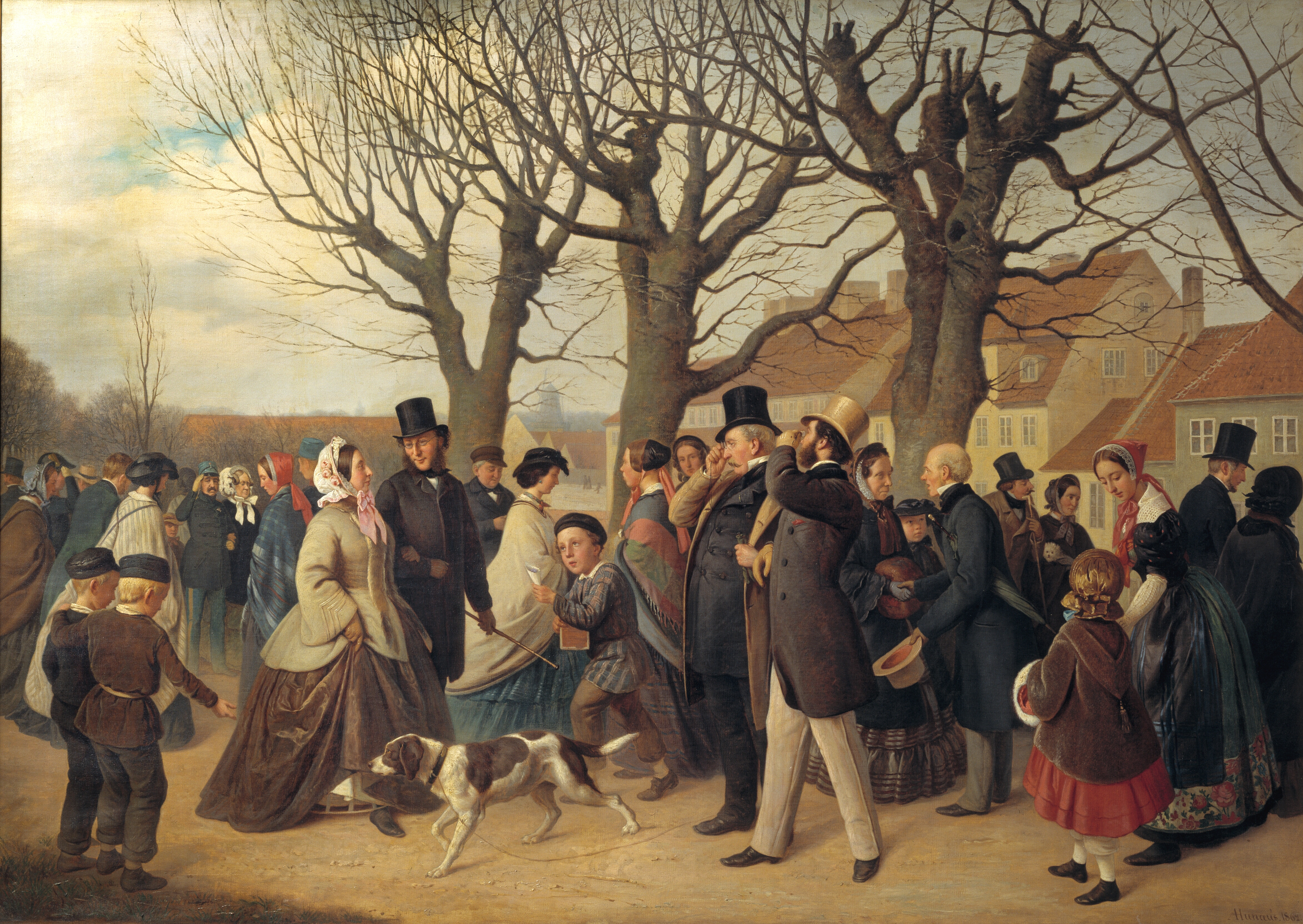
Princess Caroline and Prince Ferdinand are included in the crowd (in the background to the left) in Andreas Herman Hunæus' genre painting Promenading on the Ramparts of Copenhagen on the Evening of a Public Holiday in Spring from 1862.

She was described as loyal, content and punctual. She was especially loyal toward Copenhagen. She and her husband were the only members of the royal family who stayed during the cholera epidemic of 1853, out of loyalty to the city.

As a widow, she lived an isolated life, occupying herself by paying her husband's debts. During her final years, she became deaf. Hereditary Princess Caroline died aged 87 on 31 March 1881 in her residence in the Bernstorff Mansion in Copenhagen. She was interred in Roskilde Cathedral on the island of Zealand, the traditional burial site for Danish monarchs since the 15th century.

== Ancestry ==
Ancestors of Princess Caroline of Denmark

8. Frederick V of Denmark
4. Christian VII of Denmark
9. Princess Louise of Great Britain
2. Frederick VI of Denmark
10. Frederick, Prince of Wales
5. Princess Caroline Matilda of Great Britain
11. Princess Augusta of Saxe-Gotha
1. Princess Caroline of Denmark
12. Frederick II, Landgrave of Hesse-Kassel
6. Prince Charles of Hesse-Kassel
13. Princess Mary of Great Britain
3. Princess Marie Sophie of Hesse-Kassel
14. Frederick V of Denmark (= 8)
7. Princess Louise of Denmark
15. Princess Louise of Great Britain (= 9)
