= Louise Dannemand =

Danish noblewoman and philanthropist (1815–1884)

Christiane Louise Dannemand
- Countess of Dannemand
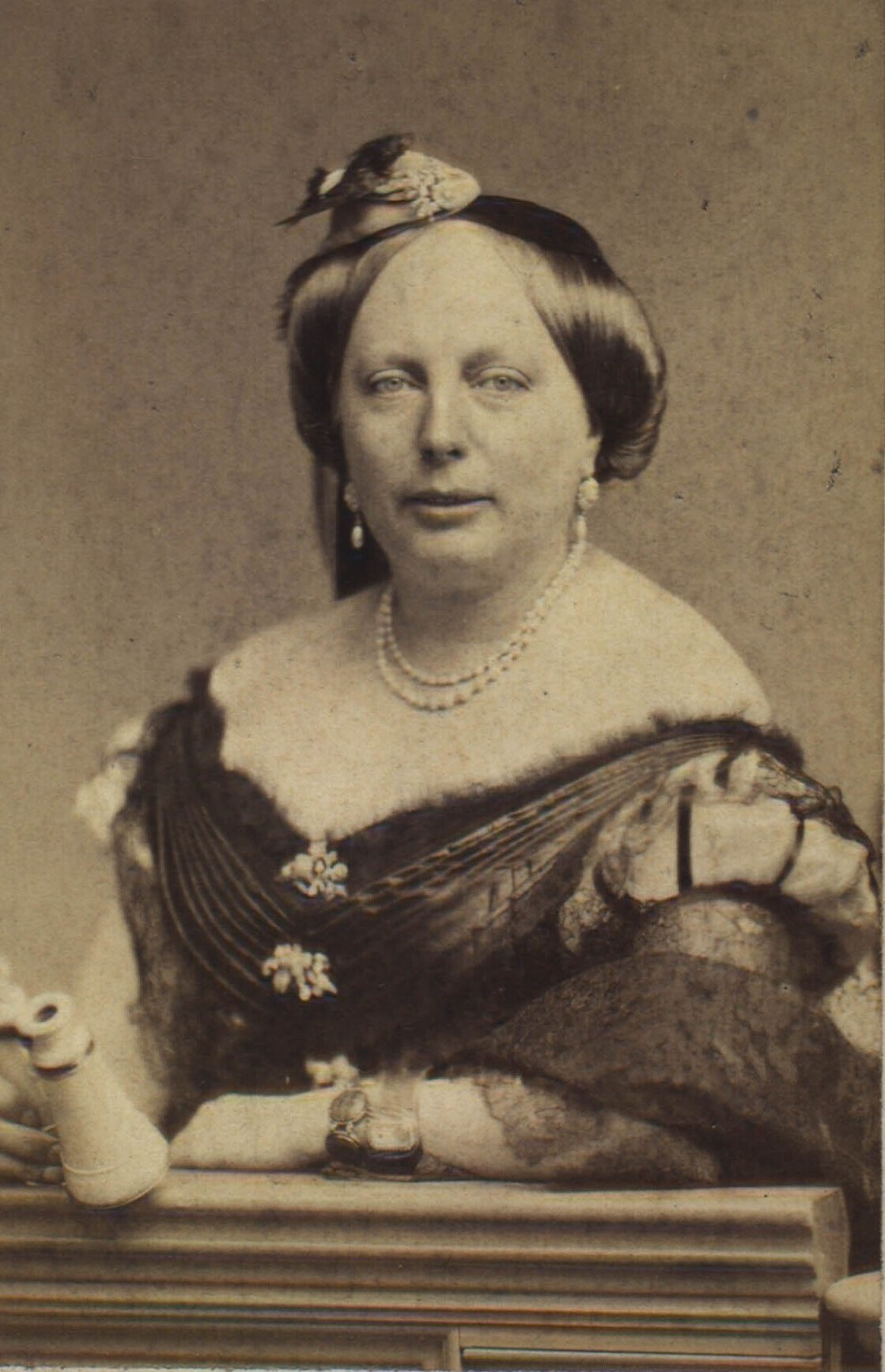
- Born: Countess Christiane Louise Schulin; 5 December 1815; Frederiksdal, Virum, Denmark
- Died: 11 July 1884 (aged 68); Vichy, France
- Buried: 26 July 1884; Søderup Cemetery, Merløse, Holbæk, Denmark
- Noble family: Schulin family
- Spouse: Frederik Wilhelm Dannemand (m. 1845–1884)
- Father: Sigismund Ludvig Schulin
- Mother: Louise Elisabeth Brown

Christiane Louise, Countess of Dannemand (née comtesse Schulin; 5 December 1815 – 11 July 1884) was a Danish noblewoman, socialite, and philanthropist. She was the second, but longest and most prominent, wife of count Frederik Wilhelm Dannemand, the ennobled illegitimate son of King Frederick VI and Frederikke Dannemand.

Born at Frederiksdal Castle, she was the fifth child and third daughter of Count Sigismund Schulin and Louise Elisabeth Brown. She grew up at the family estate in Virum, and her family maintained close connections with the Danish Royal Family, often visiting the nearby Sorgenfri Palace, Christian VIII's summer residence from 1805 to 1848.

In 1845, she wed Frederik Dannemand, becoming mistress of his recently acquired estate, Aastrup manor. In contrast to her husband, who was of a peaceable disposition and preoccupied with his horses, she was an avid socialite, active and well connected in Denmark's upper social circles. She also corresponded with cultural figures, such as Lorenz Frølich, Pietro Krohn, and Hans Christian Andersen. Contemporaries describe her as voluble, outspoken and possessing a notoriety for excessive candour. In his memoirs, Privy Councillor J. P. Trap called her “very uninhibited, yet of a pleasant disposition and not without ability”. At a dinner party with the King and Queen, she famously alluded to King Frederick VII’s lack of exposure to “proper company”, prompting the King to jokingly exclaim that he had forgotten he was speaking to “the shrew of Aastrup”.

She devoted much of her life to philanthropy. With her husband, she created the Comital Dannemand Foundation (Danish: Det grevelige Dannemandske Stift), a charitable institution for indigent women and daughters of military officers; as of 2025 the foundation still owns Aastrup. In 1865, she was among the leading noblewomen who organized and funded a charitable asylum and school on Rigensgade, to mark the fiftieth anniversary of Queen Caroline Amalie’s arrival in Denmark. Following the 1872 Baltic Sea flood, she served on the Central Committee (Danish: centralkomite), arranging recovery efforts, including a charitable bazaar at Christiansborg Palace.

Later in life she developed an interest in archaeology, supporting and travelling with the English archaeologist Sir John Evans, as well as corresponding with Jens J. A. Worsaae, director of the National Museum of Denmark. She died in 1884, aged 68, while on holiday at the mineral springs in Vichy, France. Her widower later remarried.

== Early life and education ==
Christiane Louise Schulin was born a comtesse (Danish: komtesse) on 5 December 1815 at the family estate of Frederiksdal in Virum, Zealand, Denmark. She was baptised in Kongens Lyngby Church on 30 May 1816. She was the third daughter of Lensgreve Sigismund Ludvig Schulin (1777–1836), head of the Schulin family and holder of the Frederiksdal entail, and his wife Louise Elisabeth Brown (1785–1851), a descendant of Scottish-Danish merchant, John Brown (1723–1808). Louise had three brothers and three sisters and grew up in the affluent environment of Frederiksdal.

She was named after an aunt, who died in 1813.

== Marriage and social position ==
On 13 June 1845, she married Frederik Wilhelm Dannemand in Holmen Church, Copenhagen. Her husband, born in 1813, was the illegitimate son of King Frederick VI of Denmark and his longtime mistress Frederikke Dannemand. He had been created a count (lensgreve) in 1830 and served as an officer in the Royal Danish Army. Contemporary sources described that the match with Louise, a comtesse from an established noble house, was socially advantageous; it aligned the king's illegitimate son with the titled nobility. On the wedding she became a so-called feudal countess (Danish: lensgrevinde), the highest noble title in Denmark, as well as mistress of Aastrup, the entailed estate her husband had bought in 1842.

The couple had no children. Louise became stepmother to her husband's illegitimate daughter Frederikke Kirederf Dannemand, who resided at Aastrup from 1862 to 1869, and managed the household and estate affairs at Aastrup.

== Role as countess and society figure ==
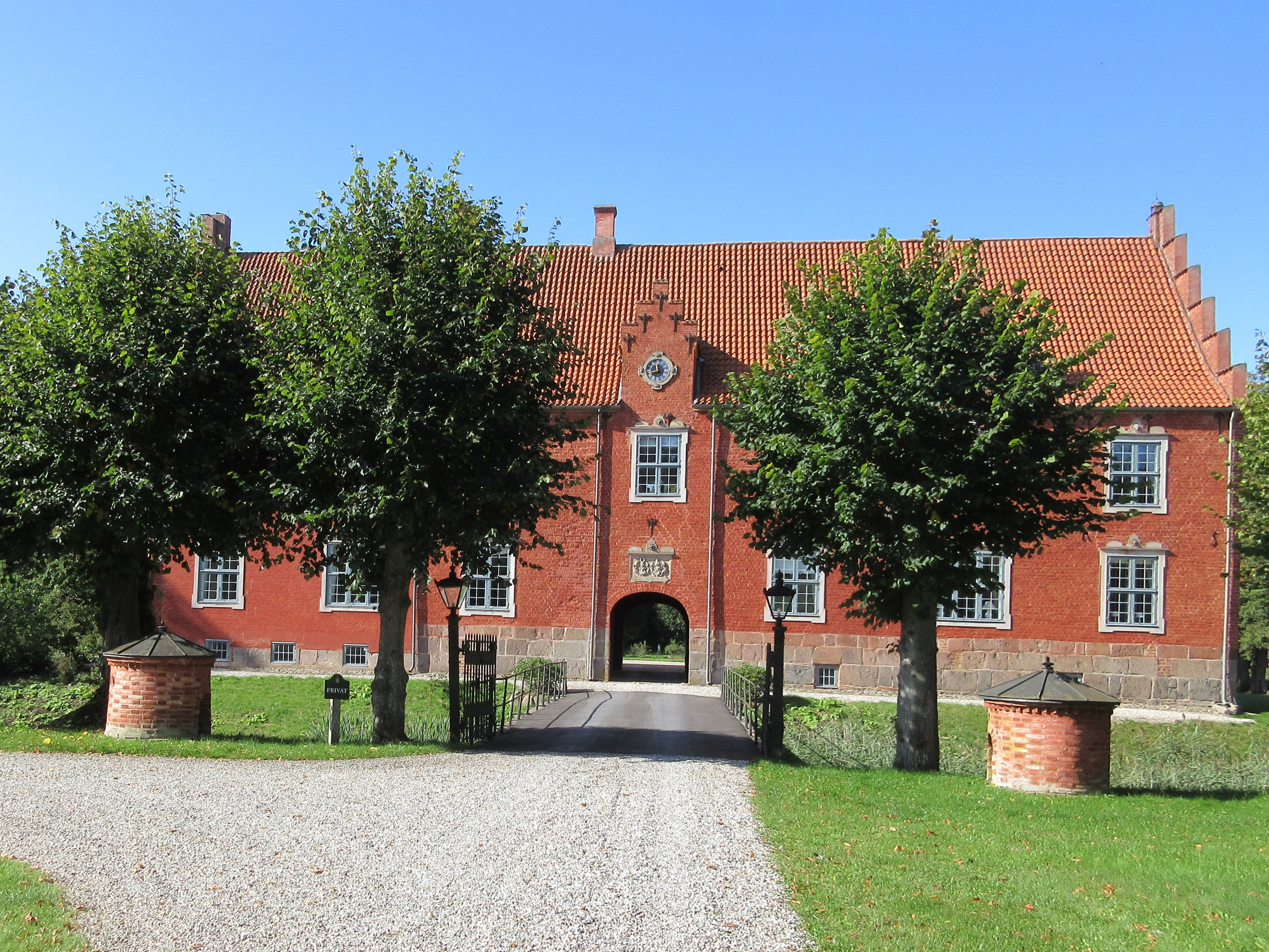
Entrance to Aastrup manor, where Countess Louise lived with her husband from 1845 to 1884.

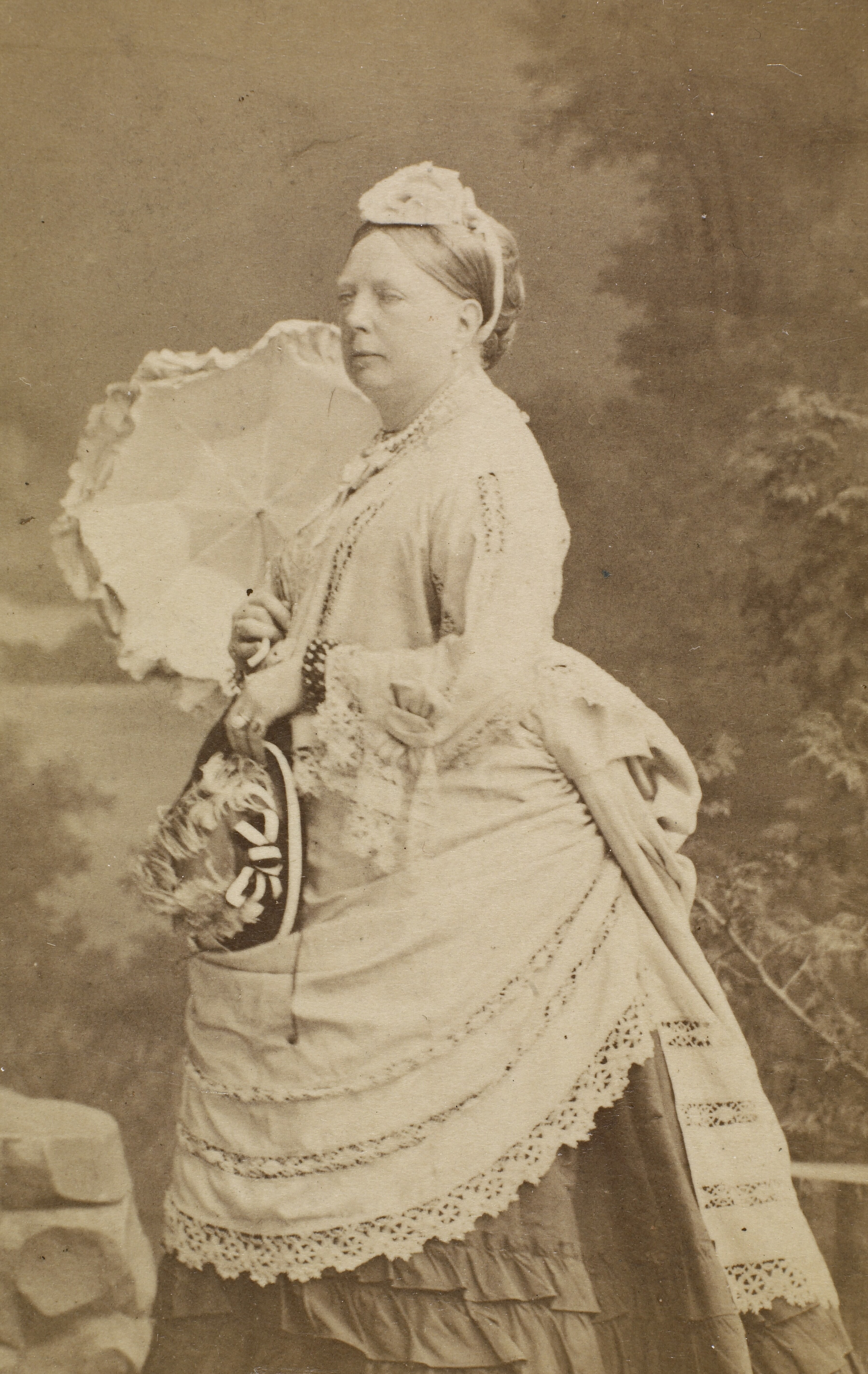
Portrait of Louise Dannemand, photographed by Georg Emil Hansen.

Countess Dannemand was active in social life. In his memoirs, cabinet secretary Jens Peter Trap remarked that she was known for her strong voice and talkative manner and for being a formidable hostess. Contemporary diarists compared her to the eccentric Generalinde Bülow but noted that she was less amusing than that lady, though she possessed a striking presence and was capable of coarse language.

The countess accompanied her husband on court and diplomatic occasions. In 1865 she travelled with him to Stockholm when he received the Commander's Cross of the Norwegian Order of St. Olav. At a time of tense Danish‑Swedish relations, the trip generated gossip in Copenhagen. She remarked that the fuss made it seem as if her husband were being treated like another Corfitz Ulfeldt, a 17th‑century traitor married to the king's illegitimate daughter. According to Trap, she became well acquainted with Charles XV of Sweden during the 1865 visit. He gifted her Parian ware set, consisting of at least two jugs, an urn, a number of cups and other items. She later donated most of it to Rosenborg Castle.

Countess Dannemand was involved in the Queen Dowager Caroline Amalie’s Asylum and School in Copenhagen. In 1865 she joined the ladies’ committee that raised money for the new asylum building and acted as spokesperson when plans and drawings were presented to the queen at Sorgenfri Palace. She took part in laying the foundation stone on 15 July 1865 and later co‑signed the deed transferring the completed property to the institution. At the building's inauguration she donated a portrait of the queen by the painter Johan Vilhelm Gertner.

In 1870, the couple also gave an artwork by Thorvaldsen, Christus i Emaus, as well as an organ, to the church at Aastrup. Together with her husband she built a summer pavilion, known locally as The Countess' Pavilion (Danish: Lensgrevindens pavillon), near Aastrup after studying examples at Liselund.

In Hans Christian Andersen’s diary (1871) she is listed among those "who appertain directly to the Royal House", a very limited circle of individuals. She was reportedly on close terms with her future father-in-law, King Frederick VI, who confided in her, and on several occasions is said to have remarked to her: "How much would I not have given for Prince Christian (later Christian IX) to have been my son! Truly, it would have been a blessing". After the early death of Christian's father, Duke Friedrich Wilhelm, Frederick VI became one of his legal guardians.

The countess, in addition to her literary and cultural pursuits, was fond of travelling, venturing as far afield as Morocco. In Rome, she occasionally visited her Danish friend Princess Adelaide Pignatelli, née Nathan David, wife of Georg Gerson until 1825, and from 1826 wife of Prince Antonio Pignatelli-Ruffo, former ambassador of the Kingdom of the Two Sicilies to Denmark.

=== Archaeological interests ===
Countess Louise Dannemand attended the 1874 International Congress of Anthropology and Prehistoric Archaeology in Stockholm and later joined Sir John Evans and his family at the Lisbon congress. During Evans's 1882 visit to Denmark, he stayed at Aastrup, the Dannemand estate. Although no personal papers survive, she was personally acquainted with Jens Jacob Asmussen Worsaae, director of the National Museum of Denmark.

== Character and description ==
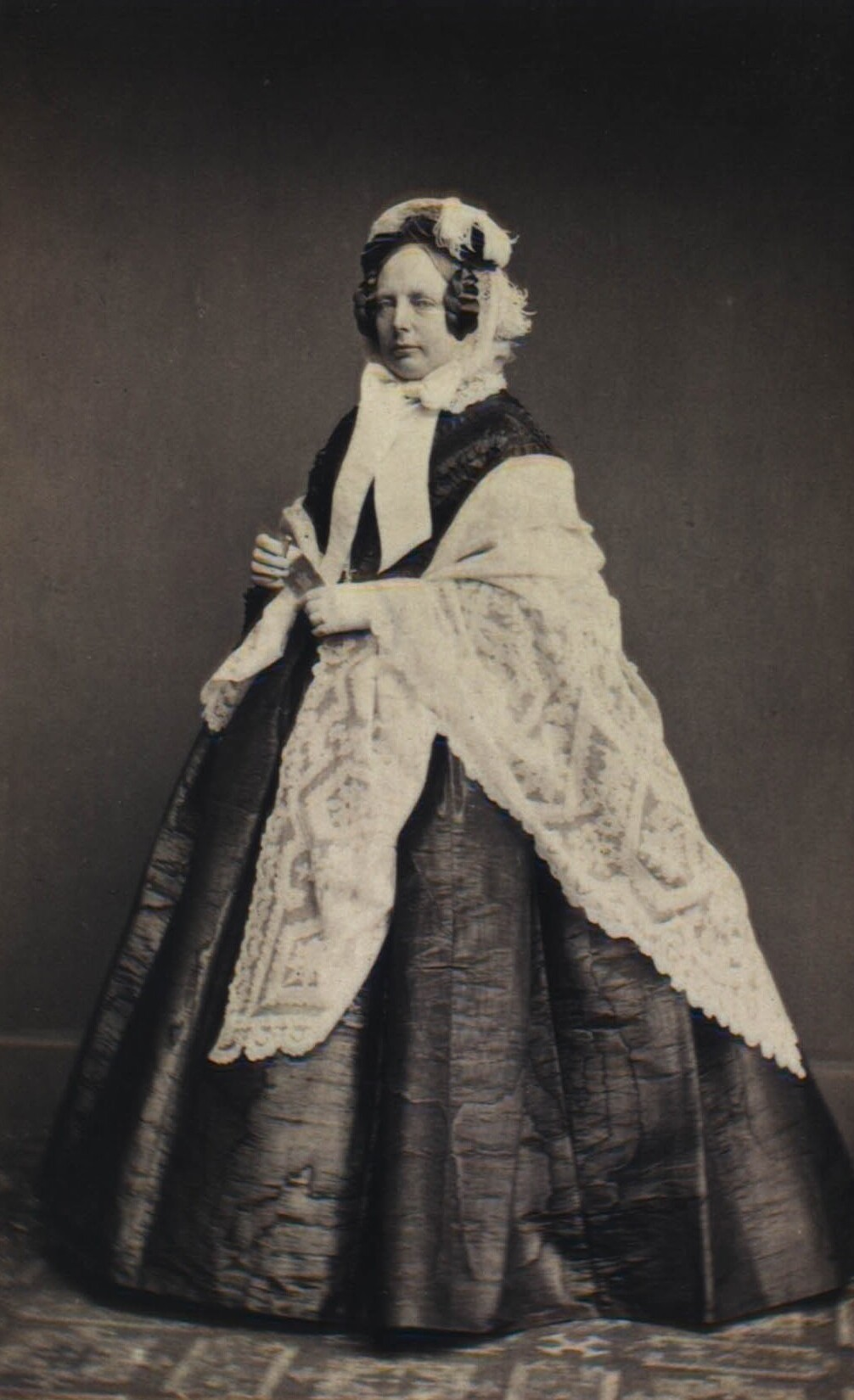
Portrait of Countess Christiane Louise Dannemand (née Schulin), photographed by Frederik Ferdinand Petersen, c. 1860–1884.

Contemporary and later testimony presents Countess Dannemand as socially confident, outspoken, and effective, with assessments ranging from admiration for her energy and charity to criticism of her blunt manner. Early in Privy Councillor, J. P. Trap’s memoirs she is characterised as "very dégagé, yet of a pleasant disposition and not without ability". In the same work Trap elsewhere adds the pointed observation: "It could not escape anyone's notice that he [Frederik W. Dannemand] was below average in ability; whether she was above average, I do not know, I only know that she spoke for several and had a voice strong enough for just as many... it made a nerve-racking impression to listen to it".

A recent historical article echoes this profile, noting that "with Louise Schulin, Dannemand gained a well-educated, energetic and particularly quick-witted wife, but also a spouse who was clearly aware of her human obligations". One account describes how Countess Dannemand "drank beer liberally at various times of the day and was also very fond of cognac".

Artists’ testimony is more accommodating. During a visit to Tranekær manor in the summer of 1878, the painter Otto Bache described her as " a splendid person, witty and clever" and drew a pencil portrait of her. He also repeated an anecdote about her managing an imprudent husband: "(...) She had her share of trouble with her frivolous husband, and it was said that she had once taken the sensible course of giving him a well-deserved beating".

Obituaries emphasised popularity and philanthropy: "(...) the deceased was much liked in wide circles for her plain, unpretentious manner and for her great charity." Count Frederik Ahlefeldt-Laurvig noted her preference for society over rural quiet: "Dannemand would have preferred to live quietly at Aastrup, but this did not suit his wife, who was very socially inclined. She filled Aastrup with a motley company."

=== Candour at court ===
Accounts also record a reputation for candour at court. One source summarises: "Countess Louise Dannemand was, in her own way, as well liked as her husband, but she had an indomitable desire to speak her mind. Even at court, her sharp tongue was feared." It continues with an oft-repeated exchange at a soirée with Dowager Queen Caroline Amalie, in which Frederick VII greeted her:

Frederick VII: "Good evening, my dear Countess, it is so rare that we meet; how can that be?"

Countess Dannemand: "It must be because Your Majesty so seldom comes into decent company."

Frederick VII: "Thunder and damnation, you can bet your life that it’s the shrew from Aastrup."

Finally, Trap's later volume places her, by comparison, among the last forceful originals of high society, judging that "Such originals we no longer have in high society; Countess Dannemand is no match (...), but she is also not as amusing (...) In any case, I have only experienced her being coarse, but she truly had a gift for it."

== Later life and death ==
She managed Aastrup until her death, and spent later years abroad. She died while visiting the mineral spring in Vichy, France, on 11 July 1884. She was buried on 26 July 1884 in the churchyard at Søderup near Aastrup in western Zealand.
