= Frederik Wilhelm Dannemand =

Danish count and army officer (1813–1888)

- Lensgreve of Dannemand
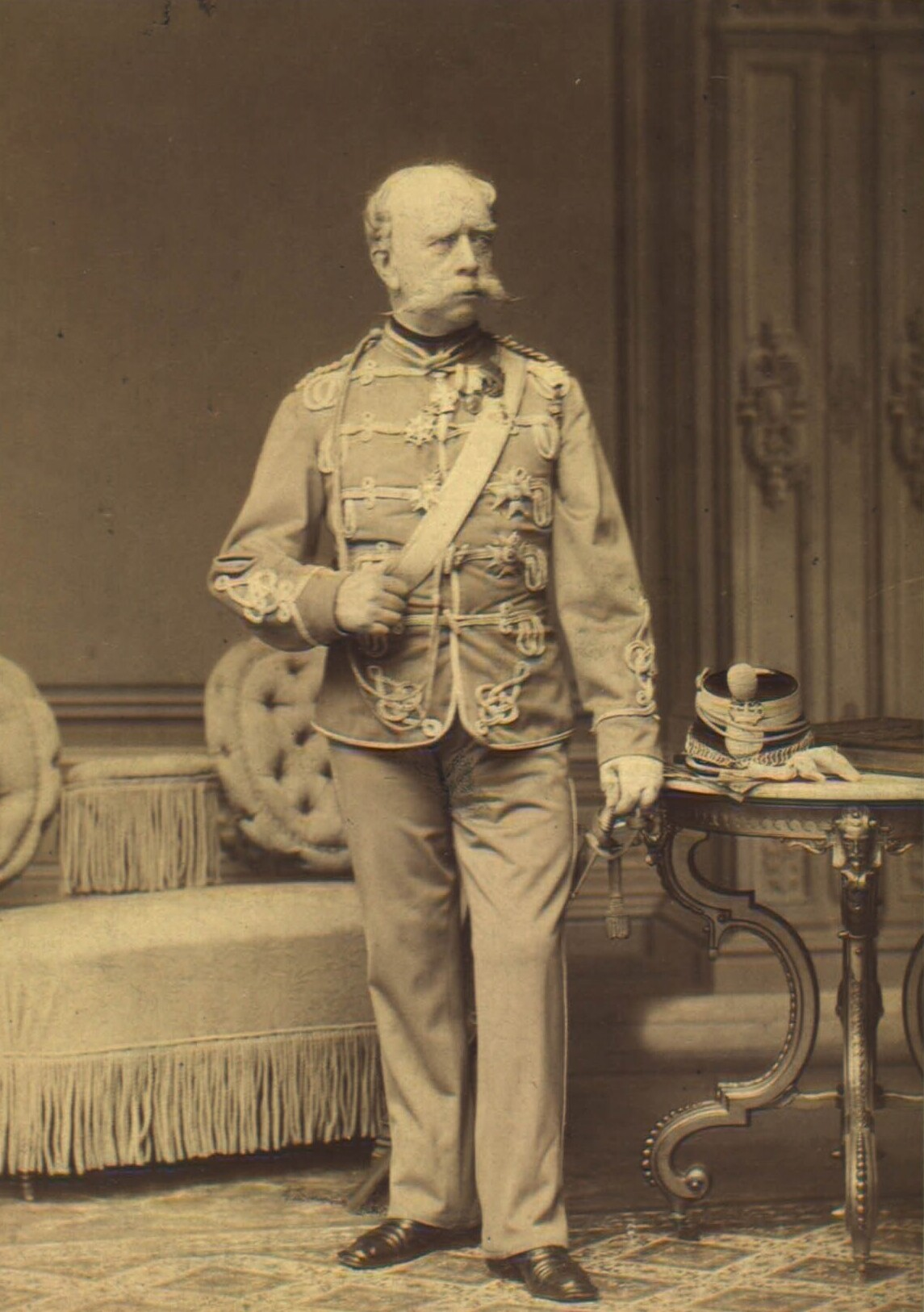
- Dannemand in military uniform, 1877
- Born: 20 June 1813; Copenhagen, Denmark
- Died: 12 March 1888 (aged 74); Aastrup Manor, near Tølløse, Denmark
- Buried: Søderup Cemetery, near Tølløse
- Noble family: Dannemand family
- Spouses: Francisca von Scholten (m. 1840; died 1844) Countess Christiane Louise Schulin (m. 1845; died 1884) Regine Vilhelmine Margrethe Laursen (m. 1884; died 1886)
- Issue: Frederikke Kirederf Dannemand (illegitimate)
- Father: Frederick VI of Denmark
- Mother: Bente Frederikke Dannemand (née Rafsted)

Frederik Wilhelm Dannemand (ennobled lensgreve Dannemand; 20 June 1813 – 12 March 1888) was a Danish nobleman, landowner, military officer, and the third illegitimate child, but eldest and only surviving son of Frederick VI of Denmark and his mistress Frederikke Dannemand.

Born in Copenhagen, he was raised by his mother close to Amalienborg, before being enrolled at the Royal Danish Military Academy at the age of twelve. In 1830 he and his siblings were formally admitted to the Danish nobility in recognition of their royal paternity, and in 1839 he was elevated to the comital rank of lensgreve (feudal count) by royal rescript. He later established the Comital Dannemand Entail (Danish: Det grevelige Dannemandske Forlods) and acquired the estate of Aastrup on Zealand, where he, with his wife Louise Schulin, founded a charitable institution for indigent women and daughters of military officers. He entered the Royal Danish Army in 1826 and served until 1863, attaining the brevet rank of lieutenant colonel, and was appointed chamberlain in 1848. He married three times but died without legitimate issue in 1888.

Following the death in 1863 of his second cousin Frederick VII, the last reigning monarch of the senior Oldenburg line, the Danish throne passed to the distant agnatic kinsman, Christian IX of the Glücksburg branch. In subsequent decades Dannemand was sometimes referred to as "The Last Oldenburger" (Danish: Den sidste Oldenborger), even though he was illegitimate and survived by his elder sister Louise Frederikke by a few months. His death in 1888 marked the extinction of the Dannemand family in the male line, though descendants of his sisters remain extant.

== Early life and education ==
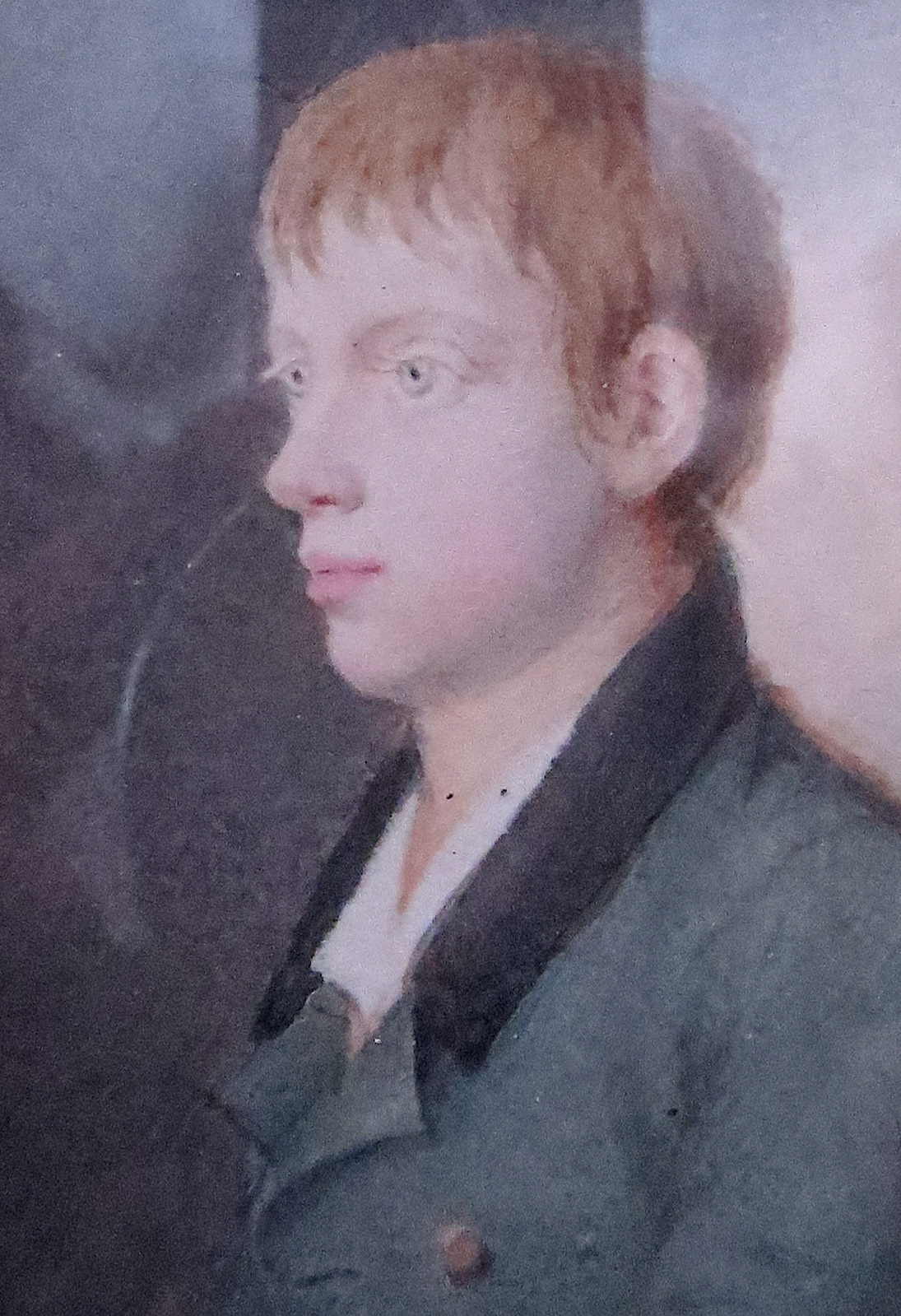
Portrait of a young Frederik Vilhelm Dannemand in 1821.

Frederik Wilhelm Dannemand was born on 20 June 1813 in Copenhagen and was baptized five days later at the Royal Maternity Foundation. He was the eldest son of King Frederik VI and his long-time official mistress Bertha Frederikke Dannemand (née Bente Mortensdatter Andersen, 1792–1862). His father openly acknowledged the liaison and the children.

He had two elder sisters, Louise Frederikke Dannemand (16 April 1810 – 28 December 1888), who married to Captain Vilhelm Zachariae, and Caroline Augusta Dannemand (24 January 1812 – 29 February 1844), who married chamberlain and major Adolph Frederik Schack von Brockdorff (1810–1859). Six years after his birth, his mother gave birth to another son, Frederik Waldemar Dannemand (6 January 1819 – 4 March 1835), who died unmarried. He and his siblings were formally admitted into the Danish nobility on 4 February 1830.

His childhood and youth are sparsely documented but indicate an upbringing under discreet royal supervision. He was raised in Copenhagen by his mother in a residence on Toldbodvej no. 289 (now Esplanaden) near Amalienborg, maintained with royal funding and domestic staff. The house would later become the Copenhagen residence of Council President, Jacob Brønnum Scavenius Estrup. His education was conducted privately, with instruction in subjects including French, Latin, and religion provided by tutors such as Pastor Petersen of the Kastellet. The king visited frequently and took an active interest in the children's education. During the Dano-Swedish War in 1813, when the king departed for Holstein amid fears of invasion, he entrusted his cousin, Prince Ferdinand, with safeguarding Madame Dannemand and her children. Following a brief estrangement, the king resumed regular visits in 1818–19. Summers were spent at Skovgården in Ordrup where tutors accompanied the family, and leisure activities included excursions to Dyrehavsbakken and bathing in the Øresund.

At the age of 12, on 25 June 1826, he was enrolled as a cadet at the Royal Danish Military Academy (Landkadetakademiet) to train as an officer. Dannemand became a second lieutenant à la suite in the Guard Hussar Regiment in 1830, was promoted to first lieutenant in 1835, received brevet rank as rittmeister (captain) in 1838 and major in 1840, and ended his career in 1863 as a brevet lieutenant‑colonel.

== Elevation to comital nobility ==
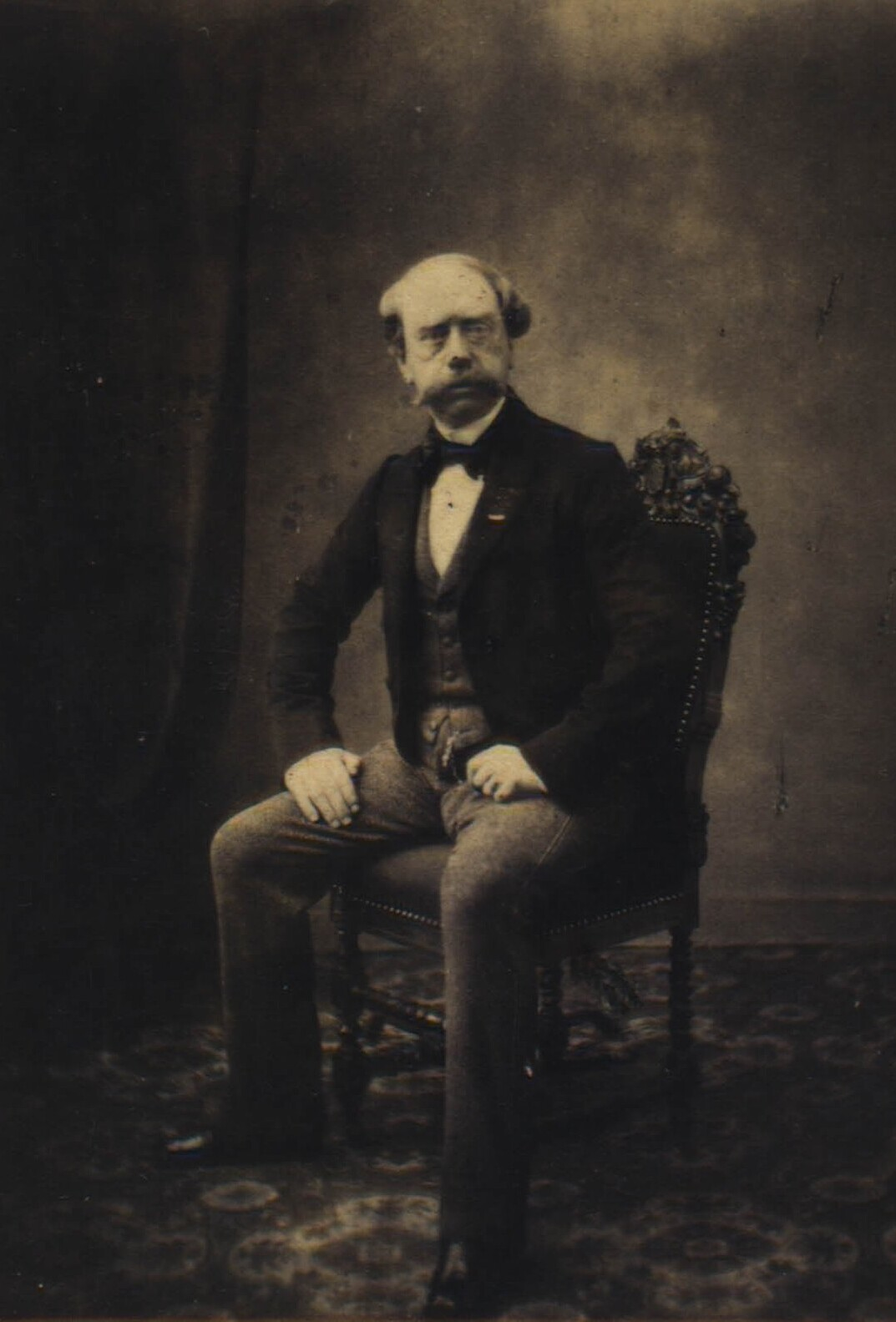
Frederik W. Dannemand in his older days.

Dannemand was elevated to the comital rank (lensgreve) by a secret royal rescript dated 3 October 1839, issued by his father, King Frederik VI, less than two months before the king's death. Lensgreve is the highest title of nobility in Denmark, and broadly comparable to that of dukes in other European countries. The matter was handled by Police Director A. C. Kierulff, who was ordered not to disclose the rescript until after the king's death. A sealed counterpart was also sent to the Danish Chancellery with instructions not to open it prematurely. No formal patent (Danish: grevebrev) appears to have been issued. After the 1848 regime change, Dannemand submitted a petition to Justice Minister C. E. Bardenfleth requesting the erection of a formal county (Danish: grevskab). On 9 February 1849, the Council of State declined to issue a patent, citing the new 1849 constitution's prohibition on the creation of new fiefs, but did not dispute his right to use the title lensgreve under the terms of the 1839 rescript.

The 1839 rescript granted him and any legitimate descendants the right to bear a count's arms and enjoy the privileges of a Danish feudal count, provided he created a comital endowment (Danish: forlods) of 120.000 rigsdaler, of which 70.000 had to be invested in 4% government bonds and the remainder be paid from Frederik's maternal inheritance. He later bought Aastrup manor on Zealand in 1842, and secured royal permission to mortgage the endowment on the estate.

Already in 1828 Frederick VI and the Danish Chancellery examined creating a comital entail for his sons, looking specifically at the Fyn estates Frederiksgave and Flenstofte (acquired by the Crown from J. C. Ryberg in 1824). The scheme was shelved; Frederiksgave later served as Crown Prince Frederick’s summer residence.

=== Aastrup manor and charitable foundations ===
Count Dannemand bought Aastrup manor on Zealand in 1842 from Count Sigfred Victor Raben (1797-1866), for 195.000 rigsdaler. He had the south wing of the main building constructed in 1856. He spent part of the summer at Aastrup manor, but resided for most of the year in his apartment on Bredgade in Copenhagen.

In accordance with the conditions of his comital title, Dannemand established the Comital Dannemand Entail (Danish: Det grevelige Dannemandske Forlods) in 1840. Anticipating the absence of direct heirs, he and his wife, by testament of 20 July 1857, founded a charitable endowment, the Comital Dannemand Foundation (Danish: Det grevelige Dannemandske Stift), also known as Aastrup Kloster. The foundation, or stift, endowed Aastrup Manor and the adjoining farm Nyerupgård as a residential institution for indigent women, organised on a convent-like model. It was designed to house a prioress and five unmarried gentlewomen, each provided with free accommodation and a modest allowance. Provision was also made for four widows and four additional unmarried women, bringing the total to fourteen residents. Admission was restricted to impoverished female relatives of Dannemand or his three wives, and to destitute daughters of Danish officers.

From its inception, the foundation struggled with persistent financial difficulties. It was hinted that Frederik was "a bit extravagant in financial matters". In 1884, shortly before his death, Count Dannemand sold Aastrup to his nephew Frederik Brockdorff in an attempt to resolve the institution's fiscal problems. The transaction, however, led to litigation, and the sale was ultimately annulled in 1890. Thereafter, the estate was placed under official administration, and the foundation remained dormant until the estate's economy had sufficiently recovered. In 1928, the stift was formally revived, operating under the name Aastrup Kloster, and today accepts both men and women, primarily from the Dannemand family (descendants of his two sisters).

=== Contact with the royal family ===
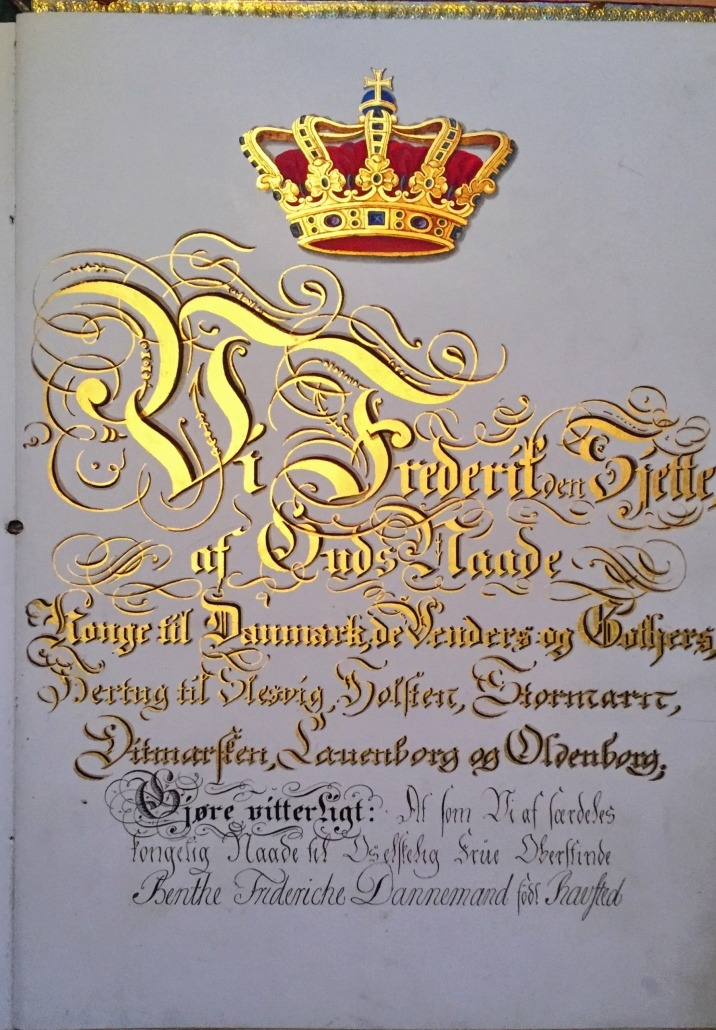
Dannemand's letter of ennoblement.

Although ennobled and elevated to the comital rank, Dannemand's relationship with the royal court was limited and remains only partially documented. Unlike earlier illegitimate children of Danish monarchs, he appears to have lived a comparatively discreet life with little public prominence, though he maintained some personal contact with members of the royal family. In 1834 he accompanied his father, King Frederick VI, on a tour of Jutland, and in 1844, following the death of his first wife, he was received by King Christian VIII, who recorded in his diary: “(...) I add further that Major Dannemand has been with me, and that, following his initial outburst of grief, I found him composed”.

From his early twenties he was admitted to royal residences, including the Bernstorff Mansion, home of his half-sister Princess Caroline and her husband Ferdinand, Hereditary Prince of Denmark. While Princess Caroline initially avoided contact with her father's former mistress, she later accepted Frederik Dannemand's presence at court. Both she and her sister Vilhelmine, daughters of Frederick VI, appear to have established relations with their half-siblings only after the king's death. Frederick VI is reported to have taken a particular interest in his only adult son, who in youth was noted for a certain physical resemblance to the king.

Frederick VI supported the Dannemand family by setting up in 1837 a state-bond fund worth 325,986 rigsdaler for Madame Dannemand and her younger children, to be paid out on marriage or adulthood; a similar fund for the eldest daughter had been created in 1836, with interest as her only benefit.

In his memoirs, Privy Councillor and cabinet secretary Jens Peter Trap described that during the last months of Frederick VI’s life in late 1839, the entire Dannemand family visited Amalienborg Palace "nightly", lodging with the royal valet, Westergaard, who was involved in the matter.

Perlen (Danish: the "Pearl"), the white parade horse of Frederick VII, was taxidermied after the king's death in 1863 and passed through several exhibitions before being purchased in 1873 by Lensgreve Dannemand. At the time, new stables were under construction following a major fire at the Aastrup estate, and the horse was later installed there. After Dannemand's death in 1888, Perlen was sold at the 1890 Copenhagen Circus Building auction, complete with its caparison and curb bridle, as one of over 800 lots from his estate.

=== 1865 Stockholm visit ===
In 1865, the Count and Countess Dannemand visited Stockholm, where he was awarded the Commander’s Cross of the Norwegian Order of St. Olav by Charles XV of Sweden and Norway, interpreted as a reminder of his father’s former kingship of Norway. The Countess engaged in friendly conversation with Charles XV, and the visit prompted comment and grumbling in Copenhagen. Upon returning, Countess Dannemand remarked that “it was as if Dannemand were another Corfitz Ulfeldt,” referring to the 17th-century statesman whose defection to Sweden made his name synonymous with treason. Privy Councillor Adam Holsten-Charisius responded with a widely noted rejoinder, downplaying the comparison and offering a more benign interpretation.

== Marriages and illegitimate issue ==
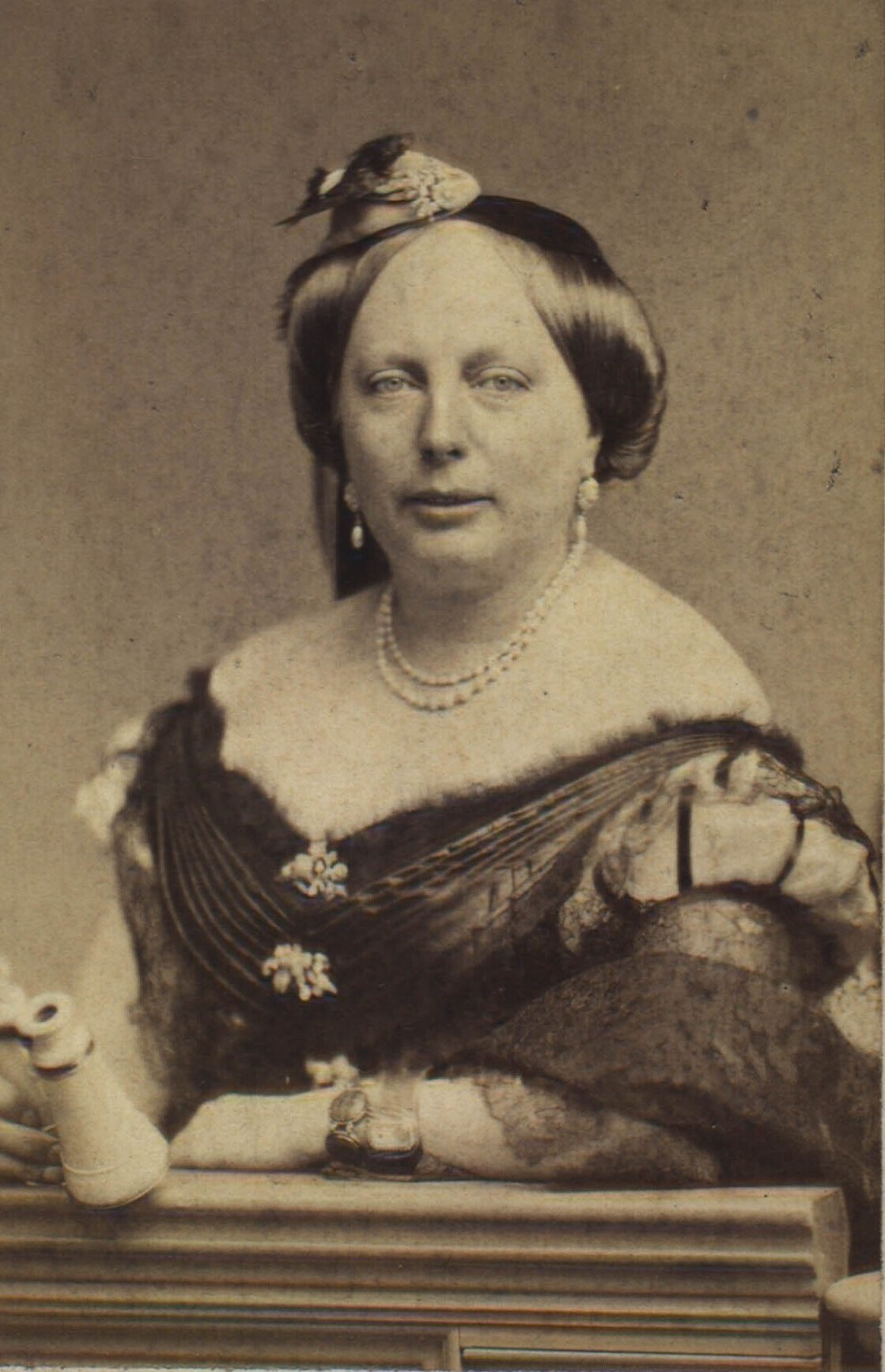
Countess Louise Dannemand (née Schulin), the second and longest spouse of Frederik W. Dannemand.

Frederik Vilhelm Dannemand contracted three marriages over the course of his life, all childless.

On 10 July 1840, Frederik Dannemand married Francisca von Scholten, daughter of Peter von Scholten, Governor-General of the Danish West Indies by his wife Anne Elisabeth 'Lise' Thortsen. The union lasted less than four years, ending with her death on 12 June 1844 from tuberculosis.

On 13 June 1845 at Holmen Church, Dannemand married Countess Christiane Louise Schulin (1815 – 4 June 1884), daughter of Count Sigismund Ludvig Schulin of Frederiksdal and Louise Elisabeth Brown. The Schulin family belonged to the Danish high nobility, and the marriage, although childless, was long-lasting. Through his marriage to Countess Schulin, Count Dannemand also became the brother-in-law of one of the country's largest landowners, lensgreve and Privy Councillor Frederik Ahlefeldt-Laurvig of Tranekær (1817–1889), who was married to Christiane Louise's sister.

In his memoirs, Jens Peter Trap also writes about the couple that “it could not escape anyone’s notice that he was below standard in ability; whether she was above standard, I do not know, I only know that she spoke for several and had the vocal strength of just as many … it made a nerve-attacking impression to listen to it”.

Following the death of his second wife on 4 June 1884, Dannemand married, on 18 October the same year, Regine Vilhelmine Margrethe Laursen (née Nielsen; 1840–1886), a commoner who had been twice widowed. She died on 24 October 1886, two years after the wedding, likewise without issue. She was buried in Søderup Cemetery near Aastrup, where Dannemand himself would be interred upon his death two years later.

=== Illegitimate daughter ===
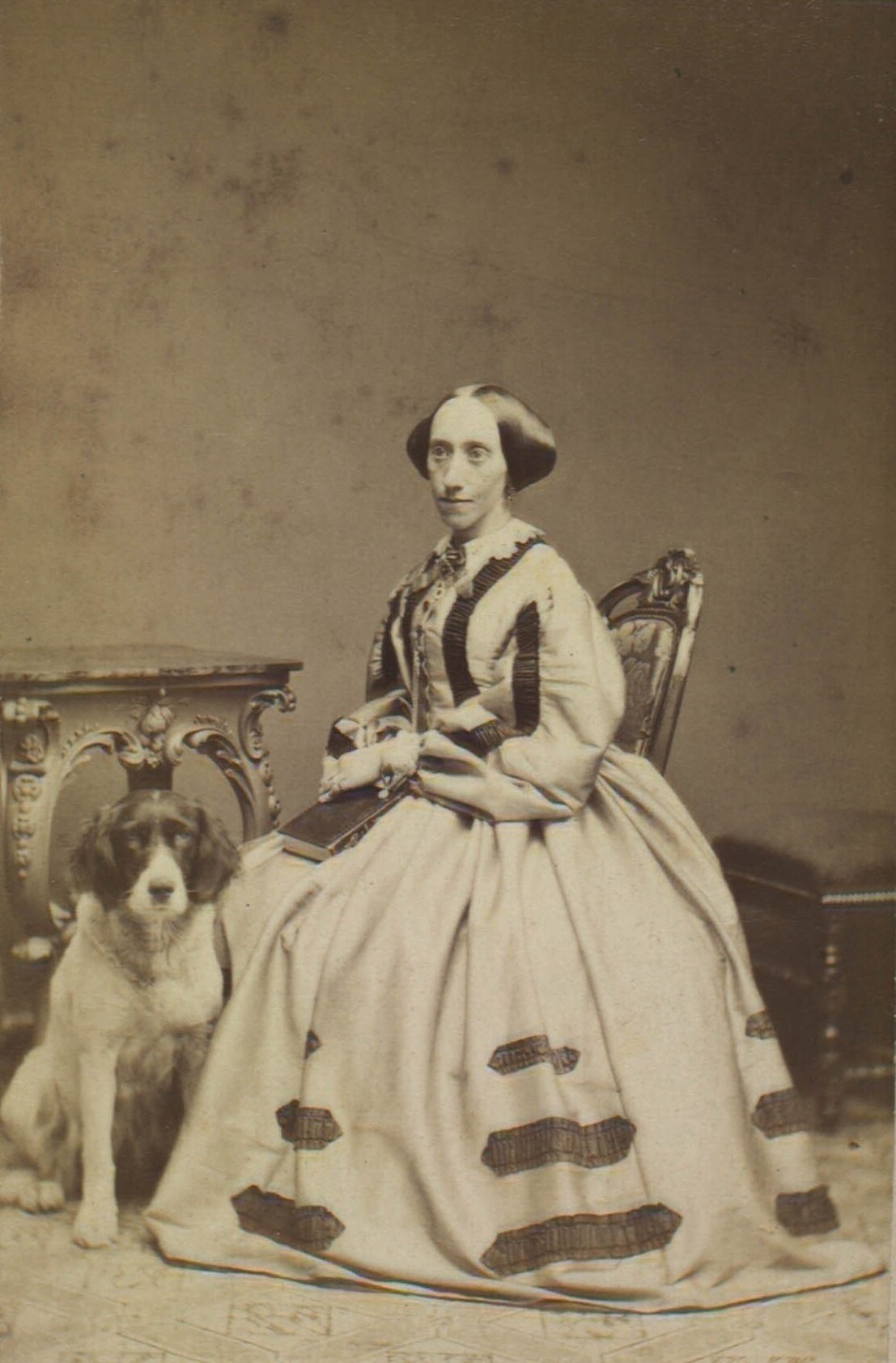
Frederikke Kirederf Dannemand (1832–1864), the illegitimate daughter of Frederik W. Dannemand. Adopted by her namesake grandmother, Frederikke Dannemand, whom she addressed her as mother, and King Frederick VI as her father.

Frederik is believed to have had an illegitimate daughter, Frederikke Kirederf Dannemand, born on 21 September 1832 in Copenhagen. Her middle name, Kirederf, is “Frederik” spelled backwards. Contemporary accounts identify her mother as probably Marie Christensen, later married to stocking-weaver Rasmus Nielsen.

In early 1839, Frederikke was formally adopted by her paternal grandmother, Bente Frederikke Dannemand, and brought up at the family residence on Toldbodvej together with Frederik's younger siblings. She was baptized and confirmed under the name “Frederikke Kirederf” and was recorded in census registers as a “daughter” of the household. A royal rescript of 11 November 1839 granted her the right to bear the coat of arms of the Dannemand family, as conferred on the family at its ennoblement, while explicitly excluding succession rights; King Frederick VI of Denmark stated that she should be “regarded as one of [his] own children.”

After her adoptive mother's death in 1862, she settled at Aastrup Manor near Tølløse, Frederik's comital seat, and inherited 25,000 rigsdaler from Madame Dannemand's estate. She lived there until her death in 1869 at the age of 37, unmarried and without issue, and was buried at Søderup Kirkegård, the family burial ground.

== Honours ==
He was appointed chamberlain in 1848. The following orders and decorations are recorded for Dannemand.

National orders and decorations

- (Denmark) Order of the Dannebrog:
  - Knight (Ridder), 1875.
  - Commander, 2nd Class, 1876.
  - Commander, 1st Class, 1878.

Foreign orders and decorations

- (Norway) Order of St. Olav: with star.
- (Sweden) Order of the Sword.
- (Kingdom of Hanover) Royal Guelphic Order: Knight.

== Death ==
Frederik Vilhelm Dannemand died on 12 March 1888 at Aastrup Manor near Tølløse, aged 74. He was buried in the family plot at Søderup Cemetery, adjoining the parish church of Søderup, where his second and third wives were also interred.
