= Peder Bild =

Danish landowner and lensmann

Peder Bild (died before or in 1566) was a Danish landowner and lensmann. He owned Sonnerupgaard and was lensmann of a number of fiefs in Denmark and Norway.

He was the son of privy counsellor Niels Bold of Ravnholt (died 1540) and Beate Eggertsdatter Ulfeldt (died 1555). He was the brother of Evert Bild.

Bild spent a few years as a courtier in an early age. He was lensmann of Riberhus in 1554–57, Odensegård in 1557–59. In 1559, he was granted the fiefs of Bratsberg and Gimsø kloster in Norway. He was the owner of Sonnerupgaard at Roskilde.

On 20 February 1566, he is mentioned as dead but his death may already have occurred when Mogens Pedersen Galt on 8 April 1564 took over his Norwegian fiefs.

Bild was married to Dorthe Christoffersdatter Ravensberg, a daughter of Christoffer Jepsen Ravensberg (died 1543) and Eline Sigvardsdatter Grubbe (died 1547 or later).
