= Severin de Junge =

Danish judge (1680-1757)

Severin de Junge (28 November 1680 – 14 October 1757) was a Danish government official, Supreme Court justice and director of the Danish West India Company. During his time this was Denmark–Norway. On 6 April 1731, he was ennobled under the name de Junge. He owned Sonnerupgaard and Skullerupgård but economic difficulties forced him to sell both estates in the second half of the 1740s.

== Early life and education ==
Junge was the son of War Commissioner and kammerråd Emanuel de June (1644–1692) and Bodil Sørensdatter Hiort (c. 1650–1724). He was appointed hofjunker in 1701 and the following year studied at Oxford University.

== Career ==
Junge was in 1710 appointed as staff secretary of the later general and in 1720 elected for the important post as deputy of the Army's General Commission (deputeret i landetatens general kommissariat). He served as Supreme Court justice in 1715–35 and was an extraordinary member of the Supreme Court Commission in 1731–34, He was in 1723 elected as principal participant (hovedparticipant) of the Danish West India Company and in 1727 as the company's managing director.

== Property and ennoblement ==
Junge inherited the manor of Sonnerupgaard after his mother and bought Skullerupholm in 1711. He was on 6 April 1731 raised to the peerage under the name de Junge.

== Personal life ==
June married twice. His first wife was Catharine Wissing (1693–1724), a daughter of kancelliråd Jens W. (c. 1656–97) and Elisabet Meulengracht (1659–94). They married on 24 May 1714 in the Church of Our Lady in Copenhagen. His second wife was Else Bartholin (26 May 1701 – 22 April 1757), a daughter of professor Hans B. (1665–1738) and Anna Maria Reitzer (1668–1733). They married on 30 May 1727 in the Church of Our Lady in Copenhagen.

Junge ran into economic difficulties and had to sell his estates in the second half of the 1740s. He died on 14 October 1757 and was buried in the Church of Our lady in Copenhagen.
