= Skullerupholm =

Manor house in Lejre, Denmark

Coordinates: 55°37′04″N 11°54′18″E

Skullerupholm is a manor house and estate located in Lejre Municipality, Denmark.

== History ==
The estate traces its history back to the 14th century with Anders Pedersen Uldsaks as its first recorded owner in 1326. It was later passed to his brother Sakse Pedersen Uldsaks. In 1355, Sakse Yldsaks' daughter Ingebrog inhirited a stake in the estate. Ownership was subsequently spread out among several owners for the next many years.

FrIn 1457-1461, Roskilde bishopric acquired all the stakes in the estate. It was subsequently managed as a fief.

After the Reformation, Skullerup was confiscated by the Crown. It was then operated as a royal fief. From 1554 to 1594. After the introduction of Absolute monarchy in 1660, Skullerupholm was ceded to the magistrate in Copenhagen.

In 1663m it was acquired by Johannes Fincke. It was later ceded to his father-in-law, Henrik Müller, one of the largest landowners in the country. In 1673, it was incorporated in Skjoldenæsholm birk.

In 1688, Müller ceded Skullerupgaard to his daughter Sophie Müller and her husband Johannes Fincke. In 1707, Sophie Müller sold the estate to Severin de Junge,

=== 1748–present: Holstein-Ledreborg family ===
Skullerupholm was in 1748 acquired by Johan Johan Ludvig Holstein and incorporated into the County of Ledreborg.

The County of Ledreborg was in 1926 dissolved as a result of the lensafløsningsloven of 1919. The Holstein-Ledreborg family kept Skullerupholm but land for 10 new smallholds were sold off.

== List of owners ==
- (1326-1337) Anders Pedersen Uldsaks
- (1326-1355) Sakse Pedersen Uldsaks
- (1355- ) Ingeborg Saksesdatter Uldsaks, gift Grubbe
- ( -1378) Peder Jensen Grubbe
- (1378-1397) Ingeborg Saksesdatter Uldsaks
- (1378- ) Ingeborg Pedersdatter Grubbe, gift Bjørn
- ( -1416) Johan Olufsen Bjørn
- (1416-1448) Sten Basse
- (1448-1451) Eline Johansdatter Bjørn, gift Basse
- (1448-1461) Torben Bille
- (1451-1461) Oluf AxelsenThott
- (1454-1457) Johan Bjørnsen
- (1454-1457) Gørvel Andersdatter Lunge
- (1457-1536) Roskilde bispestol
- (1536-1661) Kronen
- (1661-1664) Københavns Magistrat
- (1664- ) Johannes Fincke
- ( -1688) Henrik Müller
- (1688-1707) Johannes Fincke
- (1707-1711) Sophie Müller, gift Fincke
- (1711- ) Severin de Junge
- ( -1748) Emanuel de Junge
- ( -1748) Jens de Junge
- ( -1748) Ane Bolette de Junge
- ( -1748) Mariane Catharina Junge
- (1748-1763) Johan Ludvig Holstein
- (1763-1699) Christian Frederik Holstein
- (1699-1853) Christian Edzard Holstein-Ledreborg
- (1853-1895) Christian Edzard Moritz Holstein-Ledreborg
- (1895-1912) Johan Ludvig Carl Christian Tido Holstein-Ledreborg
- (1912-1951) Josef Ignatius Maria Holstein-Ledreborg
- (1951-1989) Knud Johan Ludvig Holstein-Le
- (1989- ) Silvia Charlotte Marie Holstein-Ledreborg, gift Munro
