= Frederikke Dannemand =

Mistress of Danish royalty (1792–1862)

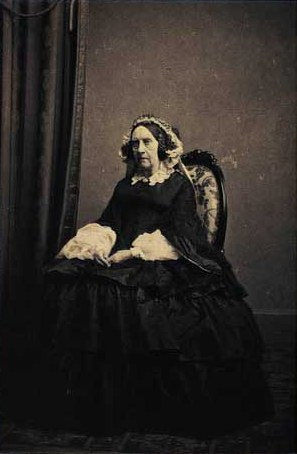
Frederikke Dannemand in 1862.

Frederikke Benedichte Dannemand, born as Bente Frederikke Mortensdatter Andersen Rafsted (6 August 1792 – 23 December 1862) is known in history as the royal mistress of King Frederick VI of Denmark.

== Biography ==
She became the mistress of Frederick when she was fifteen or sixteen, which means it would have been in 1805 or 1806. In 1808, she was installed at Toldbodvej No. 289 under the name ”Fru Dannemand” (Mrs Dannemand"), where he visited her daily. They had several children, who were ennobled or married to nobles. In 1814, she was told that the king had been unfaithful during his absence in Vienna, and when he returned in 1815, he found her gone and pregnant. The fatherhood of her next child was never established.

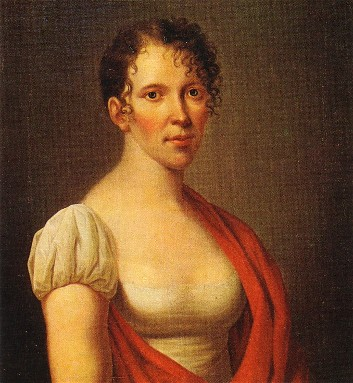
Frederikke Dannemand by Hans Hansen.

In 1818, the relationship with Frederick was restored and she was back at Toldbodgade, and in 1819, she had another child. In 1829, she was given the rank and title normally held by the spouse of a colonel, despite the fact that she was not married to one. The same year, her children with the king were ennobled. When King Frederick died in 1839, she was brought to his lit-de-parade at the royal palace to mourn by his corpse alongside his widow, the queen dowager.

Dannemand died in Copenhagen on 23 December 1862. She was given a military funeral in recognition of the colonel-rank given to her by the monarch.

== Legends ==
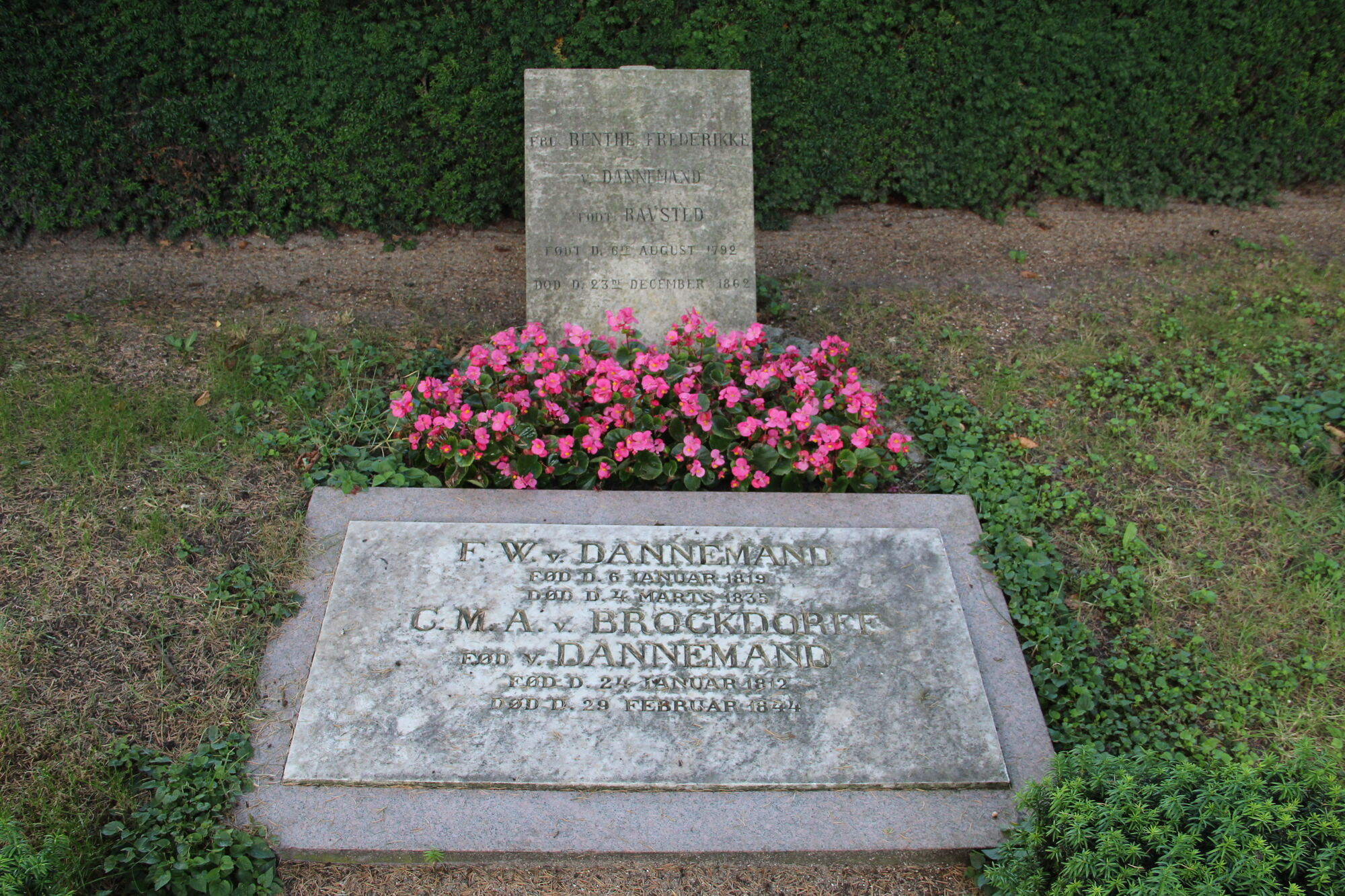
Dannemand's tombstone in Copenhagen's Garrison Cemetery.

In one story, she came to the royal palace to beg the regent personally to spare the life of her father, who had been arrested for theft. Johan Bülow suggested that the regent took her as a "stand-in" for his consort, who was exhausted after all her childbirths. She became the mistress of the king in 1805 or 1806, and her father's life was spared.

== Children ==
Dannemand had five children, of which 4 were acknowledged descendants of Frederik VI.

- Louise Frederikke (1810–1888)
- Karoline Augusta (1812–1844)
- Frederik Vilhelm Dannemand (1813–1888)
- Vilhelm Christian Andersen (1816–?)
- Frederik Valdemar Dannemand (1819–1835)
