= Sonnerupgaard =

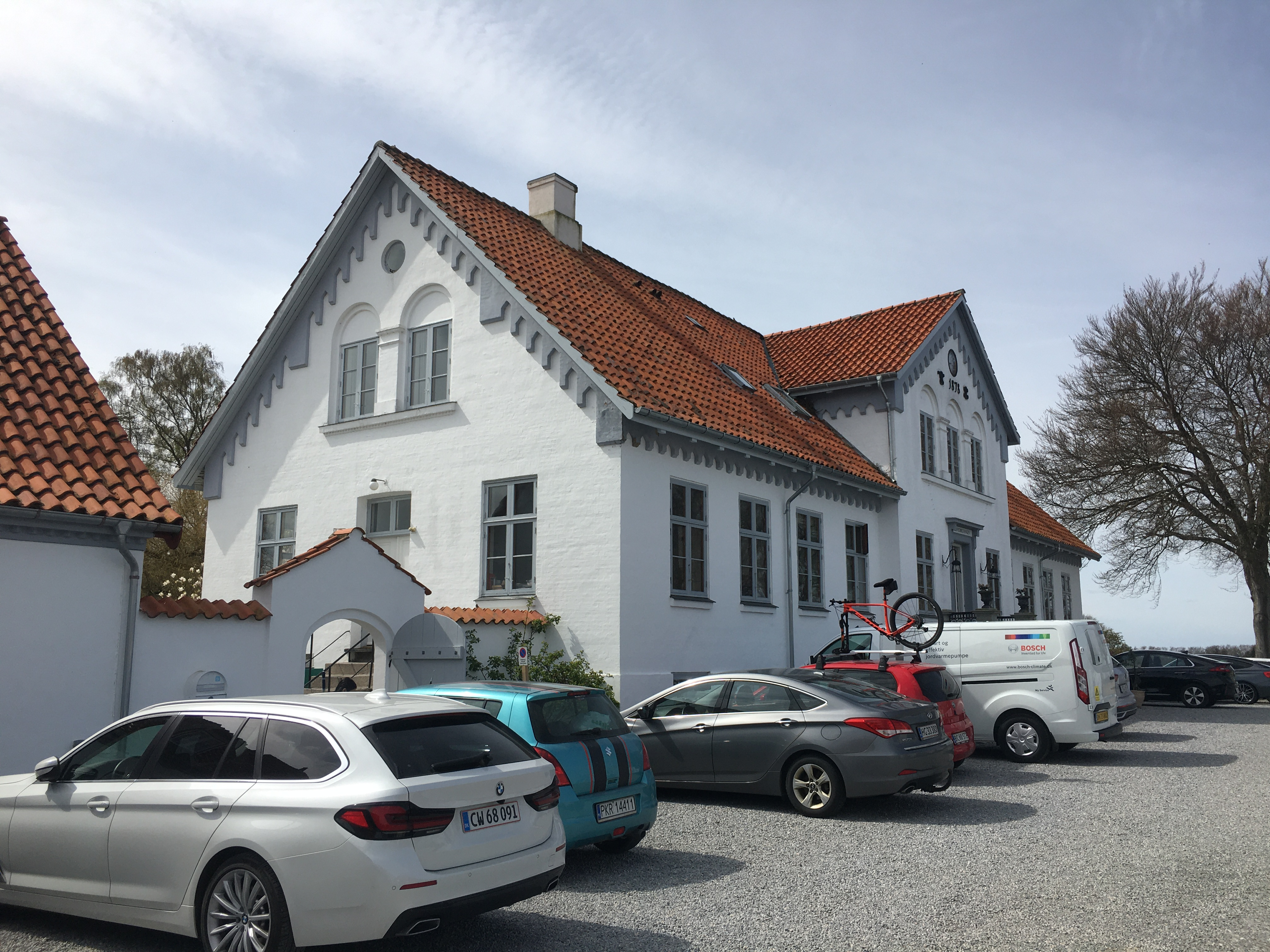
- The main building of Sonnerupgaard
- Interactive map of the Sonnerupgaard area

General information
- Location: Tølløsevej 55; 4330 Hvalsø, Denmark
- Coordinates: 55°36′0″N 11°50′24″E
- Completed: 1879

Sonnerupgaard is a manor house and estate in Lejre Municipality, Denmark. Today, it is operated as a hotel and event centre.

The property was first recorded in 1341 and its ownership has since passed through several noble families, including the Bille and Trolle families. From the 18th to the 20th century, the property was owned by successive members of the Zeuthen family. In 1923, it was sold to a consortium before returning to private ownership in 1928. In the 1960s, the property was converted into an educational centre. Since the 1990s, it has operated as a hotel and event centre.

== History ==
=== Early history ===
The name Sonnerupgaard is first recorded in 1341 when it was owned by Niels Pedersen. It was later passed down to his son and grand daughter.

Peder Bild acquired the estate in the middle of the 16th century. After his death in 1566, Sonnerupgaard was passed on to Christoffer Bild. The estate was later in the century owned by Jakob Trolle and then by his widow Mette Jakobsdatter Høg Banner.

By 1621, Sonnerupgaard had been acquired by Manderup Parsberg. He was one of the great landowners of his time and had acquired much of his property through his marriages. His widow Anne Brahe kept the estate after his death in 1625. After her death in 1633, Sonnerupgaard was endowed to her brother Otte Brahe who sold it to Jørgen Urne later that same year. Irne and his wife were also the owners of Alslev, Nær and Knudseje.

After Jørgen Urne's death in 1642, Sonneruypgaard was passed on to his son Knud Urne. He sold the estate to Bertel Bartholin in 1661. The new owner was a son of the physician and theologian Casper Bartholin. Johannes Fincke acquired the estate in1675. Later that same year he sold it to his brother-in-law Rasmus Poulsen Vinding. He was the principal writer of Christian V's Danish Code.

After Rasmus Poulsen Vindin'g death in 1684, Sonnerupgaard was sold by his heirs to Bodil Sørensdatter Hiort. She later ceded the estate to her son Severin Junge. In 1731, he was raised to the peerage under the name de Junge. He owned a number of estates but sold Sonnerupgaard in i 1745.

The new owner was Adolf Andreas von der Lühe. Just a few years later he sold the estate to Frederik Brabrand. He was a strong advocate for agricultural reforms and wrote several articles on the subject. Johan Thomas Neergaard, the largest landowner on central Zealand, acquired the estate in 1788. He was also the owner of Ringsted Abbey, Merløsegaard, Søgaard and Tølløse.

=== The Zeuthen family ===
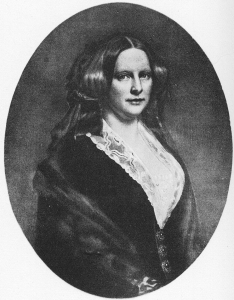
Comtesse, Sophie Hedevig Zeuten, néeSchulin

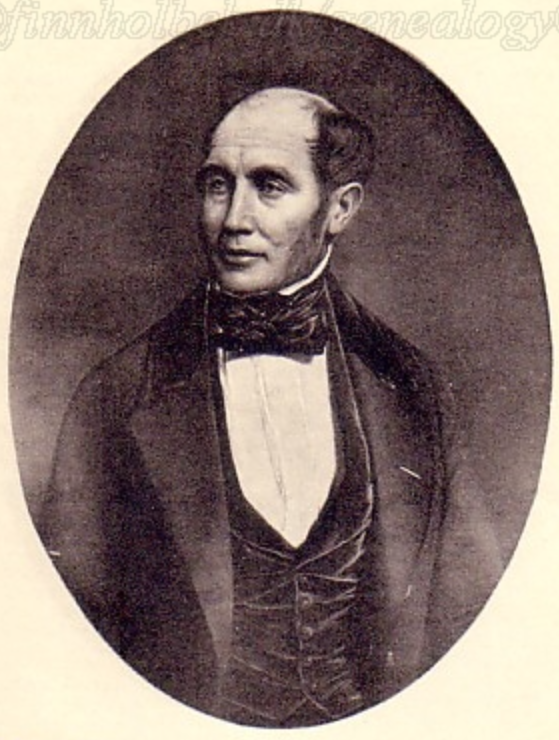
Christian Frederik Zeuthen.

Sonnerupgaard, Søgaard and Tølløse was later acquired by Peder Christian Zeuthen. He was a member of the Royal Danish Agricultural Society from 1788. Peder Christian Zeuthen os omcæuded in Frederik Thaarup's "Fædrelandske Nekrologer" with biographies of notable men.

Peder Christian Zeuthen died in 1823. His son Christian Frederik Zeuthen bought out the other heirs in 1828. He created the Barony of Zeuthen from his three estates in1843. Christian Frederik Zeuthen was a co-founder of Kreditkassen til Selvejendoms Fremme and was an elected member of the stænderforsamlingen in 1840 and 1847. He was an active member of a circle of landowners who opposed the adoption of the Danish Constitution in 1849.

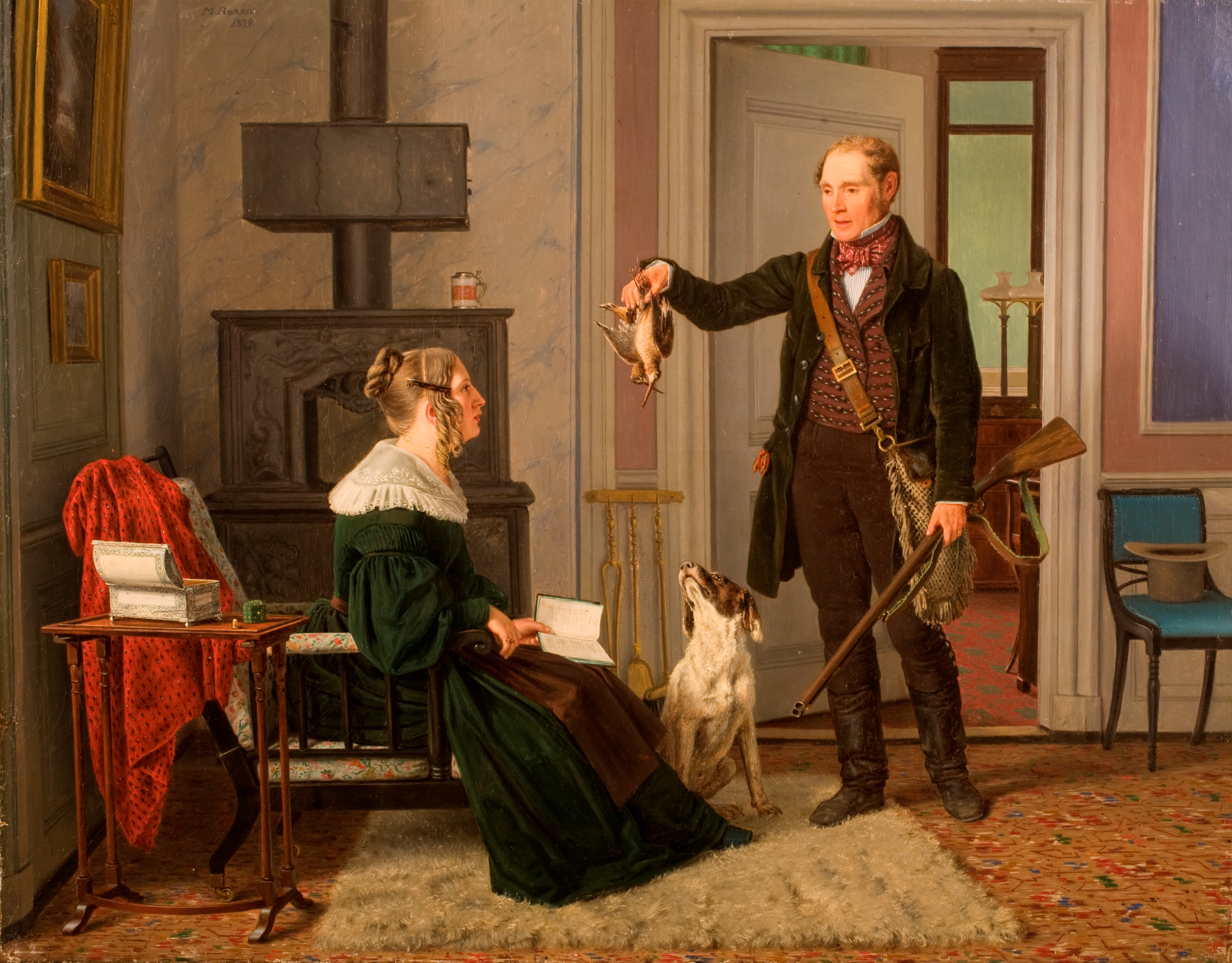
Martinus Rørbye: A Hunter Shows His Wife the Result of the First Snipe Gunt. Portrait of Christian Fr. Zeuthen and his wife Sophie Hedevig, 1839, The Hirschsprung Collection.

Christian Frederik Zeuthen died in 1850 and his widow Sophie Hedvig Schulin then kept the estate until her death in 1866. The barony was then passed to her brother Christian Frederik Schulin who the following year took the name Schulin-Zeuthen. His son constructed a new main building and home farm towards the end of the century.

Christian Julius William Schulin-Zeuthen died without children in 1919. The barony was therefore passed on to his nephew William Christopher Sigismund Schulin-Zeuthen.

=== Later history ===
The barony was dissolved in 1921 as a result of the Lensafløsningsloven of 1919. Sonnerupgaard was shortly thereafter sold to a consortium to be able to pay the associated taxes.

The consortium sold Sonnerupgaard to N. G. Breit in 1928. In 1954 it was sold to H. F. M. Hollesen. He died in 1959. Sonnerypgaard was then acquired by an insurance company and converted into an educational centre in 1963.

The estate was acquired by Birgitte Israelsen Knudsen and Peter Kjær Knudsen in 1996. The main building is operated as a hotel and event venue.

== List of owners ==
- Niels Pedersen, 1341–?
- Anders Pedersen Panter, 1374–1408
- Peder Tuesen Rani, 1408–?
- Mette Andersdatter Rani née Panter, ?–1455
- Otto Cernin, 1446–?
- Torben Bille, ?–1492
- Peder Bille, 1492–1508
- Peder Bild, ?–1566
- Christoffer Bild, 1566–?
- Jakob Trolle, ?–1601
- Mette Jakobsdatter Høg Trolle née Banner, 1601–?
- Manderup Parsberg, 1621–1625
- Anne Parsberg née Brahe, 1625–1633
- Otto Brahe, 1633
- Jørgen Knudsen Urne, 1633–1642
- Knud Urne, 1642–1661
- Bertil Bartholin, 1661–1675
- Johannes Fincke, 1675
- Rasmus Vinding, 1675–1684
- Heirs of Rasmus Vinding, 1684–1695
- Bodil Sørensdatter Klothak née Hiort, 1695–?
- Hieronymus Klothack, ?
- Severin de Junge, ?–1745
- Adolf Andreas von der Lühe, 1745–1749
- Frederik Brabrand, 1749–1788
- Johan Thomas Neergaard, 1788–1793
- Peter Christian Zeuthen, 1793–1823
- Heirs of Peter Christian Zeuten, 1823–1828
- Christian Frederik Zeuthen, 1828–1850
- Sophie Hedvig Zeuthen née Schulin, 1850–1866
- Christian Frederik Schulin-Zeuthen, 1866–1873
- Christian Julius William Schulin-Zeuthen, 1873–1919
- William Christopher Sigismund Schulin-Zeuthen, 1919–1923
- Konsortium, 1923–1928
- N.C. Breit, 1928–1954
- H.F.M. Hollesen, 1954–1959
- Den almindelige Brandforsikring for Landbygninger, København, 1959–1985
- Anne Dorph, 1985–1996
- Preben Herbo, 1985–1996
- Birgitte Israelsen Knudsen and Peter Kjær Knudsen, 1996–present
