= Lensgreve (Danish title) =

Danish noble title

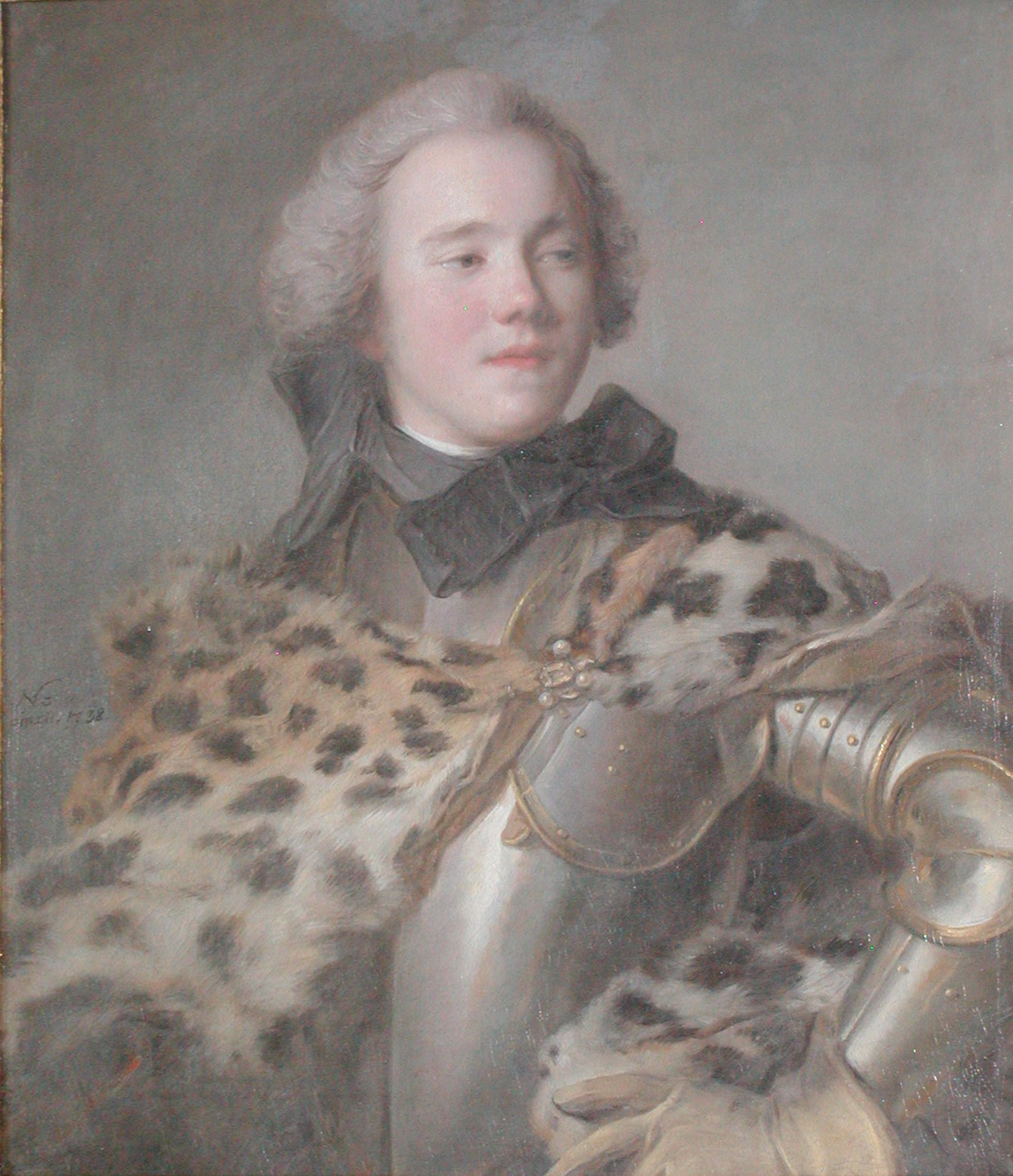
Jørgen Lensgreve Scheel

Lensgreve is the name of the highest noble rank in Denmark. The title has existed since the introduction of the comital and baronial privileges of 1671 and remains in use today. Within the noble order of the Kingdom of Denmark, the Lensgrever occupy an especially elevated position and stand at the head of the aristocratic hierarchy, and are therefore counted among the high nobility. Their rank within the Danish nobility is comparable with that of dukes in other European countries.

== Meaning and Standing ==
The title Lensgreve originally referred to counts who held a Grevskab, a county established as a royal fief. Until the abolition of the fiefs through the Lensafløsning of 1919, these feudal counties consisted of large landed-property complexes, known as majorates, which the king had elevated into fiefs with special privileges and a restricted order of inheritance. The title was inherited undivided according to the right of primogeniture, unlike ordinary comital titles, which could be borne by several branches of a noble house. The Lensgreve was therefore regarded as the head of the house.

Danish Noble Ranking
Lensgreve	Royal Fief Count
Greve	Count
Lensbaron	Royal Fief Baron
Baron / Friherre	Baron
Ridder	Knight
Væbner	Squire
ubetitlet adel	untitled Nobility

== History ==
In the centuries before 1660, the power of the Danish high nobility rested largely on the elective monarchy. At each royal election, the leading noble families, especially when negotiating with foreign candidates for the throne, were able to secure new concessions. In this way, part of the political power of the realm gradually shifted from the king to the Council of the Realm and the great noble houses. Among other things, the nobility obtained influence over the appointment of high offices, including positions in the highest civil administration, the office of Admiral of the Realm, and the governorship of Norway.

After the Dano-Swedish War of 1657-1658, King Frederick III succeeded in transforming Denmark from an elective monarchy into a hereditary monarchy. With the introduction of absolutism, the king became the sovereign hereditary ruler of the realm, and the nobility's direct political participation in government largely came to an end. The ancient nobility continued to exist as a social estate, but its former political role was replaced by a new order of rank and titles created by the Crown. Alongside the ancient nobility, a “younger nobility” emerged through the ennoblement of bourgeois families.

After Christian V’s accession to the throne in 1670, work began on the creation of a new aristocracy of rank and title. On 25 May 1671, Christian V signed three central ordinances that established the framework of the absolutist order: the Chamber Ordinance, which regulated access to the king; the Order of Rank, which defined the new social hierarchy; and the Privileges of Counts and Barons, which provided the legal foundation for the Danish fiefs. The first privileges were laid down in 1671 and revised in 1674, while later regulations, especially those of 1688, further specified the system.

The creation of feudal counties and feudal baronies depended on royal favor and required a nobleman to consolidate his properties into a single fief. A feudal county was expected to comprise at least 2,500 barrels of hard grain with a fortune of 120,000 rigsdaler, while a feudal barony required about 1,000 barrels of hard grain with 50,000 rigsdaler. The applicant submitted a land register together with a description of the intended order of succession, which usually followed the principle of primogeniture in the agnatic line. On this basis the king issued a letter of fief establishment and a patent — an official document drawn up on parchment in Danish, accompanied by a description of the coat of arms and the land register.

Once such a fief had been created, the estate no longer functioned as ordinary private property. Instead, it became a body of property bound by public law. The founder and his descendants possessed only a restricted right of disposal: the fief had to be preserved as an undivided estate and could neither be freely divided nor arbitrarily encumbered. If the line entitled to inherit died out, the fief reverted to the Crown unless a special right of reversion existed. The order of succession often followed the principles of the Royal Law of 1665. The holder of the fief enjoyed wide-ranging privileges but, at the same time, stood under state supervision and functioned, in a certain sense, as a royal office-holder.

The feudal counties and baronies served a clear political purpose. The absolute monarchy sought to bind the aristocracy more closely to the Crown by encouraging the nobility to exchange unrestricted private ownership for hereditarily bound fiefs. Many members of the ancient nobility regarded this system as an infringement of property rights, while others were attracted by its social, political, and economic advantages. Succession proceeded undivided according to primogeniture; younger sons often bore lower titles such as greve or friherre, but with sufficient landed property and royal approval they could establish the basis for a separate fief-comital or fief-baronial line.

== First fief-holders ==
At the introduction of the privileges in 1671, six counts — Schack, Aldenburg, Rantzau, Friis, Rantzow, and Parsberg — one baroness — Trolle — and five barons — Winterfeldt, Rüsen, Rheede, Rosenkrantz, and Holck — were appointed or naturalized. The first fief letter was granted on 29 September 1671 to King Christian V's half-brother Ulrik Frederik Gyldenløve for the county of Laurvig in Norway, which was described as “the first feudal county of our realm.” In total, between 1671 and 1818, 28 feudal counties (out of 165 majorates) and 32 feudal baronies were established in the Kingdom of Denmark.

Although the majorates formed only part of the Danish landed-estate landscape, their economic importance was considerable. In 1850, they accounted for about 25 percent of Denmark's total area and more than half of the land subject to hereditary entail.

With the Danish Constitution of 1849, all noble privileges were abolished. The nobility nevertheless continued to exist as a recognized historical, social, and genealogical estate. At the same time, the creation of new fiefs, including new royal feudal counties, was prohibited, and the conversion of existing entailed estates into free property was ordered. After 1849, no new families were elevated to the Danish nobility, although in individual cases foreign nobles were naturalized into the Danish nobility.

The old feudal structure was finally dissolved through the Lensafløsning of 1919. The remaining family fideicommissa, including feudal counties and baronies, were gradually converted into free property. This process involved transfers of land to the state and the establishment of so-called successor funds. The titles attached to the former fiefs, including Lensgreve and Lensbaron, were not simply abolished at once. Instead, they were allowed to continue for the holder at the time of redemption and for a limited number of further successions — in practice, as transitional titles for three generations in total, or two further inheritances.

== Current Lensgrever ==
In the present day, the title of Lensgreve continues to exist, although most surviving examples are now historically transitional rather than attached to an existing fief. As of March 2026, there are 13 living Lensgrever. They can be divided into two categories.

The first category consists of seven Lensgrever who bear the title by virtue of royal patent. Their titles were not affected by the Lensafløsning and may continue as long as the family produces agnatic heirs, that is, male descendants according to the principle of agnatic primogeniture.

The second category consists of six Lensgrever who bear the title because they have received a share in a successor fund. These funds were established after the redemption of the former feudal counties as compensation for the families. The Fief Redemption Act and the royal resolution allowed the title to continue from the holder at the time of the Lensafløsning for two further successions. These titles therefore still exist, but they are expected to disappear gradually as the remaining entitled holders pass.

This first category — Lensgrever by royal patent — is extremely rare and represents only a small part of the Danish feudal-comital tradition.

The gradual extinction of the second category has already been underway for decades. Of the 21 counties redeemed in the 1920s, the title of Lensgreve has already become extinct in 15 cases. The first such extinction occurred in 1959 with Niels Count Krag-Juel-Vind-Frijs, 1910–1959, who held a share in the successor fund of the county of Frijsenborg. In 2017, the author Merete Wilkenschildt wrote in Kongeligt leksikon that “the final successions will take place in the very foreseeable future.” Since then, four more Lensgrever have died: Lensgreve Carl A. P. Holstein-Ledreborg in 2018, Lensgreve Christian A. V. Lerche-Lerchenborg in 2024, Lensgreve Frants Bernstorff-Gyldensteen in 2025, and Lensgreve Preben Ahlefeldt-Laurvig in 2025.

Royally patented lensgrever and their heirs
House	Lensgreve	Age	Titel inherited	Spouse	Heirs
Ahlefeldt	Lensgreve Oscar Dolores Ahlefeldt	83	1943	Asencion Miranda	-
Reventlow I - Main Family	Lensgreve Christian Friedrich Klaus Hermann von Reventlow	67	2010	Ingeborg Theresia Pfab	Greve Nils Christian Hubert Iven von Reventlow
Bernstorff	Lensgreve Ernst Andreas Peter de Bernstorff	84	1946	Anna von dem Bussche-Ippenburg	-
Scheel	Lensgreve Christian Ditlev Scheel	65	1989	Lulle Andreassen	Greve Sebastian Jørgen Scheel
Schulin	Lensgreve Kresten Vilhelm Schulin	74	2000	Charlotte Elisabeth Birkvig	Greve Frederik Vilhelm Schulin
Blücher de Altona	Lensgreve Conrad Andrew Blücher de Altona	62	1976	Amanda Jane Hopkins	Greve James Gustav Blücher af Altona
Wedel-Jarlsberg	Lensgreve Carl Nicolaus Wedel-Jarlsberg	52	1999	Caroline Margareta Mølle	Greve Christian Caspar Wedel-Jarlsberg

Fief-tied lensgrever*
House	Lensgreve	Age	Titel inherited	Spouse	Fief
Schimmelmann	Lensgreve Carl-Gustav Schimmelmann	55	2005	Katrine Boel-Petersen	Lindenborg
Reventlow II - Branch Family	Lensgreve Christian Ditlev Ludvig Reventlow	75	1984	Anni Gregersen	Christianssæde
Wedell	Lensgreve Bendt Tido Hannibal Wedell	50	1982	Pernille Rosalia Korsbek Poulsen	Wedellsborg
Knuth	Lensgreve Adam Christoffer Knuth	52	2013	Stephanie Annette Mikkelsen	Knuthenborg
Schaffalitzky de Muckadell	Lensgreve Erik Engelke Schaffalitzky de Muckadell	74	2011	Ingelise Nissen	Muckadell
Bille-Brahe-Selby	Lensgreve Stig Daniel Bille-Brahe-Selby	73	2000	Anne Rosendahl Sørensen	Brahesminde

*All Lensgreve titles tied to former fiefs are now in their final permitted stage of succession. Accordingly, the theoretical heirs of the listed Lensgrever will not succeed to the title of Lensgreve, but will remain Grever.

Thus, the Lensgrever are not merely a historical institution. The feudal counties themselves no longer exist as legal fiefs, and the privileges once attached to them have been abolished, but the title Lensgreve survives within the Danish nobility. It exists today both as a limited transitional title connected to the former successor funds and, more permanently, in the rare lines that hold the dignity by royal patent.

Content in this edit is translated from the existing Danish Wikipedia article at da:Lensgreve.
