= Jens Peter Trap =

Danish royal cabinet secretary and topographic writer (1810–1885)

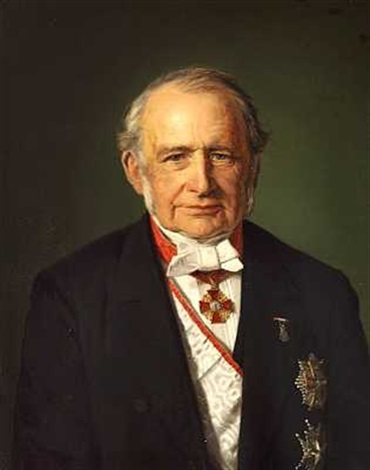
- Trap painted by Otto Bache in 1881
- Born: 19 September 1810; Randers, Denmark
- Died: 16 March 1856 (aged 45); Copenhagen, Denmark
- Occupations: Royal cabinet secretary, publisher and writer
- Awards: Grand cross of the Dannebrog, 1849

Jens Peter Trap (19 September 1810 - 21 January 1885) was a Danish royal cabinet secretary and topographic writer. He is above all remembered for his publication of the monumental work Trap Danmark.

== Early life and education ==
Trap was born in Randers, the son of merchant Niels Trap (1785–1830) and Karen Margrethe Caspersen (1788–1868). He graduated from Randers Grammar School in 1829 and then moved to Copenhagen where he studied law at the University of Copenhagen. After obtaining his degree in 1832, he continued with studies of cameral science.

== Career ==
Trap began his career in the royal cabinet secretariat in 1834. Over the following years he was promoted through the ranks. Trap had hoped to succeed Frederik Ferdinand Tillisch as royal secretary but was passed over in favour of C. Liebenberg, Countess Danner's personal legal advisor, when Tillisch was appointed as new Minister of Interior Affairs in the Cabinet of Ørsted in April 1854, Trap was installed as acting royal secretary when Liebenberg had to resign in 1756 and was permanently appointed in 1967. Over the past 25 years, Trap had at this point served under seven royal cabinet secretaries. He remained in the job until his retirement February 1884.

Trap's work resulted in a lot of travel activity, In 1840, he escorted Christian VIII and Caroline Amalie on their three months journey around the country. Under Frederick VII the excursions became more frequent. The king was interested in archeology and participated in a number of excavations. Trap was present at Frederiksborg Castle on 17 December 1850, when it was destroyed by fire. He was involved in the rescue of around 300 paintings and other historic artifacts. He was also involved in the efforts to rebuilding the castle. Trap was also present at Glücksborg Castle when the king died on 15 November 1863.

== Other occupations ==
Trap was a co-founder and the first president of Foreningen til blindes selvvirksomhed om 1862. He became a board member of the Royal Institute for the Blind in 1865 and also served as director of the Royal Institute for the Deaf-Mute. He also visited similar institutions in Germany, Austria, Italy and Switzerland in search of inspiration.

He was a co-founder of the Royal Danish Geographical Society in 1876 and for many years served as its vice president.

== Publications ==
In 1842 Trap was granted the right to publish the so-called court calendar (hof- og statskalenderen). He also published a German edition in the years 1853–63.

In 1856, Trap and printmaker A. Bull acquired Em. Bærentzen & Co. His publications included Danske Mindesmærker, Danmark fremstillet i Billeder and Danmark i Billeder for Land og Sø. In 1874, Trap became the sole owner of the publishing house. He ceded it to his son Frederik Trap who that same year merged it with Hoffensberg & Trap.

Trap's work with the court calendar inspired him to create a modern version of Erik Pontoppidan's Danske Atlas. The first edition of Trap Danmark was published as Statistisk topographisk Beskrivelse af Kongeriget Danmark in give volumes 1858–60. It was followed by Statistisk-topographisk Beskrivelse af Hertugdømmet Slesvig in two volumes in 1861–64.A new edition in six volumes was published in 1872–79.

== Personal life ==
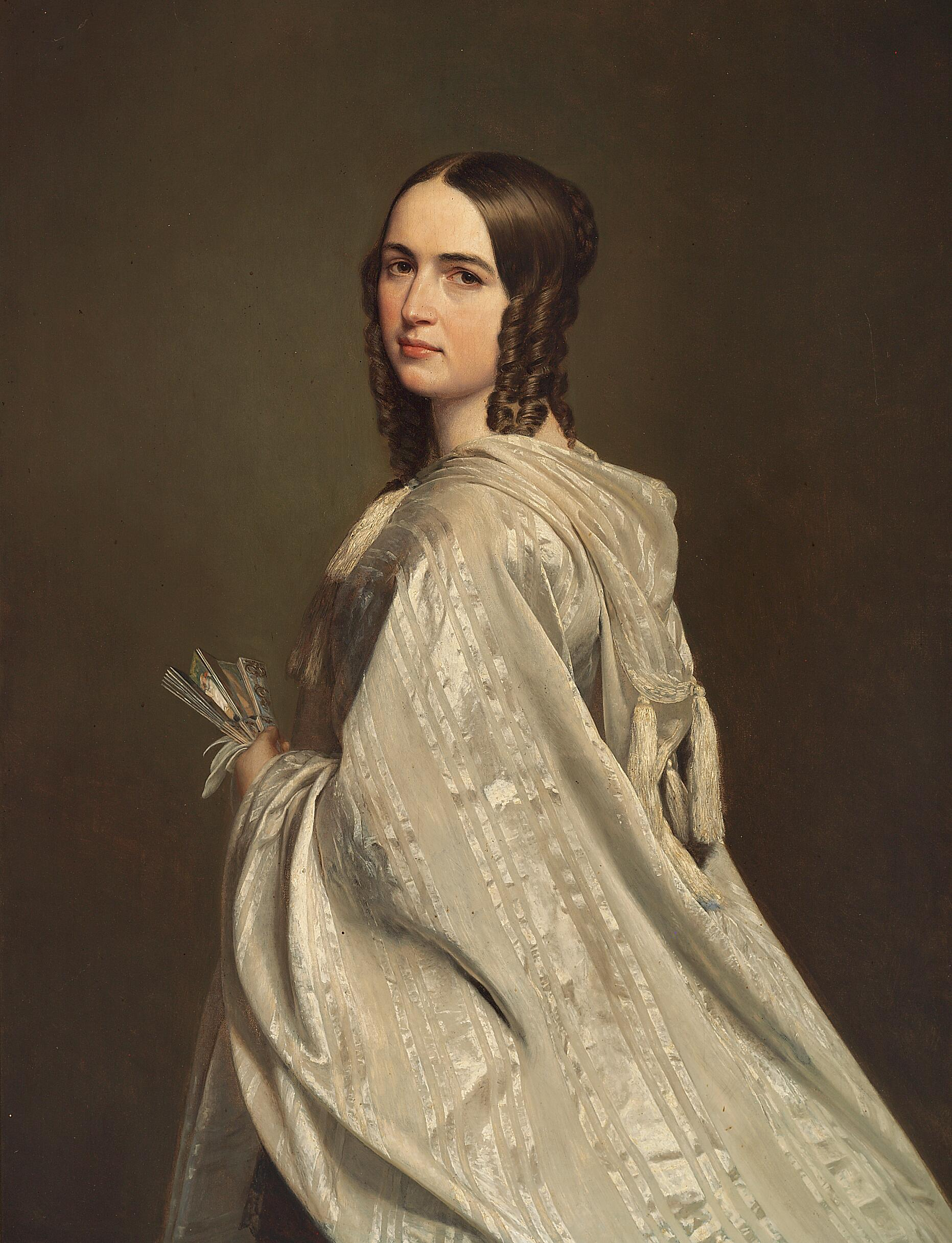
Malvina Hoskier painted by J. V. Gertner

Trap married Christiane Marie Feddersen (1 May 1820 - 7 March 1849), a daughter of former royal cabinet secretary Josias Feddersen (1787–1841) and Viveke Birgitte Krey (1794–1867), on 14 October 1841 in Frederiksberg.

Following the death of his first wife in March 1849 he married Malvine Louise Hoskier (24 January 1826 - 28 October 1906) on 2 May 1850 who was a daughter of broker Frederik Hoskier (1790–1867) and Marie Christiane Hennine Lund (1800–1886).
