= Princess Augusta of Hesse-Kassel (1823–1889) =

Augusta of Hesse-Kassel
- Baroness Blixen
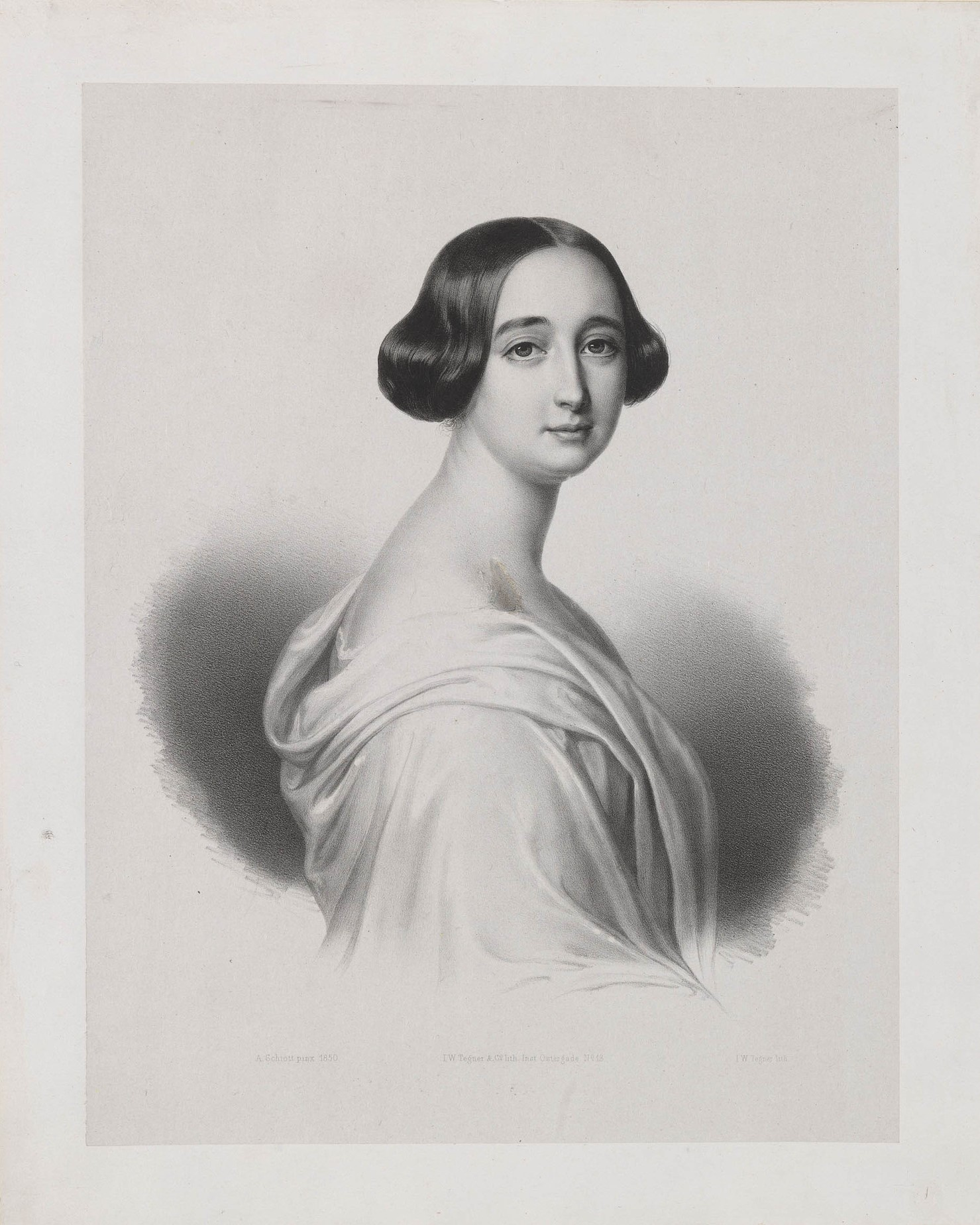
- Born: 30 October 1823; Copenhagen, Denmark
- Died: 17 July 1889 (aged 66); Amalienborg Palace, Copenhagen, Denmark
- Spouse: Carl Frederik Blixen-Finecke (m. 1854; died 1873)
- Issue: Wilhelm Carl Ferdinand Christian von Blixen-Finecke; Wilhelm Carl Anna Otto Gunnar Axel von Blixen-Finecke
- House: Hesse-Kassel
- Father: Prince William of Hesse-Kassel
- Mother: Princess Charlotte of Denmark

Auguste Sophie Friederike Marie Caroline Julie of Hesse-Kassel (30 October 1823 – 17 July 1889), known as Princess Augusta, was a Princess of Hesse-Kassel, a daughter of Prince William of Hesse-Kassel (1787–1867) and Princess Charlotte of Denmark (1789–1864). She spent most of her life in Denmark.

== Family ==
Princess Augusta was born on 30 October 1823 in Copenhagen as the youngest child of Prince William of Hesse, a son of Prince Frederick of Hesse-Kassel and Princess Caroline of Nassau-Usingen and Princess Charlotte of Denmark, a daughter of Hereditary Prince Frederick of Denmark and Norway (1753–1805) and Duchess Sophia Frederica of Mecklenburg-Schwerin (1758–1794). She was thus a niece of king Christian VIII of Denmark. Her sister was Louise of Hesse-Kassel, later Queen of Denmark and mother to King Frederick VIII of Denmark, Queen Alexandra of The United Kingdom, King George I of Greece and Empress Maria Feodorovna of Russia.

Her other siblings included her oldest sister Princess Marie Luise Charlotte of Hesse-Kassel and her only brother Prince Frederick William of Hesse-Kassel (1820–1884), Head of the House of Hesse-Kassel after the death of the last elector of Hesse-Kassel, Frederick William, Elector of Hesse, who died without any legitimate issue.

Augusta's father, Prince William, who was a minor prince of Hesse-Kassel, had moved to Denmark prior to his marriage to Princess Charlotte and Augusta and her siblings grew up in the Danish royal court and the family became one of the leading families in Danish society. The family became even more important when it became clear that the main line of the Danish royal house faced extinction. Augusta and her siblings were among the closest relatives of King Christian VIII and thus they had a strong claim to the throne. Due to various circumstances it was Augusta's brother-in-law, Christian IX of Denmark, who in the end became king when the main line died out in 1863.

== Marriage ==
On 28 May 1854, Princess Augusta married the Danish politician and Danish-Swedish nobleman, Carl Frederik Blixen-Finecke, baron Blixen-Finecke. He held the family seat at Näsbyholm Castle in Sweden and Dallund manor in Funen and served as Danish Minister of Foreign Affairs in 1859–1860. The marriage produced two sons. The marriage was regarded with great distress in Augusta's family because Carl was married with two children when they fell in love and he divorced his wife to marry Augusta. He was furthermore of much lower rank than Augusta and later his political views were far from the views of her family. He also became a close ally of Countess Louise of Danner, the morganatic spouse of King Frederick VII of Denmark, who was disliked by the other members of the Danish royal family. Augusta and Carl had a very happy marriage despite the obstacles and they were known for their hospitality and lavish lifestyle. As a tribute to Augusta, Carl took the motto "Per Angusta ad Augusta," which is Latin for "through difficulties to honors."

== Last years ==
Princess Augusta became a widow on 6 August 1873. She lived for many years in "Villa Augusta" in the town of Elsinore north of Copenhagen. She lived privately at the villa, but she was often visited by the royal family, including emperor Alexander III of Russia, when they stayed at Fredensborg Palace. She died at the Amalienborg Palace in 1889.

== Ancestry ==
Ancestors of Princess Augusta of Hesse-Kassel (1823–1889)

8. Frederick II, Landgrave of Hesse-Cassel
4. Prince Frederick of Hesse-Cassel
9. Princess Mary of Great Britain
2. Prince William of Hesse-Cassel
10. Charles William, Prince of Nassau-Usingen
5. Princess Caroline of Nassau-Usingen
11. Countess Caroline Felizitas of Leiningen-Dagsburg
1. Princess Augusta of Hesse-Kassel
12. Frederick V of Denmark
6. Frederick, Hereditary Prince of Denmark and Norway
13. Duchess Juliana Maria of Brunswick-Wolfenbüttel
3. Princess Louise Charlotte of Denmark
14. Duke Louis of Mecklenburg-Schwerin
7. Duchess Sophia Frederica of Mecklenburg-Schwerin
15. Princess Charlotte Sophie of Saxe-Coburg-Saalfeld
