= Princess Charlotte of Denmark =

Danish princess (1789–1864)

Charlotte of Denmark
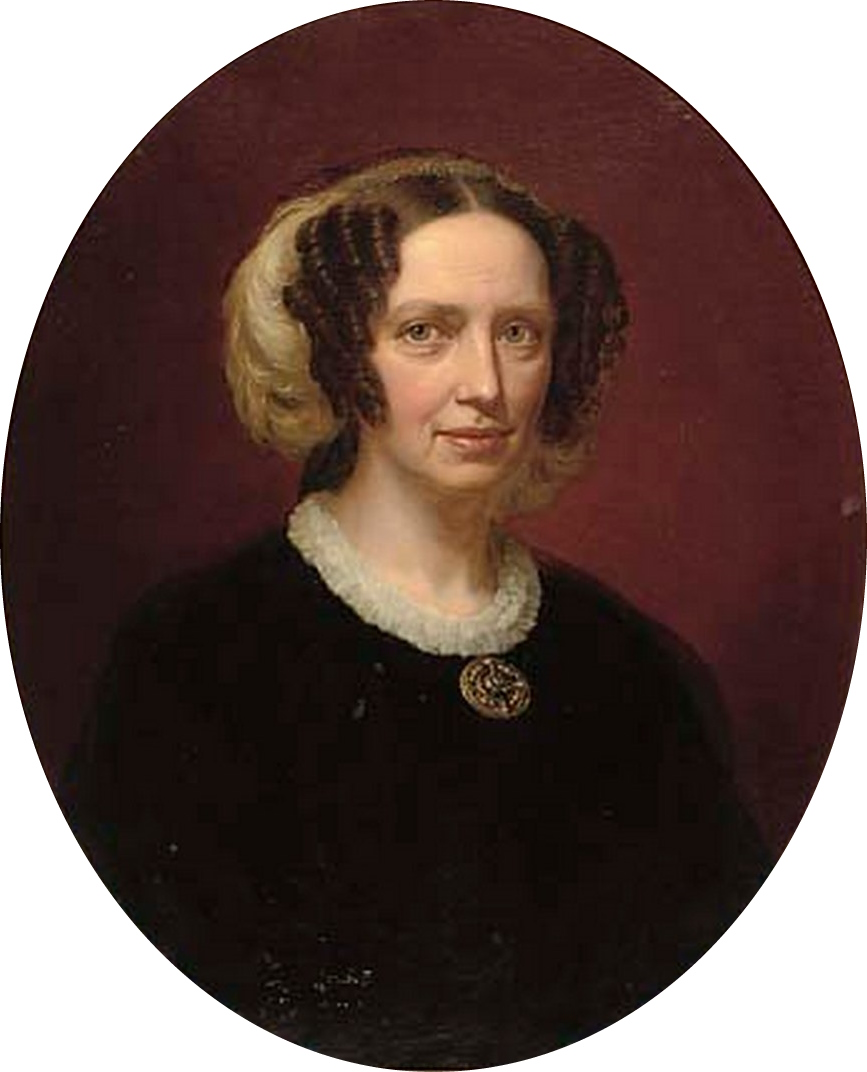
- Portrait by August Schiøtt, c. 1830–39
- Born: 30 October 1789; Christiansborg Palace, Copenhagen
- Died: 28 March 1864 (aged 74); Christiansborg Palace, Copenhagen
- Burial: Roskilde Cathedral
- Spouse: Prince William of Hesse-Kassel (m. 1810)
- Issue: Caroline Frederica; Marie Luise Charlotte, Princess of Anhalt-Dessau; Louise, Queen of Denmark; Frederick, Landgrave of Hesse; Auguste Sophie; Sophie Wilhelmine
- House: Oldenburg
- Father: Frederick, Hereditary Prince of Denmark
- Mother: Sophia Frederica of Mecklenburg-Schwerin

Princess Louise Charlotte of Denmark (Danish: Charlotte af Danmark; 30 October 1789 – 28 March 1864) was a Danish princess, and a princess of Hesse-Kassel by marriage to Prince William of Hesse-Kassel.

Princess Charlotte was a significant figure in her time. She was one of the leading ladies in the country, and when her brother Christian VIII became king in 1839, she was close to the throne. She played an important role in the succession crisis in Denmark in the first half of the 19th century.

== Early life ==
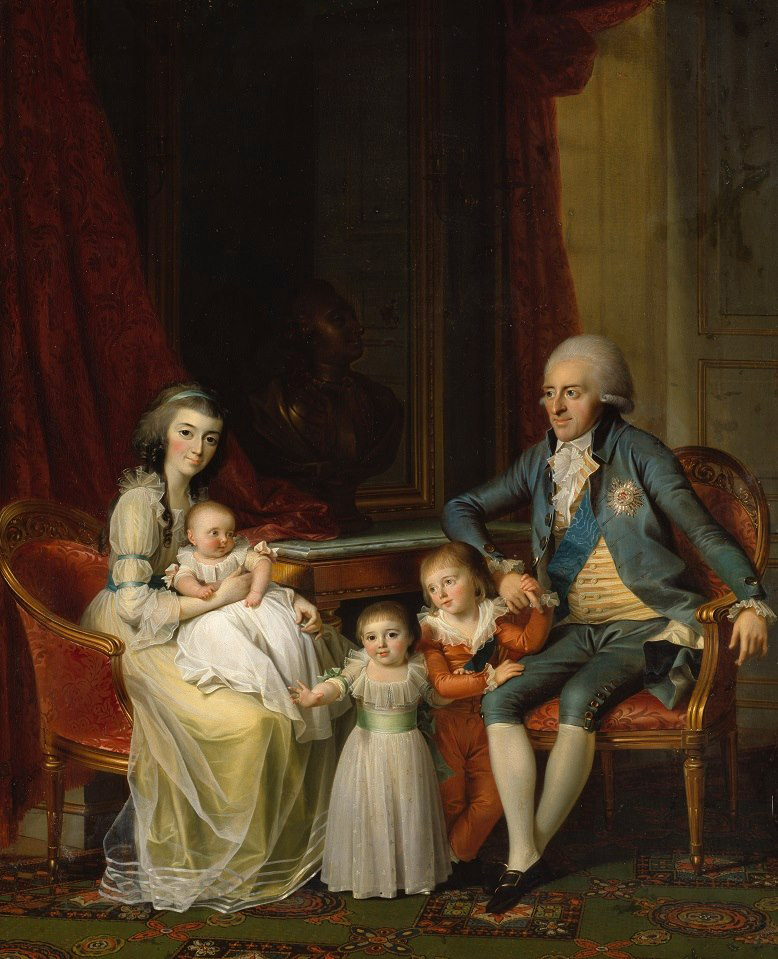
Hereditary Prince Frederick and Hereditary Princess Sophia Frederica with their three eldest children. Princess Charlotte sits on her mother's lap. Portrait by Jens Juel, 1790.

Princess Charlotte was born on 30 October 1789 at Christiansborg Palace, the principal residence of the Danish Monarchy in central Copenhagen. She was the daughter of Frederick, Hereditary Prince of Denmark and Norway, and Duchess Sophia Frederica of Mecklenburg-Schwerin. Her father was a younger son of King Frederick V of Denmark and Norway, while her mother was a daughter of Louis, Hereditary Prince of Mecklenburg-Schwerin. At birth, she had two older siblings, Prince Christian Frederick (who later became King of Norway in 1814 and was King of Denmark as Christian VIII from 1839) and Princess Juliane Sophie. She later had a younger brother, Prince Frederick Ferdinand.

When Princess Charlotte was born, her uncle Christian VII was the monarch of Denmark–Norway. Due to the king's mental illness, however, the real ruler was her cousin, Crown Prince Frederick (later King Frederick VI). Charlotte's family had a strained relationship with Crown Prince Frederick and his family due to the power struggles that the king's mental condition had created, but gradually the relationship between the two branches of the royal family was normalised.

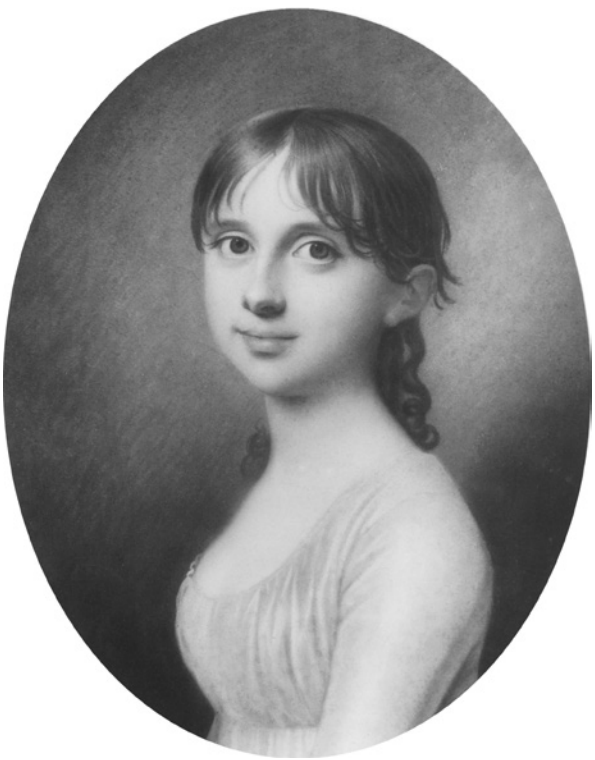
Princess Charlotte. Portrait by Jens Juel, 1802.

Princess Charlotte spent the first years of her life at the large and magnificent baroque palace of Christiansborg. As a summer residence, the family owned Sorgenfri Palace, located on the shores of the small river Mølleåen in Kongens Lyngby, north of Copenhagen.

The year 1794 was an eventful year for the young princess and her family. In February 1794, a fire destroyed Christiansborg Palace, and the family was forced to move to Levetzau's Palace, a rococo palace which forms part of the Amalienborg Palace complex in the district of Frederiksstaden in central Copenhagen. And in November 1794, when Princess Charlotte was five years old, her mother, who was in poor health, died at the age of just 36.

Princess Charlotte was confirmed on 22 May 1803 in the chapel of Frederiksberg Palace along with her brother Prince Christian Frederik and sister Princess Juliane Sophie.

== Marriage ==
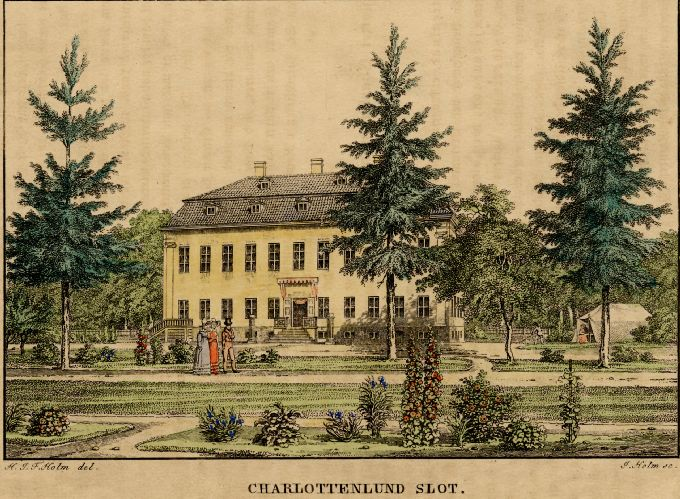
Charlottenlund Palace, c. 1830.

On 10 November 1810, in Amalienborg Palace, she married Prince William of Hesse-Kassel. Her spouse was in Danish service from his youth, and the family lived in Denmark. The couple initially settled on Sankt Annæ Plads in central Copenhagen in what was called the Prince William Mansion. Later, the couple moved into the Brockdorff's Palace at Amalienborg. As their country residence, they received Charlottenlund Palace, located on the shores of the Øresund Strait 10 kilometres north of Copenhagen.

== Later life ==
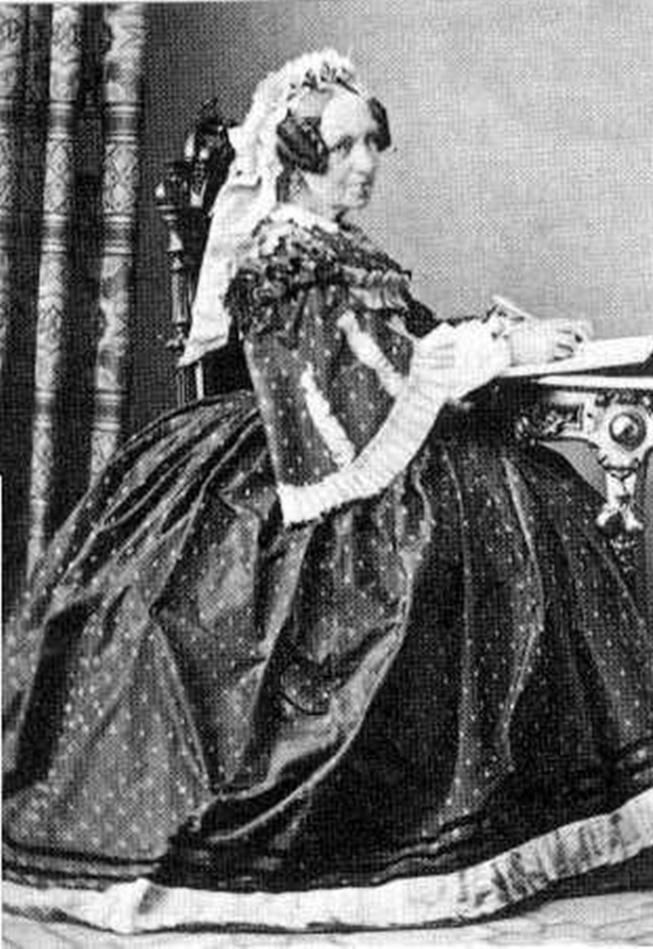
Princess Charlotte of Denmark

Princess Charlotte was described as wise, practical and thrifty, keeping the finances of her household under strict control. She had some interest in art and poetry, and reportedly felt herself to be a Danish patriot. Charlotte played some part in the succession crisis which occurred because her half first cousin, King Frederick VI of Denmark, lacked a male heir. She supported the solution that her branch of the family should succeed to the throne, and because of this, she opposed the Schleswig–Holstein independence movement.

In 1839, her brother Christian VIII of Denmark succeeded their cousin on the throne, and during his reign, Charlotte had an important position at the Danish royal court in Copenhagen because her brother favored that her line of the family should succeed to the throne after his male line had died out.

In 1848, her brother died and was succeeded by his childless son, her nephew, king Frederick VII of Denmark. In 1850, the Danish government was pressured by Russia to choose Prince Christian of Glücksburg, a junior member of the Danish royal family and Charlotte's own son-in-law, as heir to the throne. Prince Christian's older brother the Duke of Schleswig-Holstein-Sonderburg-Glücksburg had displayed anti-Danish sentiment during the recent First Schleswig War, and when gehejmeråd F.C. Dankwart, on behalf of the government, issued the demand that she should renounce her, her son's, and eldest daughter's right to the throne in favor of her second daughter and her husband, she replied: "It is impossible: the Danish people would under no circumstance accept as King a Prince from a house that has made war against Denmark, and that is so hostile toward us". In exchange, she demanded that the House of Oldenburg purchase the Electorate of Hesse and declare it a kingdom, so that her son Frederick could "Switch one Kingdom for another". On 18 July 1851, after having been persuaded that her terms were impossible and that Christian of Glücksburg in fact had good support for his claim, Charlotte agreed to renounce her, her son Frederick's, and her eldest daughter Marie Louise Charlotte's claims to the throne in favour of her second daughter Louise, who in turn renounced her own claim in favor of her spouse, Christian.

Charlotte died in Christiansborg Palace in 1864.

== Issue ==
- Princess Caroline Frederica of Hesse-Kassel (15 August 1811 – 10 May 1829)
- Princess Marie Luise Charlotte of Hesse-Kassel (9 May 1814 – 28 July 1895) married Prince Frederick Augustus of Anhalt-Dessau.
- Princess Louise of Hesse-Kassel (7 September 1817 – 29 September 1898) married Christian IX of Denmark.
- Frederick William, Landgrave of Hesse-Kassel (26 November 1820 – 14 October 1884) married first Grand Duchess Alexandra Nikolaevna of Russia and she died soon after their marriage, and second Princess Anna of Prussia.
- Princess Auguste Sophie of Hesse-Kassel (30 October 1823 – 17 July 1889) married Baron Carl Frederik Blixen-Finecke.
- Princess Sophie Wilhelmine of Hesse-Kassel (18 January – 20 December 1827)

== Ancestry ==
Ancestors of Princess Charlotte of Denmark

8. Christian VI of Denmark
4. Frederick V of Denmark
9. Princess Sophie Magdalene of Brandenburg-Kulmbach
2. Frederick, Hereditary Prince of Denmark
10. Ferdinand Albert II, Duke of Brunswick-Wolfenbüttel
5. Duchess Juliana Maria of Brunswick-Wolfenbüttel
11. Princess Antoinette of Brunswick-Wolfenbüttel
1. Princess Charlotte of Denmark
12. Christian Ludwig II, Duke of Mecklenburg-Schwerin
6. Duke Louis of Mecklenburg-Schwerin
13. Duchess Gustave Caroline of Mecklenburg-Strelitz
3. Duchess Sophia Frederica of Mecklenburg-Schwerin
14. Francis Josias, Duke of Saxe-Coburg-Saalfeld
7. Princess Charlotte Sophie of Saxe-Coburg-Saalfeld
15. Princess Anna Sophie of Schwarzburg-Rudolstadt
