= De Engelske Rækkehuse =

De Engelske Rækkehuse may refer to:

- English Terrace (Toldbodgade) (De Engelske Rækkehuse), a terrace in downtown Copenhagen
- De Engelske Rækkehuse, a housing development in Charlottenlund, Copenhagen
- De Engelske Eækkehuse, a housing development in Kongens Lyngby, Copenhagen
