= Jan von Osten House =

Building in Copenhagen, Denmark

Coordinates: 55.6862°N 12.5953°E

- Jan von Ostens Gård
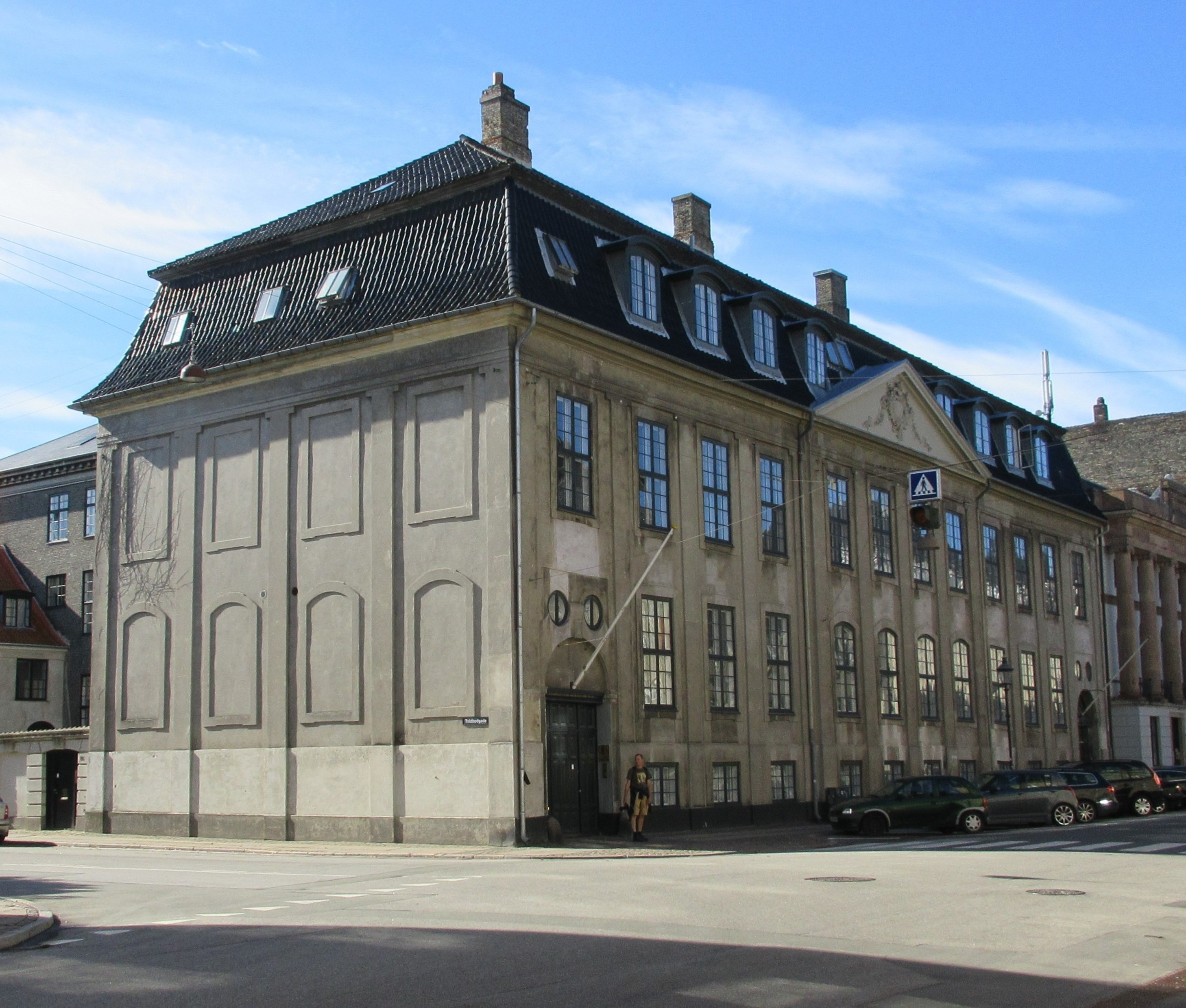
- The building on Bredgade
- Interactive map of the Jan von Osten House area

General information
- Architectural style: Baroque
- Location: Copenhagen, Denmark, Denmark
- Completed: 1760
- Client: Jan von Osten

Design and construction
- Architect: Niels Eigtved

The Jan von Osten House (Danish: Jan von Ostens Gård) is a listed Baroque style property at the corner of Amaliegade and Toldbodgade in the Frederiksstaden neighbourhood of central Copenhagen, Denmark. The building was the city home of Johan Frederik Classen from 1770. On his death. it was endowed to the Det Classenske Fideicommis which was headquartered in the building until 1970. The building was listed on the Danish registry of protected buildings and places in 1918.

== History ==
The building at No.. 40-42 was built for timber merchant Jan von Osten to a design by Niels Eigtved from 1752 to 1754. Construction took place between 1756 and 1760.

The building was acquired by the prominent industrialist Johan Frederik Classen and made his city home in 1770. The building was ceded to Det Classenske Fideicommis following Classen's death in 1792. The foundation was responsible for the construction of the Classen Library at the neighbouring site- The foundation owned the building and was headquartered there until 1970 when it moved to Corselitze on the island of Falster.

The prominent industrialist Johan Frederik Classen lived in the house from 1770 until his death in 1792. The agent Conrad Caspar Hauser also lived in the building from 1670 until 1783.

Prime minister Frederik Julius Kaas lived in the house from 1812 until 1820. Later residents include the politician and baron Carl Blixen-Finecke who lived there in the 1850s and also owned Dallund Manor on the island of Funen. The naval officer Siguard Bojesen was at the time of the 1885 a resident in the building.

== Architecture ==
The 12-bay main wing has a symmetrical facade with two gates and a central projection tipped by a triangular pediment on amaliegade. The complex also comprises a rear wing and several lower buildings.

== See also ==
- English Terrace (Toldbodgade)
