= August Schiøtt =

Danish painter (1823–1895)

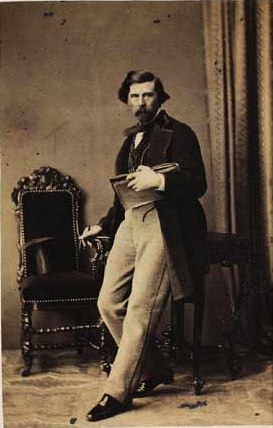
Schiøtt (1862)

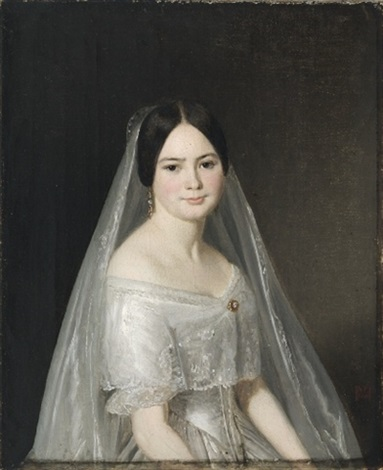
Schiøtt's wife Betty Augusta Ultima Schiøtt, née Søth

Heinrich August Georg Schiøtt (17 December 1823 – 25 June 1895) was a Danish portrait painter.

== Biography ==
August Schiøtt was born in Helsingør, Denmark. He was the son of Heinrich Erpecum Schiøtt and Anna Sophie Marie Fleron. His father was a customs official. After his confirmation, he was sent to school in Copenhagen where he later entered the Royal Danish Academy of Fine Arts and had an undistinguished academic record. For a short time, he was a private student of Christoffer Wilhelm Eckersberg. His first portrait (of a child) was created in 1844, two years before his graduation. After that, he painted six to eight portraits every year.

Altogether, he presented over 150 portraits at the Charlottenborg Spring Exhibition, including several of the Royal Family: Caroline Amalie of Augustenburg (three times), Prince Ferdinand, Princess Caroline and Prince (later King) Christian. In addition to these portraits, his most notable include those of Baron Carl Frederik Blixen-Finecke, who was the grandfather-in-law of Karen Blixen, General Gerhard Christoph von Krogh, and the history painter J.L. Lund.

He was married in 1850, to Betty Augusta Ultima Søth (1820–1853), but she wife died three years later, after they returned from an Academy supported study trip to France, England and Italy. In 1854, he was named a member of the Academy. He remarried in 1855, to Mariane Ogilvie (1836–1857) and, in 1866, became a titular professor.

In 1872, he received "Det anckerske Legat"; a grant for composers, writers and artists. This enabled him to visit Southern Europe, Egypt and Palestine where he made numerous sketches of people and landscapes. In addition to his portraits, he created numerous figure compositions, such as King Wermund with his son Offa, Christ at Gethsemane and genre scenes of peasant life.

He was awarded the Order of the Dannebrog in 1880. He died at Hellebæk in 1895 and was buried at Garrison Cemetery, Copenhagen.

One of his children, Elisabeth Schiøtt (1856–1893), studied with P.S. Krøyer and Laurits Tuxen and became a landscape painter. In 1938, an auction of his and his daughter's remaining works was held at the Academy and the proceeds were used to establish a scholarship.

== Gallery ==
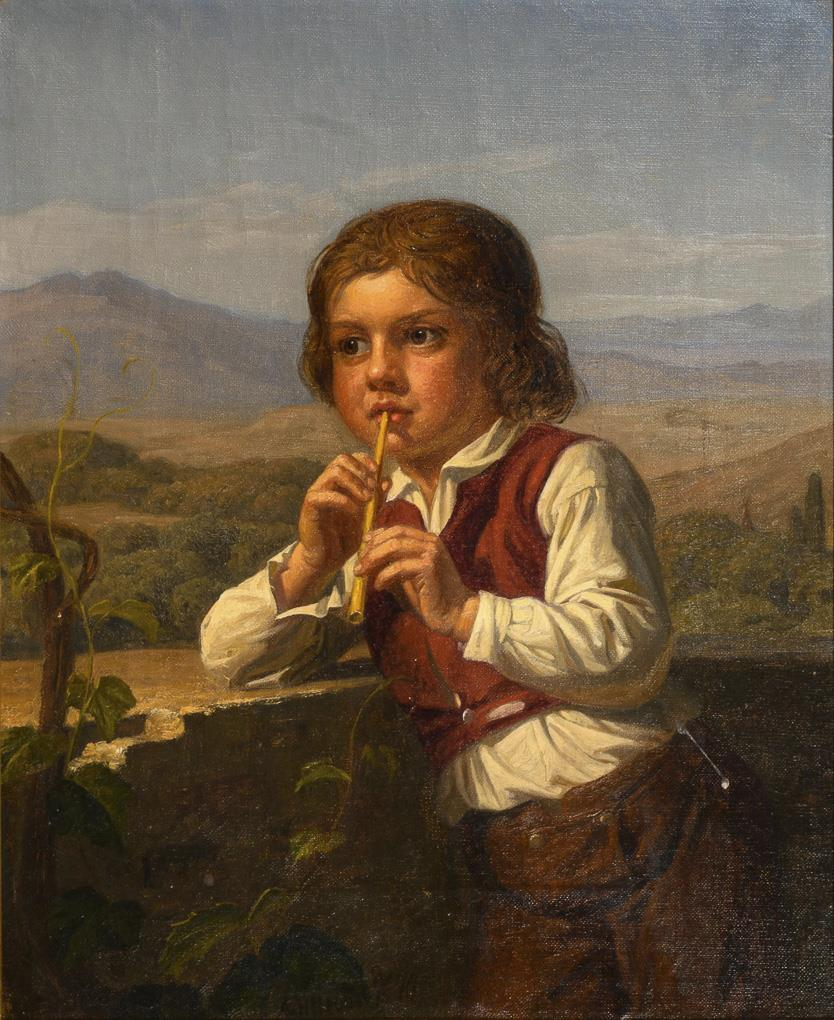
Boy playing the flute in a southern landscape, 1870

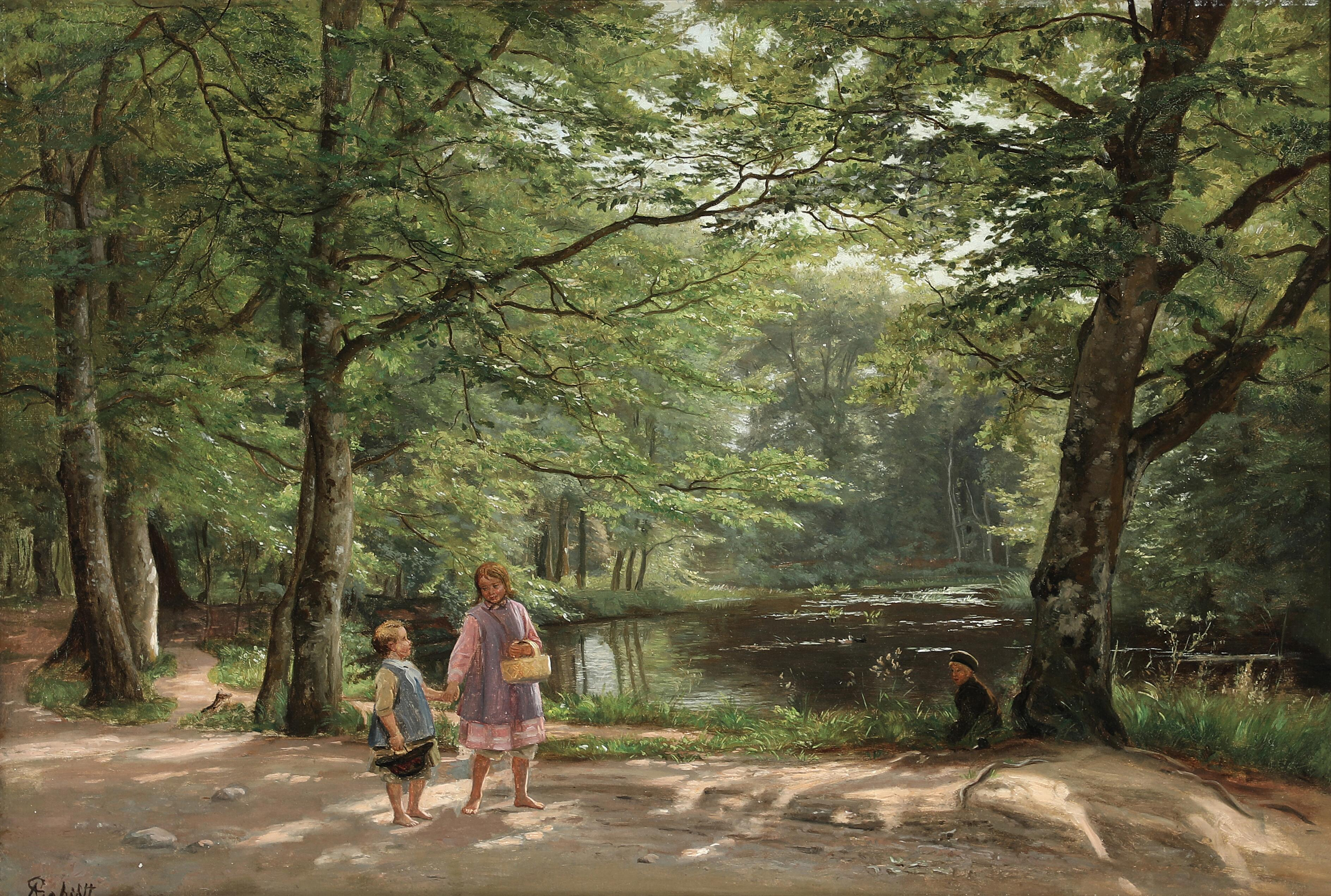
View from a forest with two children walking on a path.

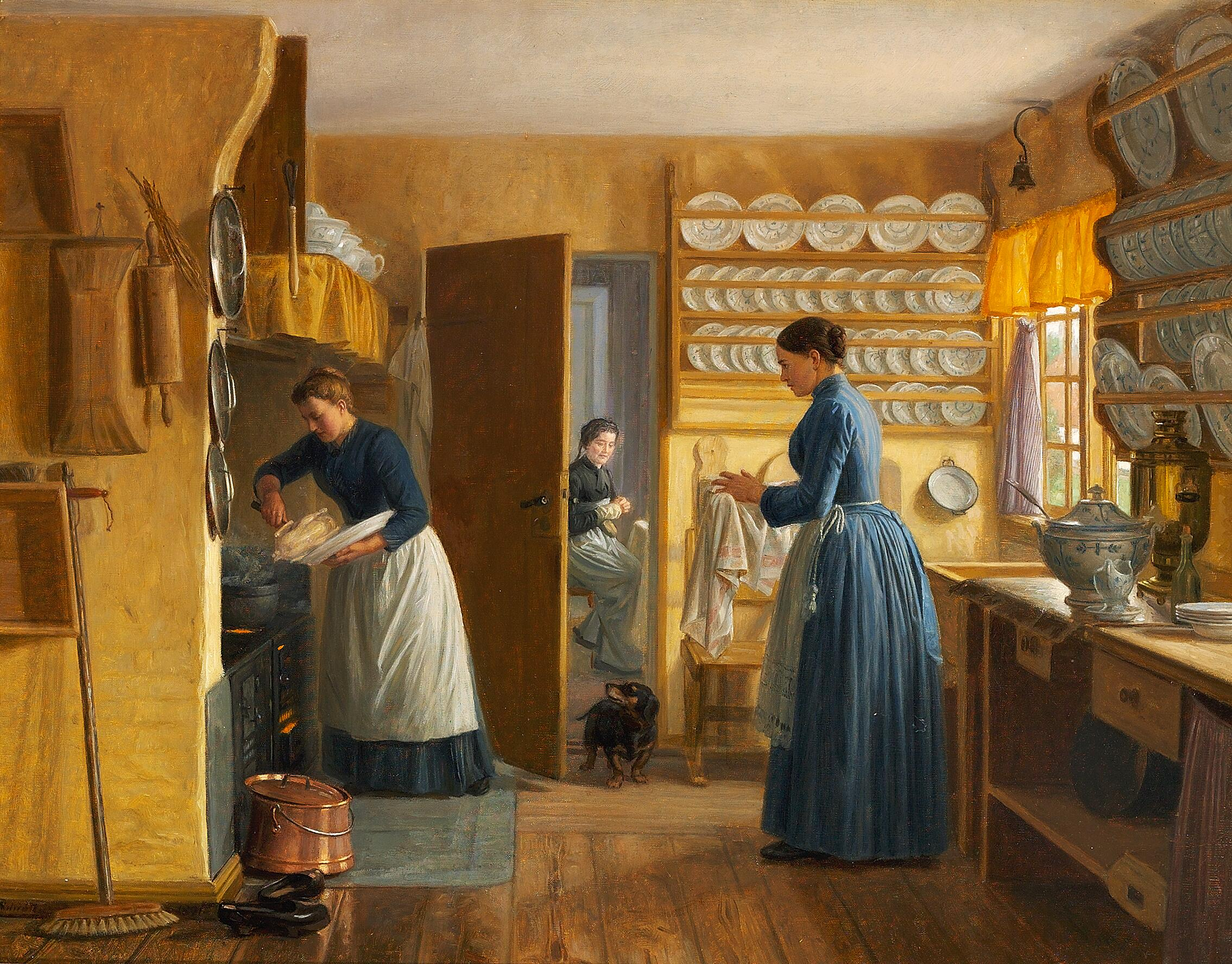
A kitchen, 1892

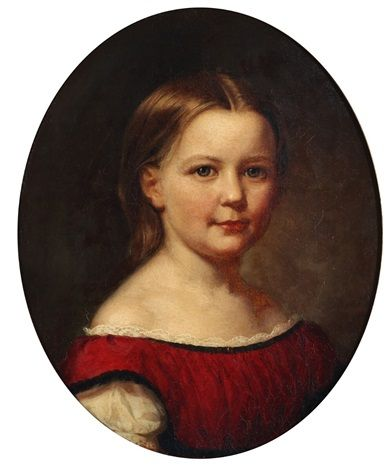
A portrait of the painters daughter Elisabeth Schiøtt, 1865

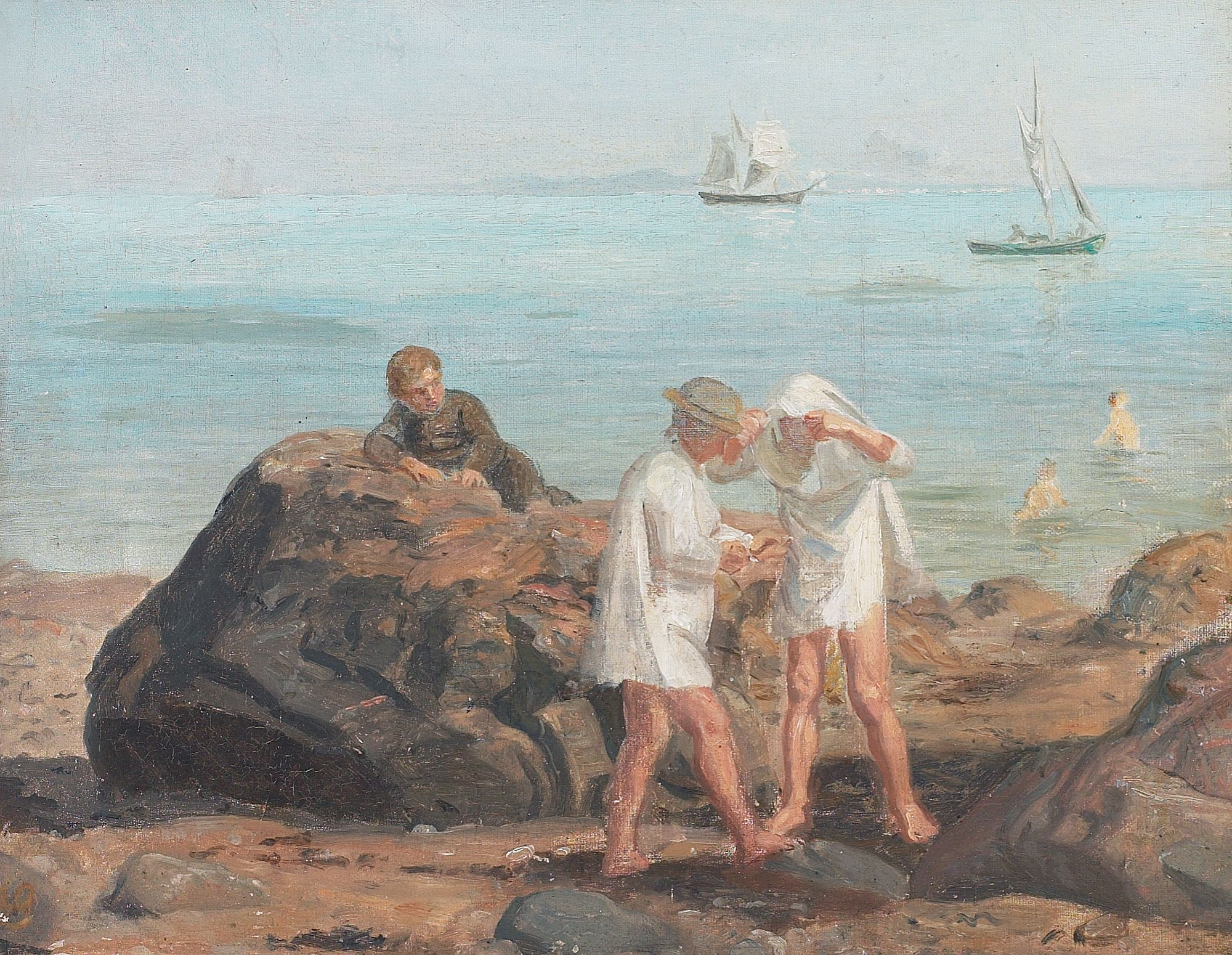
bathing boys

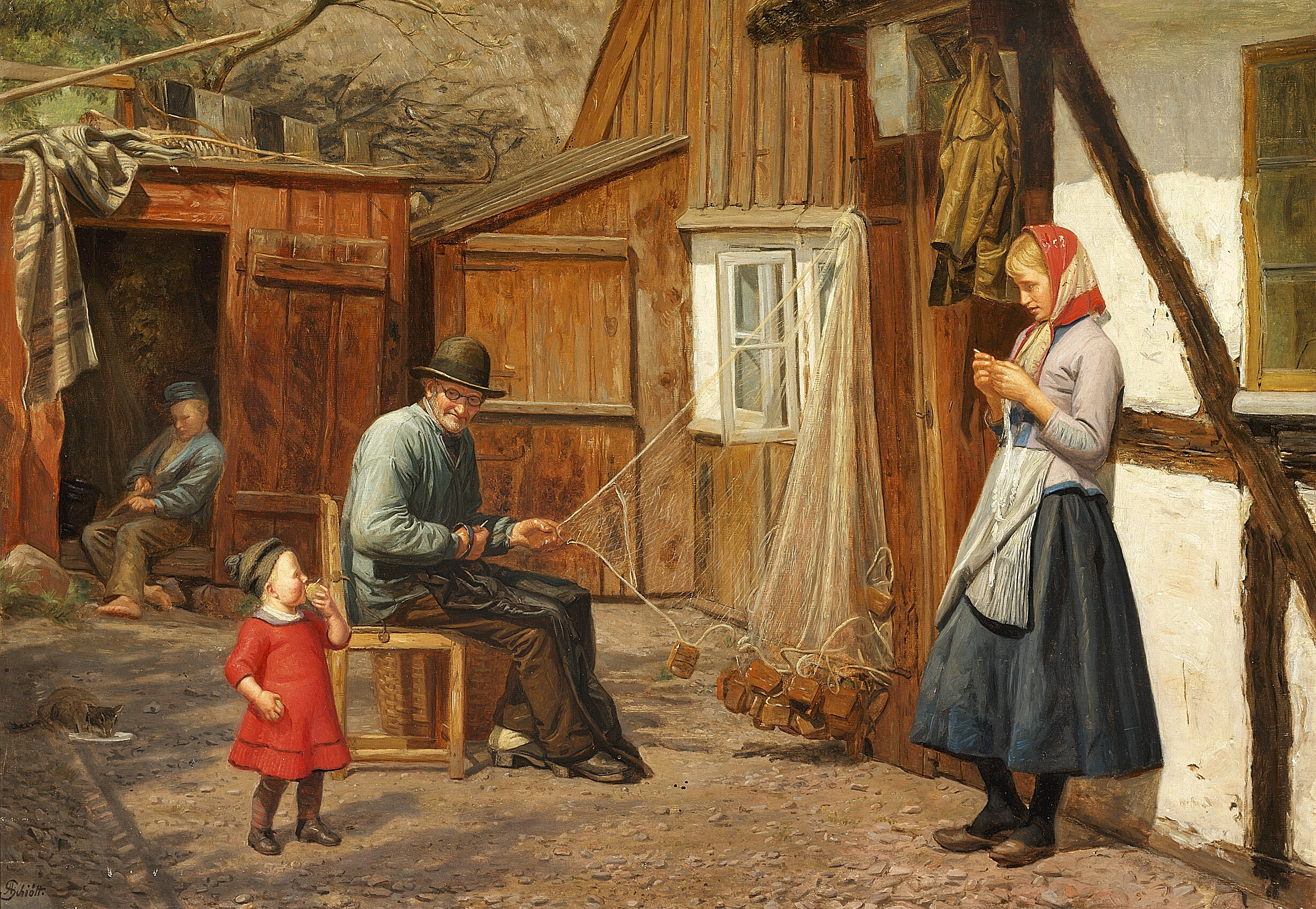
Young girl talking to a fisherman who is mending nets
