= Hans von Blixen-Finecke =

Swedish equestrian

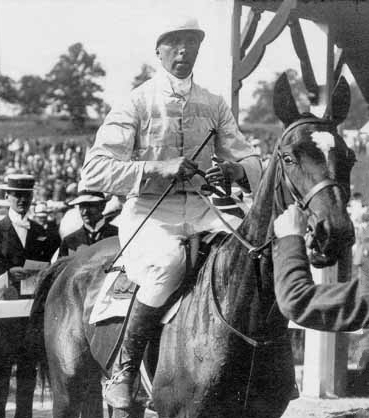
- At the 1912 Olympics

Personal information
- Born: 25 July 1886 Näsbyholm Castle, Trelleborg, Sweden
- Died: 26 September 1917 (aged 31) Malmslätt, Sweden

Sport
- Sport: Equestrian
- Event: Dressage
- Club: K6 IF, Ystad
Medal record
Representing Sweden
Olympic Games
Bronze medal – third place	1912 Stockholm	Individual dressage

Baron Hans Gustaf von Blixen-Finecke (25 July 1886 – 26 September 1917) was a Swedish officer and equestrian who won a bronze medal in dressage at the 1912 Summer Olympics. He died in an aeroplane crash in 1917.

== Early life ==
Von Blixen-Finecke was born on 25 July 1886 at Näsbyholm Castle, Sweden. He was the grandson of Carl Frederik Blixen-Finecke, and the son of Baron Fredrik von Blixen-Finecke, a Hovjägmästare, and his wife Countess Clara Krag-Juel-Wind-Frijs. He was the twin brother of Bror von Blixen-Finecke, a famed professional hunter in Africa who was married to writer Karen Blixen née Dinesen from 1914 to 1925. Hans had experienced a failed love affair with Karen, who then accepted an offer of marriage from his twin brother.

Von Blixen-Finecke passed mogenhetsexamen on 29 May 1906 and became a volunteer in the Scanian Dragoon Regiment (Skånska dragonregementet, K 6) on 31 May 1906.

== Career ==
Von Blixen-Finecke was commissioned as an officer on 19 December 1908 and served as an underlöjtnant in the Scanian Dragoon Regiment from 31 December the same year. He was promoted to lieutenant there in 1910. He was a rare equestrian talent, especially on the racetrack, where he 1910-15 was the foremost in Scandinavia, with 57 victories in 171 races. One of his achievements was when he, in 1914, after a victory in Gothenburg, flew to Klampenborg, where he had his second victory of the day. Von Blixen-Finecke won a bronze medal in dressage at the 1912 Summer Olympics. His best horses were those on his father's estate Näsbyholm, Aimable, Baccarat, Hops and Hilarion.

== Personal life ==
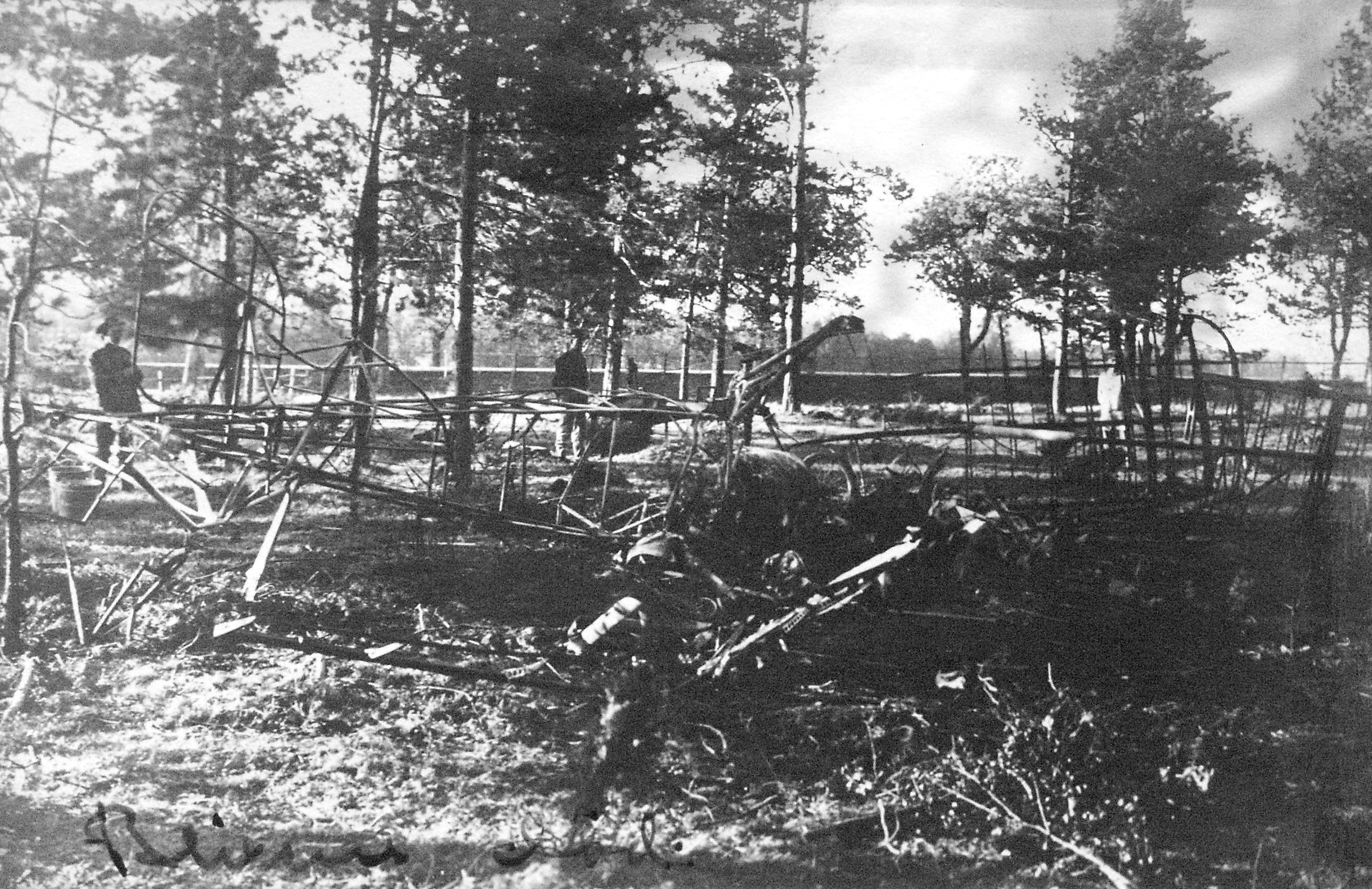
The plane of von Blixen-Finecke at the crash site

On 15 July 1915 at Trollenäs Castle he married Hilla-Brita Trolle (born 4 April 1894), the daughter of överhovjägmästaren, Baron Nils Axel Arvid Trolle and Baroness Anna Eleonora Sofia Leijonhufvud. Their son, Hans von Blixen-Finecke Jr., won two gold medals in eventing at the 1952 Summer Olympics.

== Death ==
Hans von Blixen-Finecke Sr. died in an aeroplane crash on 26 September 1917 and was buried at Gärdslöv Cemetery in Trelleborg Municipality.

== In popular culture ==
In the film Out of Africa, which is based on Karen Blixen's memoir of the same name, Austrian actor Klaus Maria Brandauer plays Hans von Blixen-Finecke. He also plays his brother Bror—he was nominated for an Academy Award for his supporting role.
