= Skurup Solar PV Park =

Photovoltaic power plant in Skurup, Skåne, Sweden

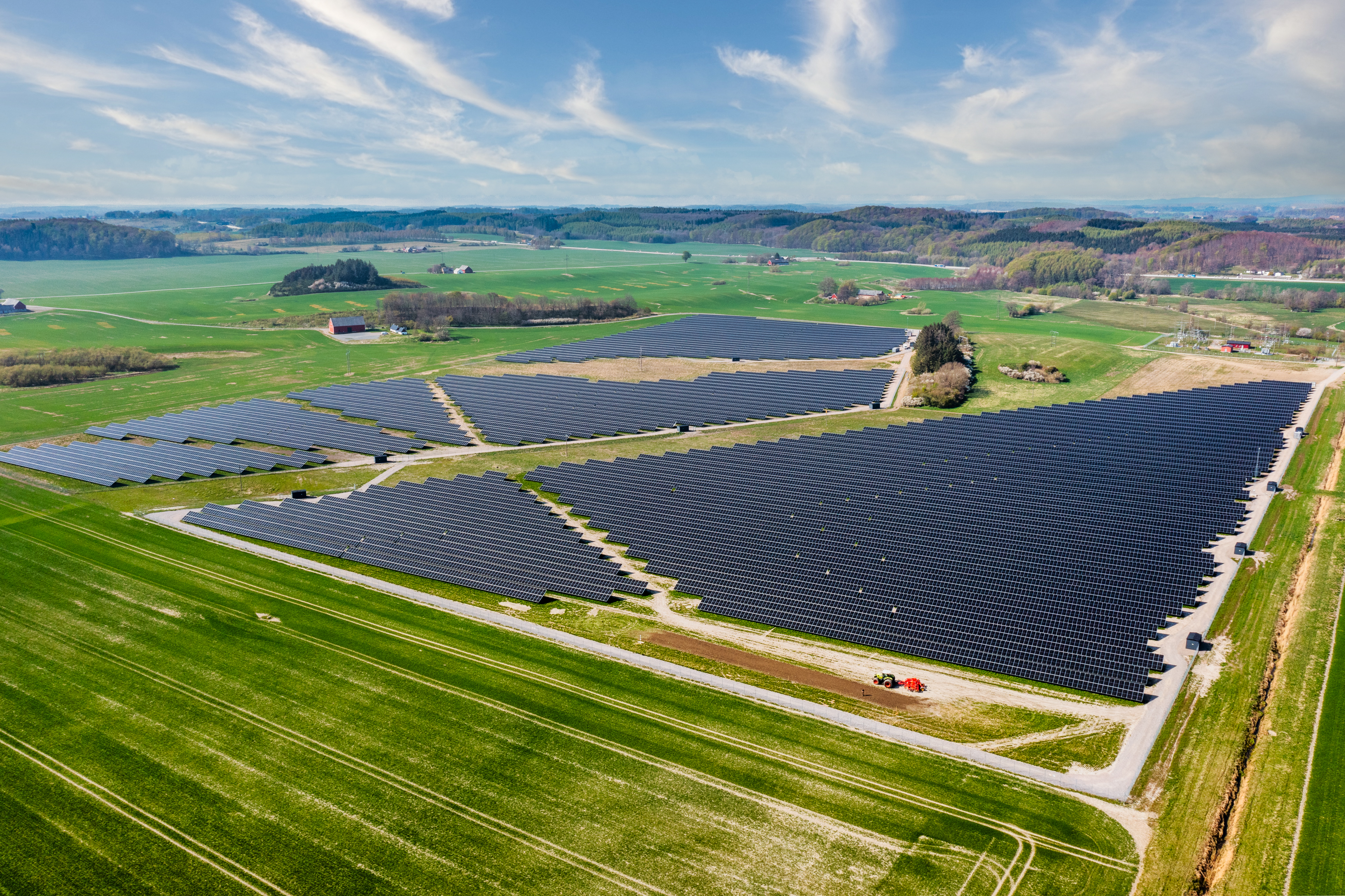
- Country: Sweden
- Location: Skurup, Skåne
- Coordinates: 55°29′12.6″N 13°26′36.6″E
- Status: Operational
- Construction began: 2020
- Commission date: 2022
- Owner

Power generation
- Nameplate capacity: 18 MW
- Annual net output: 19 GWh

The Skurup Solar PV Park is a photovoltaic power station in Skurup, Skåne County, Sweden, located on the grounds of Näsbyholm Castle. It is the largest photovoltaic power station in Sweden.

== History ==
The construction of the power station started in 2020 and production began on 19 January 2022.

== Technical specifications ==
The power station has an installed capacity of 18 MW and an annual generation of 19 GWh. It is currently the largest photovoltaic power station in Sweden. It consists of 35,000 PV modules.

== See also ==
- List of power stations in Sweden
