= Carl Frederik Blixen-Finecke =

Danish politician

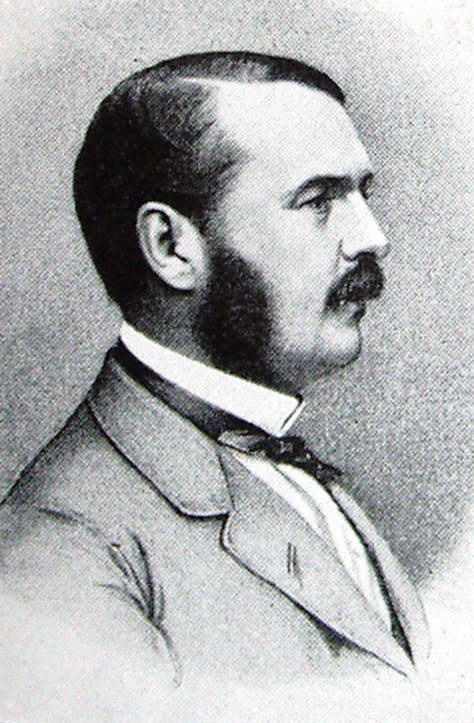
- Carl Frederik Blixen-Finecke
- Born: 15 August 1822; Dallund, Denmark
- Died: 6 January 1873 (aged 50); Baden-Baden, Germany
- Occupation: Politician
- Years active: 1851–1873
- Spouse: Princess Augusta of Hesse-Kassel (m. 1854)

Carl Frederik Axel Bror Baron von Blixen-Finecke (15 August 1822 – 6 January 1873) was a Danish politician and nobleman.

== Early life ==
Carl Frederik Blixen-Finecke was born on 15 August 1822 in Dallund to Conrad Frederik Christian Blixen-Finecke (1791–1829) and Charlotta Lovisa Gyllenkrok (1796–1829). His family originated in Pomerania. He held the family seat at Näsbyholm Castle.

== Career ==
Finecke served as a Member of Parliament from 1851 to 1852, 1858–61, and 1862–64. He served as the Minister of Foreign Affairs during Carl Edvard Rotwitt's ministry. After Rotwitt's death on 8 February 1860, he served as council president until a new government was formed.

== Family ==
Carl baron Blixen was married two times. First in 1842 with Gustafva Charlotta Adelaide Sofia Ankarcrona (1821-1890) with whom he had two children, a son Frederik Theodor Hans Anna Wolfgang Christian Blixen-Finecke (1847-1919) and a daughter Charlotta Antoinette Louise Ulrikka Blixen-Finecke (1845-1928).

They divorced and in 1854 he married Princess Auguste Sophie Friederike of Hesse-Kassel, daughter of Prince William of Hesse-Kassel and Princess Charlotte of Denmark. The couple had two sons, Wilhelm Carl Ferdinand Christian von Blixen-Finecke and Wilhelm Carl Anna Otto Gunnar Axel von Blixen-Finecke.

His grandsons by his son Frederik were the Swedish nobleman Bror von Blixen-Finecke, and equestrian Hans von Blixen-Finecke.

Political offices
Preceded by Carl Christian Hall	Foreign Minister of Denmark; 2 December 1859 – 24 February 1860	Succeeded by Carl Christian Hall
