= Prince William of Hesse-Kassel =

European aristocrat (1787–1867)

Prince William
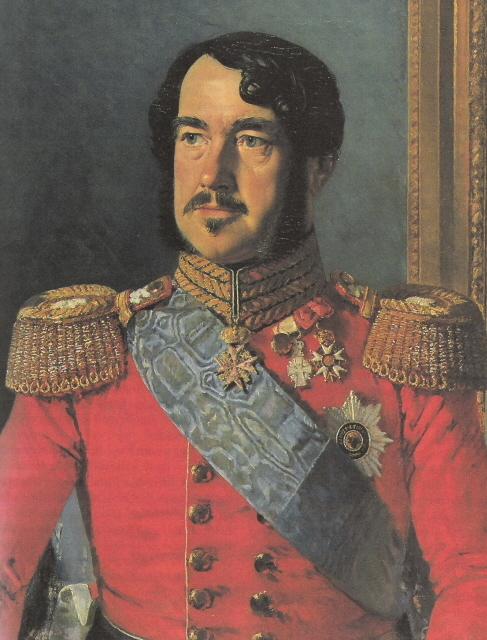
- Portrait, c. 1810–1835
- Born: 24 December 1787; Biebrich, Landgraviate of Hesse-Kassel
- Died: 5 September 1867 (aged 79); Copenhagen, Kingdom of Denmark
- Spouse: Princess Louise Charlotte of Denmark (m. 1810; died 1864)
- Issue: Princess Karoline; Princess Marie Luise Charlotte of Hesse-Kassel; Louise, Queen of Denmark; Friedrich Wilhelm, Landgrave of Hesse; Auguste, Baroness Carl Frederik of Blixen-Finecke; Princess Sophie Wilhelmine
- House: Hesse-Kassel
- Father: Prince Frederick of Hesse-Kassel
- Mother: Princess Caroline of Nassau-Usingen

Prince William of Hesse-Kassel (24 December 1787 – 5 September 1867) was the first son of Prince Frederick of Hesse-Kassel and Princess Caroline of Nassau-Usingen. He was titular Landgrave of Hesse-Kassel-(Rumpenheim) and for many years heir presumptive to the throne of Hesse-Kassel.

== Life and career ==
Prince William was born in Biebrich on Christmas Eve in 1787, the son of Prince Frederick of Hesse-Kassel and Princess Caroline of Nassau-Usingen. His father was himself a younger son of Frederick II, Landgrave of Hesse-Kassel and Princess Mary of Great Britain.

Prince William lived most of his life in Denmark where he had several posts in the Danish military. He was military governor of Copenhagen from 1834 until 1848. He lived for many years in Prince William Mansion, Copenhagen and afterwards in Brockdorff's Palace part of Amalienborg Palace, the official residence for the Danish royal family. As a summer residence the family used Charlottenlund Palace outside of Copenhagen.

Besides his Danish residences, he also had part ownership of the family castle, Rumpenheim Castle. The castle served as a meeting place for the Hesse-Kassel-Rumpenheim branch for many years and gathered Danish, Hesse, British and other royal families.

Landgrave William took a keen interest in Danish affairs of state and in the succession issues in the 1840s. He and his wife Charlotte were among the leading figures in Denmark, especially after his brother-in-law, Christian VIII of Denmark became king in 1839.

Landgrave William was known for his ultra-conservatism, but also for his hospitality, honesty, loyalty, and generosity.

He died in 1867 in Copenhagen, the year after Hesse-Kassel was annexed to Prussia. He was buried at Rumpenheim Castle.

== Marriage and children ==
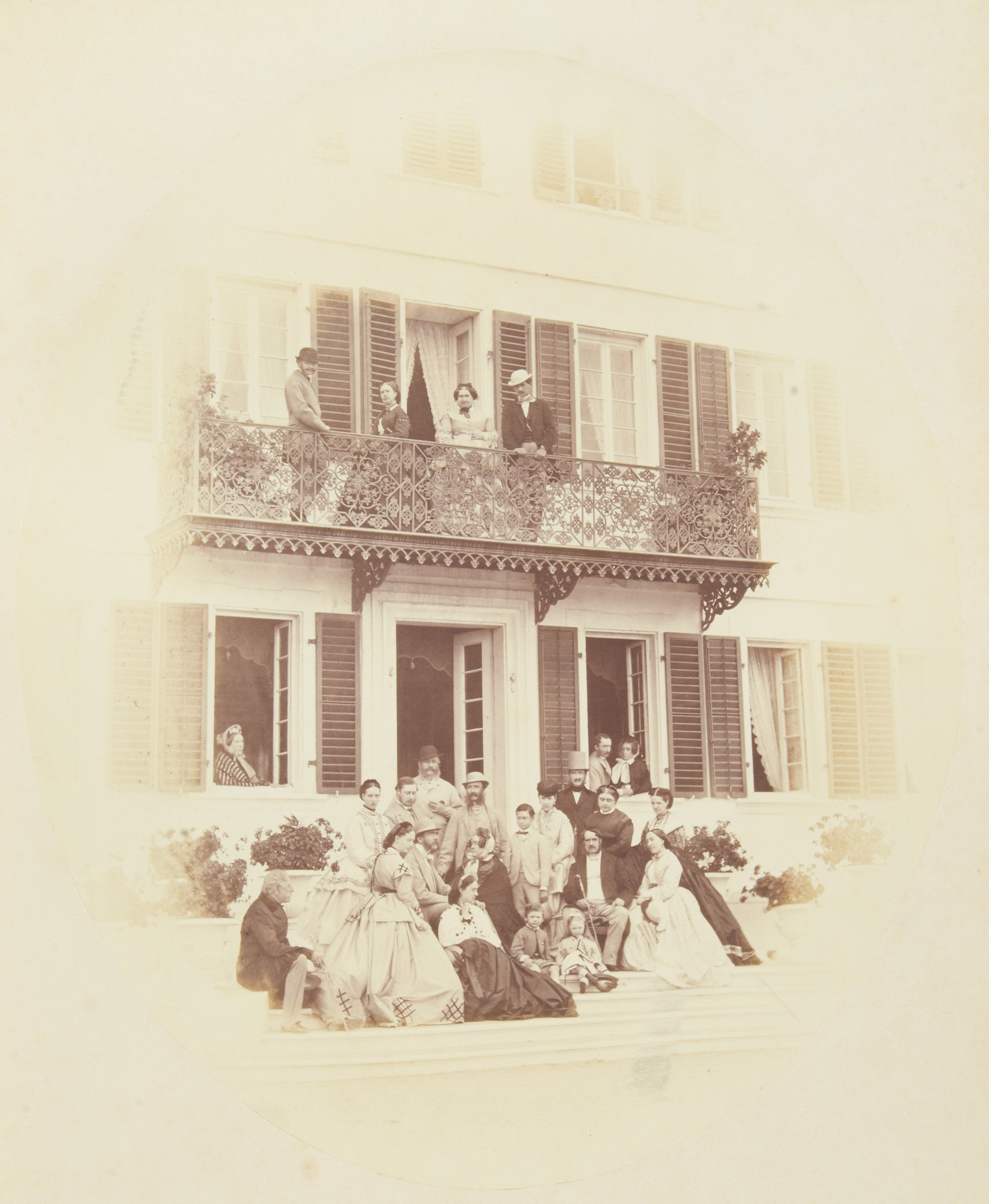
Gathering of royals in the castle of Rumpenheim (Including Landgrave Wilhelm (seated to the right in the picture), his grandson-in-law Albert Edward, Prince of Wales, later King Edward VII, his granddaughter Princess Alexandra of Wales, later Queen Alexandra, and his niece Princess Mary Adelaide of Cambridge, later Duchess of Teck, 1865)

On 10 November 1810, William was married in Amalienborg Palace to Princess Louise Charlotte of Denmark, daughter of Hereditary Prince Frederick of Denmark and Norway and Sophia Frederica of Mecklenburg-Schwerin.

Children of the marriage:

- Karoline Friederike Marie of Hesse-Kassel (15 August 1811 – 10 May 1829).
- Princess Marie Luise Charlotte of Hesse-Kassel (9 May 1814 – 28 July 1895). Married Prince Frederick Augustus of Anhalt-Dessau.
- Louise of Hesse-Kassel (7 September 1817 – 29 September 1898). Married King Christian IX of Denmark.
- Friedrich Wilhelm (26 November 1820 – 14 October 1884). Head of House of Hesse-Kassel. Married first Grand Duchess Alexandra Nikolaievna of Russia, a daughter of Nicholas I of Russia and Charlotte of Prussia, and second Anna of Prussia.
- Auguste Sophie Friederike of Hesse-Kassel (30 October 1823 – 17 July 1889). Married Carl Frederik Blixen-Finecke, Baron von Blixen-Finecke, Lord of Näsbyholm.
- Sophie Wilhelmine of Hesse-Kassel (18 January – 20 December 1827).

Landgrave Wilhelm is the maternal grandfather of Queen Alexandra of the United Kingdom, King Frederick VIII of Denmark, King George I of Greece, Empress Maria Feodorovna of Russia, and Grand Duchess Adelheid of Luxembourg and paternal grandfather of Prince Frederick Charles of Hesse (elected King of Finland on 9 October 1918, but renounced the throne on 14 December 1918).

== Ancestry ==
Ancestors of Prince William of Hesse-Kassel

8. William VIII, Landgrave of Hesse-Kassel
4. Frederick II, Landgrave of Hesse-Kassel
9. Dorothea Wilhelmine of Saxe-Zeitz
2. Prince Frederick of Hesse-Kassel
10. George II of Great Britain
5. Princess Mary of Great Britain
11. Caroline of Ansbach
1. Prince William of Hesse-Kassel
12. Charles, Prince of Nassau-Usingen
6. Charles William, Prince of Nassau-Usingen
13. Princess Christine Wilhelmine of Saxe-Eisenach
3. Princess Caroline of Nassau-Usingen
14. Christian Karl Reinhard of Leiningen-Dagsburg-Falkenburg
7. Countess Caroline Felizitas of Leiningen-Dagsburg
15. Katharina Polyxena of Solms-Rödelheim and Assenheim
