= English Terrace (Toldbodgade) =

The English Terrace
- De Engelske Rækkehuse
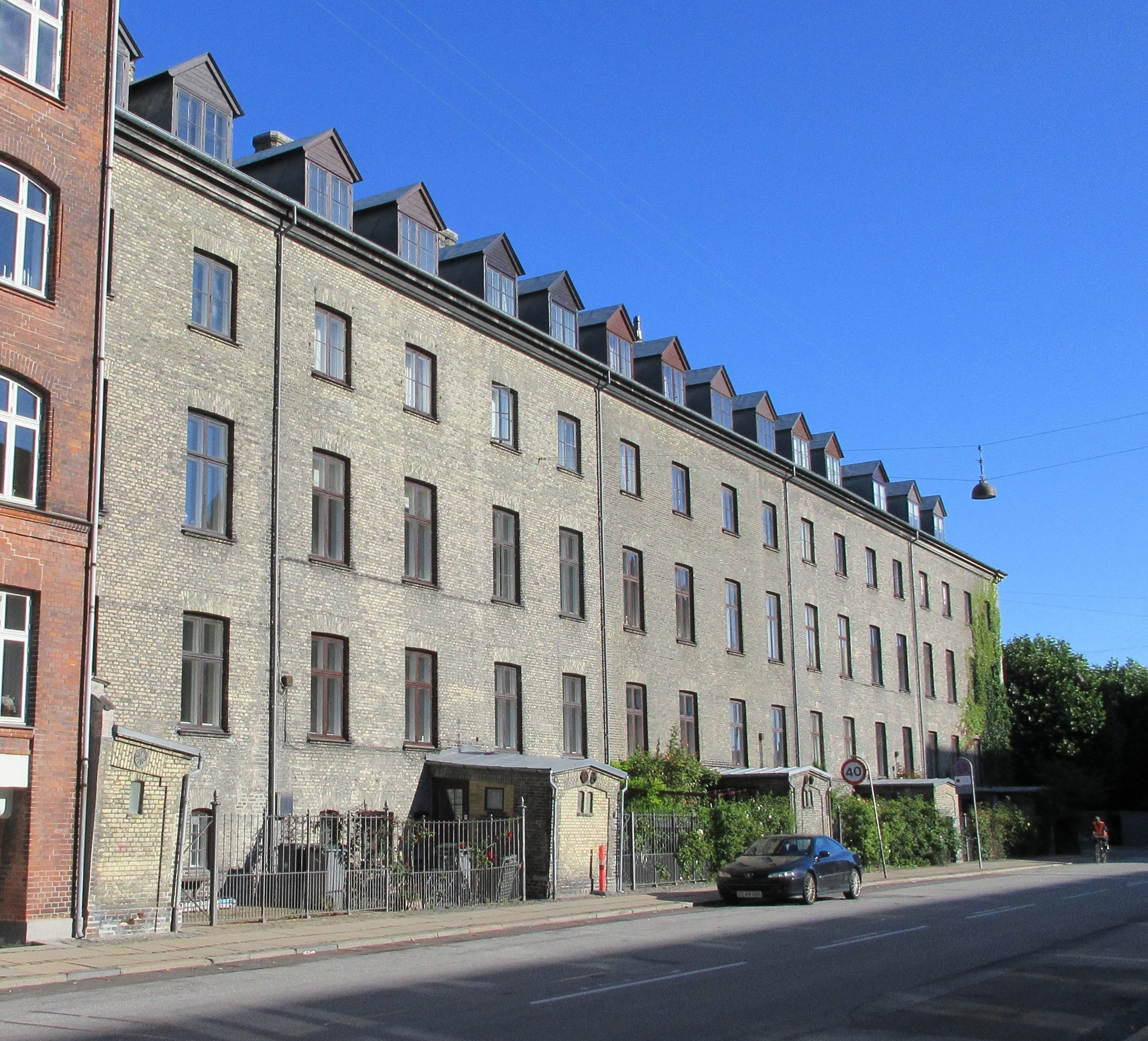
- Interactive map of the The English Terrace area

General information
- Location: Copenhagen, Denmark
- Coordinates: 55°41′9.1″N 12°35′46.24″E
- Completed: 1874
- Client: Det Classenske Fideicommis

Design and construction
- Architect: Vilhelm Tvede

The English Terrace (Danish: De Engelske Rækkehuse) at Toldbodgade 71– 87 is a row of consecutive terraced houses in the Frederiksstaden neighbourhood of central Copenhagen, Denmark. The terrace was built in 1873–74 to design by Vilhelm Tvede for Det Classenske Fideicommis. It is listed.

== History ==
=== Background ===
The Jan von Osten House at Amaliegade was purchased by Johan Frederik Classen in 1770. After his death in 1792, the property was taken over by Det Classenske Fideicommis.

=== The English Terrace ===
In the early 1870s, the foundation charged Vilhelm Tvede with the design of a residential project for the garden. He designed a single row of terraced houses inspired by English architecture. It was built in 1873–74. The houses were originally rented out but were sold off individually in the 1970s. Former residents include the architect Hans Munk Hansen.

The individual houses have later been sold as condominiums. They were originally fronted by small front gardens and a small shed building towards Toldbodgade. These have disappeared in conjunction with an widening of the street.

== Gallery ==
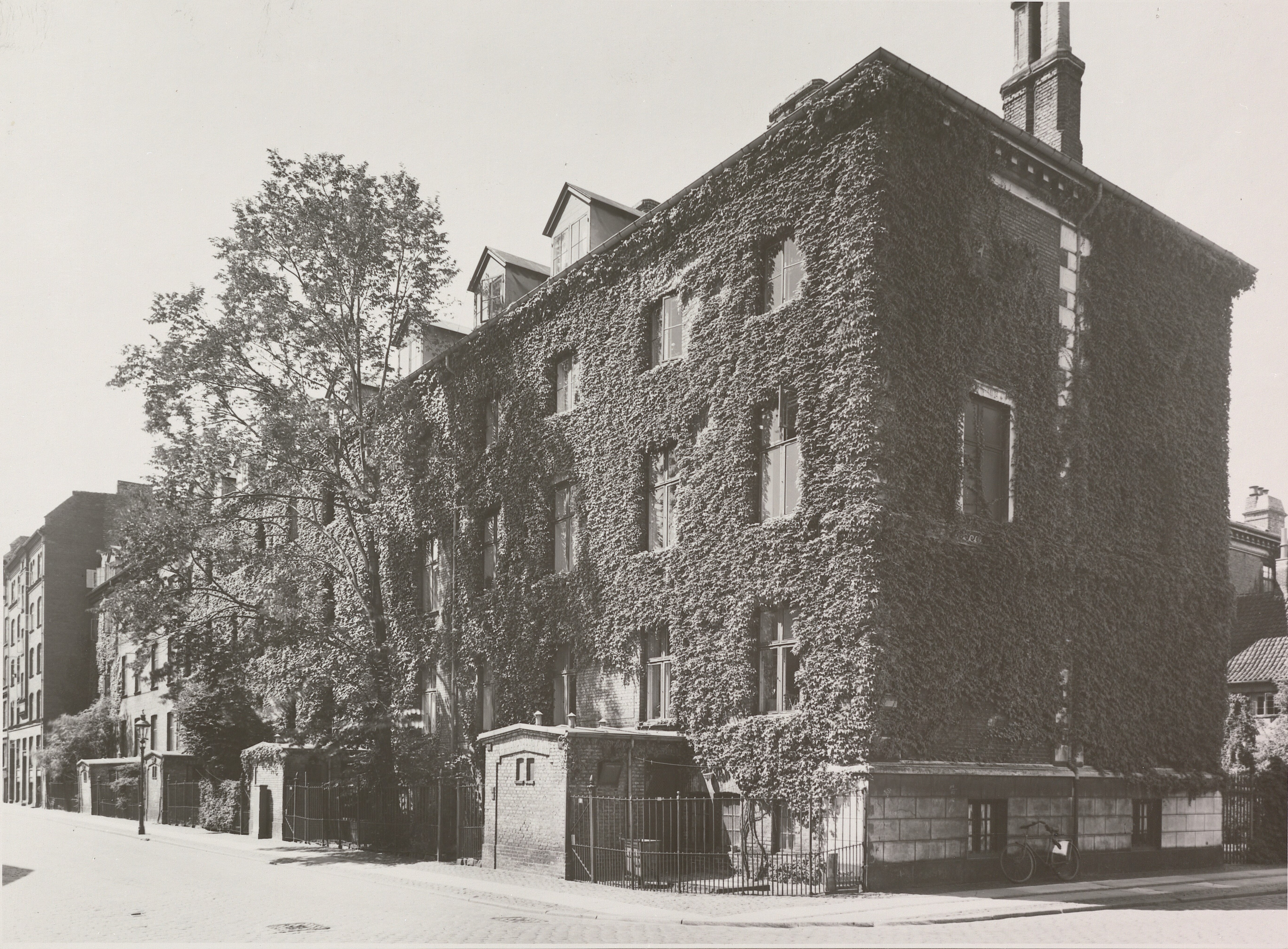
The terrace viewed from the street

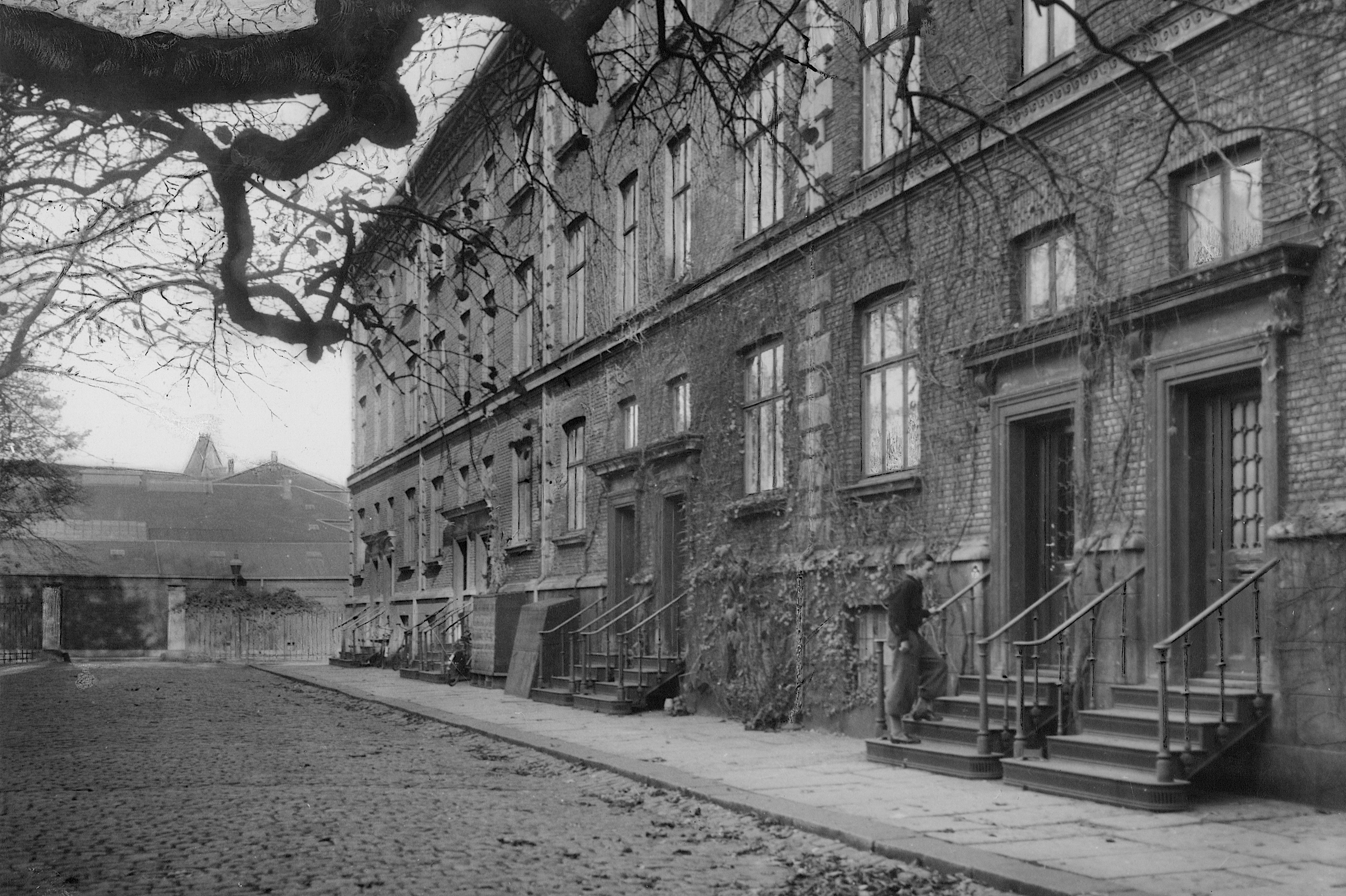
The buildings seen from the yard in the 20th century

== Architecture ==
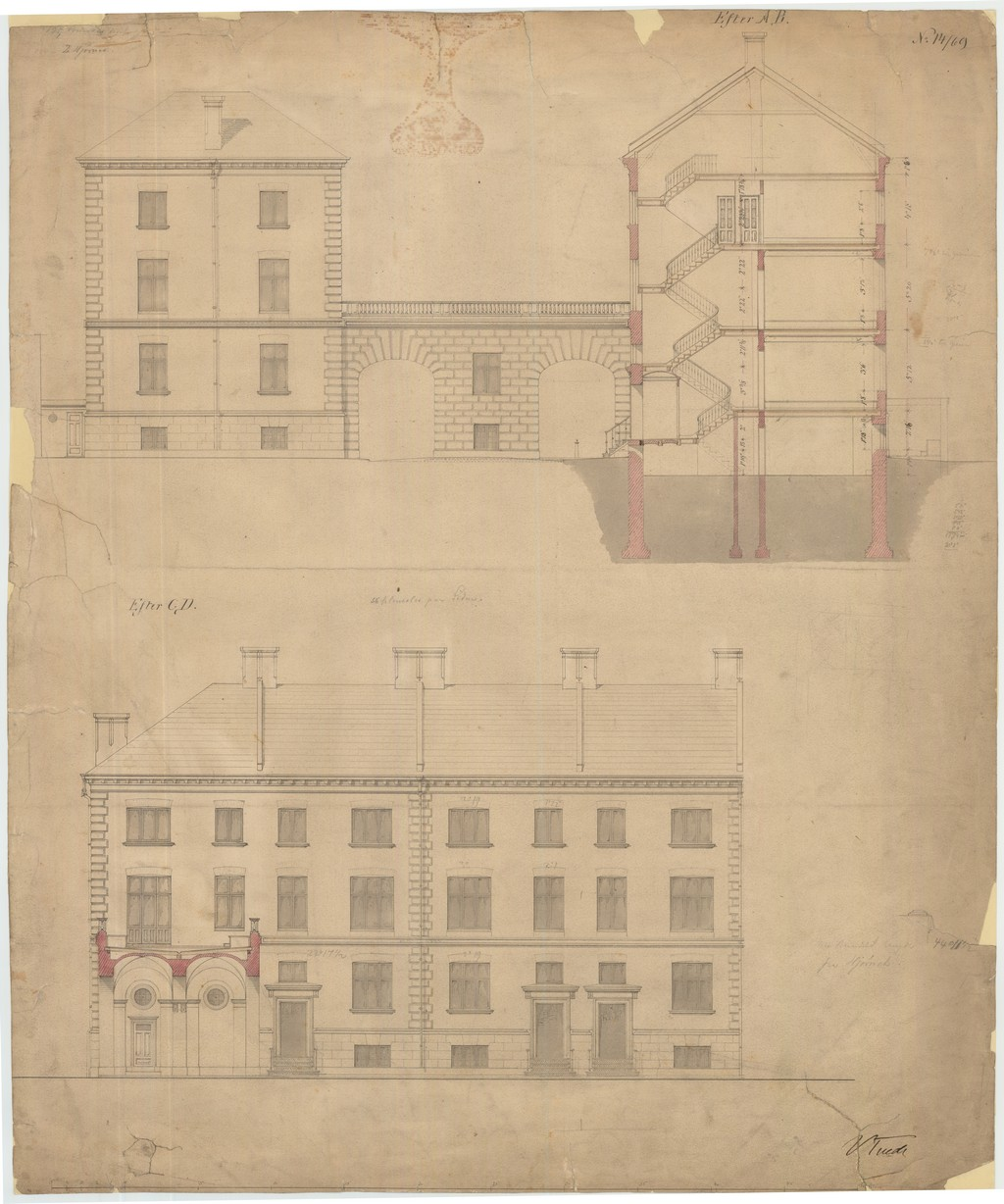
Rendering

The terrace consists of nine terraced houses. The main entrances face a courtyard situated between the terrace to the east and the Jan van Osten House to the west. Each house has an area of approximately 400 square metres and consists of three storeys, attic and basement.

The houses were listed in 1978. The scope of the heritage listing was expanded in 2002 to include the pavement and granite curb in the courtyard.

== Image gallery ==
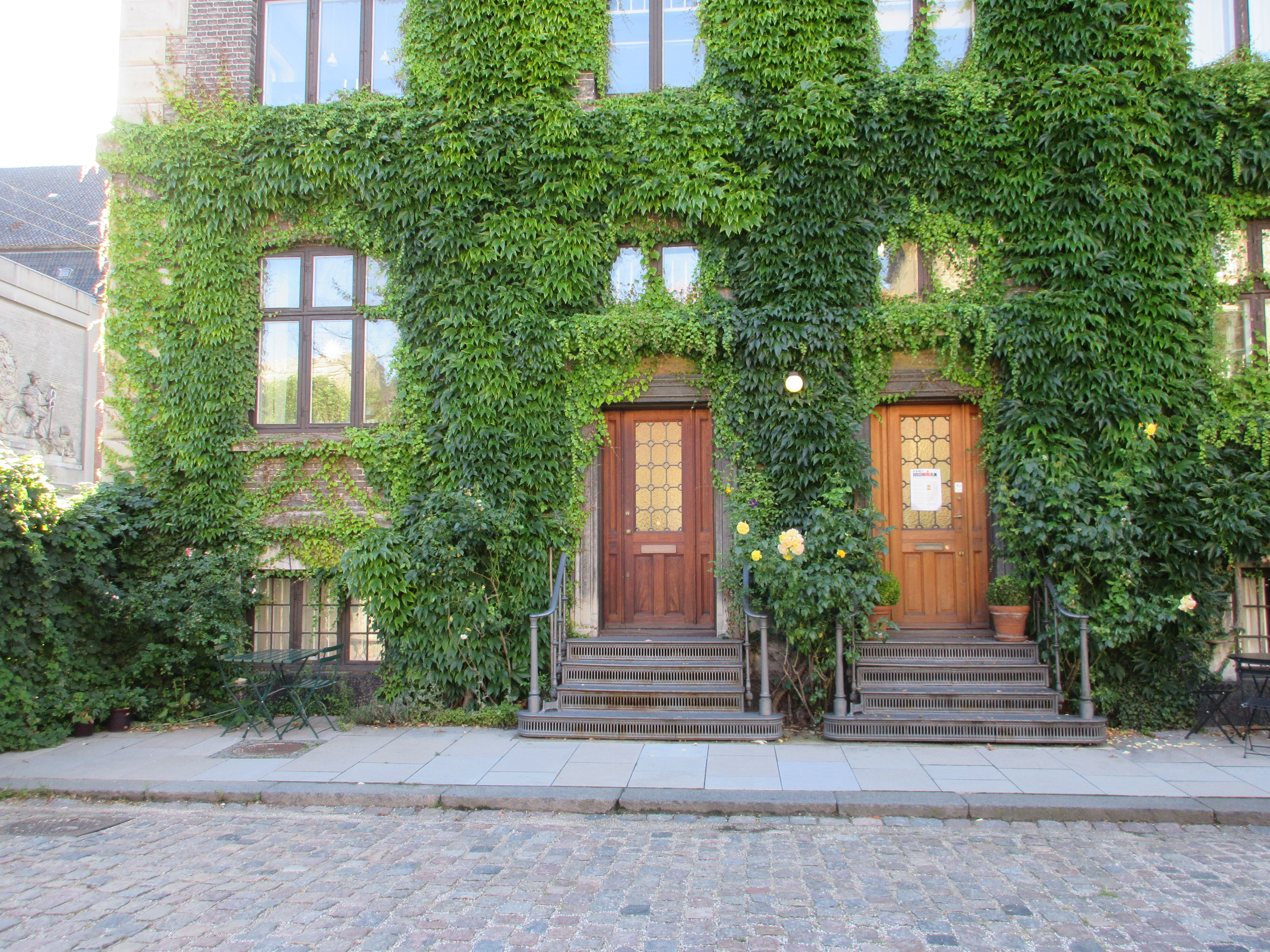
Main entrances

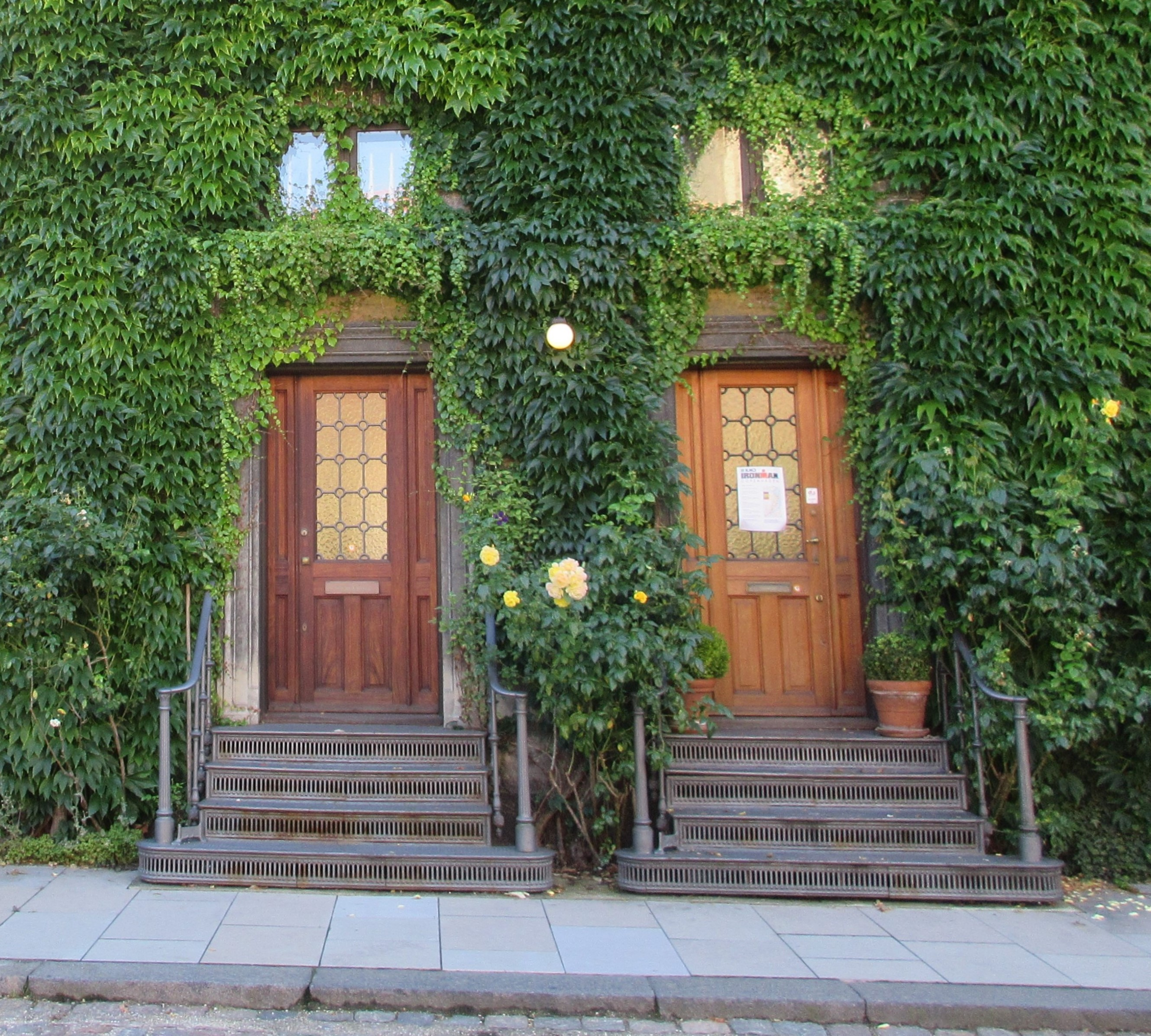
Doors

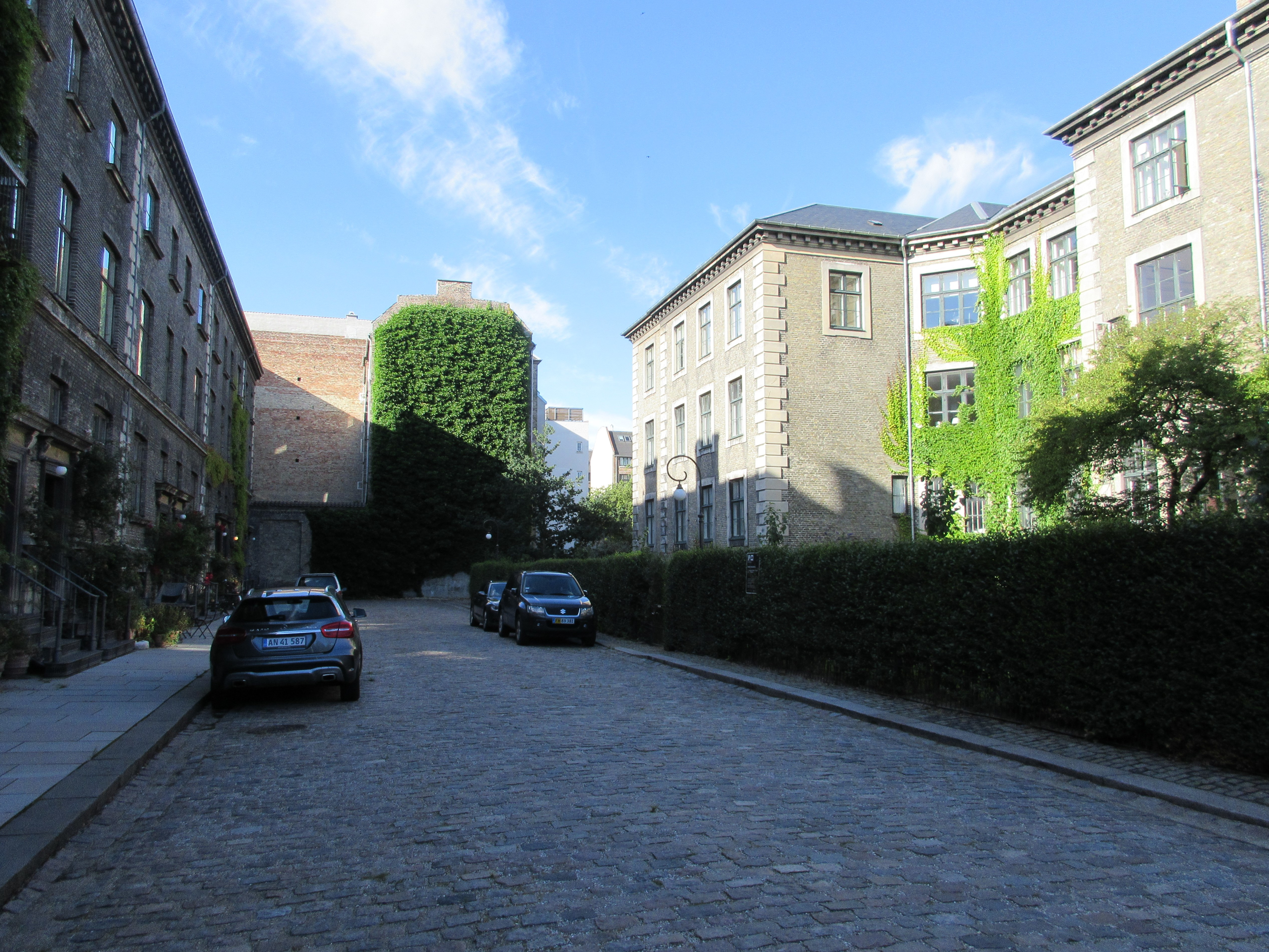
Courtyard

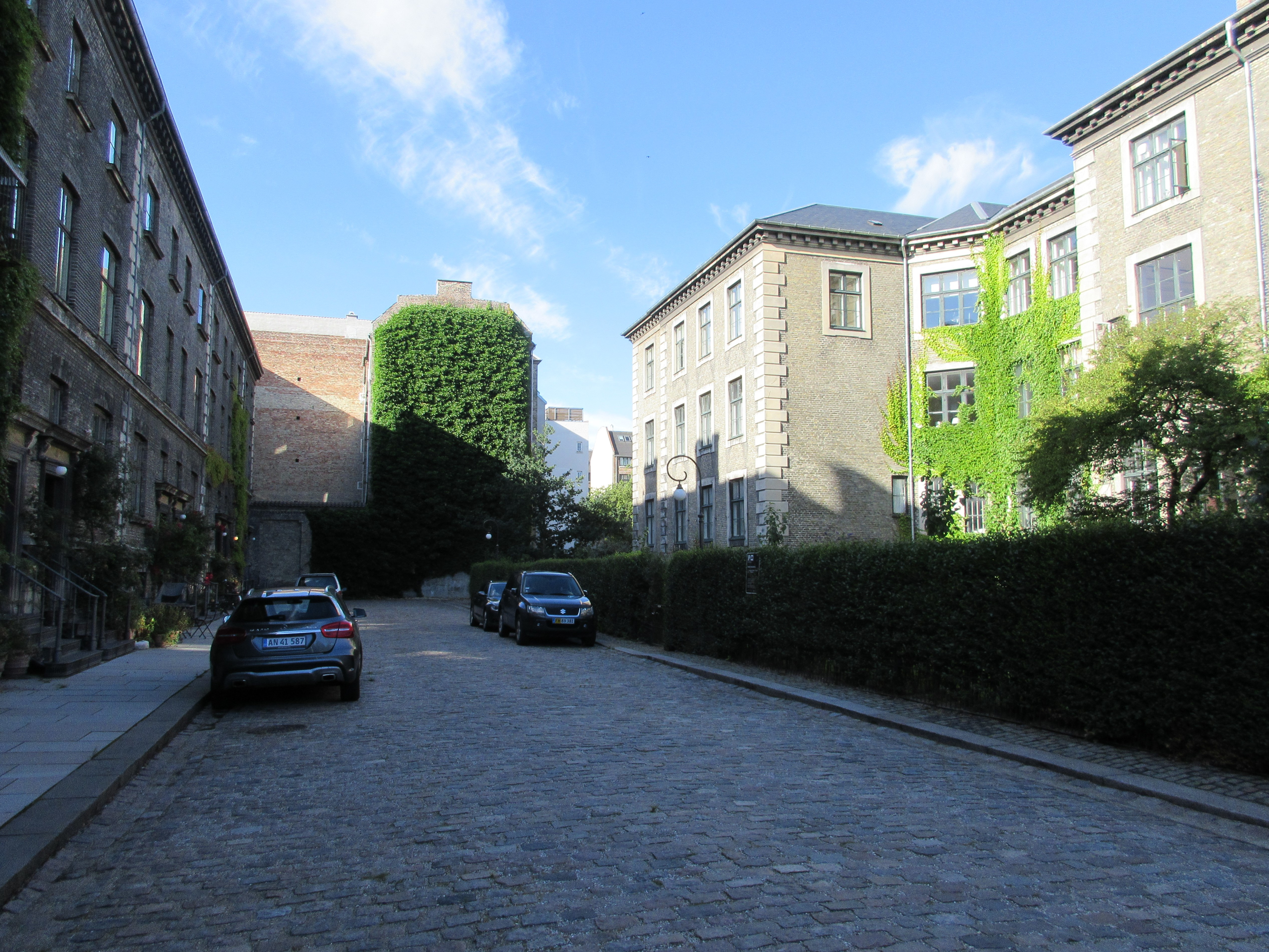
The courtyard

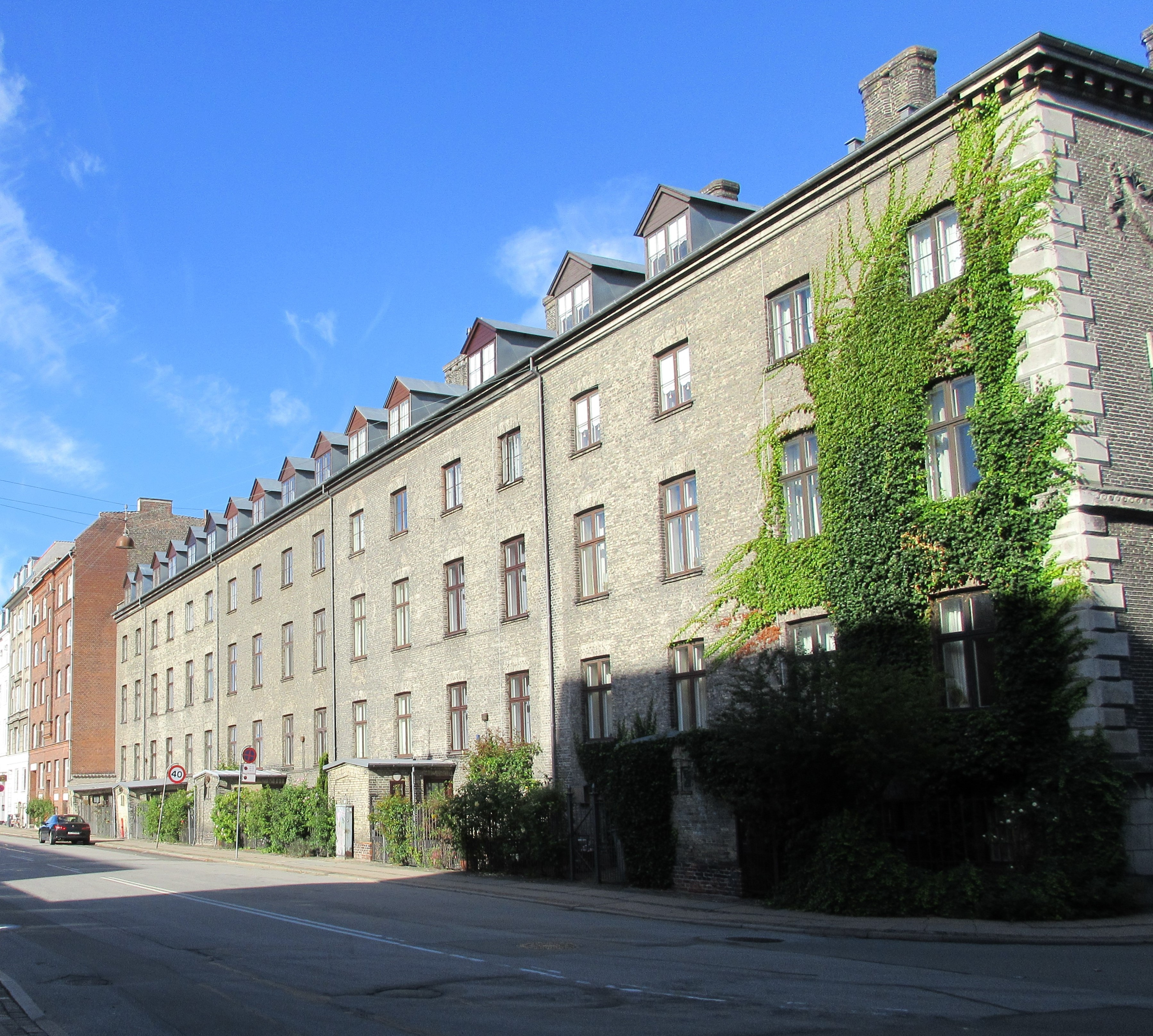
The facade on Toldbodgade
