= Dallund =

Manor house in Nordfyn Municipality, Denmark

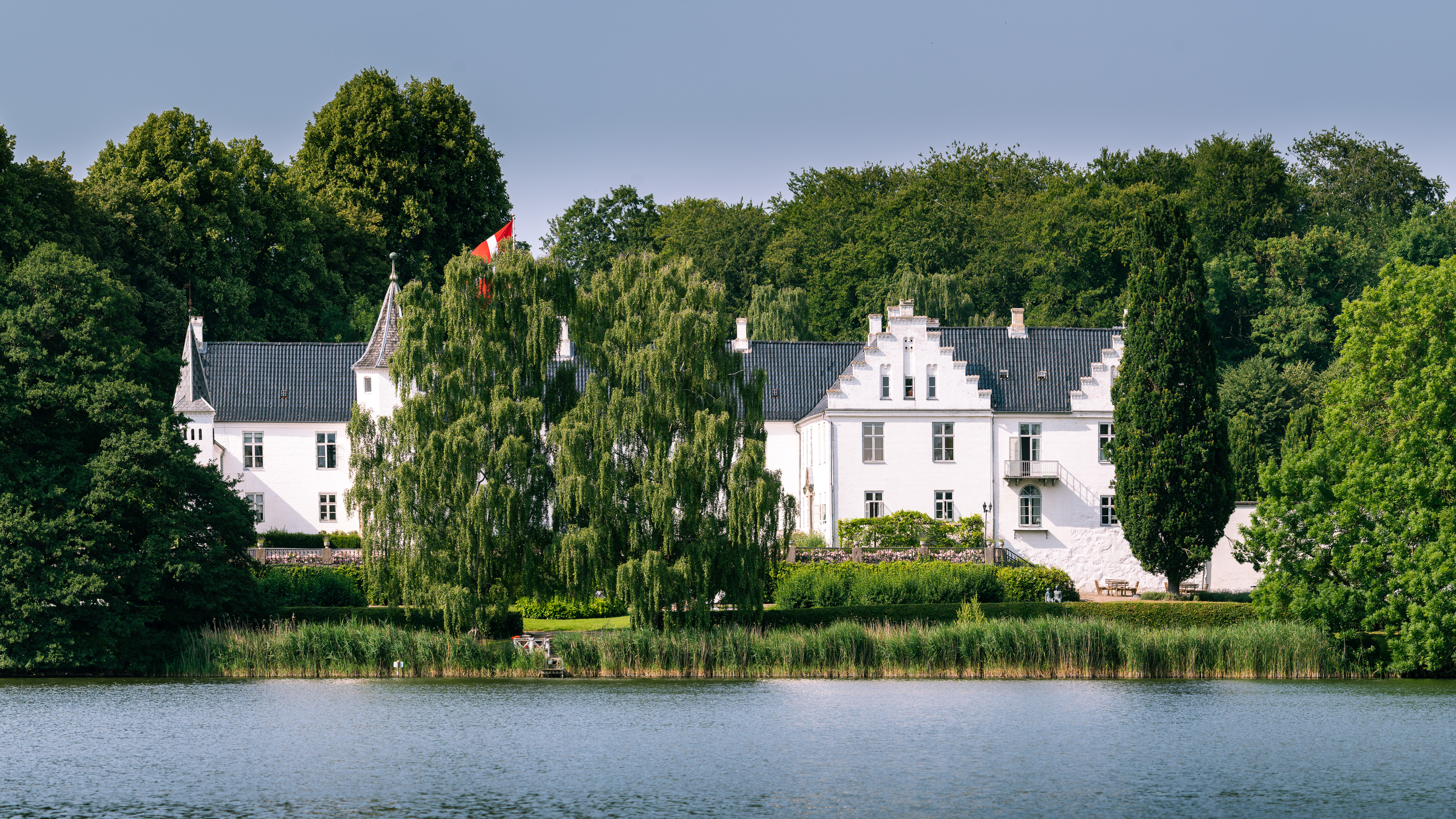
- Dallund seen from the lake - Photo by: Magnus Asmussen
- Interactive map of the Dallund area

General information
- Architectural style: Historicist
- Location: Nordfyn Municipality, Denmark
- Coordinates: 55.4851°N 10.2794°E
- Construction started: 1540
- Completed: 1849

Design and construction
- Architect: Niels Sigfred Nebelong

Dallund is a manor house located 15 km north-west of Odense on the Danish island of Funen. It now serves as a rehabilitation centre for cancer patients.

== History and architecture ==
Dallund is first mentioned in 1340 and was in the possession of the Bryske family until 1614 and later, from 1792 to 1915, by the Blixen-Finecke family.

The east and north wings of the main building were originally built in about 1530. The staircase tower dates from an extension of the north wing in 1634 and the east wing was altered in about 1723. The two east facing lateral wings were designed by Niels Sigfred Nebelong for then owner Carl Frederik Blixen-Finecke and built in 1849.

== Dallund today ==
After many years as a rehabilitation centre ownership changed in 2016 and the new owner opened the historic buildings as a "green" hotel.
