= Näsbyholm Castle =

Castle in Scania, Sweden

- Näsbyholms slott
- Skurup Municipality
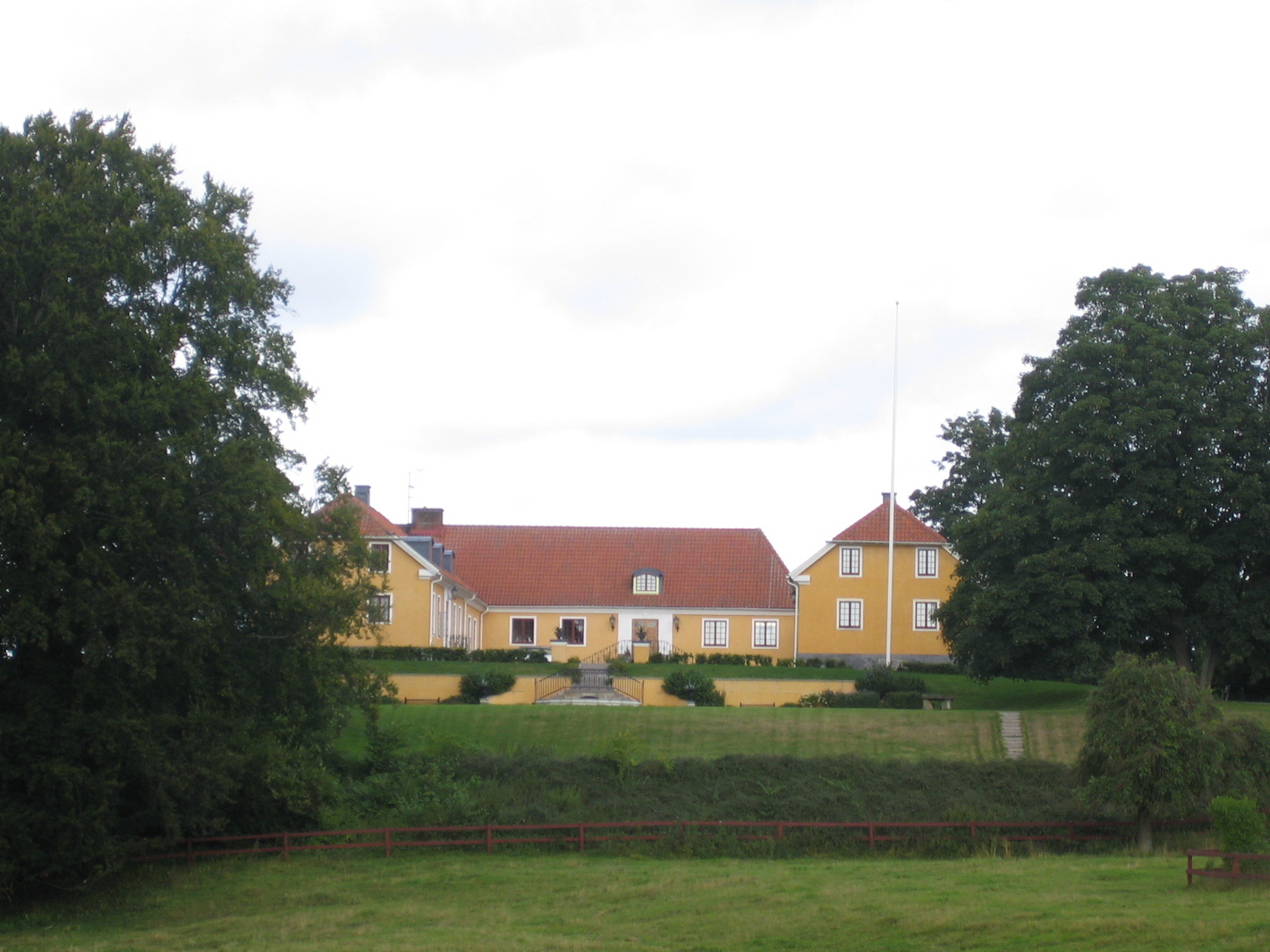
- Näsbyholm Castle

Site information
- Type: Castle
- Open to the public: Unknown

Location
- Scania, Sweden
- Location within Skåne
- Coordinates: 55.468333°N 13.460556°E

Site history
- Built: 1957

Näsbyholm Castle (Swedish: Näsbyholms slott) is a manor at Skurup Municipality Scania, Sweden. Näsbyholm is situated approximately 4 kilometres (2.5 mi) west of Skurup.

== History ==
Näsbyholm was known since the 14th century as a fortified castle that was demolished 1865. After a fire in 1955, the current manor house was erected 1957. In 1994 the east wing was added.

In 1744, the estate was acquired by Danish captain Christian Henrik von Finecke who in 1756 made Näsbyholm a fideicommiss. Näsbyholm was the birthplace and childhood home of the Swedish noblemen and twin brothers; professional hunter Bror von Blixen-Finecke (1886–1946) and equestrian Hans von Blixen-Finecke (1886–1917).

In January 2022 a solar energy park began operations on the grounds of the castle.

== See also ==
- List of castles in Sweden
