= List of German–Danish wars =

List of wars between Germans and Danes

This is a list of German–Danish wars. This list primarily features historically German states such as East Francia (Kingdom of Germany), Teutonic Order, Hanseatic League the Holy Roman Empire, Kingdom of Prussia and Germany since 1871.
Danish victory - 3
German victory - 11
Another result - 3

War	Denmark and allies	Germany and allies	Result
Viking raids in the Rhineland (843–885)	Vikings	Kingdom of Germany	German victory
Siege of Paris (885–886)	Vikings	Kingdom of Germany West Francia	German victory
Rebellion of Harald Bluetooth (974)	Kingdom of Denmark; Kingdom of Norway	Holy Roman Empire; Norwegian Rebels	German victory
Eric the Victorious invasion of the Holy Roman Empire (mid-990s)	Danish Kingdom Sweden	Holy Roman Empire	Stalemate
Dano-German War (1226–1227)	Denmark; Brunswick-Lüneburg	Holstein; Lübeck; Saxony; Bremen; Schwerin; Hamburg	German victory
Danish–Hanseatic War (1361–1370)	Denmark Norway	Hanseatic League; Gotland; Lubeck; Stralsund; Norway; Sweden	German victory
War in Gotland (1403–1404)	Kalmar Union	(State of the Teutonic Order) Teutonic Order; Supported by Visby; Gutes	German victory
Dano-Hanseatic War (1426–1435)	Kalmar Union	Hanseatic League; Hamburg; Lübeck; Lüneburg; Rostock; Stralsund; Wismar; Holstein-Rendsburg; Victual Brothers; Co-belligerent: Sweden (Engelbrekt rebellion); Supported by: Parts of Schleswig	German victory
Italian War of 1542–1546	France; Ottoman Empire: Regency of Algiers; Jülich-Cleves-Berg; Denmark-Norway	Holy Roman Empire; Saxony; Brandenburg; Spain (Kingdom of England) England	Inconclusive
Thirty Years’ War (1618-1648)	Anti-Habsburg alliance prior to 1635 (Note: States that fought against the emperor at some point between 1618 and 1635.): (Kingdom of Bohemia) Bohemia; (Swedish Empire) Sweden; Palatinate; (Duchy of Savoy) Savoy; Dutch Republic; Denmark–Norway; Heilbronn League; Hesse-Kassel; Brandenburg-Prussia; Saxony	Pro-Habsburg alliance prior to 1635: Habsburg Monarchy; (Spain) Spanish Empire; Bavaria; Catholic League	German victory: Imperial army crushes Denmark at the Battle of Lutter
Siege of Hamburg (1686)	Denmark–Norway; Kingdom of France	Swedish Empire; Hamburg; Brandenburg-Prussia; Holy Roman Empire	Inconclusive
War of the Fourth Coalition (1806-1807)	(First French Empire) France: Confederation of the Rhine; (Kingdom of Etruria) Etruria; Holland; (Kingdom of Italy (Napoleonic)) Italy; (Kingdom of Naples) Naples; (Kingdom of Saxony) Saxony (from 11 Dec 1806); (Ragusa (Croatia)) Ragusa; (Duchy of Warsaw) Polish Legions; (Old Swiss Confederacy) Swiss Confederation; Spanish Empire; Ottoman Empire (Duchy of Warsaw) Polish rebels Denmark	Fourth Coalition: (Kingdom of Prussia) Prussia; Russia; United Kingdom; Saxony (until 11 Dec 1806); Sweden; Sicily; Septinsular Republic (from 17th June 1807); Montenegro; Poljica (until 11 June 1807)	Danish victory
War of the Sixth Coalition (1812-1814)	France: Duchy of Warsaw (Note: The Duchy of Warsaw as a state was in effect fully occupied by Russian and Prussian forces by May 1813, although most Poles remained loyal to Napoleon.); Italy; Naples; Napoleonic Spain (Note: Dissolved after the Battle of Vitoria in June 1813); Confederation of the Rhine (Note: Many member states defected after the Battle of Leipzig); Denmark–Norway (1813–1814)	Original coalition: Russia; Prussia; Spain; United Kingdom; Hanover; (Grand Duchy of Mecklenburg-Schwerin) Mecklenburg-Schwerin; Portugal; Sardinia; Sicily; Sweden; After the Armistice of Pläswitz: Austria; Bavaria; After the Battle of Leipzig: (Grand Duchy of Baden) Baden; Saxony; After 20 November 1813: (Sovereign Principality of the United Netherlands) Netherlands; After January 1814: Denmark	German victory
First Schleswig War (1848-1852)	Denmark	German Confederation; Schleswig; Holstein; Prussia; Saxony; Hanover; Mecklenburg-Schwerin	Danish victory
Second Schleswig War (1864)	Denmark	Prussia; Austria	German victory
German invasion of Denmark (1940)	Denmark	Germany	German victory
World War II (1939-1945)	Allies	Axis	Danish victory
