= Gunzelin III of Schwerin =

13th-century European nobleman

Gunzelin III, Count of Schwerin
- Died: after 23 october 1274
- Noble family: Hagen
- Spouse: Margaret of Mecklenburg
- Father: Henry I, Count of Schwerin
- Mother: Audacia

Gunzelin III, Count of Schwerin, also known as Günzel III of Schwerin, (d. after 23 October 1274) was Count of Schwerin from 1228 until his death.

== Life ==
Gunzelin III was the son of Count Henry I and his wife, Audacia. He inherited the County of Schwerin when his father died in 1228. As his was still a minor at the time, his mother acted as his guardian and regent. She ensured that he would hold the county of Schwerin as a feudal fief. After the Battle of Bornhöved (1227), Duke Otto I of Brunswick and Luneburg was held captive in Schwerin. As a condition for his release, he had to confirm Gunzelin III as the holder of the fiefs Schwerin held from Brunswick. During this period, all feudal transactions of the County were sealed by both Gunzelin and his mother. On 1 November 1246, they jointly founded Zarrentin Abbey and donated some land to it.

On 30 October 1230, Gunzelin III was engaged to Princess Margaret of Mecklenburg and Lord John I, who had just come of age, was appointed co-guardian.

On 21 November 1267, Gunzelin was elected patron of the Archbishopric of Riga. During his visit to Riga, he probably also visited the monastery at Daugavgrīva, to which he had donated some land in the village of Siggelkow in 1235.

Gunzelin III died in 1274. After his death, his sons Helmold III and Niklot I divided their inheritance. His older son Helmod III received Schwerin, Neustadt and Marnitz and founded the Schwerin-Schwerin. His youngest son Niklot I received Boizenburg, Wittenburg and Crivitz and founded the Schwerin-Wittenburg line.

=== Marriage and issue ===
In 1241 in Mecklenburg, Gunzelin III married a member of the House of Nikloting – Margaret, the daughter of Henry Borwin II. Gunzelin and Margaret had six children:

- Henry II
- Helmold III
- Gunzelin, a canon in Schwerin, and Lord of Daber and Neu-Schwerin
- John (d. 1300), also a canon at Schwerin, and later Bishop of Riga
- Matilda, married Abel, the son of King Abel of Denmark, and secondly John of Wittenberg
- Niklot I

Gunzelin III of Schwerin House of Schwerin Died: after 23 October 1274
Preceded by Henry I	Count of Schwerin	Succeeded by Helmold III as Count of Schwerin-Wittenburg
Preceded by Henry I	Count of Schwerin	Succeeded by Niklot I as Count of Schwerin-Schwerin
