= John III of Mecklenburg =

John III, Lord of Mecklenburg
- Born: after 1266
- Died: 27 May 1289; Poel
- Buried: Franciscan monastery in Wismar
- Noble family: House of Mecklenburg
- Spouse: Helena of Rügen
- Father: Henry I, Lord of Mecklenburg
- Mother: Anastasia of Pomerania

John III, Lord of Mecklenburg (after 1266 – 27 May 1289 at Poel) was co-ruler of Mecklenburg from 1287 until his death. He was the son of Henry I and his wife Anastasia of Pomerania. From 1287 to 1289, he ruled Mecklenburg jointly with his elder brother Henry II, under the regency of their uncle Nicholas III.

John III drowned off the island of Poel on 27 May 1289 and was buried in the Franciscan monastery in Wismar.

== Marriage and issue ==
On 3 November 1288, he married Helena (d. 9 August 1315), the daughter of Wizlaw II, Prince of Rügen. John and Helena had one daughter:

- Luitgard (c. 1289 – 1352), married in 1302 to Count Gerhard II of Hoya

== See also ==
- List of dukes and grand dukes of Mecklenburg
