= Gerhard IV of Holstein-Plön =

Count Holstein-Plön

Gerhard IV, Count of Holstein-Plön
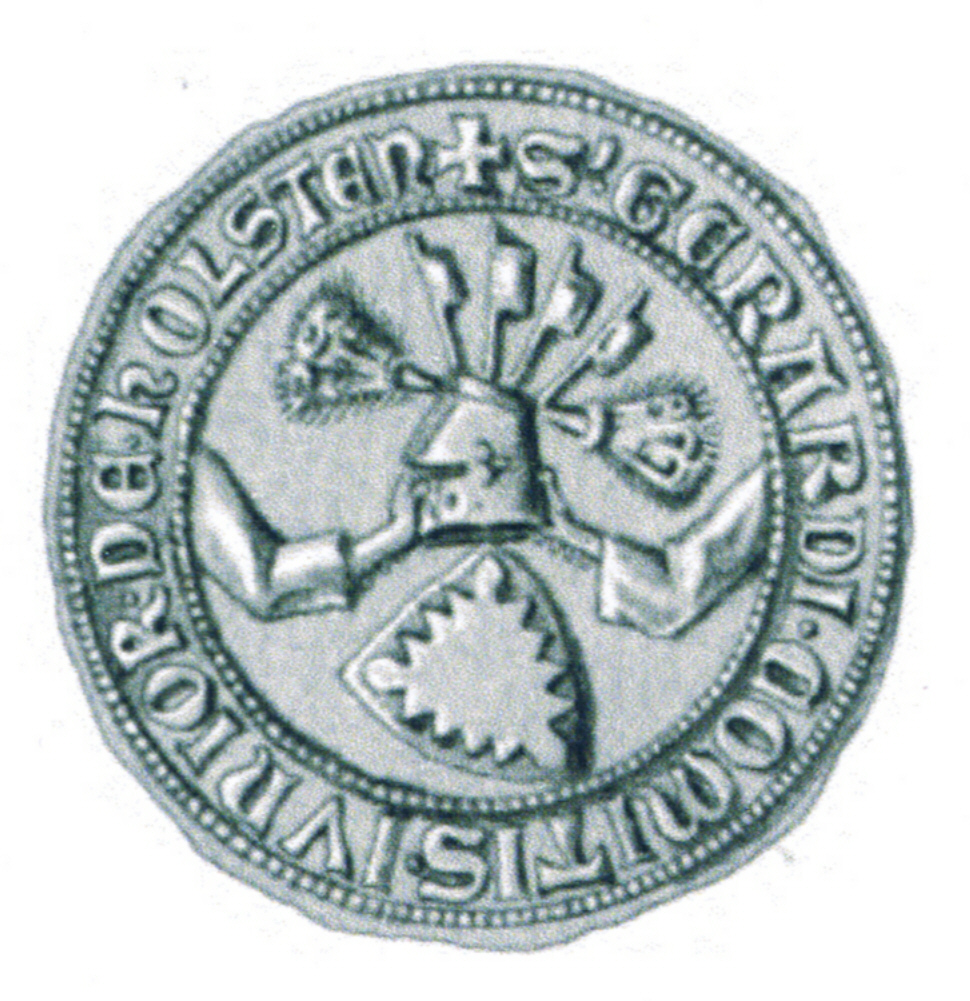
- Seal of Gerhard IV as Count of Holstein-Ploen, c. 1312-1314
- Born: c. 1277
- Died: 1323 (aged 45–46)
- Noble family: House of Schauenburg
- Spouse: Anastasia of Schwerin
- Father: Gerhard II, Count of Holstein-Plön
- Mother: Ingeborg of Sweden

Gerhard IV (c. 1277 – 1323) was Count of Holstein-Plön from 1312 until his death in 1323.

== Life ==
Gerhard was the eldest son of Gerhard II and Ingeborg of Sweden. He inherited Holstein-Plön; on 7 June 1314, he sold most of his inheritance to his brother John III.

== Marriage and issue ==
He married on 30 July 1313 to Anastasia of Schwerin (c. 1291 – after 1316), daughter of Nicholas I of Schwerin, and had two children with her:

- Gerhard V of Holstein-Plön (c. 1315 – 22 September 1350), canon at Lübeck Cathedral, potential future Count of Holstein-Plön until his early death.
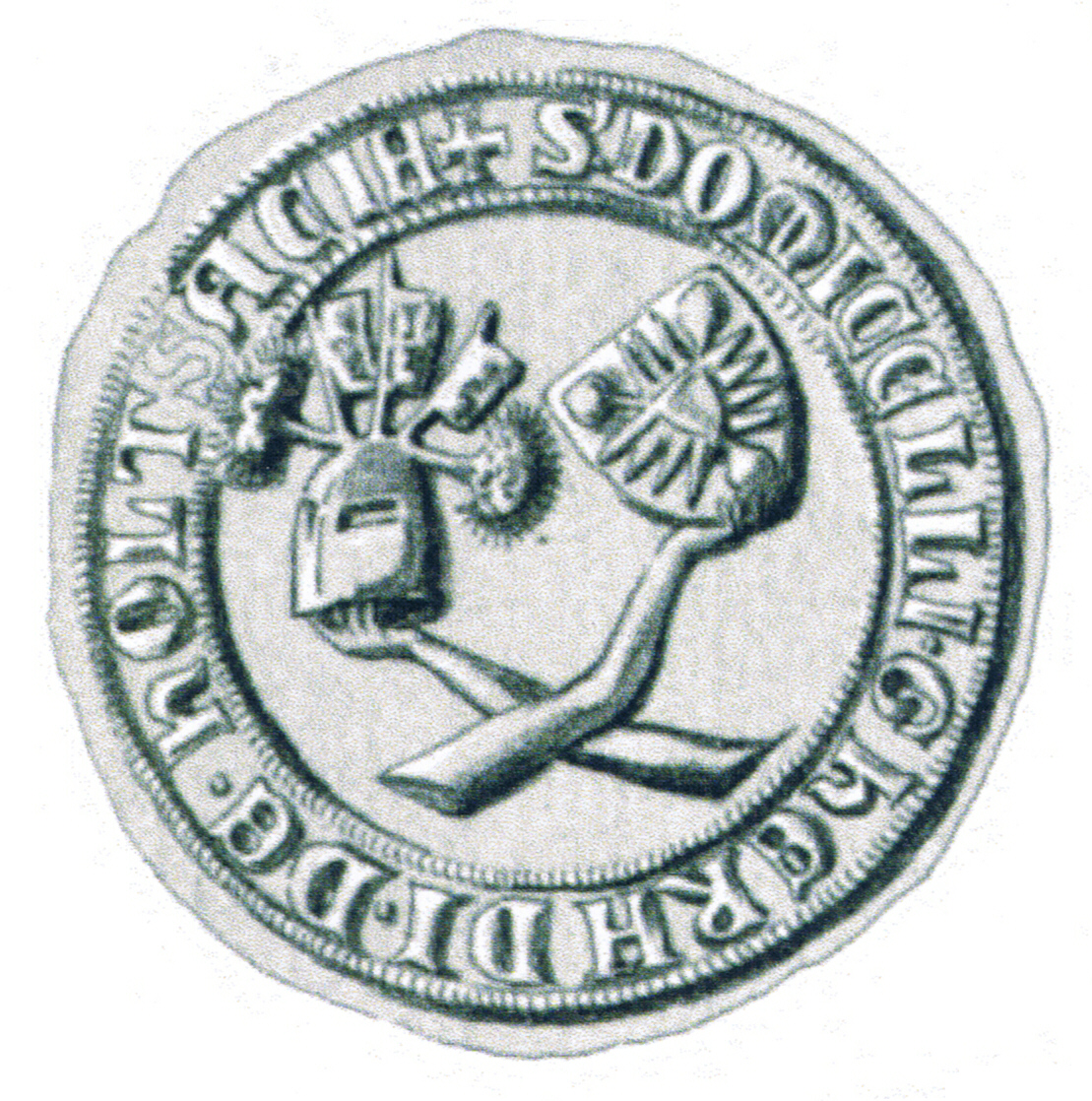
Seal of Gerhard V

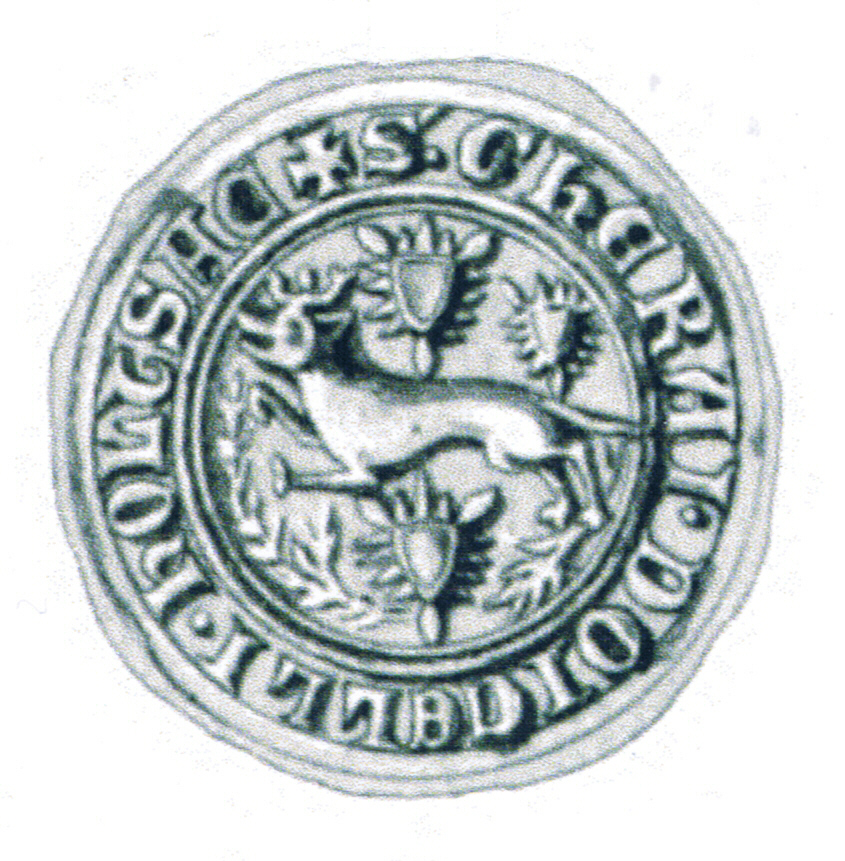
Seal of Gerhard V

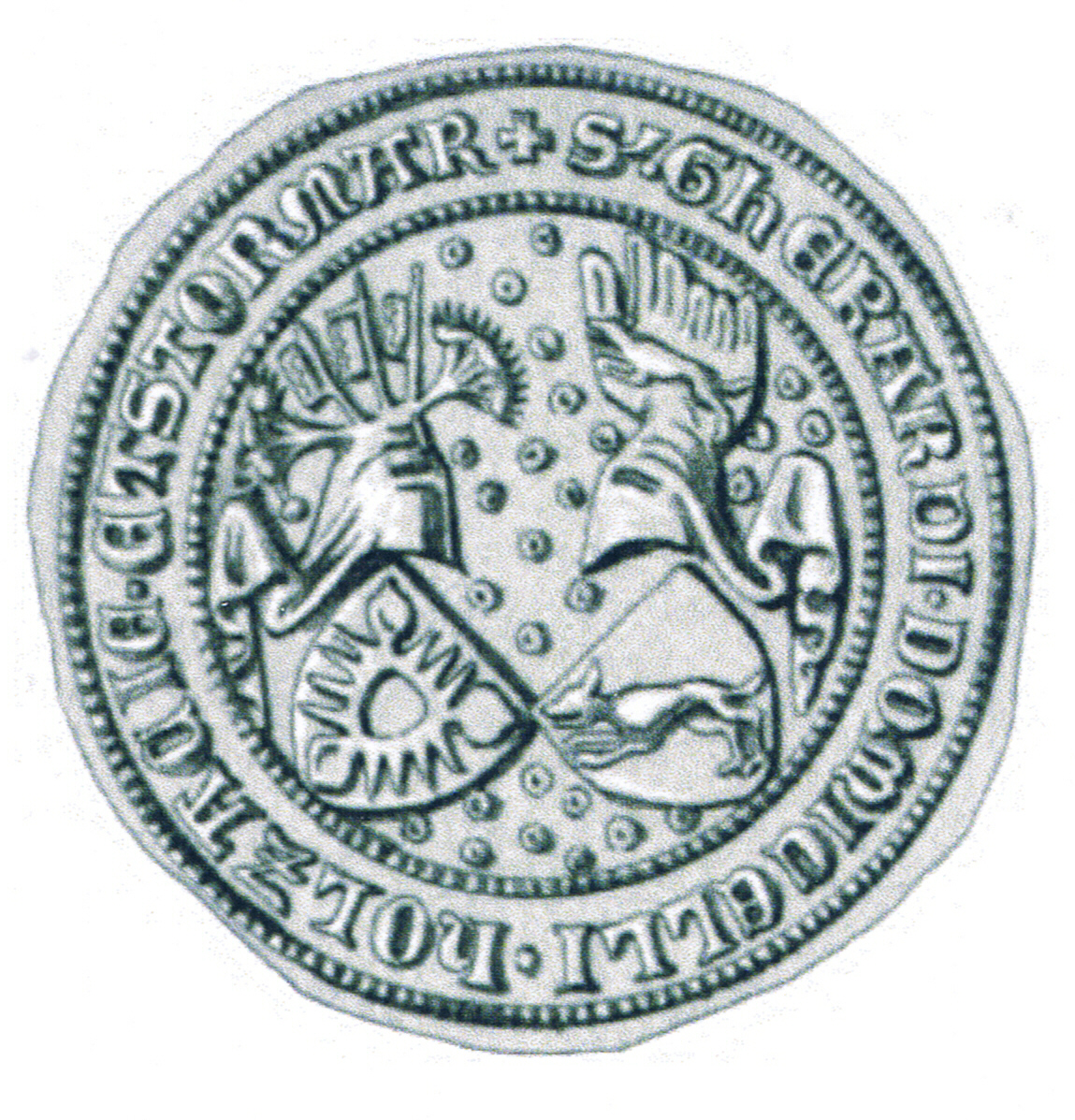
Seal of Gerhard V
- Ingeborg (c. 1316 – after 1349), married to Count Conrad I Oldenburg; they were parents of Christian V, Count of Oldenburg

== Seals ==
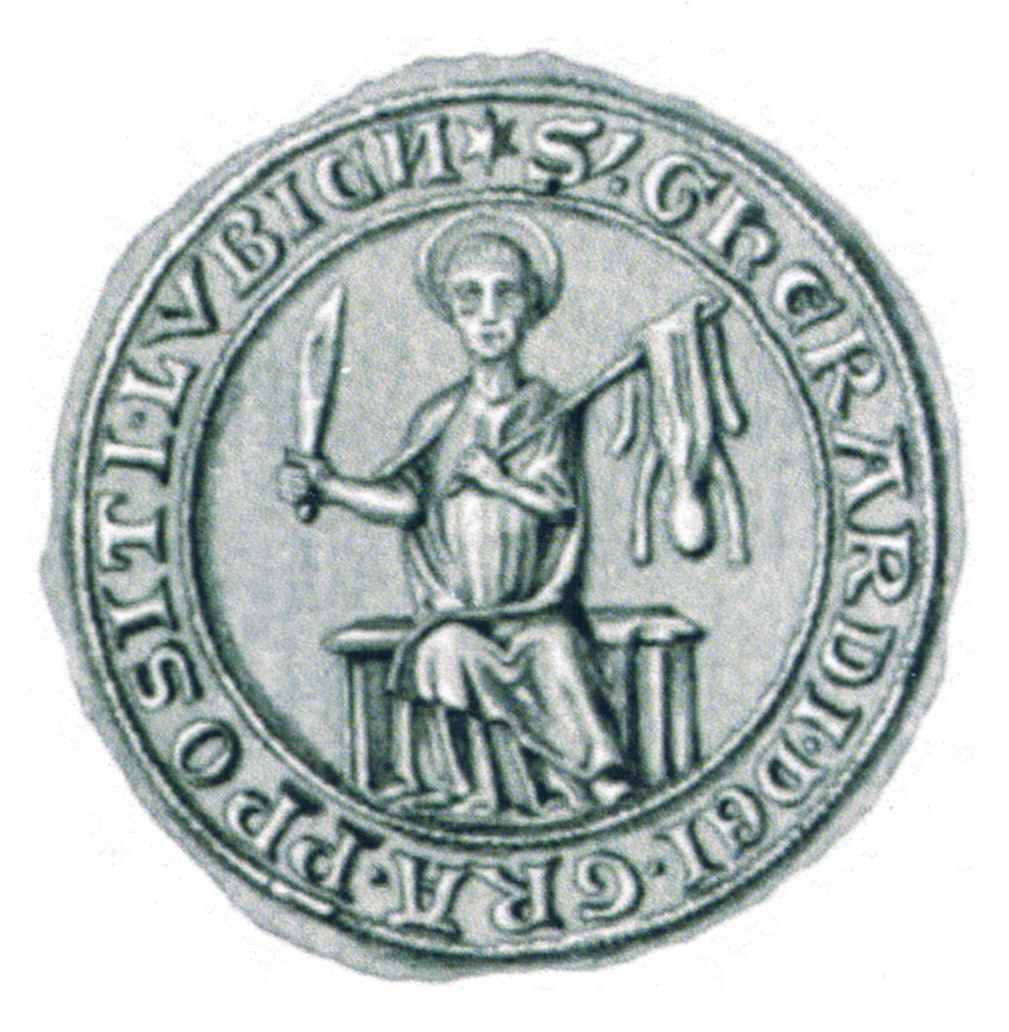
Seal of Gerhard IV as Provost of Luebeck, c. 1302-1304

An early seal from his time as Provost of Lübeck reads:
S (IGILLUM) * DEI * GRA * GHERARDI (TIA) * P (RAE) POSITION (U.S.) * LUBIC (E) N (SIS)
"Seal of Gerhard, provost of Lübeck by the grace of God"

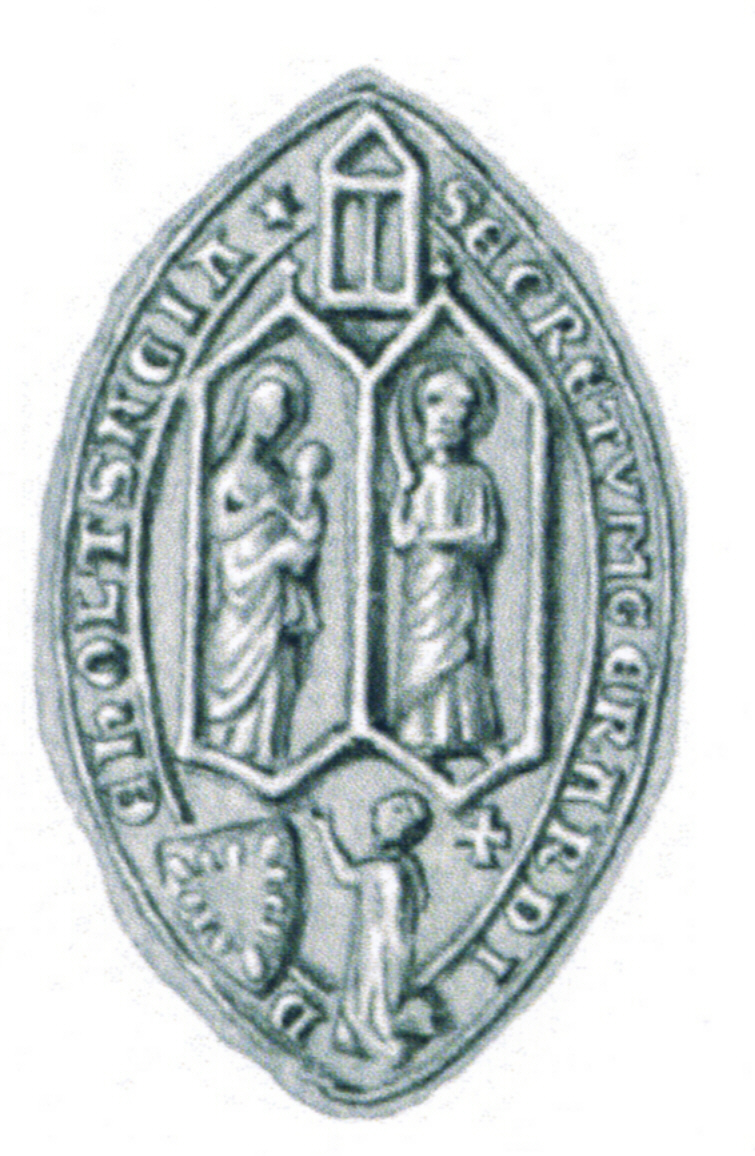
Seal of Gerhard IV

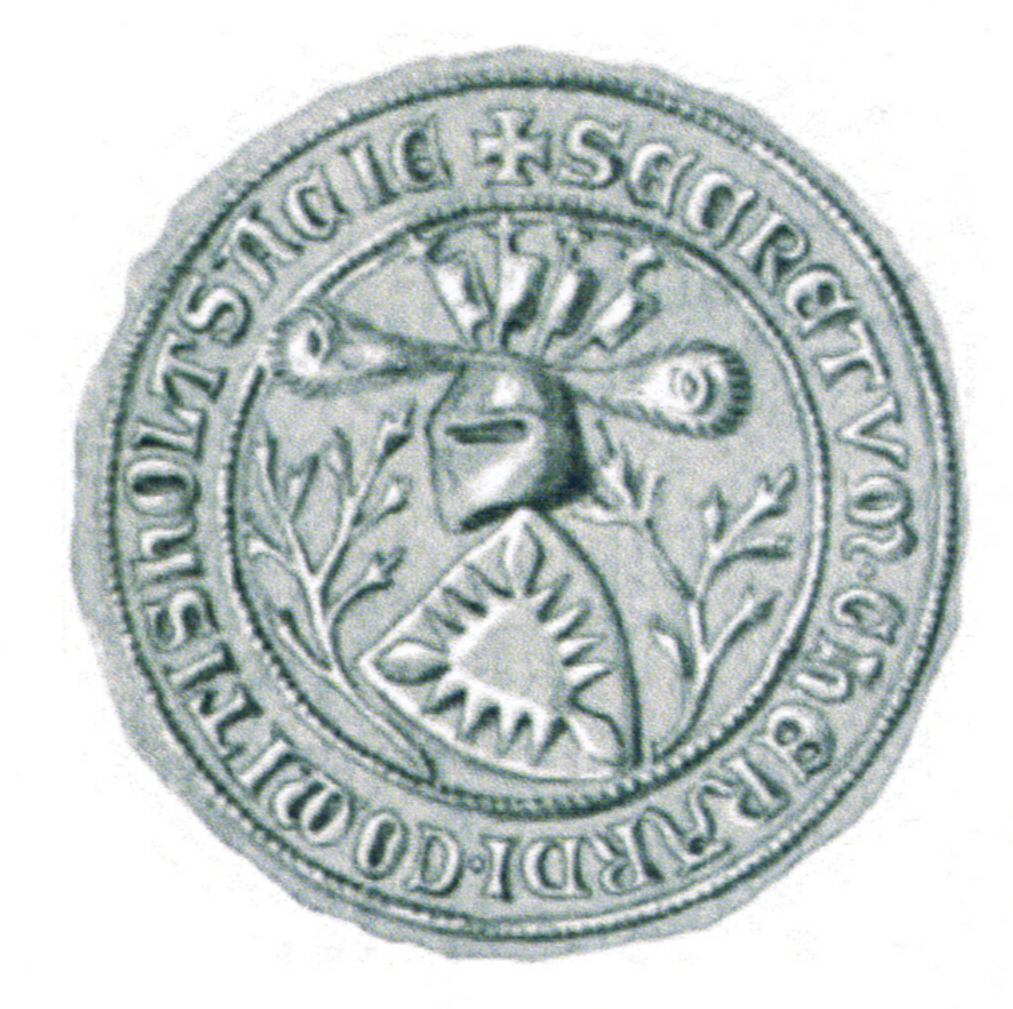
Seal of Gerhard IV

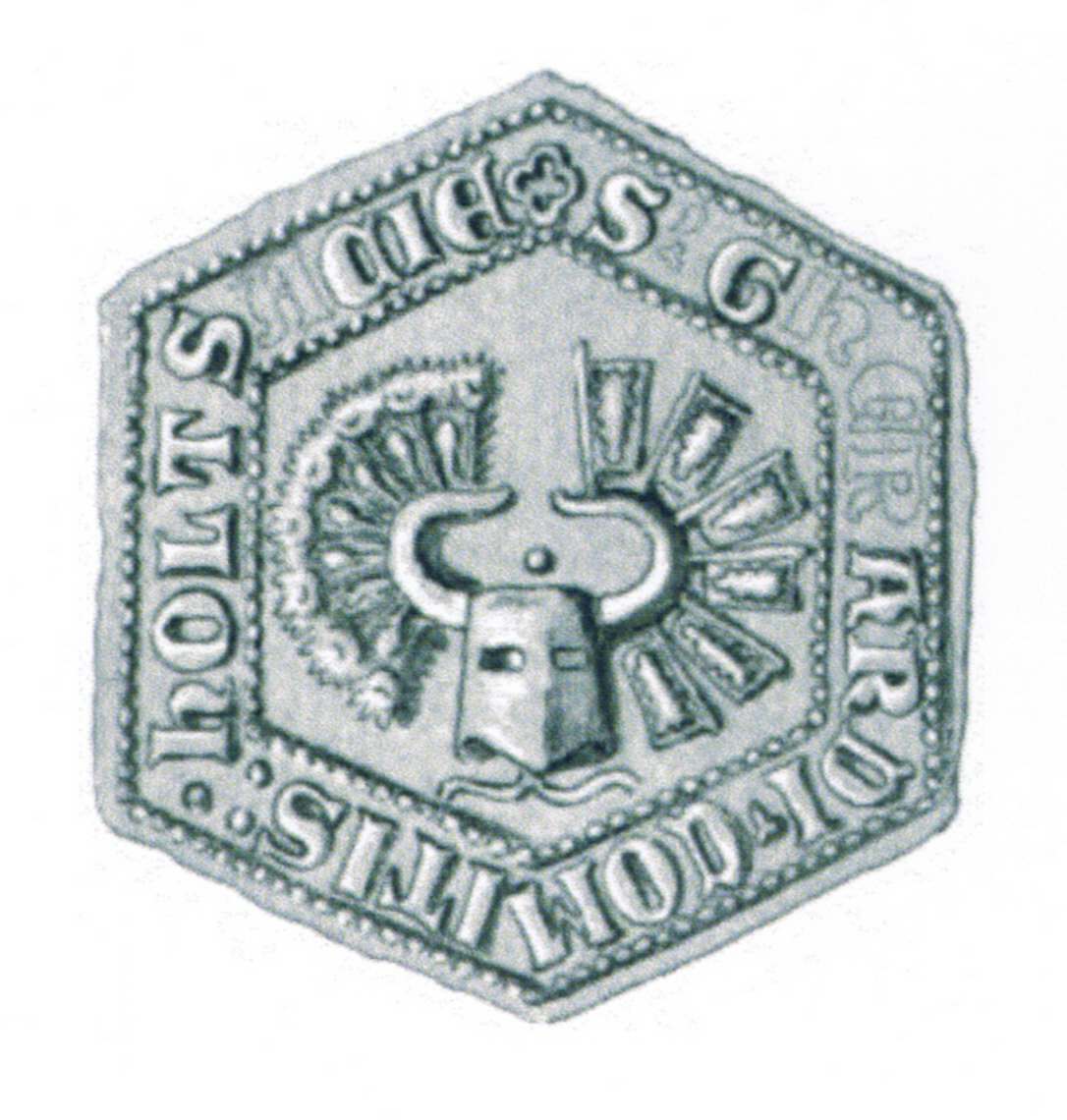
Seal of Gerhard IV

== Ancestors ==
Ancestors of Gerhard IV of Holstein-Plön

Adolf IV of Holstein (1205-1261); Count of Schauenburg and Holstein
Gerhard I, Count of Holstein-Itzehoe (1232-1290); Count of Holstein-Itzehoe
Heilwig of Lippe
Gerhard II, Count of Holstein-Plön (1254-1312); Count of Holstein-Plön
John I, Lord of Mecklenburg
Elizabeth of Mecklenburg
Luitgart of Henneberg
Gerhard IV, Count of Holstein-Plön (1277-1323); Count of Holstein-Plön
Birger Jarl (1210-1266)
Valdemar, King of Sweden (1243-1302); King of Sweden
Ingeborg Eriksdotter of Sweden
Ingeborg of Sweden (d. 1290)
Eric IV of Denmark (1216-1250); King of Denmark
Sophia of Denmark
Jutta of Saxony

Gerhard IV of Holstein-Plön House of Schauenburg Born: 1277 Died: 1323
Preceded by Gerhard II	Count of Holstein-Plön; 1312-1323 with John III the Mild (1312-1316)	Succeeded by Gerhard V
