= John II of Mecklenburg =

John II, Lord of Mecklenburg
- Born: c. 1250
- Died: 12 October 1299
- Buried: Doberan Minster
- Noble family: House of Mecklenburg
- Father: John I, Lord of Mecklenburg
- Mother: Luitgard of Henneberg

John II of Mecklenburg (c. 1250 – 12 October 1299) was from 1264 until his death Lord of Mecklenburg.

He was the youngest son of John I and Luitgard of Henneberg (1210-1267), the daughter of Count Poppo VII of Henneberg. After his brother Henry I was taken prisoner during his pilgrimage, he took over the regency of Mecklenburg and the guardianship of Henry's sons in 1275, along with his brother Nicholas III.

In 1283 he was then referred to as Lord of Gadebusch. He probably received Gadebush as an apanage.

He died on 12 October 1299 and was buried in the Doberan Minster.

Three of his children have been documented:

- Lütgard, died after 2 August 1353
- John, died young
- Elizabeth, died after 1352, abbess of Rehna Abbey
