= Dano-German War (1226–1227) =

Dano–German War (1226–1227)
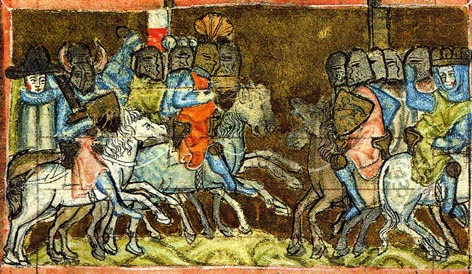
- Battle of Bornhöved (1227), illustrated in the 14th century
| Date | 1226–1227 |
| Location | Northern Germany |
| Result | German victory |
| Territorial changes | All Danish territory - other than the Principality of Rügen - above the Elbe and below the Eider gained independence |

Belligerents
| Denmark; Brunswick-Lüneburg | Holstein; Lübeck; Saxony; Bremen; Schwerin; Hamburg |

Commanders and leaders
| Valdemar II; Otto I (POW) | Adolf VI; Henry I Albrecht I |

Strength
| Unknown, but probably a couple thousand | Unknown, but probably a couple thousand |

Casualties and losses
| Heavy | Unknown |

The Dano–German War (1226–1227), was an attempt by Valdemar II of Denmark to reconquer his lost German territories, which he had lost after the negotiations of his release from captivity by Henry I, Count of Schwerin. The war was short-lived though, and there was only one major battle, the Battle of Bornhöved (1227). Valdemar was aided by his nephew Otto I, Duke of Brunswick-Lüneburg against a coalition of multiple German states, consisting of Holstein, Lübeck, Saxony, Schwerin, Bremen and Hamburg.

== Background ==
In 1223, the Danish King Valdemar II of Denmark was captured by Henry I, Count of Schwerin after tensions between them. The Danish king had a few years before that, taken half the land of count Henry and given it to loyal supporters, through his grandson's inheritance, as well as allegedly, seduced or raped his wife.

The captivity was of interest of several notable Baltic players; most notably Frederick II, Holy Roman Emperor, but also Hermann von Salza and of course it was amazing for all the German dukes and princes who had previously been subjugated by Valdemar, or some who felt they would be soon. But the captivity was also view in great distaste by Pope Honorius III who was on extremely good terms with the Danish realm and king, a trend between popes that had been active for a long time, ever since the establishment of the Danish archiepiscopal see in Lund in 1103, since the Danish kings had more or less become loyal allies to the papacy.

Frederick II, Holy Roman Emperor had, in 1214, been forced to cede all territories above the Elbe river to Valdemar II of Denmark. He needed Valdemar to stay neutral in imperial affairs at that point, most notably his crowning as king of the Romans in Aachen in 1215. Valdemar had stopped supporting his previous ally Otto IV, Holy Roman Emperor - political rival to Frederick - right before the Battle of Bouvines. This weakened Otto's military capacity significantly by preventing his vassals in northern Germany from participating in the battle as they were occupied with defending themselves against Valdemar. The loss at the battle weakened Otto both politically and militarily. Frederick, as a thanks, issued the golden bull. Another reason, though more minor, is that Frederick wished to embark on a joint crusade with the Danish king with, of course, Frederick being the lead of it. He also wished to bring Denmark back in the empire, as it had been previously until Cnut VI's refusal of subjugation from Frederick Barbarossa.

Hermann von Salza tried several different times to interfere with the negotiations, and for one sole reason: He wanted Valdemar to go on a crusade to the holy land. Valdemar had already a few years prior taken the cross and swore he would embark on a crusade to the holy land when the next general crusade would happen. He would embark with 100 ships, and winter in Spain and spend two whole years in the holy land. Valdemar agreed to this, but when the Danish magnates met at the River Elbe to buy the king's freedom in 1224 but flatly refused the promises made by Valdemar to go on a crusade, as well as the other terms negotiated, and left angrily, without a deal having been struck. The Danish magnates instead began negotiating with Henry directly, without the intervention of the emperor of Hermann.

The reaction from Pope Honorius III could best be described as pure outrage. The pope had long had great plans for Valdemar, he wanted, alike with Hermann and Frederick himself, for Valdemar to go on a massive crusade with Frederick to take back the holy land. However, in general, the many disputes with Frederick made Honorious greatly appreciate his northern ally. Immediately when Valdemar was caught, Pope Honorious wrote many letters to Henry warning him and trying to convince him to free Valdemar, even going as far as warning him if he did not immediately free Valdemar and his son, Henry would be excommunicated. Honorious numerous attempts of freeing Valdemar ultimately however, did not work.

The negotiations were long, and Valdemar's nephew, Albert of Orlamünde, with the help of Otto I, Duke of Brunswick-Lüneburg - whom the nobles of Denmark had already declared temporary regent of Denmark until Valdemar returned - in 1225 tried to settle the problem with military force, but he was defeated in Möln in 1225. Albert was taken prisoner, and the nobles were only able to recover Valdemar by negotiations afterward. The defeat also started a desertion of the German possessions away from the Danish crown, the exiled schauenmbergs returned to Holstein, and only Rendsburg in Holstein stayed in Danish hands.

An agreement was finally reached on the 17 November 1225. The Eider River would function as the border between Schleswig and Holstein, and Valdemar would give up all territory south of this border, including Rendsberg. Only Rügen and Fehmern could be kept by the Danish king. The Danes also promised to not help Albert of Örlamunde. The Danish king was also to pay a sum of 44,000 silver marks in three parts until 1227. The cities of Lübeck and Hamburg, as well as all other German traders from Holstein, were to be allowed to trade in Denmark, as had hitherto been the case.

Valdemar was finally released on 25 December 1225, and his son followed on the 19 April 1226 after having paid an additional 18,000 silver marks and 100 richly equipped horses. Naturally, king Valdemar was not willingly to give up his precious Baltic possessions that easily. He asked Honorious to free him from his promises, on the basis that they had been made unwillingly and under severe pressure. So in 1226, it was time for war.

== War ==
Valdemar's initial opponents in the war were Adolf IV of Holstein and Henry I, Count of Schwerin however they couldn't expect a lot of imperial support, other than the Duchy of Saxony which would join later. Not even Brandenburg supported them, which could be taken as a sign of Valdemar's diplomacy: since he had taken advantage of the young margrave's relationship to their brother in law Otto I, Duke of Brunswick-Lüneburg, who was Valdemar's nephew as well. In exchange for their loyalty, he had given up land in Pomerania.

In the autumn of 1226, the Danish king Valdemar II crossed the Eider River in an attempt to reclaim his lost territories. He advanced into Holstein and seized Ditmarschen in 1227. However, the tides of war soon turned. On 22 July 1227, the Danish royal army, supported by troops led by another of the king’s nephews, Otto of Lüneburg, suffered a crushing defeat at the hands of a coalition of German forces at the Battle of Bornhöved. The Valdemar II managed to escape, while Otto was taken prisoner. The battlefield, strewn with thousands of bodies, marked the collapse of the Danish "empire".

== Aftermath ==
After the defeat at Bornhöved, King Valdemar abandoned his larger military ambitions to reclaim the North German territories and instead adopted a more peaceful, consolidation-focused policy. Lack of resources and support from the Danish Church and aristocracy prevented further wars.
