= Albert I =

Albert I may refer to:

== People ==
=== Born before 1300 ===
- Albert I, Count of Vermandois (917–987)
- Albert I, Count of Namur (c. 950–1011)
- Albert I of Moha
- Albert I of Brandenburg (c. 1100–1170), first margrave of Brandenburg
- Albert I, Margrave of Meissen (1158–1195)
- Albert I of Käfernburg (c. 1170–1232), Archbishop of Magdeburg
- Albert I of Pietengau (c. 1215–1260)
- Albert I, Lord of Mecklenburg (after 1230–1265)
- Albert I, Duke of Brunswick-Lüneburg (1236–1279), second duke of Brunswick-Lüneburg
- Albert I of Germany (1255–1308), king of Germany and archduke of Austria
- Albert I, Prince of Anhalt-Zerbst (c. 1258–1316)

=== Born after 1300 ===
- Albert I, Duke of Bavaria (1336–1404), duke of Bavaria-Straubing, count of Holland, Hainault and Zealand
- Albert I, Duke of Mecklenburg-Stargard
- Albert I, Duke of Brunswick-Grubenhagen (c. 1339–1383)
- Albert I, Duke of Münsterberg-Oels (1468–1511)
- Albert I, Duke of Prussia (1490–1568), first Duke of Prussia
- Albert I, Prince of Monaco (1848–1922)
- Albert I of Belgium (1875–1934), king of the Belgians
- Albert I Kalonji Ditunga (1929–2015), Congolese politician

== Other uses ==
- Albert I (monkey), the first mammal used in a subspace rocket launch, June 11, 1948

== See also ==
- Albert (given name)
