= Henry I of Mecklenburg =

Lord of Mecklenburg (c. 1230-1302)

Henry I, Lord of Mecklenburg
- Mecklenburg coats of arms
- Born: c. 1230
- Died: 2 January 1302
- Buried: Doberan Minster
- Noble family: House of Mecklenburg
- Spouse: Anastasia of Pomerania
- Issue: Ludgarda of Mecklenburg; Henry II, Lord of Mecklenburg; John III, Lord of Mecklenburg
- Father: John I, Lord of Mecklenburg
- Mother: Luitgart of Henneberg

Henry I, Lord of Mecklenburg (nicknamed the Pilgrim, c. 1230 – 2 January 1302) ruled Mecklenburg from 1264 to 1275 and from 1299 until his death.

== Background ==
He was the eldest son of Lord John I. After his father's death, he at first ruled jointly with his brother Albert I. After Albert died in 1265, John ruled alone. Around 1259 he married Anastasia (c. 1245 – 15 March 1317), the daughter of Duke Barnim I of Pomerania.

== Life ==
From 1266 onwards, he required the Jews in Wismar to pay protection money. In the same year, he started the "bread and wine donation" programme, in which 20 churches in the Ilow area would be supplied with communion wine and wafers by the City Hall in Wismar. For many churches in the area, this decree is the first time they are mentioned in a document. In 1270, he undertook a crusade against Lithuania, which had not been Christianized at the time.

In 1271, he made a pilgrimage to the Holy Land. This pilgrimage is considered a Crusade according to Thomas Fuller in his Historie of the Holy Warre. Along the way, Henry was taken prisoner and deported to Cairo, where he was held in captivity by the Mamluks for 27 years. During his absence, Mecklenburg was ruled by his brothers John II and Nicholas III, after a fight between his brothers and cousins about the regency and the guardianship of his children. After John II died in 1283, Nicholas III ruled alone, until Henry II came of age in 1290.

Henry I returned to Mecklenburg via Morea and Rome in 1298. In 1299, he formally resumed his reign, although he probably left the business of government mostly to his son Henry II.

Henry I died in 1302 and was buried in the ducal crypt in the Doberan Minster.

== Issue ==
- Ludgarda (ca. 1260-1261 - bef. 14 December 1283), wife of Przemysł II of Greater Poland.
- Henry II "the Lion" (ca. 1267 - 1329).
- John III (ca. 1266 - 1289).

== Footnotes ==
Henry I of Mecklenburg House of Mecklenburg Born: c. 1230 Died: 2 January 1302
Preceded by John I	Lord of Mecklenburg; 1264-1275 and 1299-1302	Succeeded by Henry II
