= Ludgarda (wife of Przemysł II) =

Duchess consort of Poznań
- Tenure: 1273–1283
- Predecessor: Elisabeth of Wrocław
- Successor: Rikissa of Sweden

Duchess consort of Greater Poland
- Tenure: 1279–1283
- Predecessor: Jolenta-Helena of Hungary
- Successor: Rikissa of Sweden
- Born: c. 1260
- Died: c. 1283 (aged 22–23)
- Burial: Cathedral of Gniezno
- Spouse: Przemysł II
- House: House of Mecklenburg (by birth); House of Piast (by marriage)
- Father: Henry I the Pilgrim, Lord of Mecklenburg
- Mother: Anastasia of Pomerania

Ludgarda (c. 1260/61 – bef. 14 December 1283), was a German noblewoman of the House of Mecklenburg, and by marriage Duchess consort of Poznań during 1273–1283 and of all Greater Poland during 1279–1283.

She was the eldest child and only daughter of Henry I the Pilgrim, Lord of Mecklenburg by his wife Anastasia, daughter of Barnim I, Duke of Pomerania. She was probably named after her paternal grandmother, Luitgard of Henneberg.

== Life ==
The alliance between Dukes Bolesław the Pious of Greater Poland and Barnim I of Pomerania was sealed with the marriage between Przemysł II, Bolesław's nephew, and Ludgarda, Barnim I's granddaughter. The wedding ceremony was performed in the city of Szczecin, in 1273.

After a happy beginning, the relationship between the couple became more complicated due to Ludgarda's apparent infertility after almost ten years of marriage. They may have been separated shortly before her death.

Ludgarda died suddenly in Gniezno, and was buried in the local cathedral on 14 December 1283, probably a few days after her death.

According to Jan Długosz and other contemporary sources, she was strangled by order of her husband, after her refusal of a divorce and return to Mecklenburg. However, modern historiography suggests the innocence of Przemysł II.
