= Nicholas III of Mecklenburg =

Nicholas III, Lord of Mecklenburg
- Born: after 1230
- Died: 8 June 1289 or 1290
- Buried: Doberan Minster
- Noble family: House of Mecklenburg
- Father: John I, Lord of Mecklenburg
- Mother: Luitgard of Henneberg

Nicholas III, Lord of Mecklenburg (after 1230 – 8 June 1289 or 1290) was from 1264 to 1289 Lord of Mecklenburg.

He was the son of John I and his wife, Luitgard of Henneberg (1210-1267), the daughter of Count Poppo VII of Henneberg. On 9 January 1266, he was appointed canon of Lübeck Cathedral. In 1269 he was also a priest in the St. Mary's Church in Wismar.

When Henry I was taken prisoner during a pilgrimage to the Holy Land, Nicholas III and his brother John II took up the regency for Henry's underage sons. He is last mentioned as living in a document dated 2 April 1289.

He died on 8 June 1289 or 1290 and was buried in Doberan Minster.

== See also ==
- List of dukes and grand dukes of Mecklenburg

== Sources ==
- Wigger, Friedrich (1885). "Stammtafeln des Großherzoglichen Hauses von Meklenburg". Jahrbücher des Vereins für Mecklenburgische Geschichte und Altertumskunde. 50: 111–326.
