= Gunzelin of Schwerin =

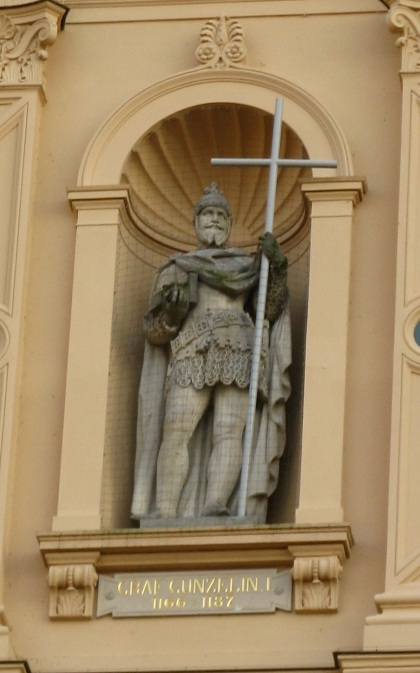
Statue of Gunzelin at Schwerin Castle

Gunzelin von Hagen, or Gunzelin I (b. between 1125 and 1130; d. June 18, 1185), was the first Count of Schwerin after the conquest of the Obotrites by Henry the Lion, ruling from 1167 to his death. The county remained in the possession of Gunzelin's heirs for 191 years, until Nicholas I, Count of Tecklenburg sold it to Albert II, Duke of Mecklenburg in 1358.

== Life ==
Gunzelin aided Henry the Lion in his campaign against the Obotrites. After Gunzelin distinguished himself in this campaign, Henry installed him as Burgrave of the castles of Schwerin and Ilow.

In 1164, Gunzelin defended the castles of Ilow and Schwerin against the army of Pribislaw. He participated in the Battle of Verchen during this campaign. When the Obotrite lands were restored to Pribislaw in 1167 as a vassal of Duke Henry, Schwerin and a large surrounding area were separated and retained by Gunzelin as Count.

The Christianization of the newly conquered lands was accomplished by Bishop Berno under Gunzelin's protection. Gunzelin restricted the rights of the Slavic population in the County of Schwerin, and brought settlers from Germany into his new lands.

Gunzelin seems to have been a true friend of Duke Henry. In 1172, he accompanied Henry on a pilgrimage to Jerusalem. Gunzelin supported Henry in his war against Emperor Frederick Barbarossa from 1180 to 1181, after which most of Henry's lands were stripped from him. Gunzelin opposed his new overlord, Bernhard, who had been appointed Duke of Saxony by the Emperor after Henry's dispossession.

Gunzelin died on June 18, 1185, and was buried in Schwerin Cathedral. Gunzelin's sons Helmold, Gunzelin, and Henry all ruled as Count of Schwerin, with Gunzelin II and Henry ruling jointly. His son Hermann was a rival claimant to Brunward, the second Bishop of Schwerin. His youngest son Frederick succeeded Brunward as the third Bishop of Schwerin.
