= Albert I of Mecklenburg =

Albert I, Lord of Mecklenburg
- Born: after 1230
- Died: 15 or 17 May 1265
- Buried: Doberan Minster
- Noble family: House of Mecklenburg
- Father: John I, Lord of Mecklenburg
- Mother: Liutgart of Henneberg

Albert I, Lord of Mecklenburg (after 1230 – 15 or 17 May 1265) was briefly co-ruler of Mecklenburg from 1264 to 1265.

He was a son of John I and his wife, Luitgard of Henneberg (1210-1267), a daughter of Count Poppo VII of Henneberg. He ruled jointly with his brother Henry I. He may have married a daughter of Nicholas I of Werle, but no record of such a marriage, or any children, has survived.

Albert I died in 1265 and was buried in the Doberan Minster.

== See also ==
- List of dukes and grand dukes of Mecklenburg

== Sources ==
- Wigger, Friedrich (1885). "Stammtafeln des Großherzoglichen Hauses von Meklenburg". Jahrbücher des Vereins für Mecklenburgische Geschichte und Altertumskunde. 50: 111–326.
