= Henry I of Schwerin =

German nobleman

Henry I, Count of Schwerin
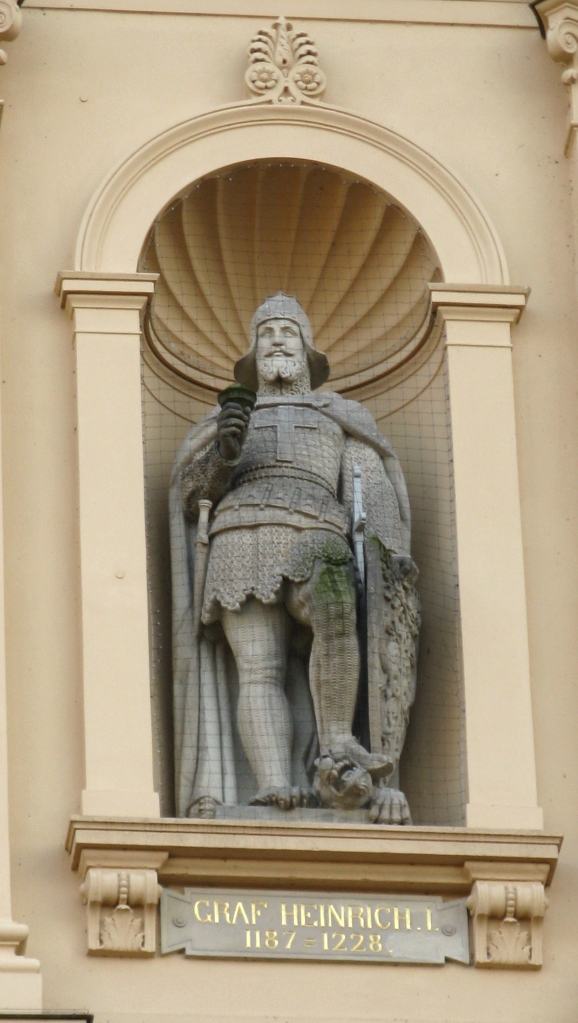
- Statue of Henry, part of the façade of Schwerin Castle
- Born: c. 1155
- Died: 17 February 1228
- Buried: Schwerin Cathedral
- Noble family: House of Hagen
- Spouse: Audacia of Pomerania-Schlawe
- Father: Gunzelin I, Count of Schwerin

Henry I, Count of Schwerin (c. 1155 – 17 February 1228), also known as Henry the Black, was a German nobleman. He was a ruling Count of Schwerin and played an important role in the ending of the Danish supremacy in the southern coast of the Baltic Sea.

== Life ==
Henry was the fourth son of Gunzelin I, who had been invested with the County of Schwerin by Henry the Lion. In 1185, his father died and his eldest brother Helmold I inherited the county. In 1194, Helmold abdicated, and power was shared by Henry and his elder brother Gunzelin II.

After the fall of Henry the Lion, Denmark gained supremacy in Northern Germany and on the southern coast of the Baltic Sea. The Kings of Denmark gradually expanded their influence southwards. In 1208, when the brothers had a dispute with one of their vassals, King Valdemar II of Denmark used this as an excuse to seize their territory. In 1214, they were allowed to return, provided they recognized Valdemar II as their liege lord. Valdemar II also decided that sister Oda should marry his illegitimate son Niels, Count of Halland. Half of the territory of Schwerin was given to Niels as his dowry.

In 1221 while Henry I was away participating in the Fifth Crusade, both his brother Gunzelin II and his brother-in-law Nicholas died. Valdemar II took up the guardianship of his grandson Niels, Count of Northern Halland and appointed his nephew Albert II, Count of Weimar-Orlamünde as governor. In a deed dated 28 February, he confirmed his grandson's ownership of half of Schwerin. Henry returned from his crusade in 1223. He negotiated with Valdemar II about a return of his possessions, but nothing came of it and Henry I decided to take drastic action.

In the night from 6 to 7 May 1223, he abducted Valdemar II and his son Valdemar the Younger from the Danish island of Lyø, near Funen, where Valdemar was resting without his bodyguard, after he had been hunting. Henry I took his prisoners by boat to the German coast. As Schwerin was occupied by Danish troops, he hid his prisoners in Lenzen in Brandenburg, and later in the tower of the castle in Dannenberg. This tower was named Waldemar Tower (Waldermarturm), after the prisoner. After Henry I had reconquered the County of Schwerin in 1225, the prisoners were moved to Schwerin Castle.

Henry I demanded a high price for Valdemar's release. Threats by Denmark and Pope Honorius III could not dissuade him. He was supported by Lord Henry Borwin II of Mecklenburg, by Count Adolf IV of Holstein, and by Bishop Gebhard II of Bremen. Since Valdemar II refused to give in to Henry's demands, the situation came to a head in the Battle of Mölln in January 1225. The Danes were defeated and Albert of Orlamünde was taken prisoner.

After the Battle of Mölln, Valdemar finally gave in to the demands of Henry and his allies. In November 1225, the treaty of Bardowick was signed. In the treaty, it was agreed that Henry would release Valdemar and his son, and Valdemar would pay 45000 mark of silver, give up his claims on Schwerin and Holstein, renounce feudal overlordship over all German territories, except the Principality of Rügen, grant the German cities complete freedom of trade, renounce his right of revenge, and put three of his sons as hostages.

During Valdemar's captivity, the status of Denmark as the dominant power in the region had been shaken badly. Valdemar tried to reconquer the territories he had lost, but was decisively defeated in the Battle of Bornhöved on 22 July 1227. His ally, Duke Otto I of Brunswick was taken prisoner and brought to Schwerin. Valdemar was forced to reconfirm the Treaty of Bardowick. His goal of a Danish Empire in the Baltic area evaporated.

Henry I of Schwerin died on 16 February 1228. He was buried in Schwerin Cathedral. His widow Audacia (daughter of Bolesław of Kuyavia) and his son Gunzelin III released Otto I, after he had confirmed the agreement he had reached with Henry I. On 3 December 1228, Pope Gregory IX asked Audacia to release the three sons of Valdemar II she was still holding prisoner. However, she only let them go after Valdemar had paid an additional 7000 silver marks in 1230.

Henry I of Schwerin House of Schwerin Born: c. 1155 17 February
Preceded by Helmold I	Count of Schwerin; 1194-1228; With: Gunzelin II until 1221	Succeeded by Gunzelin III
