= John I of Mecklenburg =

Lord of Mecklenburg from 1234 to 1264

John I, Lord of Mecklenburg
- Born: c. 1211
- Died: 1 August 1264
- Buried: Doberan Minster
- Noble family: House of Mecklenburg
- Spouse: Liutgart of Henneberg
- Issue: Henry I Albert I Herman; Elizabeth; Nicholas III; Poppo; John II
- Father: Henry Borwin II, Lord of Mecklenburg
- Mother: Christina of Sweden

Mecklenburg coat of arms

John I, Lord of Mecklenburg, nicknamed the Theologian (c. 1211 – 1 August 1264) was Lord of Mecklenburg from 1234 until his death.

== Life ==
He was the eldest son of Henry Borwin II, Lord of Mecklenburg.

He ruled Mecklenburg jointly with his brothers, until they decided to divide the territory in 1234. As the eldest son, he received the ancestral homeland. In 1227, he defeated the Danish in the Battle of Bornhöved, thereby relieving Mecklenburg from Danish suzerainty. However, Saxe-Lauenburg and Holstein then began claiming suzerainty over Mecklenburg and he had to wage war against them to retain his sovereignty. In 1255, his brother Pribislaw I lost his Lordship of Parchim-Richenberg after a conflict with Bishop Rudolph I of Schwerin. Pribislaw was taken prisoner by the bishop and his brothers divided his territory between themselves, with John I receiving Sternberg.

John I supported the Church and the settlement of ethnic Germans in Mecklenburg, which was still predominantly Slavic during his reign. In 1262, he concluded an alliance with the Guelphs against Denmark.

He died in 1264 was buried in the Doberan Minster.

== Marriage and issue ==
John I married Luitgard of Henneberg (1210-1267), the daughter of Count Poppo VII of Henneberg. With her he had the following children:

- Henry I, nicknamed "the Pilgrim"
- Albert I, co-ruler from 1264 or 1265
- Herman, Dean of Schwerin
- Elizabeth (d. c. 1280), married to Gerhard I, Count of Holstein-Itzehoe
- Nicholas III, canon in Lübeck, was co-regent from 1275 to 1283, when Henry I was in captivity in Egypt
- Poppo, died before 1264
- John II, co-regent from 1264 to 1283

John I of Mecklenburg House of Mecklenburg Born: c. 1211 Died: 1 August 1264
Preceded by Henry Borwin II	Lord of Mecklenburg; 1234-1264	Succeeded by Henry I and Albert I
