= Niklot I of Schwerin =

German nobleman (1250–1323)

Niklot I, Count of Schwerin
- Born: 1250
- Died: 1323 (aged 72–73)
- Noble family: Hagen
- Spouses: Elisabeth of Holstein; Miroslawa of Pomerania
- Father: Gunzelin III, Count of Schwerin
- Mother: Margaret of Mecklenburg

Niklot I, Count of Schwerin (1250–1323) was the ruling Count of Schwerin-Wittenburg from 1299 until his death. He was a son of Count Gunzelin III of Schwerin and his wife, Margaret of Mecklenburg. Niklot married twice:

- Elisabeth, the daughter of Count John I of Holstein-Kiel
- Mirosalawa, the daughter of Duke Barnim I, Duke of Pomerania

Niklot was the father of:

- Gunzelin VI (d. 1327)
- Mechtild, a nun in Szczecin
- Beatrix, a nun in Szczecin
- Kunegonde, a nun in Zarrenthin
- Agnes, a nun in Zarrenthin
- Audacia, a nun and later abbess in Zarrenthin
- Anastasia (c. 1291 – after 1316), married in 1306 to Duke Valdemar IV of Schleswig and secondly, in 1313, to Count Gerhard IV of Holstein-Plön
- Barnim
- Miroslawa (1300–1368), married in 1327 Count John III of Holstein-Plön
- Nicholas II (d. 1350)

Niklot I of Schwerin House of Schwerin Born: 1250 Died: 1323
| Preceded by Helmold III | Count of Schwerin-Wittenburg; 1299-1323 | Succeeded by Gunzelin VI and Nicholas II |
