= County of Schwerin =

County of Schwerin Grafschaft Schwerin
- 1161–1368
- Coat of arms

- The County of Schwerin ( red) in 1250
- Status: County of the Holy Roman Empire
- Capital: Schwerin

Government
  - 1167–1185: Gunzelin I (first)
  - 1356–1358: Niklot I (last)
- Count
- History
  - Conquest of the territory by Henry the Lion: 1161
  - Schwerin was united into Mecklenburg by Henry IV: 1368
Preceded by	Succeeded by
Obotrites	Duchy of Mecklenburg
- Today part of: Germany

The County of Schwerin (German: Grafschaft Schwerin) was a county in the Mecklenburg region of the Holy Roman Empire that was created in 1161 following a conquest of the territory by Henry the Lion. The county would retain its independence until 1368 when it was sold to the lords of Mecklenburg who (re-)united it into the Duchy of Mecklenburg in 1471.

== History ==
In 1160, Henry the Lion defeated Niklot and conquered the Slavic castle in Schwerin. While Henry returned the other conquered lands to Nikolot's son, Pribislav, who had become Christian, he installed the loyal Gunzelin von Hagen as the count of Schwerin. Gunzelin I was first mentioned as count of Schwerin one year later, in 1161. In 1162, the bishopric in Mecklenburg was moved to Schwerin, creating the diocese and later prince-bishopric of Schwerin.

The County was bought by Albrecht II of Mecklenburg in the Treaty of Plüschow (7 December 1368) for 20,000 silver Marks or 240,000 Lübeck silver Mark. The lands of the county were (re-)united into the Duchy of Mecklenburg in 1471.

== List of counts ==
- 1167–1185: Gunzelin I
- 1185–1194: Helmold I
- 1195–1220: Gunzelin II
- 1200–1228: Henry I
- 1228–1274: Gunzelin III
- 1262–1296: Helmold III (II)
- 1296–1307: Gunzelin V and 1296–1344: Henry III
- 1344–1356: Otto I
- 1356–1358: Niklot I
