= Helmold III of Schwerin =

Helmold III, Count of Schwerin
- Born: before 1264
- Died: 1295
- Noble family: House of Hagen
- Spouses: Mathilda of Saxony; Margaret of Schleswig
- Father: Gunzelin III, Count of Schwerin
- Mother: Margaret of Mecklenburg

Helmhold III, Count of Schwerin (died 1295) was a German nobleman. He was a son of Count Gunzelin III of Schwerin-Boizenburg and Margaret of Mecklenburg. Helmhold III was the ruling Count of Schwerin-Neustadt and Marnitz from 1274 until his death.

== Marriages and issue ==
Helmold married twice. His first wife was Mathilda (some sources call her Margaret; d. 1265), a daughter of Albert I, Duke of Saxony. Together, they had three children:

- Gunzelin V
- Henry III
- Margaret, a nun in Zarrenthin Abbey

After Mathilda's death, Helmold married Margaret, the daughter of Eric I, Duke of Schleswig. This marriage remained childless.

Helmold III of Schwerin House of Schwerin Born: before 1264 Died: 1295
Preceded by Henry II	Count of Schwerin-Neustadt and Marnitz; 1274-1295	Succeeded by Gunzelin V
