= Battle of Bornhöved (1227) =

1227 battle in Holstein

- Part of Dano–German War (1226–1227)
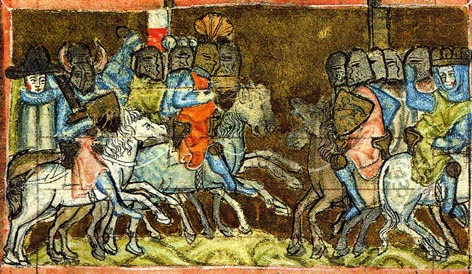
- The Battle of Bornhöved as displayed in the Sächsische Weltchronik
Date	22 July 1227
Location	Bornhöved, Holstein 54°4′N 10°12′E
Result	Holsteinian victory
Territorial changes	Holstein regained independence, Denmark forced to withdraw from northern Germany.

Belligerents
County of Holstein; Hanseatic League	Kingdom of Denmark; Otto the Child for a Welf principality

Commanders and leaders
Adolf IV, Count of Schauenburg and Holstein	Valdemar II, King of Denmark (WIA)

Strength
11.000-12.000	14.000

Casualties and losses
Thousands	6.000-8.000 killed or captured

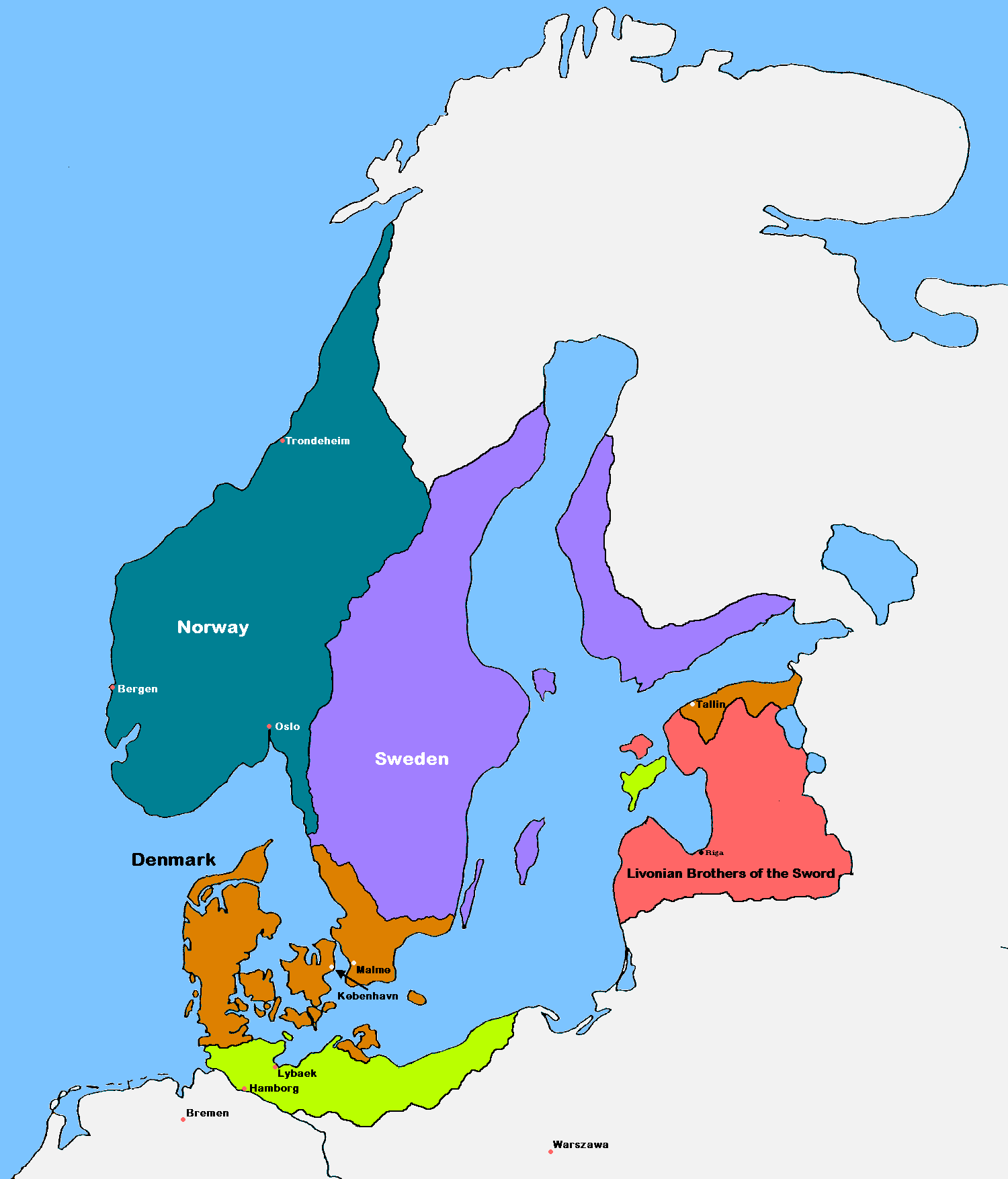
Map of Scandinavia in 1219 — Danish occupied areas shown in light green

The (second) Battle of Bornhöved took place on 22 July 1227 near Bornhöved in Holstein. Count Adolf IV of Schauenburg and Holstein — leading an army consisting of troops from the cities of Lübeck and Hamburg, Dithmarschen, Holstein, and various Northern German nobles, defeated King Valdemar II of Denmark and the Welf Otto the Child.

== Background ==
Valdemar and his predecessor King Canute VI of Denmark had previously conquered Holstein, Mecklenburg, Hamburg, Lübeck (1202), Ratzeburg and the coast of Pomerania, including the island of Rügen.

== Battle ==
The contest was maintained with great firmness on both sides, and continued for an unusual length of time. The carnage was so great that its combatants are said to have fought knee deep in blood. The King of Denmark had one of his eyes shot out, and had several horses killed under him, but his troops and their allies fought with so much bravery that the victory would have been theirs had not the contingent from Dithmarschen deserted their colours. At the most critical moment of the action these troops passed over to the enemy, and the Danes were obliged to give way. In the confusion that followed Otto I, Duke of Brunswick-Lüneburg and the Bishop of Ribe were taken prisoner. Otto was sent to Rostock, the capital of a lordship held by Mecklenburg, where he was shut up in a fortress. But the King of Denmark, who escaped from the field, busied himself in repairing this disaster by forming a fresh army, with which he kept the enemy in check.

== Result ==
As a result of the battle, the Danish border with the Holy Roman Empire was moved north again from river Elbe to the Eider River, the southern border of the Duchy of Schleswig. This border remained in effect until 1806. The victorious Adolf IV of Schauenburg regained the County of Holstein and his fellow victor Albert I, Duke of Saxony reasserted himself as liege lord of the Counts of Schauenburg and Holstein against the Welf claim. Dithmarschen shook off Danish supremacy and returned to a very loose overlordship by the Prince-Archbishopric of Bremen, paving the way for its de facto autonomy as a peasant republic until 1559. The Principality of Rügen was the only possession in the Holy Roman Empire left to Valdemar after the battle.
