= Stargard Castle =

Hill castle in Germany

Coordinates: 53.4925°N 13.3050°E

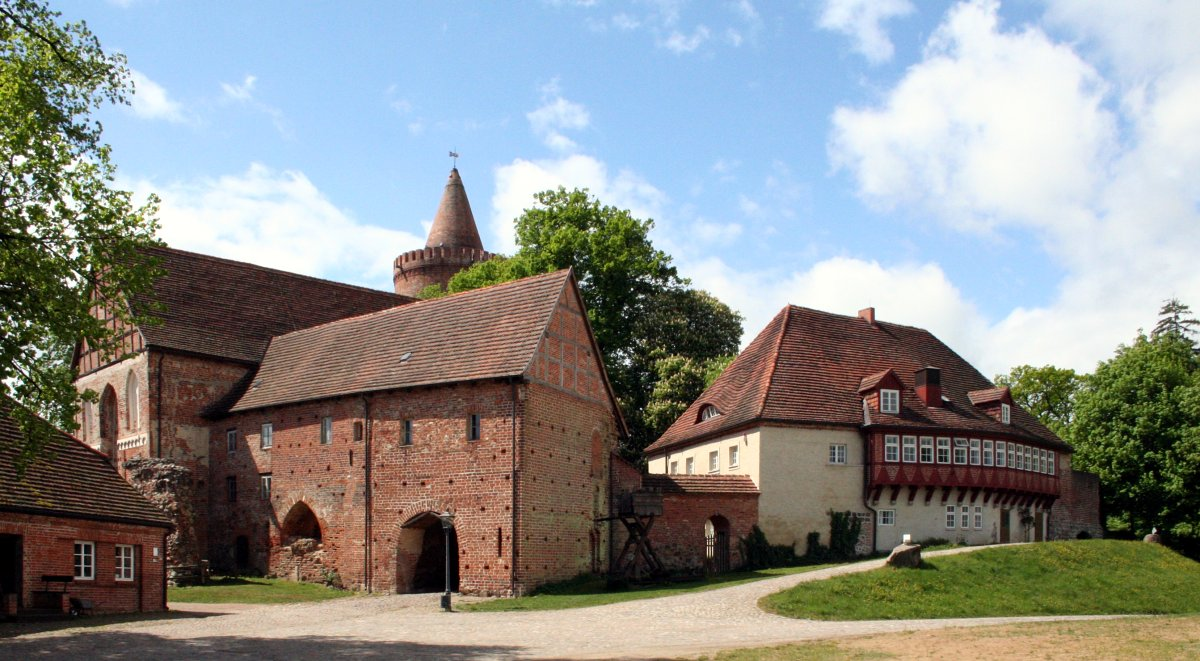
Official Reiterhaus (left), chapel and New Gate (center), mints (right)

Location of the castle

Stargard Castle is the northernmost extant hill castle in Germany. The 13th century castle, standing on a 90 m hill, and the eponymous small town in the valley below lie several kilometers southeast of Neubrandenburg, in the northeastern German state of Mecklenburg-Vorpommern. The complex consists of an outer and an inner bailey with eleven buildings preserved. The imposing castle keep serves as the city's landmark.

== History ==
The castle hill was settled already before 3000 BC. When Slavic tribes advanced into the area during the Migration Period, they encountered remnants of an ancient fortification or settlement and thus called the place Stari Gard (Pomeranian: old castle). Since the 12th century, the area was conquered and colonized by Christian German princes. In 1237, Duke Wartislaw III of Pomerania, ceded the so-called "country of Stargard" (German: Stargarder Land, Latin: terra stargardiensis) to the Ascanian Margraves of Brandenburg, John I and Otto III, by the treaty of Kremmen. Under their orders, most of the present castle was being built between 1240 and 1270, to protect their northernmost territories. The hamlet of Stargard received its town privileges from Margrave Otto III in 1259. In 1292, by marriage of Margrave Albert's daughter Beatrix with Prince Henry II of Mecklenburg, the Lordship of Stargard was ceded to Mecklenburg as a dower and has remained part of that region ever since. After one of the many partitions of Mecklenburg, Stargard Castle became the residence of Duke John I of Mecklenburg-Stargard in 1352. After the Stargard line became extinct in 1471, their duchy was reunited with the rest of country again. The reign of Albert VII saw the significant modification and expansion of the castle in 1520, e.g. the gatehouse was remodeled into a chapel. During the Thirty Years' War, Stargard served as headquarters of General Tilly during the siege and capture of the nearby city of Neubrandenburg, but was heavily damaged itself during this time. In 1646, the keep was struck by lightning and burnt out. Even after becoming part of the newly created duchy of Mecklenburg-Strelitz in 1701, the castle remained the seat of the local magistrate, as it had been for centuries. The last witch-hunt in Mecklenburg, if not the last in Northern Germany, took place here in 1726. A significant part of the complex, the Crooked House, which housed the magistrate's offices, burnt down in 1919. After surviving World War II without destruction, the castle's premises were used for educational purposes until 1963, then as a youth hostel till 1990. After the reunification, the whole complex was thoroughly restored. A museum was established, maintained by a Christian welfare work organisation. Today, it is also used for cultural events and for weddings in the restored castle chapel.

== Premises ==
Stargard Castle consists of an outer and an inner bailey with eleven buildings in total. Both the inner one, roughly oval-shaped, and the outer one are surrounded by a moat. The keep is widely known as the town's landmark. All buildings were built out of brick, which is evidence for the castle's great importance in medieval times. The castle and the park can be visited for free. The museum (which also serves as the town museum) and the ascent to the top of the keep's tower are subject to a charge.

=== The Keep ===
The keep was built ca. 1245 on a foundation of erratic boulders. In its lower parts, the walls are more than 4 m thick and have a circumference of 27 m. The entry is 9 m above ground and was accessed via a roofed wooden stairway (today a simple one out of metal). The dungeon is 13 m below the entry, i.e. also below the courtyard level. Above the dungeon, there were formerly three tower rooms. The keep burnt out due to a stroke of lightning in 1647. Grand Duke George entrusted F. W. Buttel, a student of the Prussian classicist architect Schinkel, with restoring and remodeling it into a viewing tower from 1821 to 1823. The tower is 38 m in height, including its 9 m tall cap. Under favourable conditions, it offers views up to 30 km all around, even as far as the windmills of Woldegk. The tower was restored in 1966.

=== The Crooked House ===
The large building complex (German: Krummes Haus) in the inner bailey traditionally housed the magistrate's offices. It burnt down completely on 18 December 1919, due to arson. It has remained a ruin ever since, although part of it received a tentative roof and floor for hosting cultural events in the 1990s.

=== The Chapel (former Upper Gate) ===
The Chapel developed as a three-storey gatehouse in the 1240s. The gate was inserted into the inner bailey's walls, but clearly protrudes out of them. After 1280, a chapel was established, at first in the upper storeys. Finally, in 1520, the drawbridge was dismantled, the gateway and the middle window were connected and then bricked up, and the building was refurnished as a chapel. Sixty years later, it was expanded towards the inner courtyard. In the 17th century, it was used as a garage and barn. Only between 1758 and 1770, it was used again, this time as a temporary municipal church, after most of the town had burnt down. Afterwards, it was again used for storage. The building shows a large pointed-arched window (now mostly bricked-up) and two smaller round-arched windows, one on each side, as well as a gable with 18th century framework. Remnants of the gate structure can be seen in the lesenes and the black glazed, round-arched friezes.

=== The Lower Gate ===
This gate was originally a brick building with a chapel in the upper storey, constructed about 1250. The gate was reinforced in the 16th century and remodeled in the 17th. Since 1755, it is partially destroyed, only the façade remained. The gable is edged by a round arch and once consisted of a staggered group of three windows, that are now walled up. As with the upper gate, there are lesenes and round-arched friezes next to the gateway. The former drawbridge was replaced by a stone causeway in the 16th century.

=== The Mint ===
The building was erected in the 13th century, with one its walls also serving as an outer wall of the inner bailey, including a guards' walkway. It served as the local mint for a long time. After it was used as a restaurant during World War II, it continued as a youth hostel during Socialist times. After comprehensive restoration work, it re-opened as a hotel and restaurant in 1999.
