= Battle of Gransee =

1316 battle in Germany

The Battle of Gransee was fought in August 1316 between the armies of a North German-Danish alliance led by the Duchy of Mecklenburg, and those of the Margraviate of Brandenburg and their allies. It took place near the village of Schulzendorf, Brandenburg, which is in present-day Germany. This was the final battle in the North German Margrave War (AKA Sunderkrieg). It was a decisive victory for the Alliance, who were subsequently able to impose their demands through the Treaty of Templin (24/25 November 1317).

== Background ==
The immediate cause of conflict was a dispute over succession to the Lordship of Stargard following the death in 1314 of Beatrix of Brandenburg, wife of Henry II, Lord of Mecklenburg (nicknamed "The Lion"). Waldemar, Margrave of Brandenburg-Stendal (nicknamed "The Great"), demanded the return of what he considered a fief of Brandenburg, which Beatrix had possessed only as part of her dowry (German: de:Leibgedinge). Henry countered by calling for military assistance from his allies – who included King Erik of Denmark, John of Werle, and other North German princes – and by invading Brandenburg. Waldemar assembled his forces at the walled city of Gransee to oppose them.

== Battle ==
Waldemar's forces consisted largely of knights in armour; Henry's of foot soldiers. It was conventional military wisdom in those days that heavy cavalry hopelessly outclassed light infantry. (Subsequent patriotic accounts from Mecklenburg even suggested that the Alliance was outnumbered four to one.) On John's advice, the Alliance decided on a surprise attack. Passing through a forest (remnants of which still exist as the Unterbusch), they crossed the Mühlenfließ near Schulzendorf. (The Mühlenfließ was a millstream which powered the watermill at Rauschendorf.) (Note: This Rauschendorf may be the same place as modern Rauschendorf, even though that place is first documented only in 1524.)

According to the chroniclers, it was the foot soldiers who won the day. The knights, fighting on foot, were immobile and vulnerable. (Note: The chroniclers refer to the knights being "lifted out of the saddle". The result of the battle makes it seem more likely that surprise was complete, and that the Brandenburgers were caught unprepared in their camp.) The battle swayed to and fro for several hours, and resembled a massacre. (Note: If the chroniclers can be believed.) Henry caught an axe blow to the helmet in the initial phase of the battle, and had to be supported from the field; but later returned to fight with undiminished vigour.

Seven counts on the Brandenburg side, including Albrecht V of Wernigerode and the Count of Mansfeld, were taken prisoner. Waldemar himself only escaped because Count von Manseld fought to give him the opportunity. Waldemar and his retinue retreated in some disorder to Gransee, said by Fontane to have been the strongest place in the Lordship of Ruppin. On the Alliance side, John III, Count of Holstein-Plön was captured.

== Aftermath ==
The victorious Alliance withdrew to Buchholz by way of Rheinsberg and Wesenberg, and celebrated their victory.

The two sides now began to negotiate, at first in Zehdenick. The captured noblemen were important bargaining counters. Under the Treaty of Templin, Waldemar was forced to agree to cede Starburg to Mecklenburg.

Waldemar died in 1319. His cousin, Henry II, Margrave of Brandenburg-Stendal, died in 1320, at the age of 12 or 13. The claims of the House of Ascania to the Margraviate of Brandenburg and its possessions (including Starburg) thereupon became extinct, and the quarrel was never revived.

== Modern times ==
On 30 July 2016, near the 700th anniversary of the battle, the municipal councils of Gransee, Sonnenberg and Schulzendorf, together with the Stargarder Burgverein, dedicated a memorial to the battle. It consists of a plaque which includes a panorama of the battlefield, and historical information by Carsten Dräger, local historian, and by Frank Saß, head of the Stargarden Castle museum.
