= John III of Mecklenburg-Stargard =

Duke of Mecklenburg-Stargard

John III, Duke of Mecklenburg-Stargard
- Born: 1389
- Died: after 11 November 1438; Sternberg
- Buried: probably Sternberg
- Noble family: House of Mecklenburg
- Spouse: Luttrud of Anhalt-Köthen
- Father: John II, Duke of Mecklenburg-Stargard
- Mother: Catherine of Lithuania

John III, Duke of Mecklenburg-Stargard (1389 – after 11 November 1438) was from 1416 to 1438 Duke of Mecklenburg, Lord of Stargard, Sternberg, Friedland, Fürstenberg, and Lychen. To distinguish him from John V, Duke of Mecklenburg, he is sometimes called John the Elder.

== Family ==
He was the oldest child of Duke John II and his wife Catherine (Wilheida) of Lithuania.

== Life ==
John III was probably born in 1389. In 1416, he took over the reign of Sternberg from his father. He was taken prisoner by Brandenburg, for unknown reasons. He was released on 28 June 1427, under the condition that he had to swear an oath of allegiance to the Margrave of Brandenburg.

In 1436, he and his cousin Henry and his remote cousin Henry IV of Mecklenburg-Schwerin, jointly inherited the Lordship of Werle.

He married Luttrud, the daughter of Albert IV of Anhalt-Köthen. She was probably a sister of Anna, the first wife of William of Werle, the last Lord of Werle. The marriage remained childless.

John III died in 1438 and was probably buried in Sternberg. His cousin Henry of Mecklenburg-Stargard inherited his possessions.

John III of Mecklenburg-Stargard House of Mecklenburg Born: 1389 Died: after 11 November 1438
Preceded by John II	Duke of Mecklenburg-Stargard; 1416-1438; With: Albert II and Henry	Succeeded by Henry
