= Ulrich I of Mecklenburg-Stargard =

Ulrich I, Duke of Mecklenburg-Stargard
- Coats-of-arms of Mecklenburg
- Born: before 1382
- Died: 8 April 1417; Strelitz
- Buried: Blankensee
- Noble family: House of Mecklenburg
- Spouse: Margaret of Pomerania-Stettin
- Father: John I, Duke of Mecklenburg-Stargard
- Mother: Agnes of Lindow-Ruppin

Ulrich I, Duke of Mecklenburg-Stargard (before 1382 – 8 April 1417) was Duke of Mecklenburg-Stargard from 1392 or 1393 until his death. He was also Lord of Neubrandenburg, Stargard, Strelitz and Wesenberg.

== Family ==
He was the third child of Duke John I, from his marriage Agnes of Lindow-Ruppin.

== Life ==
Ulrich I was probably born before 1382. After his father's death in 1392 or 1393, he ruled jointly with his brothers John II and Albert I (d. 1397). In 1408, Ulrich and John divided the country. Ulrich received the Lordships of Neubrandenburg, Stargard, Strelitz and Wesenberg. He chose Neubrandenburg as his residence.

On 19 March 1417, he wrote his will at his Castle in Strelitz. He died there three weeks later, on 8 April 1417. He was buried in the Wanzka convent in Blankensee, where his daughter Anna was abbess.

== Marriage and issue ==
Ulrich I married Margaret, the daughter of Duke Swantibor III of Pomerania-Stettin. They had the following children:

- Anna, Abbess of the Wanzka convent in Blankensee
- Albert II, Duke of Mecklenburg-Stargard-Neubrandenburg (1417–1423)
- Henry, Duke of Mecklenburg-Stargard-Neubrandenburg (1417–1436), from 1438 Duke of Mecklenburg-Stargard, from 1436 co-ruler of the principality Werle-Güstrow

Ulrich I of Mecklenburg-Stargard House of Mecklenburg Born: before 1382 Died: 8 April 1417
Preceded by John I	Duke of Mecklenburg-Stargard; 1393-1417	Succeeded by Henry
