= John VII of Werle =

- Born: circa 1375
- Died: between 14 August and 17 December 1414
- Spouse: Catherine of Saxe-Lauenburg
- House: House of Mecklenburg
- Father: Lorenz of Werle
- Mother: Mechthild

John VII of Werle-Güstrow (born: circa 1375; died between 14 August and 17 December 1414) was from 1395 to 1414 Lord of Werle-Güstrow. He was the second eldest son of Lorenz, Lord of Werle-Güstrow, and Mechthild (d. before 17 December 1402). After the death of his father Lorenz in 1393 or 1394, his brother Balthasar initially ruled alone, but from 11 December 1395 John and Balthasar ruled Werle together. From 1 May 1401, their brother William was co-ruler as well.

John married Catherine of Saxe-Lauenburg, a daughter of Erich IV of Saxe-Lauenburg. After his death, she married John IV of Mecklenburg. He had no known children.
