= Anna of Saxe-Wittenberg (died 1327) =

German noblewoman and Lady of Mecklenburg (died 1327)

- Lady of Mecklenburg
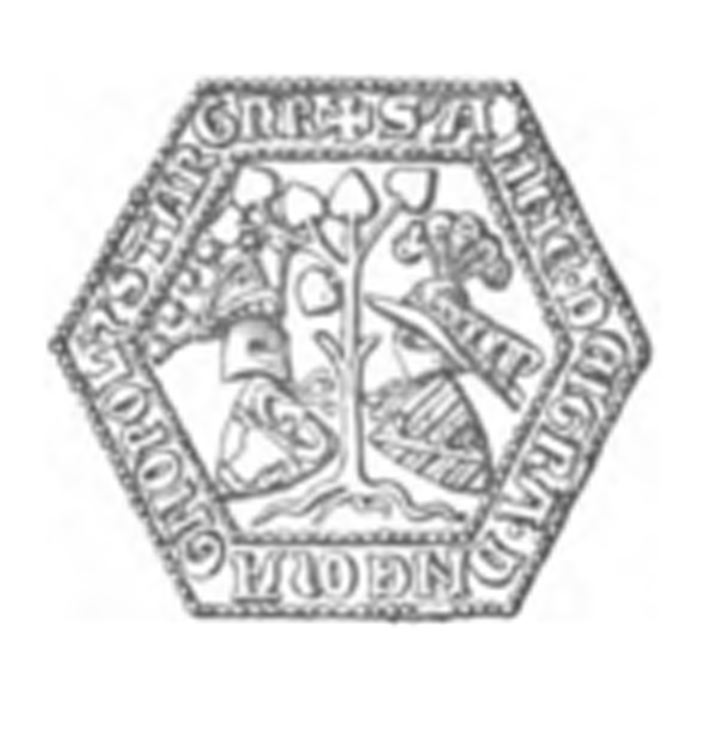
- Illustration of Anna of Saxe-Wittenberg from a 1321 record in the Mecklenburgisches Urkundenbuch.
- Born: c. 1290
- Died: 22 November 1327; Wismar, Lordship of Mecklenburg
- Spouse: Henry II, Lord of Mecklenburg (m. 1308)
- Issue: Ludgarda; Henry; Anastasia; Albert II, Duke of Mecklenburg; Agnes; Beatrix
- House: Ascania
- Father: Albert II, Duke of Saxony
- Mother: Agnes of Austria
- Religion: Catholicism

Anna of Saxe-Wittenberg (c.1290 – 22 November 1327) was a German noblewoman of the House of Ascania. By her marriage to Henry II, Lord of Mecklenburg, she served as the Lady of Mecklenburg during a period of significant territorial expansion for the House of Mecklenburg.

== Family ==
Anna was the daughter of Albert II, Duke of Saxony and Agnes of Austria, a daughter of King Rudolf I of Germany. Her lineage connected the Saxon ducal house with the rising House of Habsburg, which significantly enhanced the political prestige of her husband's court.

== Marriage and issue ==
In 6 July 1315, Anna married Henry II, Lord of Mecklenburg as his second wife..The union produced the following children:

- Ludgarda (1316 – 1362); married Władysław of Bytom.
- Henry (1316 – 1321); died in childhood.
- Anastasia (1317 – 1321); died in childhood.
- Albert II, Duke of Mecklenburg(1318 – 1379); known as "the Great," he succeeded his father and became the first Duke of Mecklenburg.
- Agnes (1320 – 1340); married Nicholas III, Lord of Werle.
- Beatrix (1324 – 5 August 1399); served as the Abbess of Ribnitz Monastery from 1348 to 1395.
- John I of Mecklenburg-Stargard (1326 – 1392 or 1393)

== Death ==
Anna died in November 1327. Following her death, Henry II contracted a third marriage with Anna of Brandenburg-Stendal to further consolidate political ties between the Ascanian and Mecklenburg houses.

== Ancestry ==
Ancestors of Anna of Saxe-Wittenberg (died 1327)

8. Bernard III, Duke of Saxony
4. Albert I, Duke of Saxony
9. Judith of Poland
2. Albert II, Duke of Saxony
10. Otto I, Duke of Brunswick-Lüneburg
5. Helene of Brunswick-Lüneburg
11. Matilda of Brandenburg
1. Anna of Saxe-Wittenberg
12. Albert IV, Count of Habsburg
6. Rudolf I, King of Germany
13. Heilwig of Kiburg
3. Agnes of Austria
14. Burchard V, Count of Hohenberg
7. Gertrude of Hohenberg
15. Mechtild of Tübingen
