= Nicholas V of Werle =

- Born: between 1341 and 1385
- Died: after 21 January 1408
- Noble family: House of Mecklenburg
- Spouse: Sophie of Pomerania-Wolgast
- Father: John VI of Werle
- Mother: Agnes of Werle-Goldberg

Lord Nicholas V of Werle [-Goldberg and -Waren] (between 1341 and 1385 – after 21 January 1408) was Lord of Werle-Goldberg and Werle-Waren from 1385 (or 1395) until 1408. He was the son of John VI of Werle and Agnes, the daughter of Nicholas IV of Werle-Goldberg.

He reigned jointly with his father and after his father's death, he ruled alone until 1401. After 1401, he ruled jointly with his brother Christopher on the rule Werle. After 1397 he married Sophie (died: before 21 August 1408), the daughter of Duke Bogislaw VI of Pomerania-Wolgast. She was the widow of the Duke Eric I of Mecklenburg-Schwerin.

Nicholas V died in 1408 and was buried in the Doberan Minster.

His daughter Judith (nicknamed Jutta) was married to Henry, Duke of Mecklenburg-Stargard.

Nicholas V of Werle House of Mecklenburg Born: between 1341 and 1385 Died: after 21 January 1408
Preceded by John VI	Lord of Werle; 1385 or 1395 – 1408	Succeeded by Christopher
