= Christopher of Werle =

- Born: before 1385
- Died: 25 August 1425; Pritzwalk
- Noble family: House of Mecklenburg
- Father: John VI of Werle
- Mother: Agnes of Werle-Goldberg

Christopher of Werle, Prince of the Wends (born: before 1385; died: 25 August 1425) was from 1395 or earlier to 1425, Lord of Werle-Goldberg and Werle-Waren. He succeeded his father, who died between 1385 and 1395. He was the son of John VI of Werle and Agnes, a daughter of Nicholas IV of Werle-Goldberg.

After his father's death, his brother Nicholas V ruled alone until Christopher came of age; from 1401, they ruled jointly. After Nicholas V died in 1408, Christopher ruled alone. He began calling himself "Prince of the Wends" on 4 May 1418 on the basis of chronicles written by Bishop Otto of Havelberg, which he regarded as evidence for his royal descent. He was probably killed on 25 August 1425 during a battle at Pritzwalk against troops from Brandenburg.

He was probably unmarried and definitely childless. With his death, the Werle-Goldberg line died out and Werle-Goldberg fell to his cousin William.

Christopher of Werle House of Mecklenburg Born: before 1385 Died: 25 August 1425
Preceded by Nicholas V	Lord of Werle-Waren between 1385 and 1395 — 1425	Succeeded by William as Lord of Werle
