= John IV of Werle =

- Born: before 1350
- Died: between 13 March and 14 December 1374
- Buried: Doberan Minster
- Noble family: House of Mecklenburg
- Father: Nicholas IV of Werle
- Mother: Agnes of Lindow-Ruppin

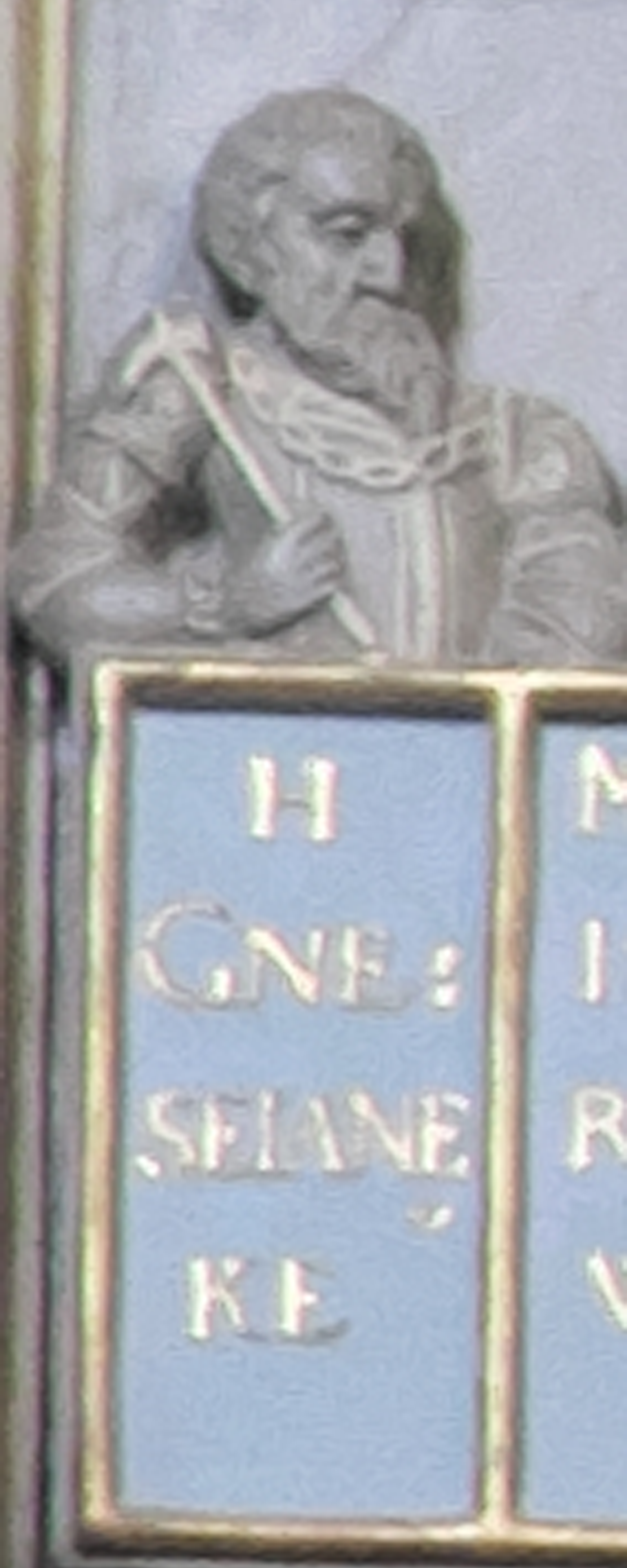
John IV, Lord of Goldberg

John IV of Werle-Goldberg, (before 1350 – between 13 March and 14 December 1374) was from 1354 until his death Lord of Werle-Goldberg.

He was the son of Nicholas IV and Agnes of Lindow-Ruppin.

As he was still a minor when he inherited Werle, his mother put him under the guardianship of Duke Albert II of Mecklenburg. However, a dispute arose between Albert II and John's mother, and she then chose Lord Nicholas III of Werle-Güstrow as his guardian. After Nicholas's death, John IV ruled for himself.

On 31 October 1366, he closed a marriage contract with Duke Albert II and his sons, in which he was promised he could marry Euphemia, the four-year-old daughter of Albert's son Henry III. The marriage was planned for 1379, when she would be 17 years old. However, John IV died in 1374, so the marriage never took place.

He died in 1374, unmarried and childless. With his death, the Werle-Goldberg line died out and Werle-Goldberg fell to Bernard II of Werle-Güstrow. He was probably buried in the Doberan Minster.

John IV of Werle House of Mecklenburg Born: before 1350 Died: between 13 March and 14 December 1374
Preceded by Nicholas IV	Lord of Werle-Goldberg	Succeeded by Bernard II as Lord of Werle-Güstrow
