= Werle =

Lordship of Werle Herrschaft Werle (de)
- 1235–1436
- Coat of arms

- The Lordship of Werle at the time of the Hohenstaufen Emperors (circa 1250).

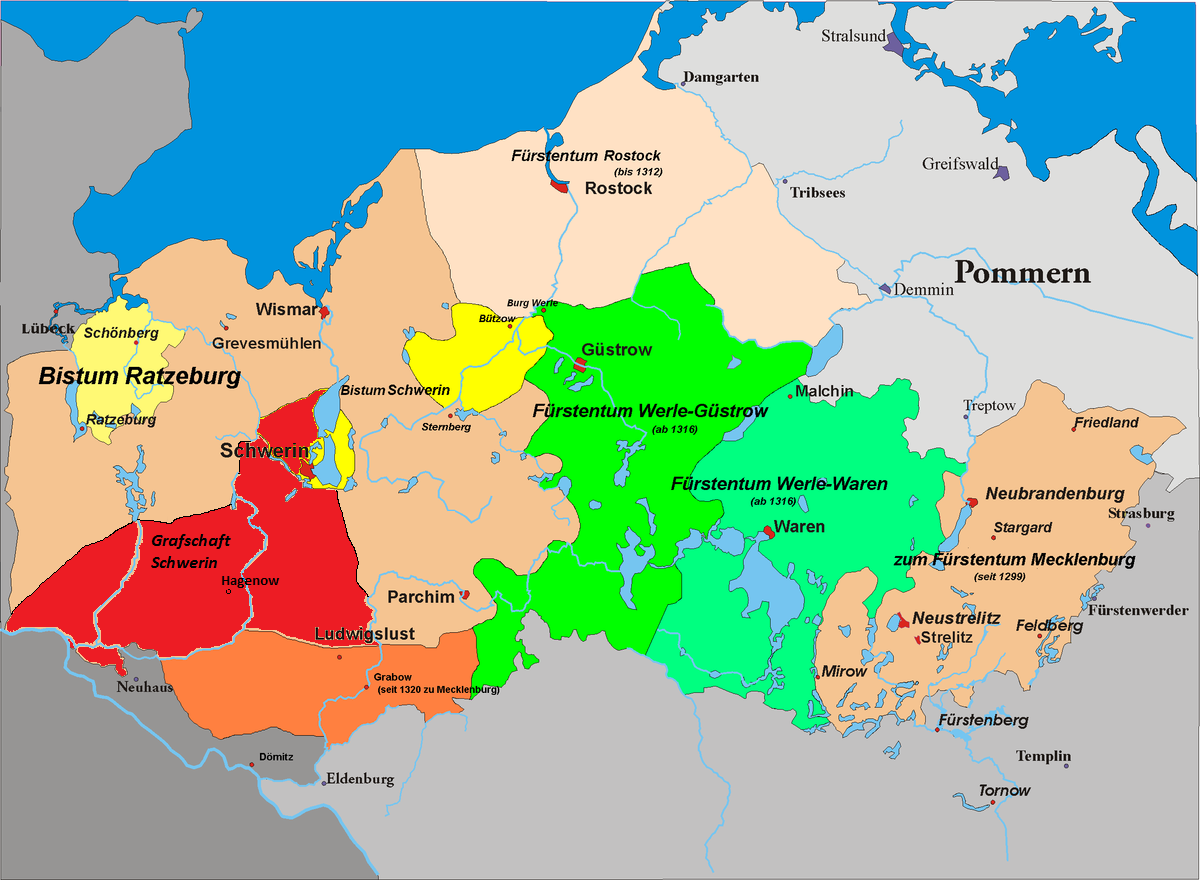
- An anachronistic map of Mecklenburg in the early 14th century: Werle-Güstrow circa 1316; Werle-Waren circa 1316; Duchy of Mecklenburg; Lordship/Principality of Rostock up to 1312 to Mecklenburg from 1320
- Status: State of the Holy Roman Empire
- Capital: Werle
- Common languages: Middle Low German
- Government: Principality
- Historical era: Middle Ages
  - Established: 1235
  - Partitioned: W-Güstrow and W-Parchim: 1277–1307
  - Partitioned: W-Güstrow and W-Goldberg: 1316–74
  - W-Güstrow partitioned to create W-Waren: 1337–1425
  - Reverted to Mecklenburg: September 7, 1436
| Preceded by | Succeeded by |
| Duchy of Mecklenburg | Duchy of Mecklenburg |

Werle (or Wenden) was a fiefdom in the Holy Roman Empire that was founded in 1235. In German it is known as a Herrschaft (usually translated as "lordship") or Fürstentum (principality). It was created in the partition of territories in Mecklenburg that followed the death of Henry Borwin II of Mecklenburg (died 1226).

The royal (fürstlich in German) House of Werle was a spur line of the House of Mecklenburg line of the Obotrites. The Fiefdom of Werle lay in the area around Güstrow in today's Mecklenburg-Western Pomerania, Germany, and stretched eastward to Müritz. It was named after the then-capital Werle, now a village in the municipality Kassow, Rostock district.

The fiefdom collapsed several times into separate dominions. In 1277 it was divided among the sons of the first lord, or Herr in German, into Werle-Güstrow and Werle-Parchim. In 1307, both were reunited by Nicholas II, but they were divided again in 1316 into Werle-Güstrow and Werle-Goldberg. In 1337, Werle-Waren split off from the Werle-Güstrow line. With the death of the William, the last lord on September 7, 1436, the fiefdom once again reverted to Mecklenburg. The title of Lord of Werle was thenceforth carried by all rulers of Mecklenburg. Werle is represented in one of the seven fields of the coat of arms of Mecklenburg.

== List of lords ==
- Nicholas I Lord of Werle (1227–1277) (son of Henry Borwin II of Mecklenburg)
- Henry I, Lord of Werle-Güstrow (1277–1291) (son of Nicholas I)
- John I, Lord of Werle-Parchim (1277–1283) (son of Nicholas I)
- Bernard I, Lord of Werle (d. 1286) (son of Nicholas I)
- Henry II (fr), Lord of Werle in Penzlin, (1291–1307) (son of Henry I)
- Nicholas II, Lord of Werle (1283–1316) (son of John I)
- John II, Lord of Werle-Güstrow (1316–1337) (son of John I)
- John III, Lord of Werle-Goldberg (1316–1350), d. 1352 (son of Nicholas II)
- Nicholas III, Lord of Werle-Güstrow (1337–1360) (son of John II)
- Bernard II, Lord of Werle-Waren (1337–1382) (son of John II)
- Nicholas IV, Lord of Werle-Goldberg (1350–1354) (son of John III)
- Lorenz, Lord of Werle-Güstrow (1360–1393) (son of Nicholas III)
- John V, Lord of Werle-Güstrow (1360–1377) (son of Nicholas III)
- John VI, Lord of Werle-Waren (1382–1385/95) (son of Bernard II)
- John IV, Lord of Werle-Goldberg (1354–1374) (son of Nicholas IV)
- Balthasar, Lord of Werle-Güstrow (1393–1421) (son of Lorenz)
- John VII, Lord of Werle-Güstrow (1393–1414) (son of Lorenz)
- William, Lord of Werle-Güstrow, Prince of the Wends (1393–1436) (son of Lorenz)
- Nicholas V, Lord of Werle-Waren (1385/95–1408) (son of John VI)
- Christopher, Lord of Werle-Waren (1385/95–1425) (son of John VI)
