= Beatrix of Brandenburg =

- Died: 22 September 1314; Wismar
- Noble family: House of Ascania
- Spouse: Henry II, Lord of Mecklenburg
- Father: Albert III, Margrave of Brandenburg-Salzwedel
- Mother: Matilda of Denmark

Beatrix of Brandenburg (died 22 September 1314 in Wismar) was the first wife of Lord Henry II "the Lion" of Mecklenburg (1266–1329), whom she married in 1292 at Stargard Castle.

Beatrix was the daughter of Margrave Albert III of Brandenburg and his wife, Matilda of Denmark. Their wedding in 1292 is historically significant because Beatrix brought the Lordship of Stargard as dowry into the marriage and thus into the hands of Mecklenburg. Beatrix's marriage did not produce a male heir, so the Ascanians reckoned Stargard fell back to Brandenburg when she died. Mecklenburg disagreed and this led to the so-called "North German Margrave War". Mecklenburg won and under the terms of the Treaty of Templin of 1317, Stargard definitively became part of Mecklenburg.
