= Agnes of Austria (1270–1322) =

Duchess of Saxony and daughter of King Rudolf I (c. 1270 – 1322)

- Duchess of Saxony
- Born: c. 1270
- Died: 11 October 1322; Wittenberg, Electorate of Saxony
- Burial: Wittenberg
- Spouse: Albert II, Duke of Saxony (m. 1282; died 1298)
- Issue: Rudolf I, Duke of Saxe-Wittenberg; Albert of Saxony (bishop); Anna, Lady of Mecklenburg; Wenceslaus, Canon of Mainz; Elizabeth, Marchioness of Ferrara; Margaret, Lady of Brunswick-Grubenhagen
- House: House of Habsburg
- Father: Rudolf I of Germany
- Mother: Gertrude of Hohenberg
- Religion: Catholicism

Agnes of Austria (c. 1270 – 11 October 1322) was a member of the House of Habsburg and, by marriage to Albert II, Duke of Saxony, the Duchess of Saxony. She was the daughter of Rudolf I of Germany, the first King of the Romans from the Habsburg dynasty, and his consort Gertrude of Hohenberg.

== Life ==
Born around 1270, Agnes's life was centered on the strategic marriage diplomacy of her father, King Rudolf I. In 1282, she was wed to Albert II, Duke of Saxony in Aachen, a union that secured the support of the House of Ascania for the newly established Habsburg monarchy.

As Duchess, she resided primarily in Wittenberg, which she helped develop into a significant Ascanian administrative center. Following her husband's death in 1298, Agnes remained a powerful figure at court, guiding her son Rudolf I, Duke of Saxe-Wittenberg during the early years of his reign and maintaining strong ties with her Habsburg kinsmen in Vienna.

== Issue ==
The marriage of Agnes and Albert II produced at least six children:

- Rudolf I, Duke of Saxe-Wittenberg (c. 1284 – 1356); the first Elector of Saxony.
- Albert (died 1342); Bishop of Passau.
- Anna (died 1327); married Henry II, Lord of Mecklenburg.
- Wenceslaus (died 1327); became a Canon at Mainz Cathedral.
- Elizabeth (died 1341); married Obizzo III d'Este, Marquis of Ferrara.
- Margaret (died 1329); married Henry I, Lord of Brunswick-Grubenhagen.

== Ancestry ==
Ancestors of Agnes of Austria (1270–1322)

8. Rudolf II, Count of Habsburg
4. Albert IV, Count of Habsburg
9. Agnes of Staufen
2. Rudolf I of Germany
10. Ulrich, Count of Kiburg
5. Heilwig of Kiburg
11. Anna of Zähringen
1. Agnes of Austria
12. Burchard IV, Count of Hohenberg
6. Burchard V, Count of Hohenberg
13. Valpurga of Veringen
3. Gertrude of Hohenberg
14. Rudolph II, Count of Tübingen
7. Mechtild of Tübingen
15. Daughter of the Count of Ronsberg
