= Burg Stargard =

Town in Mecklenburg-Vorpommern, Germany

- Town
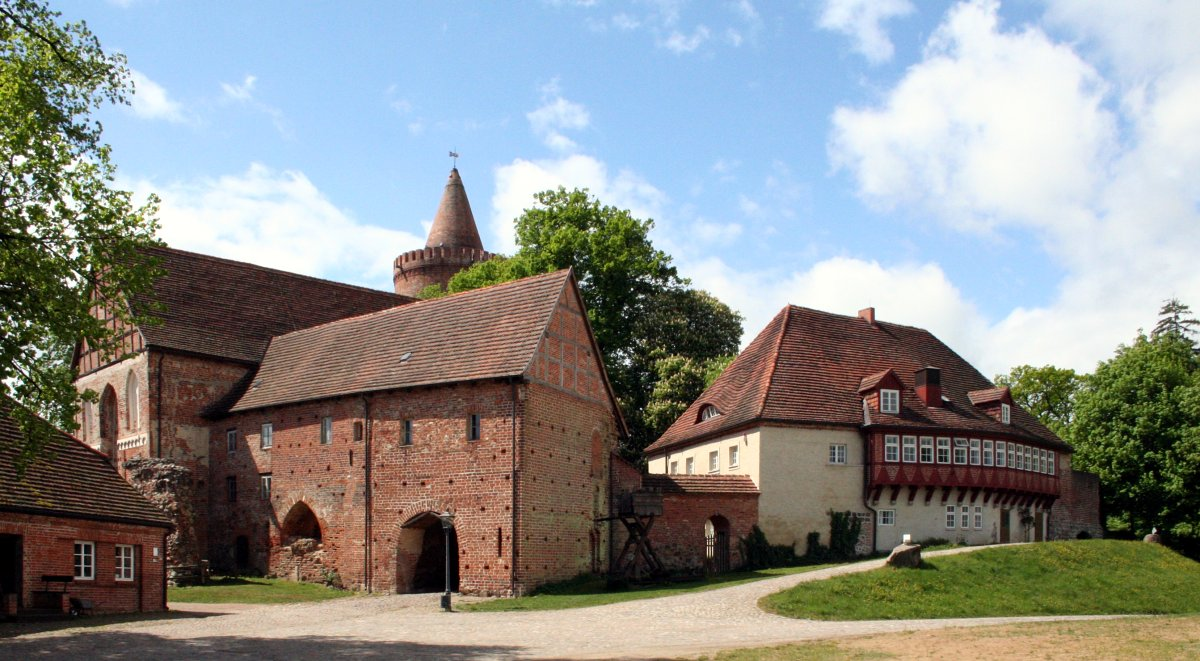
- Brick Gothic castle

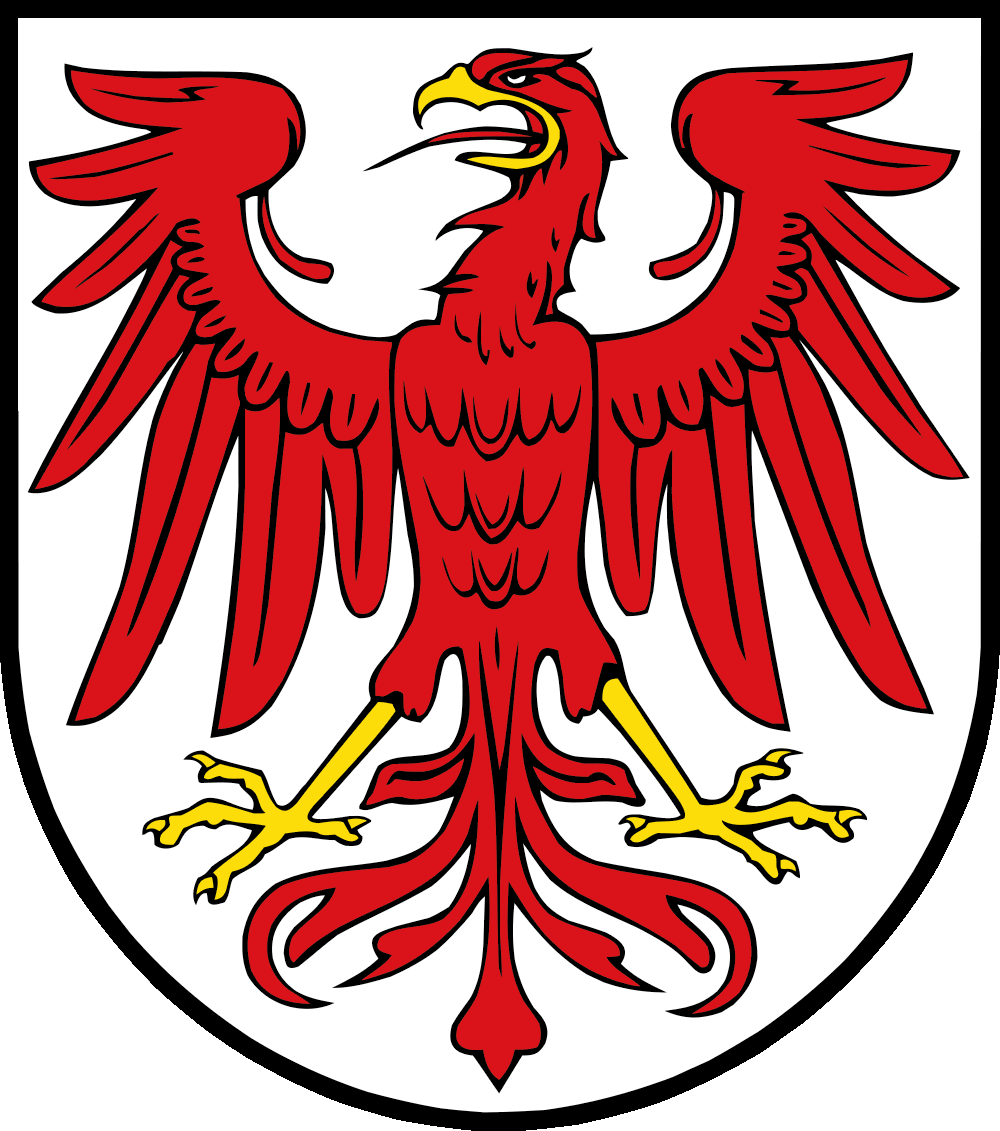
- Flag Coat of arms

- Location of Burg Stargard within Mecklenburgische Seenplatte district
- Interactive map of Burg Stargard
- Location within Germany Location within Mecklenburg-Vorpommern
- Coordinates: 53°29′N 13°18′E
- Country: Germany
- State: Mecklenburg-Vorpommern
- District: Mecklenburgische Seenplatte
- Municipal assoc.: Stargarder Land

Government
  - Mayor: Tilo Lorenz

Area
  - Total: 76.61 km^{2} (29.58 sq mi)
- Elevation: 50 m (160 ft)

Population (2025-12-31)
  - Total: 5,166
  - Density: 67.43/km^{2} (174.6/sq mi)
- Time zone: UTC+01:00 (CET)
  - Summer (DST): UTC+02:00 (CEST)
- Postal codes: 17094
- Dialling codes: 039603
- Vehicle registration: MST
- Website: www.burg-stargard.de

Burg Stargard (German pronunciation: [ˈbʊʁk ˈʃtaːɐ̯ɡaʁt]; Polabian: Stargart, until 1929: Stargard in Mecklenburg) is a small town in the Mecklenburgische Seenplatte district, in Mecklenburg-Vorpommern, Germany. It is situated 8 kilometres (5.0 mi) southeast of Neubrandenburg.

The town's sights include: Germany's most northerly hill castle, a local history museum in the castle, a historic town centre and an exhibition by Marie Hager, the well-known German artist.

== History ==
The castle is first mentioned in 1170, as Stargart — meaning "old castle,"old city/town" in the now-extinct West Slavic language Polabian, Pomeranian and the only surviving cousin of Polabian, Kashubian language. The name is a combination of stari (old) and gard (town/city/castle). Allegedly, the Bishopric of Havelberg presented the castle to Broda Abbey on its foundation, but the relevant document is a forgery; the place is attested as Staregart in a later document, however, probably dating to the year 1244. Supposedly to avoid confusion with other cities named Stargard, the town has been known as Burg Stargard since 1929.

From the early 13th century, merchants and artisans started settling around the base of the castle, betraying the increasing colonization of formerly Slavic areas and being of early importance as a centre of the Lordship of Stargard, named for the castle, with a Bergfried being erected in 1250. No archaeological evidence can be found for earlier Slavic settlements in the location, however. The castle is now the most northerly high castle in Germany and the oldest secular building in Mecklenburg-Vorpommern.

In 1259, Brandenburg awarded Stargard with town privileges. At the 1292 marriage of Henry II, Lord of Mecklenburg, the Lordship was given as dowry by the Ascanians to the princes, who later became dukes of Mecklenburg. Stargard became the residence of the rulers of Mecklenburg-Stargard, an offshoot of the Mecklenburg dynasty, between 1352 and 1471. According to the Sächsischer Lehnsabhängigkeit, Charles IV, Holy Roman Emperor granted Reichsunmittelbarkeit to the territory on 16 October 1347, subsequently granting the territory as a fief of the Mecklenburg princes.

During the Thirty Years' War, the castle served as headquarters for Johann t'Serclaes, Count of Tilly, general of the Imperial forces, later becoming a seat of ducal administration. The town suffered during the general decline of the region in the aftermath of the Thirty Years' War. In 1758 a major fire largely destroyed the town; emblematic of the town's fading fortunes, losing its local importance.

In the wake of the German Revolution, a 1920 Amtsordnung redefined political borders in the area, with an Amt of Stargard based in Neubrandenburg and an Amt of Strelitz, based in Neustrelitz.

In 1929, the town of Stargard was renamed Burg Stargard, to differentiate it from other namesakes, particularly the nearby Stargard in Pommern, now Stargard in the West Pomeranian Voivodeship of Poland but then in the Prussian Province of Pomerania. On 10 January 1934, the two Ämter were merged into Kreis Strelitz district based in Neustrelitz, later to be known as Kreis Stargard. These local government arrangements survived until the 1952 reorganization of local government within the German Democratic Republic (East Germany).

During World War II, Jewish women from Poland, the Soviet Union and France were held in the "Nemerower Holz", an outpost of the Ravensbrück concentration camp, where parts were manufactured for the V-1 flying bomb, with between 1200 and 2000 women enduring forced labour here. In April 1945, camp Waldbau was emptied and the prisoners were forced on a death march to Malchow, where survivors were liberated by the Red Army.

After the reunification of Germany, urban regeneration of the town included renovation of the castle and the historic town centre, though this latter is now falling into decay.

The castle is now a tourist attraction in the area, with views from the tower and special events such as an annual knights' tournament. In July 2009, there was a three-day festival celebrating the 750th anniversary of the town's charter, with a parade showing scenes from the town's history, a rock concert and a fireworks display.

== Notable people from Burg Stargard ==
- Carl Ludwig Christian Rümker (1788–1862), master builder, maths teacher, midshipman and astronomer.
- Karl Friedrich Vollrath Hoffmann (1796-1842), geographer and publicist
- Carl Friedrich Stolte (1824–1897), a teacher in Stargard school from 1844; followed the ideas of Pestalozzi.
- Johanna Beckmann, (DE Wiki) (1868–1941), a china painter and silhouette artist, brought up in Stargard.
- Marie Hager (1872–1947), a painter; had exhibitions in Munich, Hamburg and Paris; died locally
- Volker Schmidt, (DE Wiki) (1942-2002), archaeologist, Rethra researcher

=== Aristocracy ===
- Albert I, Duke of Mecklenburg-Stargard (1377–1397), Duke of Mecklenburg-Stargard from 1392 to 1397
- Albert II, Duke of Mecklenburg-Stargard (1400 – ca 1422), Duke of Mecklenburg-Stargard 1417 until his death.
- Henry, Duke of Mecklenburg-Stargard (1412–1466), Duke of Mecklenburg-Stargard from 1417 to 1466.

== Sport ==
Burg Stargard has a multisport club, SV Burg Stargard 09, with around 400 sportsmen playing football, handball, volleyball and athletics.

== International relations ==
Burg Stargard is twinned with:

- Marne in Dithmarschen, Schleswig-Holstein, Germany, since 1990
- Tychowo, Białogard County in West Pomerania, Poland, since 2006
