= Bröbberow =

- Municipality
- Location of Bröbberow within Rostock district
- Interactive map of Bröbberow
- Location within Germany Location within Mecklenburg-Vorpommern
- Coordinates: 53°57′N 12°2′E
- Country: Germany
- State: Mecklenburg-Vorpommern
- District: Rostock
- Municipal assoc.: Schwaan

Government
  - Mayor: Steffen Marklein

Area
  - Total: 14.35 km^{2} (5.54 sq mi)
- Elevation: 15 m (49 ft)

Population (2025-12-31)
  - Total: 669
  - Density: 46.6/km^{2} (121/sq mi)
- Time zone: UTC+01:00 (CET)
  - Summer (DST): UTC+02:00 (CEST)
- Postal codes: 18258
- Dialling codes: 03844
- Vehicle registration: LRO
- Website: www.amt-schwaan.de

Bröbberow is a municipality in the district of Rostock, in Mecklenburg, Germany, consisting of the three villages Bröbberow, Klein Grenz and Groß Grenz.

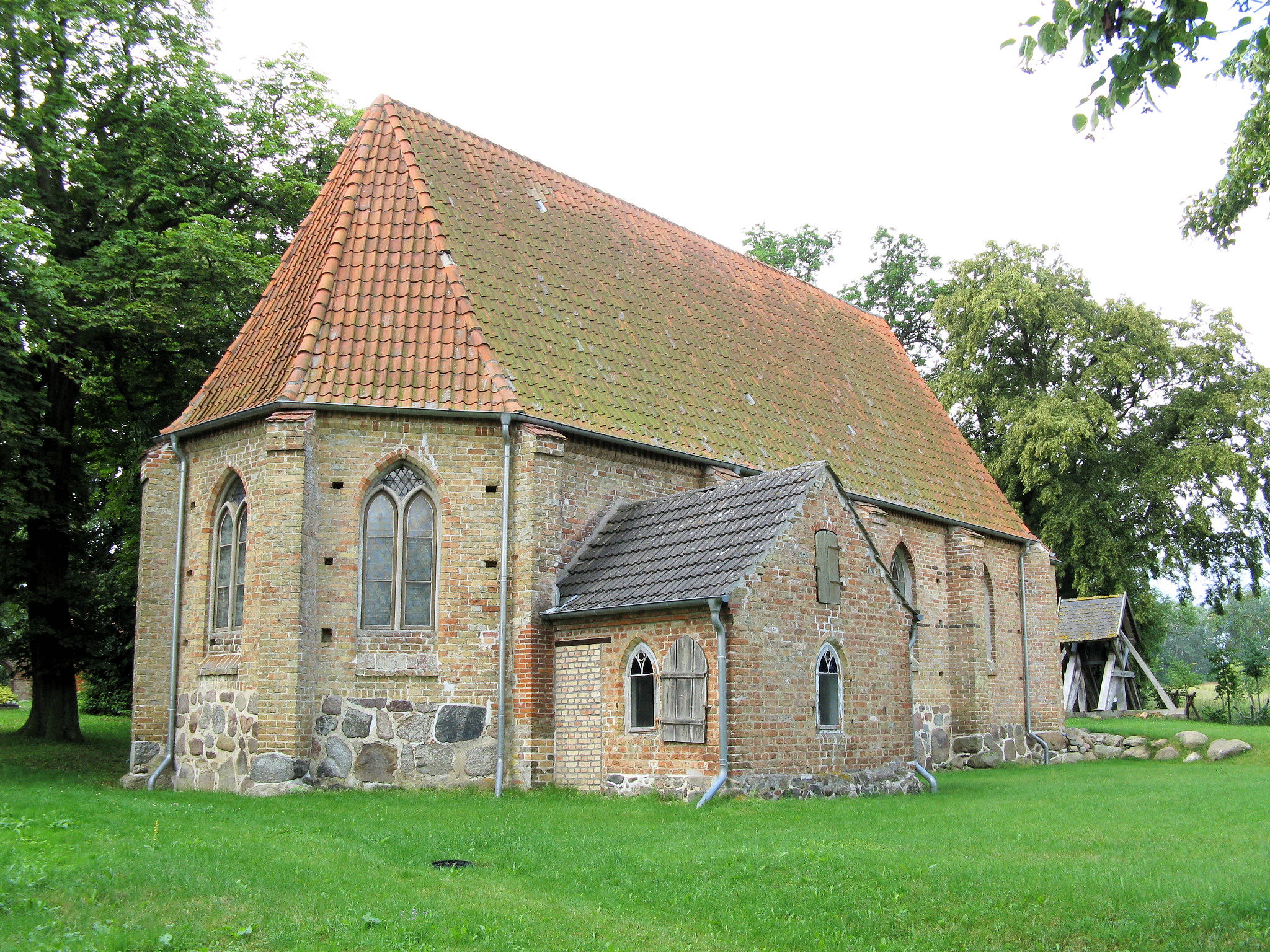
A church in Groß Grenz.
