= Henry, Duke of Mecklenburg-Stargard =

Duke of Mecklenburg-Stargard

- Born: before 1412
- Died: between 26 May and 20 August 1466
- Noble family: House of Mecklenburg
- Spouses: Judith of Werle-Waren; Ingeborg of Pomerania; Margaret of Brunswick-Lüneburg
- Father: Ulrich I, Duke of Mecklenburg-Stargard
- Mother: Margaret of Pomerania-Stettin

Henry, Duke of Mecklenburg-Stargard (before 1412 – 26 May/20 August 1466) was the ruling Duke of Mecklenburg-Stargard, including the Lordships of Neubrandenburg, Stargard, Strelitz and Wesenberg, from 1417 to 1466. He is sometimes called "Henry the Elder" to distinguish him from Duke Henry IV of Mecklenburg.

== Life ==
Henry was born before 1412 as the youngest child of Duke Ulrich I of Mecklenburg-Stargard and his wife Margaret. He ruled Neubrandenburg, initially under guardianship. In 1436 he and his cousin Duke John III of Mecklenburg-Stargard and Henry IV, Duke of Mecklenburg, inherited the Lordship of Werle. After John III's death, Henry ruled all of Mecklenburg-Stargard.

Henry was considered a warlike ruler. Thomas Kantzow called him "a wicked robber, who always bothers the Mark (i.e. Brandenburg) and the entire country all the way to Stettin, who was mad at all the cows, leaving Duke Joachim of Stettin wondering where he stored all the hides". During Henry's reign, the Peace of Wittstock was concluded, which permanently fixed the southeastern boundary of Mecklenburg.

== Marriage and issue ==
Henry married three times:

1. Jutta (d. 1427), the daughter of Lord Nicholas V of Werle-Waren
2. Ingeborg, a daughter of Duke Bogislaw VIII of Pomerania
3. Margaret (1442–1512), the daughter of Duke Frederick II, Duke of Brunswick-Lüneburg, whom he married in 1452

=== Issue ===
1. Ulrich II, Duke of Mecklenburg-Stargard
2. Margaret (died: before 1451)
3. Magdalene (died: 2 April 1532), married:
  1. Duke Wartislaw X of Pomerania
  2. Count Burchard V of Barby-Mühlingen
4. Anne, a nun in Ribnitz Abbey (died: 7 January 1498)

Henry, Duke of Mecklenburg-Stargard House of Mecklenburg Born: before 1412 Died: between 26 May 1466 and 20 August 1466
Preceded by Ulrich I	Duke of Mecklenburg-Stargard; 1417–1466	Succeeded by Ulrich II
