= John V of Werle =

- Born: between 1338 and 1340
- Died: before 9 September 1378
- Noble family: House of Mecklenburg
- Father: Nicholas III of Werle
- Mother: Agnes of Mecklenburg

Lord John V of Werle[-Güstrow] (born: between 1338 and 1340; died: before 9 September 1378) was co-regent of Werle-Güstrow from 1365 until his death.

He was the youngest son of Nicholas III Werle-Güstrow and his wife Agnes.

After his father's death in 1360 or 1361, his brother Lorenz ruled alone, probably because John was too young to rule. On 21 September 1365, Lorentz and John signed a deed together, suggesting that at that time, they were ruling jointly.

He married Euphemia, daughter of Henry III, Duke of Mecklenburg, but he remained childless and died young, before 9 September 1378.
