= John II of Werle =

- Born: after 1250
- Died: 27 August 1337
- Buried: Doberan Minster
- Noble family: House of Mecklenburg
- Spouse: Mechtild of Brunswick-Grubenhagen
- Issue Detail: Nicholas III of Werle; Bernard II of Werle
- Father: John I of Werle
- Mother: Sophie of Lindow-Ruppin

John II, Lord of Werle[-Güstrow] nicknamed The Bald (after 1250 – 27 August 1337), was from 1309 to 1316 co-regent of Werle and from 1316 to 1337 Lord of Werle-Güstrow. He was the second eldest son of John I of Werle and Sophie of Lindow-Ruppin.

He ruled Werle from 1309 to 1316 jointly with his brother Nicholas II. After Nicholas's death in 1316 it was decided to divide the territory, and John took control over part of the territory called Werle-Güstrow, and Nicholas's son John III, took control over the part called Werle-Goldberg.

On 4 May 1326, King Christopher II of Denmark promised to invest John and Lord Henry II of Mecklenburg with the Principality of Rügen. However, the Dukes of Pomerania took Rugen, leading to the Rügen War of Succession. Pomerania successfully defended Rügen, and Mecklenburg's claims on Rügen could not be enforced.

John II reduced his debts by prosecuting Jews for host desecration.

He died in 1337 and was buried in the Doberan Minster.

== Marriage and issue ==
In 1311, John II married Mechtild (born: c. 1295; died: between 24 October 1333 and 14 March 1344), a daughter of Duke Henry I of Brunswick-Grubenhagen. They had four children:

- Nicholas III, Lord of Werle-Güstrow
- Bernard II, Lord of Werle-Waren
- Sophia of Werle (1329–1364), married firstly, in 1341, with Albert IV of Saxe-Lauenburg and secondly, in 1344, with Barnim IV of Pomerania-Wolgast
- Anna of Werle, a nun in the Dobbertin Abbey

John II of Werle House of Mecklenburg Born: after 1250 Died: 27 August 1337
Preceded by Nicholas II	Lord of Werle; 1316–1337	Succeeded by Nicholas III as Lord of Werle-Güstrow
Preceded by Nicholas II	Lord of Werle; 1316–1337	Succeeded by Bernard II as Lord of Werle-Waren
