= Albert II of Mecklenburg-Stargard =

Albert II, Duke of Mecklenburg-Stargard
- Born: before
- Died: between 11 February 1421 and 4 October 1423
- Noble family: House of Mecklenburg
- Father: Ulrich I, Duke of Mecklenburg-Stargard
- Mother: Margaret of Pomerania-Stettin

Albert II, Duke of Mecklenburg-Stargard (before 1400 – between 11 February 1421 and 4 October 1423) was Duke of Mecklenburg-Stargard and Lord of Neubrandenburg, Lordship of Stargard, Strelitz and Wesenberg from 1417 until his death.

== Life ==
He was the eldest son of Ulrich I and his wife Margeret, the daughter of the Swantibor III of Pomerania-Stettin.

Albert II was probably born before 1400 and ruled. When his father died in 1417, he and his younger brother Henry inherited the Duchy of Mecklenburg-Stargard. Since they were minors, they stood under guardianship.

Albert is last mentioned as alive in a document dated 11 February 1421. In a document dated 4 October 1423, his younger brother is the sole Duke.

Albert was not married and probably had no children.
