= Balthasar of Werle =

- Born: circa 1375
- Died: 5 April 1421
- Buried: Cathedral in Güstrow
- Noble family: House of Mecklenburg
- Father: Lorenz of Werle-Güstrow
- Mother: Matilda of Werle-Goldberg

Balthasar, Lord of Werle-Güstrow (c. 1375 – 5 April 1421) was Lord of Werle-Güstrow from 1393 or 1394 to 1421 and Prince of Wenden from 1418. He was the eldest son of Lorenz of Werle and Matilda of Werle-Goldberg (d. before 17 December 1402).

After his father's death in 1393 or 1394, he initially ruled Werle-Güstrow alone, but probably together with his brother John VII from 11 December 1395 and from 1 May 1401 with his brother William. From 1 May 1418, the brothers called themselves Princes of Wenden after they found evidence of royal lineage in the chronicles of Bishop Otto of Havelberg.

Baltasar died on 5 April 1421 and was buried in the Cathedral in Güstrow.

He had been engaged to Agnes, daughter of Duke Bogislaw VI of Pomerania, but they never married. He was first married on 18 October 1397 to Euphemia (d. 16 October 1417), daughter of Duke Magnus I of Mecklenburg. He later married Heilwig, daughter of Count Gerhard VI of Holstein-Rendsburg (d. before 1436). Heilwig later married Dietrich of Oldenburg.

No children of Balthasar are known.

Balthasar of Werle House of Mecklenburg Born: circa 1375 Died: 5 April 1421
Preceded by Lorenz of Werle	Lord of Werle-Güstrow; 1393/94-1421	Succeeded by William of Werle
