= Franz Bunke =

German painter (1857–1939)

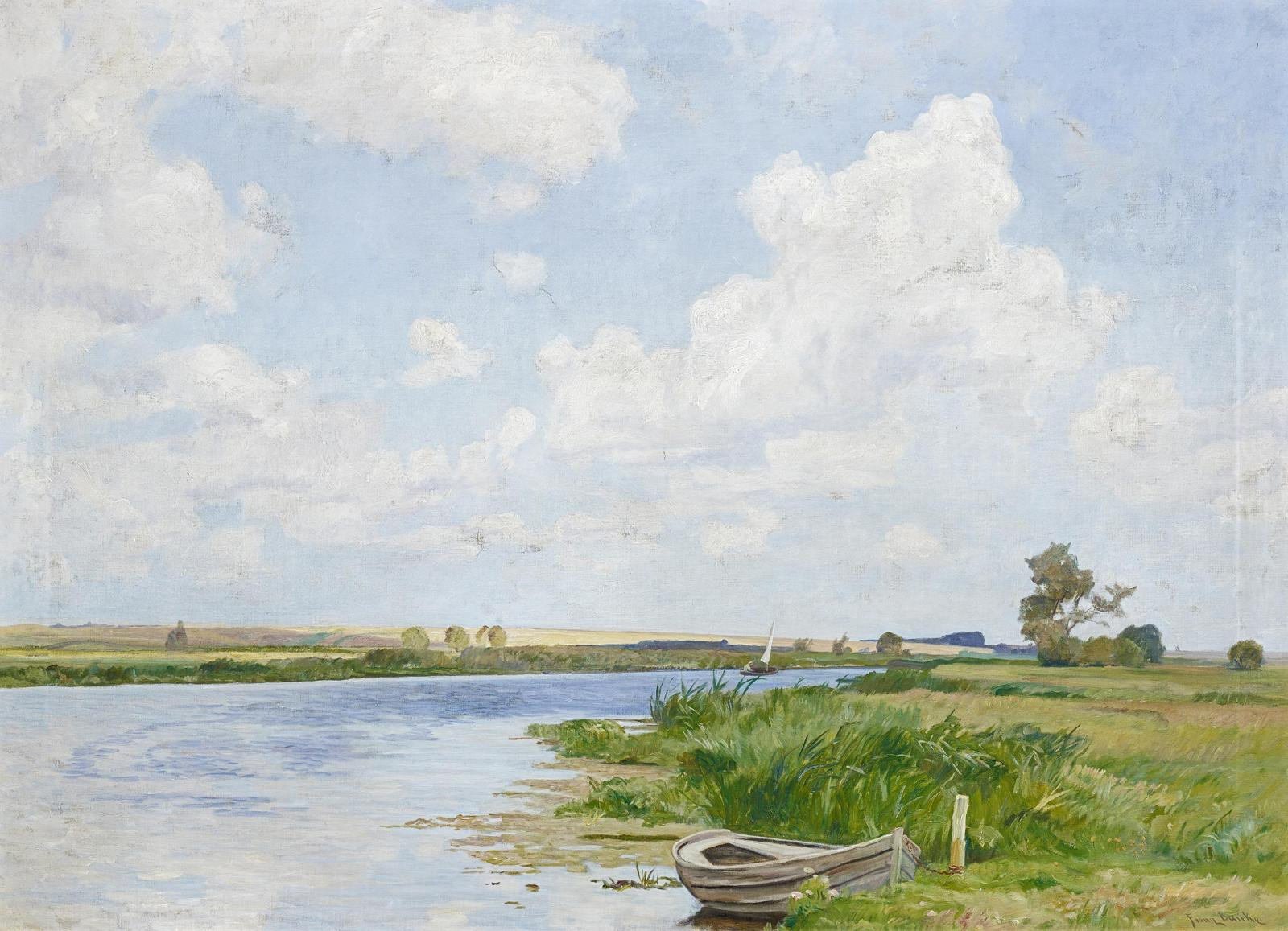
- Mecklenburg countryside by Franz Bunke
- Born: 3 December 1857; Schwaan, Mecklenburg-Strelitz
- Died: 6 July 1939 (aged 81); Weimar, Germany
- Known for: Painting
- Movement: Realism

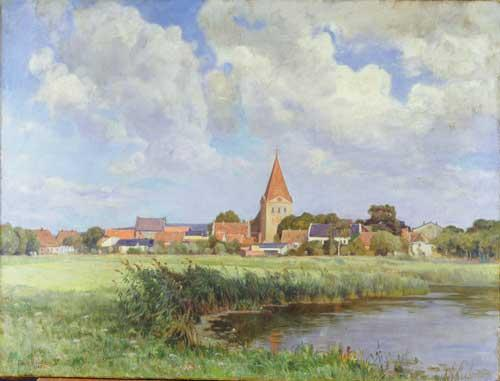
The Village of Schwaan (date unknown)

Franz Wilhelm Johann Bunke (3 December 1857 – 6 July 1939) was a German landscape painter.

== Life ==
Born in Schwaan, he was the son of a mill builder. In 1871, he began drawing lessons with Paul Tischbein in Rostock and attended a trade school after Tischbein's death.

In 1878, he entered the Prussian Academy of Arts in Berlin but, later that same year, he moved to the Weimar Saxon-Grand Ducal Art School. From 1882 to 1884 he was a Master Student of the landscape painter Theodor Hagen and became a teacher of landscape painting himself in 1886.

Beginning in 1892, he spent the summers in his home town of Schwaan and founded an art colony there. Every year, some of his students would accompany him and engage in plein-air painting. Occasionally, his fellow artists from the Academy would join him.

Prior to 1890, his works showed heavy influence from the Dutch Masters. His later works are notable for an almost reverential approach to depicting nature in detail. Among his favorite subjects were Schwaan, the surrounding villages and scenes along the Warnow River. From 1903 to 1914, he exhibited regularly at the Glaspalast (Munich).

He died in 1939 in Weimar.

== Honors ==
- 1880: Gold Medal for Fine Arts of the Karl-Alexander Foundation of Weimar.
- 1910: Appointed a Professor in 1910, by authority of Grand Duke Wilhelm Ernst.
- 1911: Grand Medal for Arts and Sciences of Friedrich Franz IV, in Schwerin.
- 1927: Made an honorary citizen of Schwaan, with a street named after him.
