= Schwaan (Amt) =

- Amt
- Map of Rostock highlighting Schwaan
- Interactive map of Schwaan
- Location within Germany Location within Mecklenburg-Vorpommern
- Coordinates: 53°56′N 12°06′E
- Country: Germany
- State: Mecklenburg-Vorpommern
- District: Rostock
- Seat: Schwaan
- Subdivisions: 7 municipalities

Area
  - Total: 122.36 km^{2} (47.24 sq mi)

Population (2025-12-31)
  - Total: 7,983
  - Density: 65.24/km^{2} (169.0/sq mi)
- Time zone: UTC+01:00 (CET)
  - Summer (DST): UTC+02:00 (CEST)
- Website: www.schwaan.de

Schwaan is an Amt in the district of Rostock, in Mecklenburg-Vorpommern, Germany. The seat of the Amt is in Schwaan.

The Amt Schwaan consists of the following municipalities:

1. Benitz
2. Bröbberow
3. Kassow
4. Rukieten
5. Schwaan
6. Vorbeck
7. Wiendorf
