= John II of Mecklenburg-Stargard =

John II, Duke of Mecklenburg-Stargard
- Born: before 1370
- Died: between 6 July and 9 October 1416 probably Sternberg
- Buried: Sternberg
- Noble family: House of Mecklenburg
- Spouse: Catherine of Lithuania
- Father: John I, Duke of Mecklenburg-Stargard
- Mother: Agnes of Lindow-Ruppin

John II, Duke of Mecklenburg-Stargard (before 1370 - 6 July/9 October 1416) was a titular Duke of Mecklenburg. He was co-ruler of Mecklenburg-Stargard from 1392 or 1393 to 1408 and the sole ruler of Sternberg, Friedland, Fürstenberg and Lychen from 1408 until his death.

== Family ==
He was the eldest child of John I, Duke of Mecklenburg-Stargard, and his third wife Agnes of Lindow-Ruppin.

== Life ==
John II was probably born before 1370 and reigned jointly with his younger brothers Ulrich I and Albert I (d. 1397).

He supported his cousin Albert III, who tried to enforce his rights as a king of Sweden. In this matter, he probably acted as a leader of the Victual Brothers.

In 1408 John divided his inheritance with his brother Ulrich. John II received the Lordships of Sternberg, Friedland, Fürstenberg and Lychen. He chose Sternberg as his residence, and probably died there, in 1416. He was also buried in Sternberg.

== Marriage and issue ==
In 1388, John II married Catherine ("Wilheida"), the daughter of Grand Duke Algirdas ("Olgierd") of Lithuania. They had three children:

1. Agnes, (d. 1467), married Duke Otto II of Pomerania
2. John III, who succeeded him as Duke of Mecklenburg-Stargard and Lord of Sternberg (1417–1438)
3. Anna (1390–1467), abbess in Ribnitz Abbey (1423–1467)

== Footnotes ==
John II of Mecklenburg-Stargard House of Mecklenburg Born: before 1370 Died: between 6 July and 9 October 1416
Preceded by John I	Duke of Mecklenburg-Stargard; 1393-1416; With: Ulrich I and Albert I	Succeeded by John III
