= Lorenz of Werle =

Lord of Werle-Güstrow (1360–1393)

Lorenz, Lord of Werle
- Born: between 1338 and 1340
- Died: between 24 February 1393 and 6 May 1394 (aged 52–56)
- Noble family: House of Mecklenburg
- Spouse: Matilda of Werle-Goldberg
- Issue: Balthasar of Werle; John VII of Werle; William of Werle
- Father: Nicholas III of Werle
- Mother: Agnes of Mecklenburg

Lorenz, Lord of Werle-Güstrow (between 1338 and 1340 – between 24 February 1393 and 6 May 1394) was Lord of Werle-Güstrow from 1360 to 1393 (or 1394). He was the eldest son of Nicholas III, Lord of Werle-Güstrow and Agnes of Mecklenburg.

After his father's death in 1360 or 1361, he initially ruled Werle-Gustrow alone. After 21 September 1365, he ruled jointly with his brother John V of Werle, as can be inferred from a deed they signed jointly on that date.

John died young, before 9 September 1378. From that date onwards, documents were again signed by Lorenz alone. Lorenz last signed a deed on 24 February 1393.

== Issue ==
He was married to Matilda (died before 17 December 1402), the daughter of Nicholas IV, Lord of Werle-Goldberg. They had the following children:

- Balthasar, lord of Werle-Güstrow,
- John VII, co-lord of Werle-Güstrow,
- William, Lord of Werle-Güstrow.

Lorenz of Werle House of Mecklenburg Born: between 1338 and 1340 Died: between 24 February 1393 and 6 May 1394
Preceded by Nicholas III	Lord of Werle-Güstrow; 1360–1393	Succeeded by Balthasar
