= Ulrich II of Mecklenburg-Stargard =

Ulrich II, Duke of Mecklenburg-Stargard
- Born: probably before 1428
- Died: 13 July 1471
- Buried: Wanzka Monastery
- Noble family: House of Mecklenburg
- Spouse: Catherine of Werle
- Father: Henry, Duke of Mecklenburg-Stargard
- Mother: Ingeborg of Pomerania

Ulrich II, Duke of Mecklenburg-Stargard (probably before 1428 – 13 July 1471) was ruling duke in the portion of the duchy of Mecklenburg designated Mecklenburg-Stargard from 1466 to 1471. He was the youngest child of Duke Henry, Duke of Mecklenburg-Stargard, and his wife Ingeborg of Pomerania.

== Life ==
Ulrich II was probably born before 1428 and reigned jointly with his father Henry. After his father's death in 1466 he assumed full power.

He was married to Catherine, daughter of Prince William of Werle. The marriage had been planned for 1446. However, it came about only after a lengthy dispute over the dowry. Through the mediation of Mayor Otto Voge of Stralsund, an amicable agreement, the Treaty of Ribnitz, was reached on 24 February 1454. The sticking point was a dispute over the share of Catherine's mother, Sophia of Pomerania, in the inheritance of her brother, Duke Barnim VIII of Pomerania, who had died in 1451. The Mecklenburg side claimed this share as a dowry for Catherine's wedding. This affected the Lordships of Barth, Zingst and Damgarten, which Barnim VIII had pledged to Catherine for 20000florins. The exact date of the wedding is not known, but probably between 24 February (the date of the treaty) and 15 September 1454 (the first documented mention of Catharine as his wife). Catharine was last mentioned on 21 July 1475.

Ulrich died in 1471; there were rumours that he was poisoned. He was buried in Wanzka Monastery. As he had no male heirs, Stargard fell back to the line of Henry IV, Duke of Mecklenburg, who already ruled the rest of Mecklenburg.

== Issue ==
1. Ingeborg (died probably 8 April 1509), married Eberwin II of Bentheim
2. Elisabeth (died 1532), Prioress of Rehna Abbey

Ulrich II of Mecklenburg-Stargard House of Mecklenburg Born: before 1428 Died: 13 July 1471
Preceded by Henry	Duke of Mecklenburg-Stargard; 1466-1471	Succeeded by Henry IV as Duke of Mecklenburg
