= Treaty of Templin =

1317 treaty between Brandenburg and Denmark

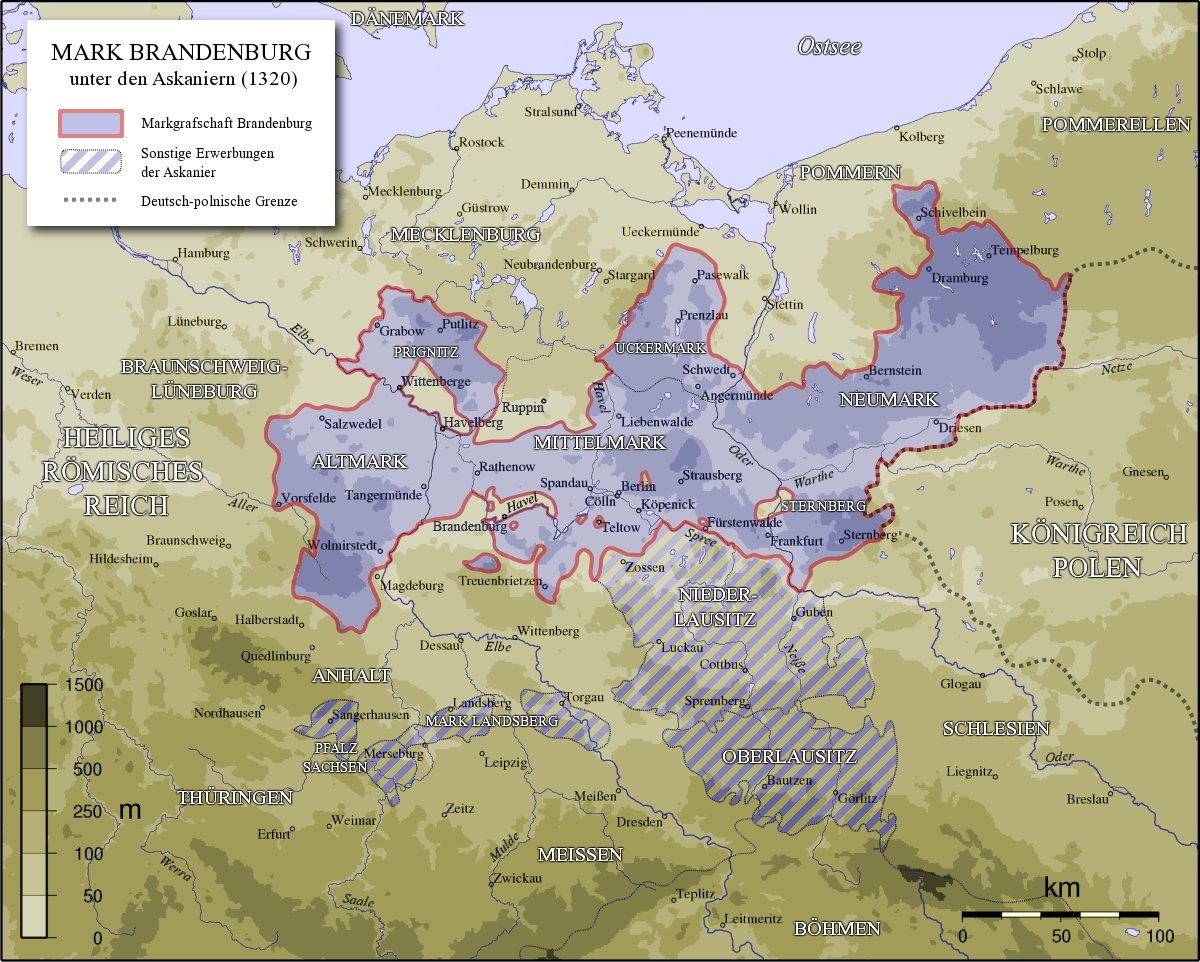
- Brandenburg in 1320
- Type: Legal status and succession in the Lands of Stargard and Schlawe-Stolp
- Signed: 25 November 1317
- Location: Templin, Brandenburg
- Signatories: Margrave Waldemar of Brandenburg; King Eric VI of Denmark; Prince Henry II of Mecklenburg
- Parties: House of Ascania; House of Estridsen; House of Mecklenburg

The Treaty of Templin was concluded on 24/25 November 1317, ending a war between the Margraviate of Brandenburg and Denmark, the latter leading a North German alliance. During this war, Brandenburgian margrave Waldemar (also Woldemar) and his troops were decisively defeated in the 1316 Battle of Gransee, fought at Schulzendorf between Rheinsberg and Gransee. After the battle, Brandenburg was forced to negotiate a truce. The treaty of Templin was signed a year later by Danish king Eric VI Menved, his ally duke Henry II of Mecklenburg ("the Lion"), and Waldemar.

Brandenburg had to transfer the terra Burg Stargard, that she had won from the Duchy of Pomerania in 1236 (Treaty of Kremmen), to Mecklenburg. This area would stay with Mecklenburg ever since, from 1701 held by the Dukes of Mecklenburg-Strelitz. Brandenburg also had to level Arnsberg (also "Ahrensberg") castle, and surrender the territories of Schlawe-Stolp (gained from the Principality of Rugia in 1277 and the Teutonic Knights in 1309, after the Treaty of Soldin) to Pomerania-Wolgast.

== See also ==
- List of treaties
