= Wiendorf =

- Municipality
- Coat of arms

- Location of Wiendorf within Rostock district
- Interactive map of Wiendorf
- Location within Germany Location within Mecklenburg-Vorpommern
- Coordinates: 53°56′N 12°9′E
- Country: Germany
- State: Mecklenburg-Vorpommern
- District: Rostock
- Municipal assoc.: Schwaan

Government
  - Mayor: Heinrich Bandlow

Area
  - Total: 17.62 km^{2} (6.80 sq mi)
- Elevation: 30 m (98 ft)

Population (2025-12-31)
  - Total: 822
  - Density: 46.7/km^{2} (121/sq mi)
- Time zone: UTC+01:00 (CET)
  - Summer (DST): UTC+02:00 (CEST)
- Postal codes: 18258
- Dialling codes: 03844
- Vehicle registration: LRO
- Website: www.amt-schwaan.de

Wiendorf is a municipality in the district of Rostock , in Mecklenburg-Vorpommern, Germany.
