= Marie Hager =

German artist

- Born: 20 March 1872; Penzlin, German Empire
- Died: 25 April 1947 (aged 75); Burg Stargard, Soviet occupation zone
- Known for: Painting

Marie Hager (1872–1947) was a German artist.

== Biography ==
Hager was born on 20 March 1872 in Penzlin, Germany. Hager exhibited regularly and was often commissioned to create specific city- or town-scapes. She was a member of the Allgemeinen Deutschen Künstlergenossenschaft (General German Artists' Cooperative), the Vereins Berliner Künstlerinnen (Association of Berlin Women Artists), and the Mecklenburger Künstlerbundes (Mecklenburg Artists Association). She died on 25 April 1947 in Burg Stargard.

== Legacy ==
In 1991 her home at Dewitzer Chaussee 17, Burg Stargard, along with more than 30 of Hager's landscape paintings were donated to the town by Hager's niece. In 1996 the Marie Hager House was created as a memorial and gallery for Hager's work.

== Gallery ==
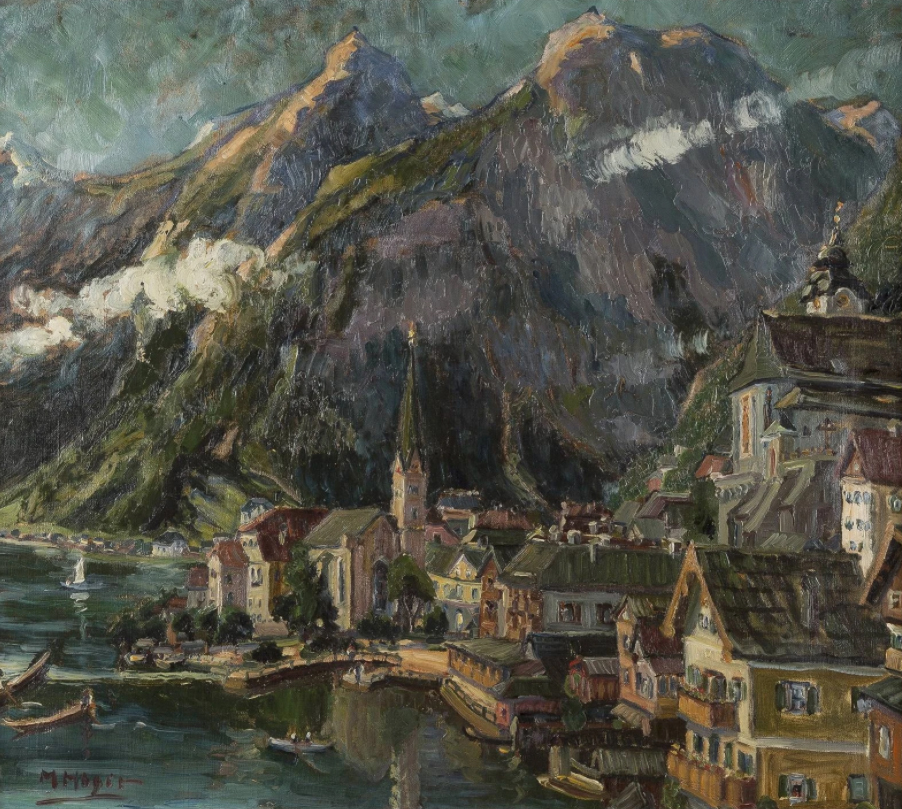
Lake Hallstatt

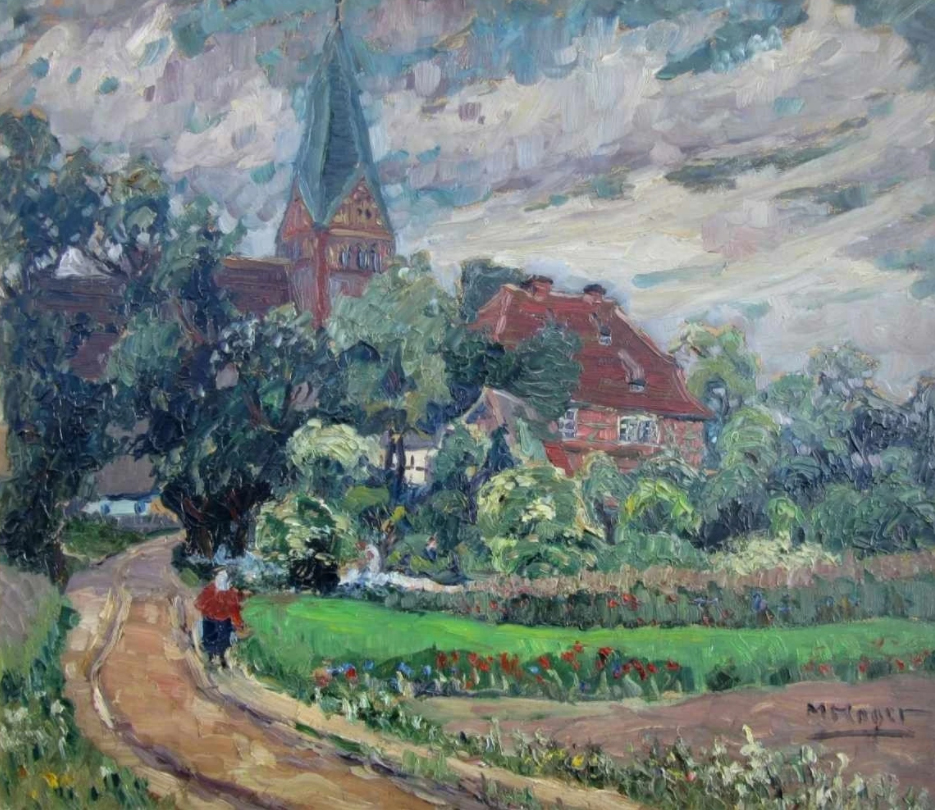
Church and rectory in Zarnekow

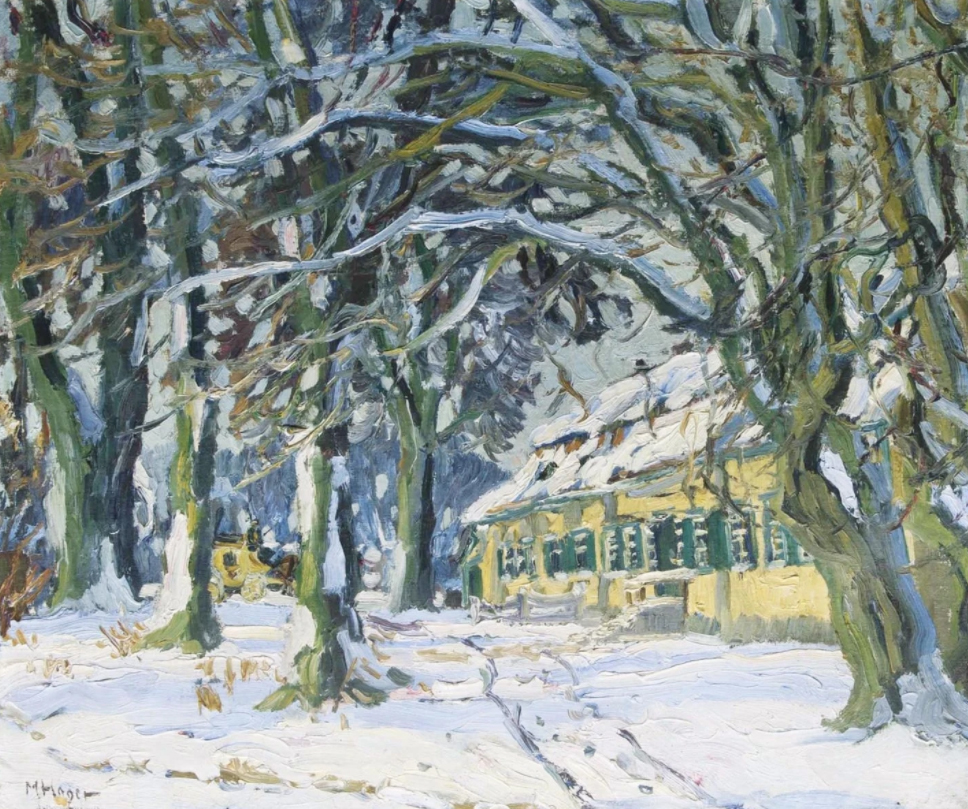
Snowy Alley
