= Benitz =

- Municipality
- Location of Benitz within Rostock district
- Interactive map of Benitz
- Location within Germany Location within Mecklenburg-Vorpommern
- Coordinates: 53°58′N 12°6′E
- Country: Germany
- State: Mecklenburg-Vorpommern
- District: Rostock
- Municipal assoc.: Schwaan

Government
  - Mayor: Rainer Mohsakowski

Area
  - Total: 9.50 km^{2} (3.67 sq mi)
- Elevation: 13 m (43 ft)

Population (2025-12-31)
  - Total: 410
  - Density: 43/km^{2} (110/sq mi)
- Time zone: UTC+01:00 (CET)
  - Summer (DST): UTC+02:00 (CEST)
- Postal codes: 18258
- Dialling codes: 03844
- Vehicle registration: LRO
- Website: www.amt-schwaan.de

Benitz is a municipality in the Rostock district, in Mecklenburg-Vorpommern, Germany.

In 1270, this toponym was recorded as Benizdorp, and, in 1286, as Beens.
