= Bernard II of Werle =

Lord of Werle

Bernhard II, Lord of Werle
- Born: c. 1320
- Died: between 16 January and 13 April 1382
- Noble family: House of Mecklenburg
- Father: John II of Werle
- Mother: Matilda of Brunswick-Grubenhagen

Bernard II, Lord of Werle [-Güstrow] (born: c. 1320; died: between 16 January 1382 and 13 April 1382) was from 1339 to 1347 Lord of Werle-Güstrow, from 1347 to 1382 Lord of Werle-Waren and from 1374 also Lord of Werle-Goldberg.

He was the youngest son of John II of Werle [-Güstrow] and his wife Matilda of Brunswick-Grubenhagen.

After the death of his father John II in 1337, his brother Nicholas III ruled Werle alone, until Bernard came of age in 1339. They then ruled jointly until 1347. On 14 June 1347, Werle was divided, with Bernard taking Werle-Waren. In 1374, John IV of Werle-Goldberg died, and Bernard inherited his territory.

He was last mentioned as living in a document dated 16 January 1382.

== Marriage and issue ==
He married in 1341 with Elisabeth (died between 1391 and 1410), a daughter of Count John "the Mild" of the Holstein-Plön. They had three children:

- John VI of Werle-Waren
- Mirislava Werle-Waren, who became a nun
- Matilde of Werle-Waren, married on 26 February 1377 Henry III of Mecklenburg

Bernard II of Werle House of Mecklenburg Born: c. 1320 Died: between 16 January and 13 April 1382
Preceded by John II	Lord of Werle-Waren; 1347-1382	Succeeded by John VI
Preceded by John IV	Lord of Werle-Goldberg; 1374-1382	Succeeded by John VI
