= Rukieten =

- Municipality
- Location of Rukieten within Rostock district
- Interactive map of Rukieten
- Location within Germany Location within Mecklenburg-Vorpommern
- Coordinates: 53°53′N 12°8′E
- Country: Germany
- State: Mecklenburg-Vorpommern
- District: Rostock
- Municipal assoc.: Schwaan

Government
  - Mayor: Frank Becker

Area
  - Total: 12.39 km^{2} (4.78 sq mi)
- Elevation: 32 m (105 ft)

Population (2025-12-31)
  - Total: 346
  - Density: 27.9/km^{2} (72.3/sq mi)
- Time zone: UTC+01:00 (CET)
  - Summer (DST): UTC+02:00 (CEST)
- Postal codes: 18258
- Dialling codes: 038453
- Vehicle registration: LRO
- Website: www.amt-schwaan.de

Rukieten is a municipality in the Rostock district, in Mecklenburg-Vorpommern, Germany.
