= John III of Werle =

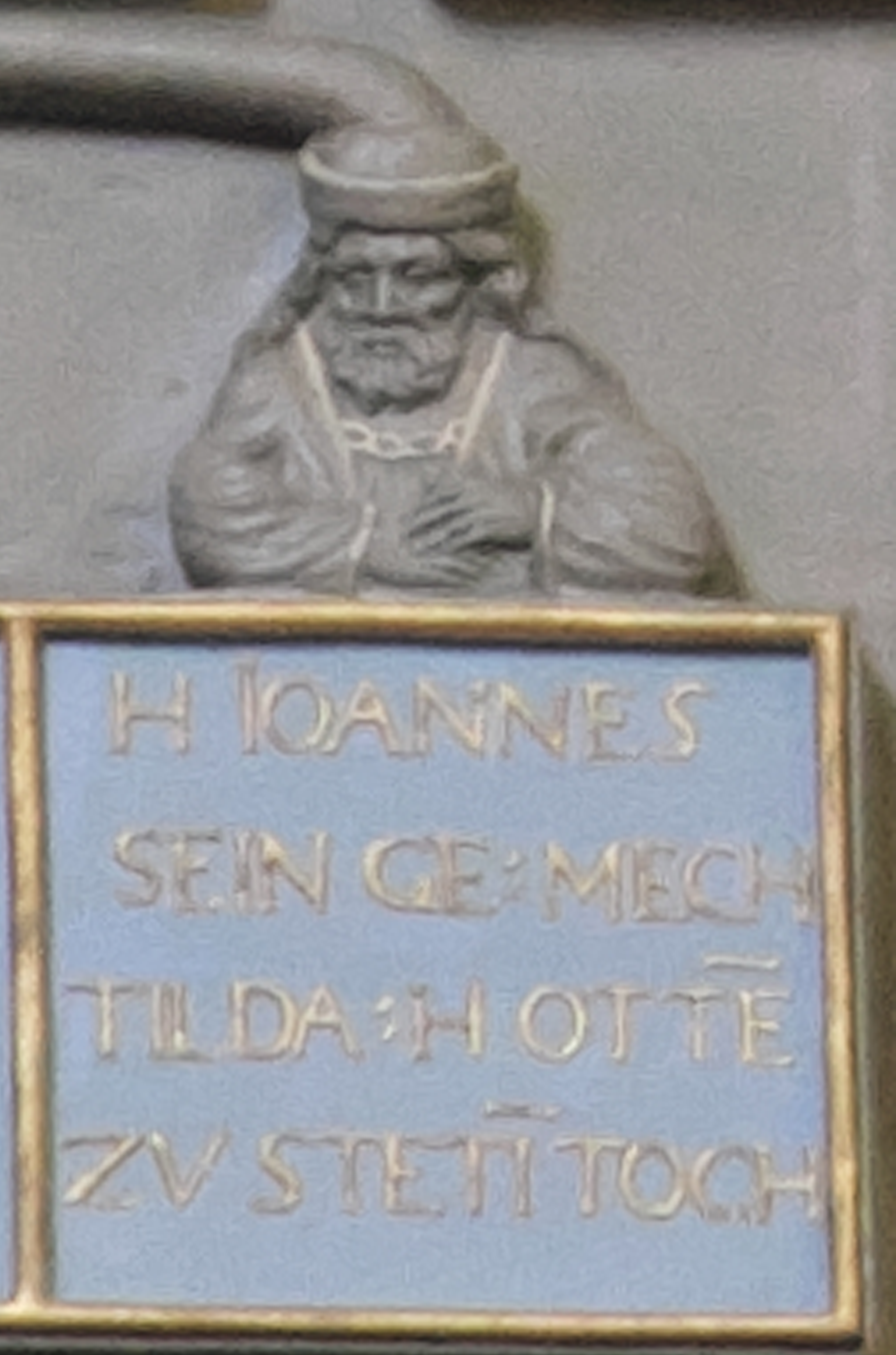
- Born: before 1300
- Died: between 1 April and 28 August 1352
- Noble family: House of Mecklenburg
- Spouse: Matilda of Pomerania
- Issue Detail: Nicholas IV of Werle
- Father: Nicholas II of Werle
- Mother: Rixa of Denmark

John III, Lord of Werle (nicknamed John van Ruoden; born: before 1300; died: between 1 April and 28 August 1352) was Lord of Werle-Goldberg from 1316 until his death. He was the son of Nicholas II and Rixa of Denmark.

After the death of his father, Nicholas II, in 1316, it was decided to divide Werle. John III. took control over the part Werle-Goldberg and his uncle John II took over Werle-Güstrow. John III built himself a castle in Goldberg. King Christopher II of Denmark promised John and Lord Henry II of Mecklenburg on 4 May 1326 that he would invest them with Rügen. However, he had earlier promised the principality to Pomerania. This led to a war, the Rügen War of Succession. Under the Peace of Brudersdorf, Pomerania was allowed to keep Rügen, but had to pay Mecklenburg 31000silver marks in compensation.

From 1350, he left the business of government to his son and co-ruler Nicholas IV. On 1 April 1352, he was already terminally ill. He died later that year. He was probably buried in Malchow Abbey.

== Marriage and issue ==
John III married in 1317 with Mechtild (died: c. 1332), the daughter of Duke Otto I, Duke of Pomerania. They had three children:

- John (died 1341)
- Nicholas IV, Lord of Werle-Goldberg
- Mechtild (died 1361), married with Count Otto I of Schwerin

After Mechtild's death, John III married Richaris and had two more daughters:

- Sophia (died 1384), married with Albert II of Lindow-Ruppin
- Rixa, became prioress of Dobbertin Abbey in 1392

John III of Werle House of Mecklenburg Born: before 1300 Died: between 1 April and 28 August 1352
Preceded by Nocholas II	Lord of Werle-Goldberg; 1316-1352	Succeeded by Nocholas IV
