= Vorbeck =

- Municipality
- Location of Vorbeck within Rostock district
- Interactive map of Vorbeck
- Location within Germany Location within Mecklenburg-Vorpommern
- Coordinates: 53°54′N 12°3′E
- Country: Germany
- State: Mecklenburg-Vorpommern
- District: Rostock
- Municipal assoc.: Schwaan

Government
  - Mayor: Ulrich Bauer

Area
  - Total: 15.59 km^{2} (6.02 sq mi)
- Elevation: 14 m (46 ft)

Population (2025-12-31)
  - Total: 407
  - Density: 26.1/km^{2} (67.6/sq mi)
- Time zone: UTC+01:00 (CET)
  - Summer (DST): UTC+02:00 (CEST)
- Postal codes: 18258
- Dialling codes: 03844
- Vehicle registration: LRO
- Website: www.amt-schwaan.de

Vorbeck is a municipality in the Rostock district, in Mecklenburg-Vorpommern, Germany.
