= Mecklenburg-Stargard =

Duchy

Duchy of Mecklenburg-Stargard Herzogtum Mecklenburg-Stargard (German)
- 1352–1471
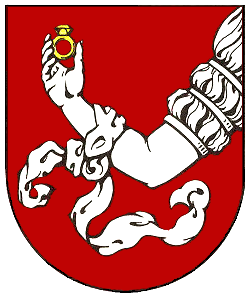
- Coat of arms

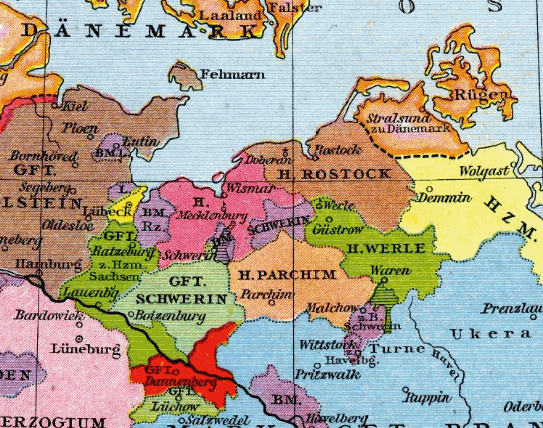
- Mecklenburg c. 1230 (pink)
- Status: Partition of the Mecklenburg; State of the Holy Roman Empire
- Capital: Burg Stargard; 53°29′N 13°18′E
- Government: Monarchy
- Duke
  - 1352–1392/93: John I, first
  - 1466–1471: Ulrich II, last
- History
  - Established: 1352
  - Disestablished: 1471
Preceded by	Succeeded by
Mecklenburg-Schwerin	Duchy of Mecklenburg
- Today part of: Germany

The Duchy of Mecklenburg-Stargard, (Note: German: (Teil-)Herzogtum Mecklenburg-Stargard) also simply known as Mecklenburg-Stargard, and also as the Duchy of Stargard (Note: Latin: Ducatus Stargardensis) was a feudal district duchy in Mecklenburg within the Holy Roman Empire. Its capital was Burg Stargard. It was ruled by the House of Mecklenburg. The state was formed in 1352 from part of the Duchy of Mecklenburg-Schwerin, and existed until 1471, when it was incorporated into the Duchy of Mecklenburg.

The main part of the Duchy of Mecklenburg-Stargard comprised the Lordship of Stargard in what is now the state of Mecklenburg-Western Pomerania, an area in the border area between Brandenburg, Pomerania and Mecklenburg. The lordship was named after the medieval castle in Stargard. Smaller areas were Sternberg and the Eldenburg with the historic country Ture.

== List of dukes ==
- John I, Duke (1352–1392/93)
- Albert I, Duke (1392/93–1397)
- John II, Duke (1392/93–1416)
- Ulrich I, Duke (1392/93–1417)
- John III, Duke (1416–1438)
- Albert II, co-Duke (1417–1421/23)
- Henry I Gaunt, Duke (1417–1466)
- Ulrich II, Duke (1466–1471)
inherited by Mecklenburg-Schwerin to unite Mecklenburg

== See also ==
- Burg Stargard
- List of rulers of Mecklenburg
