= Albert III of Brandenburg-Salzwedel =

Margrave of Brandenburg (c. 1250–1300)

Albert III, Margrave of Brandenburg-Salzwedel
- Born: c. 1250
- Died: 4 December 1300
- Buried: Lehnin Abbey
- Noble family: House of Ascania
- Spouse: Matilda of Denmark
- Father: Otto III, Margrave of Brandenburg
- Mother: Beatrice of Bohemia

Albert III, Margrave of Brandenburg-Salzwedel (c. 1250 – between 19 November and 4 December 1300) was a Margrave of Brandenburg. He was a member of the Brandenburg-Salzwedel branch of the House of Ascania, which existed from 1266 to 1317. He was a son of Otto III and his wife, Beatrice (or Božena) of Bohemia.

As a son of Otto, he was entitled to use the title of Margrave and he did sign some official documents, but he was never more than a co-ruler. The real power was wielded by his cousin Otto IV "with the arrow". Albert III administered the Lordship of Stargard, which Brandenburg had acquired from Pomerania in 1236. Albert III was from 1284 the sole ruler of Stargard and Lychen. After his sons Otto and John died (around 1299), Albert III sold Stargard to his son-in-law Henry II of Mecklenburg. The 1304 Treaty of Vietmannsdorf confirmed Henry II as Lord a Stargard and enshrined that it was held as a fief from Brandenburg.

In 1299, a year before his death, he founded the Cistercian monastery Coeli Porta ("Gate to Heaven") in Lychen.

Albert III died on 3 December 1300 and was initially buried at Lehnin Abbey. In 1309, his body was transferred to the Coeli Porta monastery. It was subsequently lost.

== Marriage and issue ==
Albert III married in 1268 to Matilda (died 1300), a daughter of King Christopher I of Denmark. They had the following children:

- Otto (before 1276 – 1299)
- John (died 1299)
- Beatrix (d. 22 September 1314), married Lord Henry II of Mecklenburg
- Margaret (died in 1315, without issue), married:

1. in 1291 to King Przemysł II of Poland (1257–1296)
2. in 1302 to Duke Albert III of Saxe-Lauenburg (died 1309), co-ruler of Saxe-Lauenburg
