= Albert I of Mecklenburg-Stargard =

Albert I, Duke of Mecklenburg-Stargard
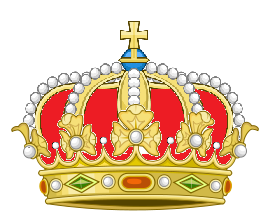
- Born: 1367
- Died: between 11 February and 15 July 1397; Dorpat
- Noble family: House of Mecklenburg
- Father: John I, Duke of Mecklenburg-Stargard
- Mother: Agnes of Lindow-Ruppin

Albert I, Duke of Mecklenburg-Stargard (before 1377 – between 11 February and 15 July 1397) was Duke of Mecklenburg-Stargard from 1392 until his death and also Coadjutor of the Bishopric of Dorpat.

== Life ==
He was the youngest child of Duke John I and his third wife Agnes of Lindow-Ruppin.

Albrecht I was probably born in 1367. After his father's death, he ruled Mecklenburg-Stargard jointly with his elder brothers John II and Ulrich I. In 1395 he moved to Livonia to become coadjutor to bishop Dietrich Damerau of Dorpat. He settles a dispute between his bishop and Konrad von Jungingen, the Grand Master of the Teutonic Knights. Early in 1396, Konrad writes in his diary: the bishop of Dorpat has invited one of the Lord of Mecklenburg and given him several castles and intends him to succeed to the bishopric.

Albert died in Dorpat between 11 February and 15 July and was buried there.
