= John VI of Werle =

John VI, Lord of Werle
- Born: after 1341
- Died: between 1385 and 1395
- Noble family: House of Mecklenburg
- Spouse: Agnes of Werle
- Father: Bernard II of Werle
- Mother: Elizabeth of Holstein-Plön

John VI, Lord of Werle-Waren-Goldberg (born: after 1341; died: after 16 October 1385) was Lord of Werle-Goldberg from 1382 to 1385.

He was the son of Bernard II of Werle and Elizabeth, daughter of John III, Count of Holstein-Plön.

He reigned only along with his father and after his father's death in 1382 alone, over the Lordships of Werle-Goldberg and Werle-Waren. He was married to Agnes, daughter of Nicholas IV of Werle-Goldberg. It is not known when he died. In a document dated 16 October 1385, he is mentioned as being alive. He is known to have died before 1395.

== Children ==
- Nicholas V, Lord of Werle-Waren-Goldberg
- Christopher, Lord of Werle-Waren-Goldberg
- Agnes, a nun at Malchow, (died after 21 October 1449)
- Mirislava, (died after 28 November 1436)

John VI of Werle House of Mecklenburg Born: after 1341 Died: between 1385 and 1395
Preceded by Bernard II	Lord of Werle-Waren-Goldberg; 1382 — between 1385 and 1395	Succeeded by Nicholas V
