= Kassow =

- Municipality
- Location of Kassow within Rostock district
- Interactive map of Kassow
- Location within Germany Location within Mecklenburg-Vorpommern
- Coordinates: 53°52′42″N 12°04′20″E
- Country: Germany
- State: Mecklenburg-Vorpommern
- District: Rostock
- Municipal assoc.: Schwaan

Government
  - Mayor: Petra Rohloff

Area
  - Total: 14.33 km^{2} (5.53 sq mi)
- Elevation: 13 m (43 ft)

Population (2025-12-31)
  - Total: 371
  - Density: 25.9/km^{2} (67.1/sq mi)
- Time zone: UTC+01:00 (CET)
  - Summer (DST): UTC+02:00 (CEST)
- Postal codes: 18258
- Dialling codes: 03844
- Vehicle registration: LRO
- Website: www.amt-schwaan.de

Kassow is a municipality in the Rostock district, in Mecklenburg-Vorpommern, Germany.
