= Nicholas III of Werle =

- Born: after 1311 and before 1337
- Died: between 10 August 1360 and 1 August 1361
- Noble family: House of Mecklenburg
- Spouses: Agnes of Mecklenburg; Matilda of Holstein-Plön
- Issue Detail: Lorenz of Werle; John V of Werle
- Father: John II of Werle
- Mother: Matilda of Brunswick

Nicholas III, Lord of Werle-Güstrow, nicknamed Staveleke (between 1311 and 1337 – between 10 August 1360 and 1 August 1361), was Lord of Werle-Güstrow from 1337 to 1360. He was the eldest son of John II of Werle and Matilda of Brunswick.

After the death of his father in 1337, he ruled alone until 1339, at which point he ruled jointly with his brother Bernard II of Werle until 1347. In 1347, they split their inheritance, with Bernard II receiving Werle-Waren and Nicholas III retaining the smaller Werle-Güstrow. He is last mentioned in a document dated 10 August 1360 and probably died a short time later.

== Marriages and issue ==
Nicholas married on 6 January 1338 Agnes (1320–1340), daughter of Lord Henry II of Mecklenburg. They had two children:

- Lorenz of Werle-Güstrow
- John V of Werle-Güstrow

After 1341, he married Matilda, daughter of Count John III of Holstein-Plön. They had one child:

- Catherine of Werle-Güstrow (died 17 December 1402), married, probably in 1366, Albert V, Duke of Saxe-Lauenburg

Nicholas III of Werle House of Mecklenburg
Preceded by John II	Lord of Werle-Güstrow; 1337-1360; With: Bernard II (1339–1349)	Succeeded by Lorenz
