= Blankensee, Mecklenburg =

Blankensee
- Municipality
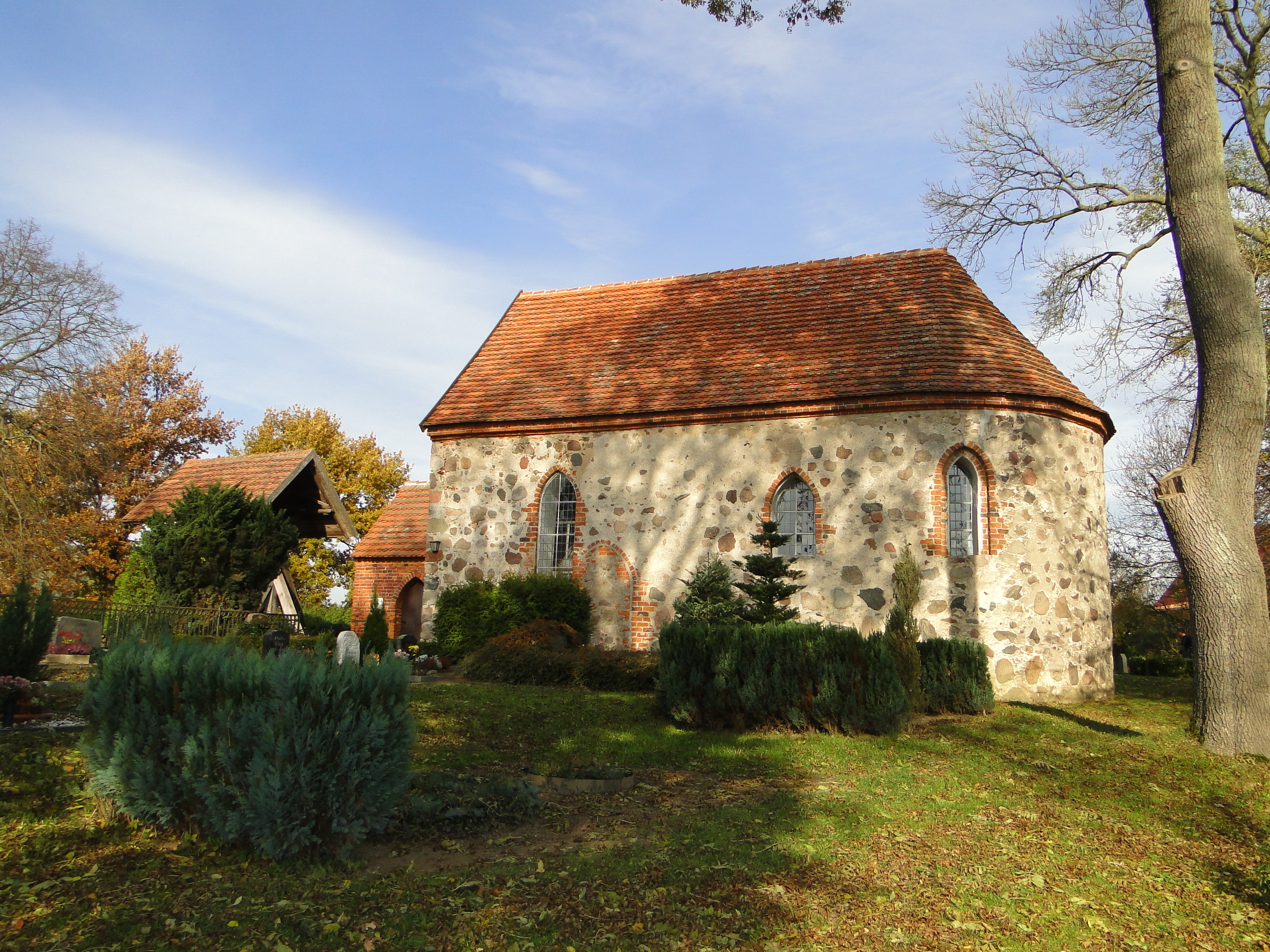
- Medieval church in Blankensee

- Location of Blankensee within Mecklenburgische Seenplatte district
- Interactive map of Blankensee
- Location within Germany Location within Mecklenburg-Vorpommern
- Coordinates: 53°24′N 13°15′E
- Country: Germany
- State: Mecklenburg-Vorpommern
- District: Mecklenburgische Seenplatte
- Municipal assoc.: Neustrelitz-Land

Government
  - Mayor: Wulf Bednorz

Area
  - Total: 56.04 km^{2} (21.64 sq mi)
- Elevation: 80 m (260 ft)

Population (2025-12-31)
  - Total: 1,485
  - Density: 26.50/km^{2} (68.63/sq mi)
- Time zone: UTC+01:00 (CET)
  - Summer (DST): UTC+02:00 (CEST)
- Postal codes: 17237
- Dialling codes: 039821, 039826
- Vehicle registration: MST
- Website: www.amtneustrelitz-land.de

Blankensee is a municipality in the Mecklenburgische Seenplatte district, in Mecklenburg-Vorpommern, Germany.
