= William of Werle =

- Born: before 1394
- Died: 8 September 1436; Güstrow
- Noble family: House of Mecklenburg
- Spouses: Anna of Anhalt; Sophie of Pomerania
- Issue: Catherine of Werle
- Father: Lorenz of Werle
- Mother: Matilda of Werle-Goldberg

William of Werle (before 1393 or 1394 – 8 September 1436) was co-regent of Werle from 1418 to 1425, then the sole ruler from 1425 until his death. After 1426, he called himself "Prince of the Wends". He was a son of Lorenz of Werle-Güstrow and his wife Matilda of Werle-Goldberg.

== Life ==
After the death of his father Lorenz in 1393 or 1394, William's older brother Balthasar ruled Werle-Güstrow alone until William became co-regent in 1418. When Balthasar died on 5 April 1421, William became the sole ruler of Werle-Güstrow. When Christopher of Werle-Waren died in 1425, he became ruler of all of Werle. After 1426, he styled himself "Prince of the Wends, Lord of Güstrow, Waren and Werle".

== Marriage and issue ==
William first married in 1422 to Anna of Anhalt (daughter of Albert IV, Prince of Anhalt-Köthen), who died in 1426. He then married Sophie of Pomerania, the sister of Duke Barnim VIII of Pomerania. With her he had one child, Catherine of Werle, who married Duke Ulrich II of Mecklenburg-Stargard. With the consent of his cousins, Catherine's uncle Barnim VII mortgaged the territories of Barth, Zingst and Damgarten for 20,000 guilders for Catherine's dowry.

With the death of William, the Werle line died out in the male line, and the principality of Werle was returned to the House of Mecklenburg. The rulers of Mecklenburg kept using the title of "Prince of the Wends" until the German monarchy was abolished in 1918.

== Footnotes ==
William of Werle House of Mecklenburg Born: before 1394 Died: 8 September 1436
Preceded by Balthasar	Lord of Werle; 1401–1436	Succeeded by Henry IV as Duke of Mecklenburg
