= Schwaan =

Town in Mecklenburg-Vorpommern, Germany

- Town
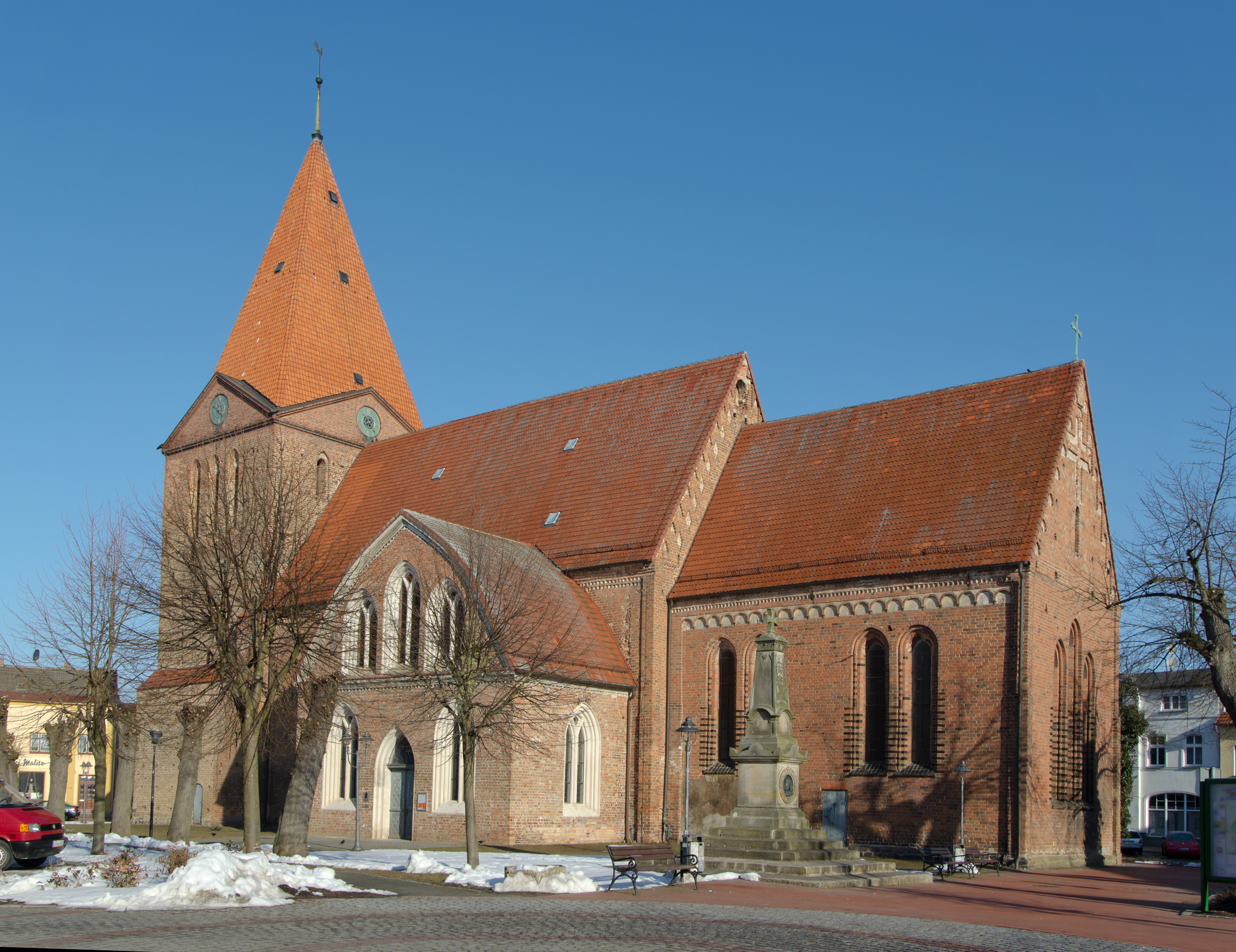
- St. Paul Church of Schwaan

- Coat of arms

- Location of Schwaan within Rostock district
- Interactive map of Schwaan
- Location within Germany Location within Mecklenburg-Vorpommern
- Coordinates: 53°56′20″N 12°6′25″E
- Country: Germany
- State: Mecklenburg-Vorpommern
- District: Rostock
- Municipal assoc.: Schwaan

Government
  - Mayor: Peter Faix

Area
  - Total: 38.28 km^{2} (14.78 sq mi)
- Elevation: 4 m (13 ft)

Population (2025-12-31)
  - Total: 4,958
  - Density: 129.5/km^{2} (335.5/sq mi)
- Time zone: UTC+01:00 (CET)
  - Summer (DST): UTC+02:00 (CEST)
- Postal codes: 18258
- Dialling codes: 03844
- Vehicle registration: LRO
- Website: www.amt-schwaan.de

Schwaan (German pronunciation: [ʃvaːn]) is a municipality in the Rostock district, in Mecklenburg-Vorpommern, Germany. It is also the seat of the Schwaan Township, serving another six municipalities.

The town is famous for being a traditional art colony.

== Geography ==
The area around Schwaan is part of the vast North European Plain, stretching from western France to Russia. Schwaan lies on the lower Warnow river between the cities of Rostock, 17 km to the north, and Güstrow, 20 km to the south. The higher ground to the east and west of the Warnow barely reaches 50 meters above sea level, and the area north to the Baltic Sea is flat.

The nearby villages of Bandow, Dorf Tatschow, Hof Tatschow and Letschow belong to Schwaan.

== History ==
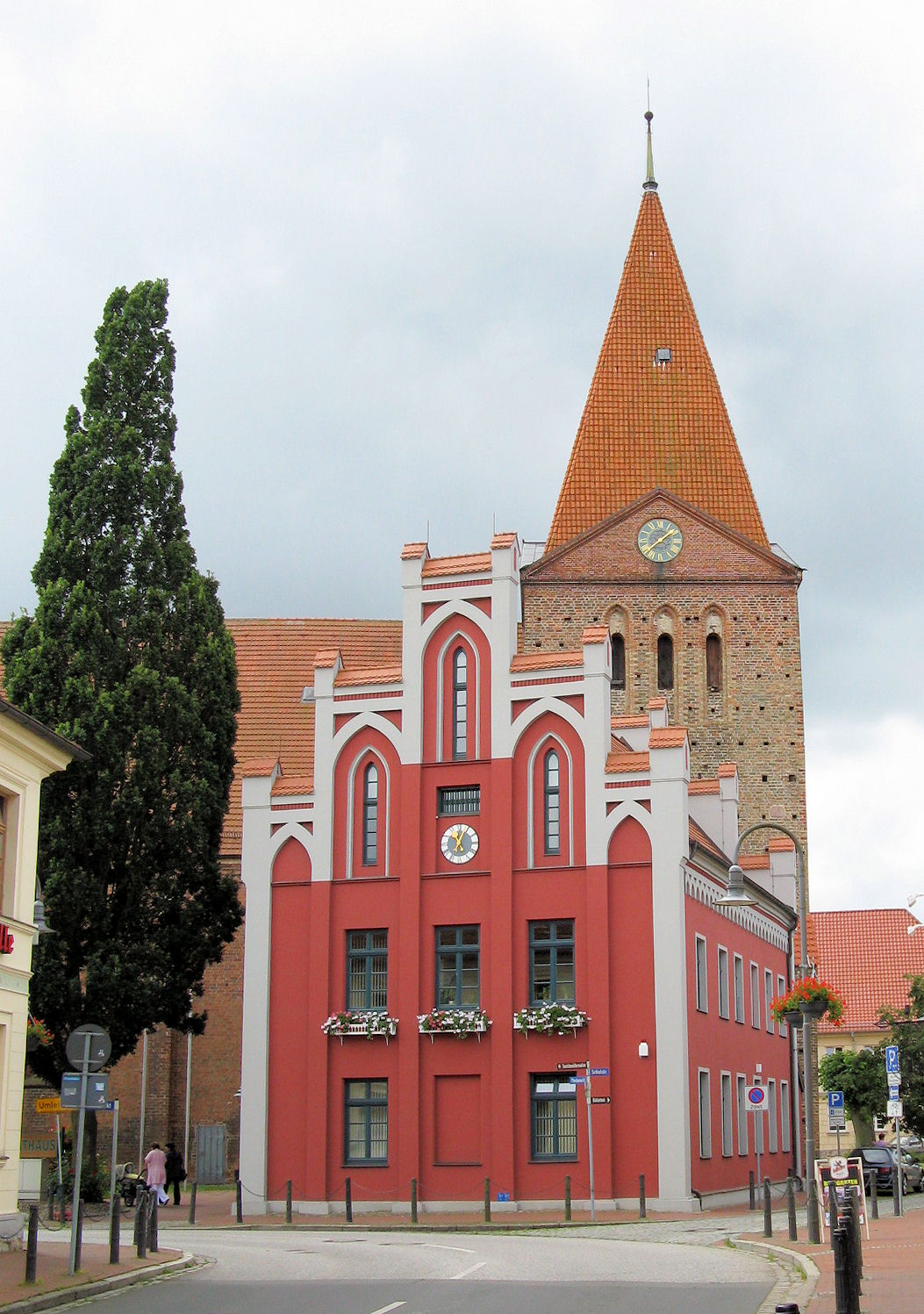
Town hall and St. Paul's of Schwaan

The area around the Warnow was originally populated by Slavic peoples, which one can still recognize in place and farm names. Schwaan was first mentioned as a town in a record from 1276.

In 1765 a great fire destroyed the entire town except for St. Paul’s Church and a mill. The town was rebuilt in the classical style, especially the townhouses which can be seen today.

In the 19th century, Schwaan was a small country town and the market for the surrounding communities of the Schwaan township. The construction of the railway line from Hamburg to Rostock through Schwaan in 1850 brought an economic boom. The city hall was built only five years later in the neo-Gothic style.

With the coming of the railroad, the town became a getaway destination for residents of the city of Rostock. In 1911 a lung sanatorium was built, which was later expanded into a tuberculosis and rehabilitation clinic. In 1928 the first river bathing resort in Germany was built on the Warnow.

During the World War II Schwaan suffered no damage from bombing, but the Warnow bridge, built in 1828, was dynamited shortly before the end of the war.

Since German reunification in October 1990, the historic center of the town has been completely rehabilitated through an urban renewal program of the German government.

== Sister cities ==
Since 1990 Schwaan has had a partnership with Loxstedt, south of Bremerhaven in Lower Saxony.

== Coat of arms ==
The emblem of a swan on a blue shield originated as a town road sign and has represented Schwaan since before 1606 when it first appeared as the town seal.

Blazon: “In Azure a dexter sweeping Argent swan with Or beak and Or feet and with Or ducally gorged.”

== Culture and attractions ==
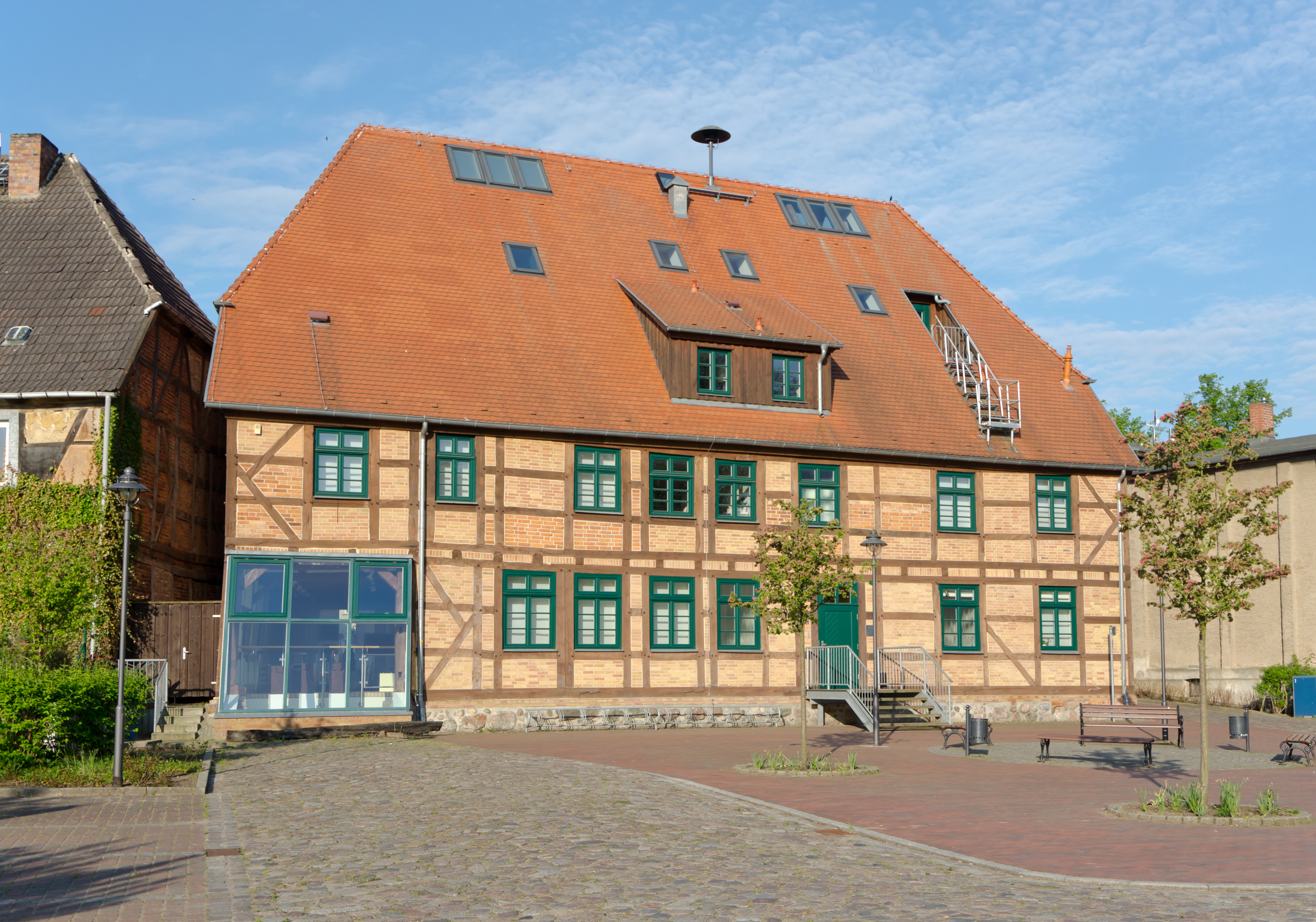
Schwaan Art Museum at the Water Mill

Art Museum at the Water Mill: the Museum of Art present works of art from Mecklenburg. A special emphasis is put on the work of the painters Franz Bunke, Rudolf Bartels, Peter Paul Draewing (all from Schwaan) and Alfred Heinsohn (of Hamburg).

In the market place is the war memorial for the victims of 1870-71, constructed in 1895. On its front is a relief medallion of Frederick Francis IV, Grand Duke of Mecklenburg-Schwerin, created by the sculptor Hermann Hultzsch. The monument is crowned by an Iron Cross.

== Transport ==
Schwaan is located on the Rostock-Güstrow and Rostock-Bützow-Schwerin railway lines. The town is well connected to the national highway network, with Bundesautobahn 19 (comparable to a freeway, expressway or interstate highway) and Bundesautobahn 20 about 15 km to the north and east. Also to the east, about 16 km, is the Rostock-Laage Airport.

== Personalities ==
- Franz Bunke (b. December 3, 1857 in Schwaan; d. July 6, 1939 in Weimar), artist and founder of the Schwaan artist colony.
- William Kruse (b. 22 October 1887 in Schwaan; d. unknown), sculptor
- Jacob Marcus (c. 1749 - 1819), German-Swedish businessman and community leader

== Literature ==
- Schwaan - “like a breath of dreamy thoughts”. Town of Schwaan. (Text: Heiko Brunner ...). Rostock: Redieck and Schade, 2005. -- 175 p.
