= John I of Mecklenburg-Stargard =

John I, Duke of Mecklenburg-Stargard
- Coats-of-arms of Mecklenburg
- Born: 1326
- Died: between 9 August 1392 and 9 February 1393
- Noble family: House of Mecklenburg
- Spouses: Rixa; Anna of Pinneberg and Schauenburg; Agnes of Lindow-Ruppin
- Father: Henry II of Mecklenburg
- Mother: Anna of Saxe-Wittenberg

John I, Duke of Mecklenburg-Stargard (1326 – between 9 August 1392 and 9 February 1393), Duke of Mecklenburg from 1344 to 1352 and Duke of Mecklenburg-Stargard from 1352 to 1392.

== Life ==
John I was probably born in 1326 as the youngest child from the second marriage of Lord Henry II "the Lion" of Mecklenburg and Anna of Saxe-Wittenberg, a daughter of Duke Albert II of Saxe-Wittenberg.

His father died in 1329, John remained under guardianship until 1344, when he came of age and began to carry a seal as a participant in the governance of Mecklenburg. On 8 July 1348, Holy Roman Emperor Charles IV raised John and his brother Albert II to the rank of Duke in Prague. John, Albert and Charles initially supported the False Waldemar in his claim against Margrave Louis V of Bavaria, but in 1350 both brothers reconciled with Louis after Emperor Charles IV withdrew his support for Waldemar.

Upon the division of Mecklenburg on 25 November 1352, John was awarded the Lordships of Stargard, Sternberg, Eldenbürg (Lübz) and Ture. He supported his nephew Albert III of Mecklenburg in his attempts to be recognized as King of Sweden.

According to historian Nikolaus Marschalk (d. 1525), John died sometime in the 1370s and was buried in the cathedral at Strelitz. However, this date is incorrect, as documentary evidence shows that John was still active into the early 1390s. The last known document bearing his signature is dated 9 August 1392. By 9 February 1393, his sons John II and Ulrich I were ruling in his stead.

== Marriages and issue ==
John married three times. His first wife Rixa (background unknown) probably died soon after the wedding and the marriage remained childless.

His second wife Anna was a daughter of the Count Adolf VII of Pinneberg and Schauenburg. She probably died in 1358. John and Anna had a daughter Anna, who married Wartislaw VI of Pomerania-Wolgast on 4 April 1363.

John's third wife Agnes was the daughter of Ulrich II of Lindow-Ruppin and widow of Lord Nicholas IV of Werle. They probably married in 1358 and had five children together:

- John II (died between 6 July and 9 October 1416), co-regent, then Duke of Mecklenburg-Stargard, from 1408 Lord of Sternberg, Friedland, Fürstenberg and Lychen
- Ulrich I (died 8 April 1417), co-regent, then Duke of Mecklenburg-Stargard (1392–1417), from 1408 Lord of Neubrandenburg, Stargard, Strelitz and Wesenberg (with Lize)
- Rudolf (died after 28 July 1415), was initially Bishop of Skara and from 1390 as Rudolf III Bishop of Schwerin
- Albert I (died 1397), co-regent of Mecklenburg, from 1396 Coadjutor of Dorpat
- Contance (born c. 1373, died 1408)

John I of Mecklenburg-Stargard House of Mecklenburg
Preceded by Henry II as Lord of Mecklenburg	Duke of Mecklenburg-Stargard; 1352–1393	Succeeded by John II and Ulrich I
