= Henry II of Mecklenburg =

Lord of Mecklenburg

Henry II the Lion
- Lord of Mecklenburg
- Mecklenburg coats of arms
- Born: after 14 April 1266
- Died: 21 January 1329; Sternberg
- Noble family: House of Mecklenburg
- Spouses: Beatrix of Brandenburg; Anna of Saxe-Wittenberg; Agnes of Lindow-Ruppin
- Issue: Matilda, Duchess of Brunswick-Lüneburg; Ludgarda, Duchess of Bytom; Albert II, Duke of Mecklenburg; John I, Duke of Mecklenburg-Stargard
- Father: Henry I, Lord of Mecklenburg
- Mother: Anastasia of Pomerania

Henry II, Lord of Mecklenburg, nicknamed the Lion (after 14 April 1266 – 21 January 1329 in Sternberg) was regent of Mecklenburg from 1287 to 1298, co-regent from 1298 to 1302 and ruled alone again from 1302 to 1329.

== Life ==
He was the son of Henry I and reigned from 1287 to 1289 together with his brother John III. During his father's absence (his father had been taken prisoner while on a crusade) from 1275 to 1302, Mecklenburg was ruled by his mother Anastasia jointly with Henry's uncles Nicholas III (until 1290) and John II (until 1283). In 1287, Henry II became co-regent with his mother and uncle. When his father died in 1302, Henry II became Lord of Mecklenburg.

Early in his reign, he conducted an unsuccessful war against Nicholas II of Werle about the succession of Henry I. Around 1299, the sons of his father-in-law Albert III of Brandenburg died and Albert gave (or sold) him the Lordship of Stargard, which Albert had earlier promised to give as dowry to his daughter Beatrix (Henry II's wife). In the 1304 Treaty of Vietmannsdorf, it was once again agreed that Brandenburg enfeoffed Henry II with the Lordship of Stargard. Nevertheless, when Beatrix died without a male heir in 1314, Brandenburg demanded that Stargard be handed back. This led to the so-called "North German Margrave War".

in 1299, an alliance of Henry II of Mecklenburg, Nicholas II of Werle and Albert III of Brandenburg-Salzwedel tried to conquer the Principality of Rostock. Lord Nicholas I of Rostock put his country in 1300 under the feudal rule and protection of King Eric VI of Denmark. Eric defeated Henry and then took Rostock for himself.

In 1304, a new alliance, consisting of Henry II and Albert's successor Herman came to the aid of king Wenceslaus II of Bohemia in his war against Emperor Albert I. In this war, Henry earned his nickname "the Lion".

In 1310, he began a war against the Hanseatic cities of Wismar and Rostock. The trigger for this war was the refusal of Wismar to host the wedding of Henry's daughter Matilda with Duke Otto III of Brunswick-Lüneburg. Henry III then chose Sternberg as his residence and held the wedding there. Wismar submitted to Henry in 1311 and he continued his attack on Rostock. On 15 December 1312, he took the city, despite fierce resistance. The city rose up again in 1313, when Henry was undertaking a pilgrimage to the Madonna del Rocca church in Castelmola. On 12 January 1314, Rostock was subdued again and the old city council, led by Bernhard Kopman, was restored to power.

In 1315, the so-called "North German Margrave War" broke out, against Brandenburg and the city of Stralsund. Brandenburg, now led by Margrave Waldemar, invaded the disputed Lordship of Stargard. Henry besieged Stargard, but had to break off his siege in July 1316. He defeated Waldemar in the Battle of Gransee and was finally awarded the Lordship of Stargard in the Treaty of Templin of 25 November 1317.

In 1319 Henry and Count Gerhard III of Holstein-Rendsburg tried to subdue Ditmarschen, but were unsuccessful. Ditmarschen won the Battle of Wöhrden, where Henry escaped with difficulty. Later that year, Waldemar died and Henry II conquered Prignitz and the Uckermark.

In 1323, Rostock revolted again, and Henry subdued the city again and made peace with King Christopher II of Denmark on 21 May 1323. Christopher enfeoffed him with the Lordships of Rostock, Gnoien and Schwaan.

The new Margrave Louis I of Brandenburg, or rather his guardian Count Berthold VII of Henneberg-Schleusingen, reconquered Prignitz and the Uckermark and Henry had to settle for an unfavourable peace treaty on 24 May 1325. After the last Prince of Rügen, Wizlaw died on 10 November 1325, the first War of the Rügen Succession broke out. It ended after fierce fighting with the Peace of Brudersdorf of 27 June 1328, in which Pomerania acquired Rügen and Mecklenburg had to settle for a monetary compensation.

Henry II died on 21 January 1329.

== Marriage and issue ==
Henry's first marriage was to Beatrix of Brandenburg (died: before 25 September 1314), the daughter of Margrave Albert III of Brandenburg. They had one daughter:

- Matilda (1293-1357), married in 1311 with Duke Otto III of Brunswick-Lüneburg

His second marriage, after 6 July 1315, was to Anna of Saxe-Wittenberg (died between 25 June 1327 and 9 August 1328), the daughter of Duke Albert II of Saxe-Wittenberg and Agnes Habsburg, daughter of Rudolph I of Germany. They had the following children:

- Ludgarda (ca.1316-1362), married Duke Władysław of Bytom
- Henry (1316-1321)
- Anastasia (1317-1321)
- Albert II (1318-1379), nicknamed The Great, who succeeded Henry as Lord of Mecklenburg, and in 1348 became the first Duke of Mecklenburg
- Agnes (1320-1340), married on 6 January 1338 with Lord Nicholas III of Werle-Güstrow
- John I (1329-1392), Lord of Mecklenburg and from 1348, Duke of Mecklenburg-Stargard
- Beatrix of Mecklenburg, (born: 1324; died: 5 August 1399), abbess of the Ribnitz Monastery (1348-1395)

His third wife was Agnes, the daughter of Count Ulrich of Lindow-Ruppin (died: after 30 July 1343). This marriage remained childless. After the death of Henry, Agnes married Rudolf I, Duke of Saxe-Wittenberg.

Henry II of Mecklenburg House of Mecklenburg Born: after 14 April 1266 Died: 21 January 1329
Preceded by Henry I	Lord of Mecklenburg; 1287-1329	Succeeded by Albert II as Duke of Mecklenburg
