= Schulzendorf =

- Municipality
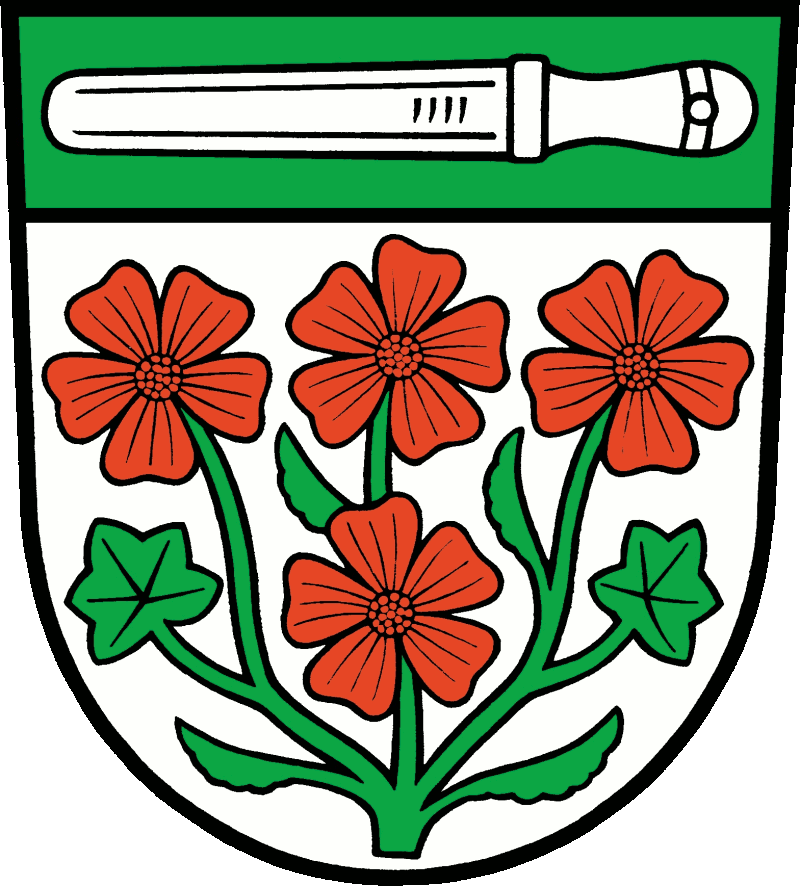
- Coat of arms

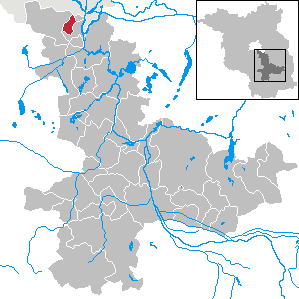
- Location of Schulzendorf within Dahme-Spreewald district
- Interactive map of Schulzendorf
- Location within Germany Location within Brandenburg
- Coordinates: 52°22′00″N 13°34′59″E
- Country: Germany
- State: Brandenburg
- District: Dahme-Spreewald
- Subdivisions: 4 Ortsteile

Government
  - Mayor (2017–25): Markus Mücke (SPD)

Area
  - Total: 9.1 km^{2} (3.5 sq mi)
- Elevation: 37 m (121 ft)

Population (2025-12-31)
  - Total: 9,716
  - Density: 1,100/km^{2} (2,800/sq mi)
- Time zone: UTC+01:00 (CET)
  - Summer (DST): UTC+02:00 (CEST)
- Postal codes: 15732
- Dialling codes: 033762
- Vehicle registration: LDS
- Website: www.schulzendorf.de

Schulzendorf (German pronunciation: [ˈʃʊltsn̩dɔʁf]) is a municipality in the district of Dahme-Spreewald in Brandenburg in Germany, located just outside the city limits of Berlin.

== Demography ==
Development of Population since 1875 within the Current Boundaries (Blue Line: Population; Dotted Line: Comparison to Population Development of Brandenburg state; Grey Background: Time of Nazi rule; Red Background: Time of Communist rule)

Recent Population Development and Projections (Population Development before Census 2011 (blue line); Recent Population Development according to the Census in Germany in 2011 (blue bordered line); Official projections for 2005-2030 (yellow line); for 2020-2030 (green line); for 2017-2030 (scarlet line)

Schulzendorf: Population development
within the current boundaries (2017)

Year	Pop.	±% p.a.
1875	253	—
1890	265	+0.31%
1910	322	+0.98%
1925	761	+5.90%
1933	4,102	+23.44%
1939	7,508	+10.60%
1946	7,738	+0.43%
1950	8,052	+1.00%
1964	7,285	−0.71%
1971	7,303	+0.04%
1981	6,573	−1.05%
1985	6,264	−1.20%
1989	5,958	−1.24%
1990	5,810	−2.48%
1991	5,703	−1.84%

Year	Pop.	±% p.a.
1992	5,771	+1.19%
1993	5,777	+0.10%
1994	5,877	+1.73%
1995	5,850	−0.46%
1996	5,824	−0.44%
1997	6,090	+4.57%
1998	6,467	+6.19%
1999	6,810	+5.30%
2000	7,004	+2.85%
2001	7,073	+0.99%
2002	7,117	+0.62%
2003	7,285	+2.36%
2004	7,409	+1.70%
2005	7,499	+1.21%
2006	7,549	+0.67%

Year	Pop.	±% p.a.
2007	7,564	+0.20%
2008	7,617	+0.70%
2009	7,662	+0.59%
2010	7,706	+0.57%
2011	7,575	−1.70%
2012	7,560	−0.20%
2013	7,633	+0.97%
2014	7,706	+0.96%
2015	7,872	+2.15%
2016	7,961	+1.13%
2017	8,167	+2.59%
2018	8,222	+0.67%
2019	8,441	+2.66%
2020	8,945	+5.97%
