= Nicholas IV of Werle =

- Born: before 1331
- Died: between 14 March and 13 November 1354
- Noble family: House of Mecklenburg
- Spouse: Agnes of Lindow-Ruppin
- Issue Detail: John IV of Werle
- Father: John III of Werle
- Mother: Matilda of Pomerania

Nicholas IV, Lord of Werle[-Goldberg], nicknamed Poogenoge ("Pig's eyes") (born: before 1331; died: between 14 March and 13 November 1354) was from 1350 to 1354 to Lord of Werle-Goldberg.

== Biography ==
He was the son of John III and Matilda of Pomerania (born: abt. 1304, died: 1331). He allegedly received his nickname from the shape and the look in his eyes.

He initially ruled the dominion Werle-Goldberg jointly with his father John III and from 1350 alone. He still signed a peace treaty on 14 March 1354, but is no longer mentioned after 13 November of that year.

He was married to Agnes (died after 1361). Presumably, she was a daughter of daughter of Ulrich II of Lindow-Ruppin. After Nicholas' death, she married John I of Mecklenburg-Stargard.

== Issue ==
Nicholas had at least three children:

- John IV succeeded him as Lord of Werle-Goldberg
- Matilda (died: before 17 December 1402) married Lorenz of Werle
- Agnes married John VI of Werle-Waren

Nicholas IV of Werle House of Mecklenburg Born: before 1331 Died: 1354
Preceded by John III	Lord of Werle-Goldberg; 1350-1354	Succeeded by John IV
