= Lordship of Stargard =

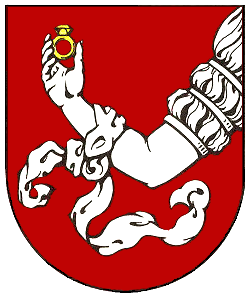
Coat of arms of the Lordship of Stargard

The Lordship of Stargard (German: Herrschaft Stargard, Stargarder Land or Land Stargard) was a county first set up in the 13th century as the terra Stargardiensis and first documented in the area of the border between Brandenburg, Pomerania and Mecklenburg.

== See also ==
- Mecklenburg-Stargard
- Battle of Gransee, fought in 1316 between Mecklenburger and Brandenburger armies over rights to the Lordship.
