= List of rulers of Mecklenburg =

Monarchy of Mecklenburg
- State
- Grand ducal coat of arms of Mecklenburg-Schwerin

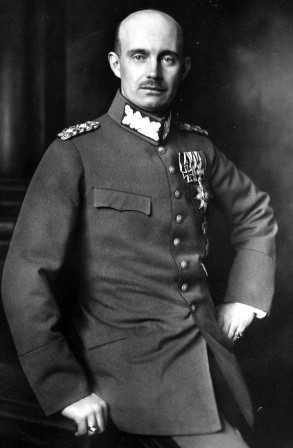
- Frederick Francis IV of Mecklenburg-Schwerin

Details
- Style: His Royal Highness
- First monarch: Niklot
- Last monarch: Frederick Francis IV, Grand Duke of Mecklenburg-Schwerin
- Formed: 1130
- Abolished: 1918
- Appointer: Hereditary
- Pretender: Borwin, Duke of Mecklenburg

This list of dukes and grand dukes of Mecklenburg dates from the origins of the German princely state of Mecklenburg's royal house in the High Middle Ages to the monarchy's abolition at the end of World War I. Strictly speaking, Mecklenburg's princely dynasty was descended linearly from the princes (or kings) of a Slavic tribe, the Obotrites, and had its original residence in a castle (Mecklenburg) in Dorf Mecklenburg (Mikelenburg) close to Wismar. As part of a feudal union under German law from 1160—at first under the Saxons—Mecklenburg was granted imperial immediacy in 1348 and its princely rulers styled Dukes of Mecklenburg. Despite several partitions, Mecklenburg remained an integral state until the end of the monarchy. The First Partition of Mecklenburg came in 1234, causing the principality to lose land. Thus arose the partial principalities (lordships) of Werle, Parchim-Richenberg, Rostock and Mecklenburg. In modern times it was divided into the two (partial) duchies of Mecklenburg-Schwerin (I) and Mecklenburg-Stargard (1348–1471), Mecklenburg-Schwerin (II) and Mecklenburg-Güstrow (1555–1695), and with the Treaty of Hamburg (1701) into Mecklenburg-Schwerin (III) and Mecklenburg-Strelitz. However, the dynasty always retained feudal rights to the entire fief and the rulers of both parts of the country always had identical titles, which led to diplomatic confusion.

The Congress of Vienna in 1815 granted the ruling dukes an adjustment in rank with the title Grand Duke of Mecklenburg and the personal style Royal Highness. Both parts of the country were henceforth designated Grand Duchies. Besides both rulers, each heir to the throne, their respective wives and all other members of the princely family used the title of Duke (or Duchess) of Mecklenburg, notwithstanding the customary name of Princes and Princesses. The rulers of Mecklenburg were styled Duke of (from 1815 Grand Duke of) Mecklenburg, Prince of the Wends, Schwerin and Ratzeburg, and Count of Schwerin, Lord of the Lands of Rostock and Stargard (Herzog zu / Großherzog von Mecklenburg, Fürst zu Wenden, Schwerin und Ratzeburg, auch Graf zu Schwerin, der Lande Rostock und Stargard Herr).

At the end of the monarchy in 1918, the House of Mecklenburg was the oldest ruling princely dynasty in Germany. During the Weimar Republic, the former princely title was turned into a commoner's surname, Herzog zu Mecklenburg ("Duke of Mecklenburg").

== The Land of the Obotrites ==
As allies of the Carolingian kings and the empire of their Ottonian successors, the Obotrites fought from 808 to 1200 against the kings of Denmark, who wished to rule the Baltic region independently of the empire. When opportunities arose, for instance upon the death of an emperor, they would seek to seize power; and in 983 Hamburg was destroyed by the Obotrites under their king, Mstivoj. At times they levied tribute from the Danes and Saxons. Under the leadership of Niklot, they resisted a Christian assault during the Wendish Crusade.

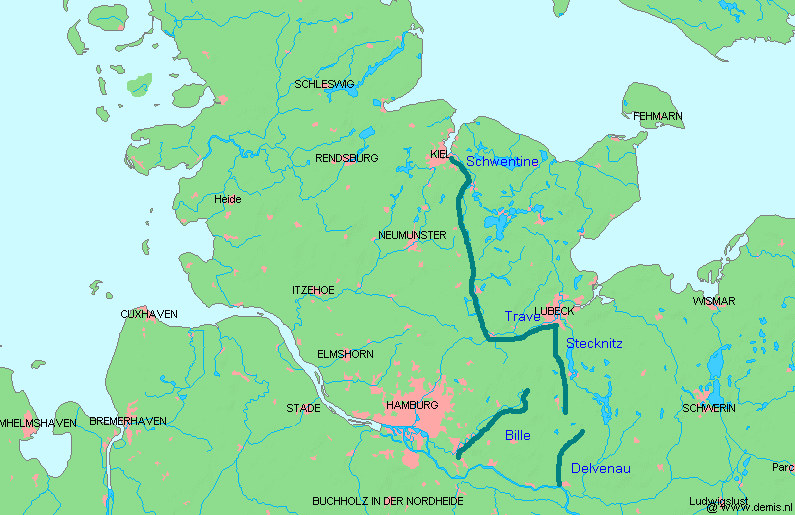
The Limes Saxoniae forming the border between the Saxons to the west and the Obotrites to the east

German missionaries such as Vicelinus converted the Obotrites to Christianity. In 1170 they acknowledged the suzerainty of the Holy Roman Empire, leading to Germanisation and assimilation over the following centuries. The ruling clan of the Obotrites kept its power throughout the Germanisation and ruled their country (except for a short interruption in Thirty Years' War) as House of Mecklenburg until the end of monarchies in Germany in November Revolution 1918.

=== List of Obotrite leaders ===
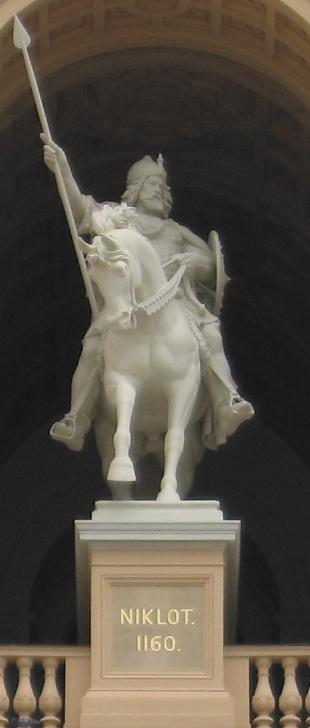
Niklot (1090 – 1160) chief of the Obotrite confederacy

Ruler	Reign	Notes
Witzlaus	?–ca. 795	
Thrasco	?–ca. 795-810	
Slavomir (de)	?–810-819	Ally of the Frankish Empire. In 816, he joined the rebellion of the Sorbs. Eventually captured and abandoned by his own people, being replaced by Ceadrag in 818.
Ceadrag (de)	819 - after 826	Ally of the Frankish Empire. He rebelled against the Franks with alliance with the Danes, but later was reconciled with Franks.
Selibur
Nako	954-966	Nako and his brother Stoigniew were defeated at the Raxa river (955) by Otto I, after which Stoigniew was beheaded and Nako accepted Christianity, resulting in thirty years of peace.
Mstivoj and Mstidrag	966 - 995	Sons of Nako. They abandoned Christianity and revolted against the Germans (Great Slav Rising).
Mieceslas III	919 - 999	in 995 defeated by Otto III, Holy Roman Emperor.
Mstislav	996 - 1018	
Udo or Przybigniew	1018 - 1028	
Ratibor	1028 - 1043	
Gottschalk	1043 to 1066	Founder of the Wendian State
Budivoj	1066 and 1069	
Kruto	1066-1069 and 1069-1093	
Henry	1093 - 1127	

The rulers of Obotrite lands were later the Dukes and Grand Dukes of Mecklenburg.

== The Saxon suzerainty and the land of Mecklenburg ==
From the 7th through the 12th centuries, the area of Mecklenburg was taken over by Western Slavic peoples, most notably the Obotrites and other tribes that Frankish sources referred to as "Wends". The 11th century founder of the Mecklenburgian dynasty of Dukes and later Grand Dukes, which lasted until 1918, was Nyklot of the Obotrites.

In the late 12th century, Henry the Lion, Duke of the Saxons, conquered the region, subjugated its local lords, and Christianized its people, in a precursor to the Northern Crusades. From 12th to 14th century, large numbers of Germans and Flemings settled the area (Ostsiedlung), importing German law and improved agricultural techniques. The Wends who survived all warfare and devastation of the centuries before, including invasions of and expeditions into Saxony, Denmark and Liutizic areas as well as internal conflicts, were assimilated in the centuries thereafter. However, elements of certain names and words used in Mecklenburg speak to the lingering Slavic influence. An example would be the city of Schwerin, which was originally called Zuarin in Slavic. Another example is the town of Bresegard, the 'gard' portion of the town name deriving from the Slavic word 'grad', meaning city or town.

=== Partitions of Mecklenburg ===
Like many German territories, Mecklenburg was sometimes partitioned and re-partitioned among different members of the ruling dynasty. The division started in 1227.

==== Partition of 1227 ====
In 1227, Henry Borwin II divided his lands of Mecklenburg among his sons: John received the area called Mecklenburg; Nicholas received Werle; Henry Borwin III Rostock and Pribislaus Parchim-Rinchenberg. In 1256, the latter showed incapacity for government and his brothers deposed him, dividing his lands among themselves.

In 1314 the land of Nicholas the Child of Rostock died without heirs; his lands were annexed to Mecklenburg-Mecklenburg.

In 1348 Mecklenburg-Mecklenburg and its possessions were elevated as an unified duchy, with seat at Schwerin. The line of Mecklenburg-Mecklenburg then took the seat's name for their branch: from 1348, when elevated, the line of Mecklenburg-Mecklenburg changed to Mecklenburg-Schwerin.

In 1352 the duchy of Mecklenburg-Schwerin was again divided: from Schwerin grew a new line of dukes, called Mecklenburg-Stargard.

In 1436 the Werle line, and in 1471 the Stargard line were annexed to Mecklenburg-Schwerin, reuniting all the lands of Mecklenburg.

==== Partition of 1520 ====
In 1520 the united Mecklenburg, bearing the name Mecklenburg-Schwerin, was redivided. The line of Mecklenburg-Güstrow splits off from the elder line of Mecklenburg-Schwerin. In 1695 Mecklenburg-Schwerin-Güstrow was reabsorbed in Mecklenburg, reuniting the duchy one more time.

==== Partition of 1701 ====
In 1701 the united Mecklenburg, bearing the name Mecklenburg-Schwerin, was redivided. The line of Mecklenburg-Strelitz splits off from the elder line of Mecklenburg-Schwerin. In 1918, at the end of World War I, the monarchy was abolished, with the duchy still divided.

=== Rulers of Mecklenburg: the Nikloting dynasty ===
==== Partitions of Mecklenburg under Mecklenburg rule ====
Lordship of Rostock (1st creation) (1160-1200)	Lordship of Mecklenburg (1131-1347)
Lordship of Rostock (2nd creation) (1227-1314)	Lordship of Werle (1227-1281)	Lordship of Parchim (1227-1270)
Lordship of Güstrow (1st creation) (1281-1291)	Lordship of Parchim (1281-1291)
Lordship of Werle (Parchim line) (1291-1316)
Raised to: Duchy of Mecklenburg (1347-1520)
Lordship of Goldberg (1316-1402)
Lordship of Waren (1337-1425)	Lordship of Güstrow (2nd creation) (1316-1425)
Duchy of Stargard (1352-1471)
Lordship of Werle (Gustrow line) (1425-1436)
Duchy of Schwerin (1520-1918)	Duchy of Güstrow (1520-1695)
Duchy of Strelitz (1695-1918)

==== Table of rulers ====
(Note: The current numbering system established for the rulers of Mecklenburg is based in the following: the Mecklenburgian group (Mecklenburg, and then Schwerin, later Gustrow and Strelitz) form one group of a single numbering. The other parts of Mecklenburg (Parchim, Werle and divisions, Rostock and Stargard) have their own and independent numberings for their rulers.)

Ruler	Born	Reign	Ruling part	Consort	Death	Notes
Niklot	1090 ?	1131 – August 1160	Principality of the Obotritic Confederation	Unknown at least two children	August 1160; Werle aged 69-70	Founder of the Nikloting family, he was a Prince of the Obotrites. Also ruled the subdued Polabian Slav tribes of Kessinians and Circipanians.
Pribislaus I Henry	c.1130? First son of Niklot	August 1160 – 30 December 1178	Lordship of Mecklenburg	Vizlava of Pomerania c.1175 at least one child	30 December 1178; Lüneburg aged 47-48?	Children of Niklot, divided their inheritance. Pribislaus accepted Saxon suzerainty in 1167.
Warcislaus	c.1130? Second son of Niklot	August 1160 – June 1164	Lordship of Rostock	Unknown at least one child	June 1164; Trostberg aged 33-34?	Children of Niklot, divided their inheritance. Pribislaus accepted Saxon suzerainty in 1167.
Prislaus	c.1130? Third son of Niklot	August 1160 – c.1175	Lordship of Lolland (vassalage to Denmark)	Catharina of Denmark; 1159 two children	c.1175 aged 44-45?	Children of Niklot, divided their inheritance. Pribislaus accepted Saxon suzerainty in 1167.
Regency of Pribislaus I, Lord of Mecklenburg (1164-1178)						Left no descendants. Rostock was inherited by Mecklenburg.
Nicholas I (alternatively Niklot II)	c.1160 Son of Warcislaus	June 1164 – 25 May 1200	Lordship of Rostock	Unmarried	25 May 1200; Wittendörp aged 39-40	Left no descendants. Rostock was inherited by Mecklenburg.
Rostock annexed to Mecklenburg
Canute	c.1160? Son of Prislaus and Catharina of Denmark	c.1175 – 1183	Lordship of Lolland (vassalage to Denmark)	Unmarried	1183 aged 22-23?	Left no descendants. After his death, Lolland returned to Denmark's possession
Lolland annexed to Denmark
Henry Borwin I	c.1150 Son of Pribislaus I Henry and Vizlava of Pomerania	30 December 1178 – 1219	Lordship of Mecklenburg	Matilda of Saxony c.1170 two children Adelaide before 1227 one child	28 January 1227 aged 76-77	Abdicated in 1219.
Henry Borwin II	1170; First son of Henry Borwin I and Matilda of Saxony	1219 – 5 June 1226	Lordship of Mecklenburg (at Mecklenburg proper)	Christina of Sweden c.1200 six children	5 June 1226; Güstrow aged 55-56	Children of Henry Borwin I, ruled jointly.
Nicholas II	c.1175 Second son of Henry Borwin I and Matilda of Saxony	1219 – 28 September 1225	Lordship of Mecklenburg (at Gadebusch)	Unmarried	28 September 1225; Gadebusch aged 49-50	Children of Henry Borwin I, ruled jointly.
Gadebusch annexed to Mecklenburg
Nicholas I	c.1210 First son of Henry Borwin II and Christina of Sweden	5 June 1226 – 14 May 1277	Lordship of Werle	Judith of Anhalt; 1231 seven children	14 May 1277 aged 66-67	Children of Henry Borwin II, divided their inheritance. Despite being stripped off from Parchim by his brothers, he still retained his rule at the town of Białogard, which he passed to his son. In Rostock, and from 1262, Henry Borwin III associated his eldest son to his rule, but he predeceased him.
John I the Theologian	c.1211 Second son of Henry Borwin II and Christina of Sweden	5 June 1226 – 1 August 1264	Lordship of Mecklenburg	Luitgard of Henneberg c.1230 seven children	1 August 1264 aged 52-53	Children of Henry Borwin II, divided their inheritance. Despite being stripped off from Parchim by his brothers, he still retained his rule at the town of Białogard, which he passed to his son. In Rostock, and from 1262, Henry Borwin III associated his eldest son to his rule, but he predeceased him.
Henry Borwin III	c.1220 Third son of Henry Borwin II and Christina of Sweden	5 June 1226 – 1 August 1278	Lordship of Rostock	Sophia of Sweden; 1237 four children	1 August 1278 aged 57-58	Children of Henry Borwin II, divided their inheritance. Despite being stripped off from Parchim by his brothers, he still retained his rule at the town of Białogard, which he passed to his son. In Rostock, and from 1262, Henry Borwin III associated his eldest son to his rule, but he predeceased him.
John	c.1240? First son of Henry Borwin III and Sophia of Sweden	1262 – 1266	Lordship of Rostock	Unmarried	1266 aged 25-26	Children of Henry Borwin II, divided their inheritance. Despite being stripped off from Parchim by his brothers, he still retained his rule at the town of Białogard, which he passed to his son. In Rostock, and from 1262, Henry Borwin III associated his eldest son to his rule, but he predeceased him.
Pribislaus I	1224; Fourth son of Henry Borwin II and Christina of Sweden	5 June 1226 – 1275	Lordship of Parchim-Richenberg (since 1256 in Białogard only)	A lady of the Riesack family two children A daughter of Barnim I, Duke of Pomerania one child	c.1275 Białogard aged 50-51	Children of Henry Borwin II, divided their inheritance. Despite being stripped off from Parchim by his brothers, he still retained his rule at the town of Białogard, which he passed to his son. In Rostock, and from 1262, Henry Borwin III associated his eldest son to his rule, but he predeceased him.
Parchim-Richenberg (with exceptions) was divided between the Mecklenburg parts
Henry I the Pilgrim	c.1230 First son of John I and Luitgard of Henneberg	1 August 1264 – 1271 (Ruled probably only de jure in 1298-1302)	Lordship of Mecklenburg (at Mecklenburg proper)	Anastasia of Pomerania c.1259 three children	2 January 1302 aged 71-72?	Children of John I, divided their inheritance. In 1271, Henry I made a pilgrimage to the Holy Land. On the way, he was taken prisoner and deported to Cairo, where he was held in captivity by the Arabs for 27 years. During his absence, Mecklenburg itself was subject of internal strife: his brother John II, who had received Gadesbusch, and Nicholas III himself fought for control of the young heirs, then ruling under regency of their mother at Wismar. Henry I would return to Mecklenburg via Morea and Rome in 1298. In 1299, despite formally resuming his reign, he probably left the business of government mostly to his son Henry II.
Albert I	c.1230 Second son of John I and Luitgard of Henneberg	1 August 1264 – 17 May 1265	Lordship of Mecklenburg (at Mecklenburg proper)	Unmarried	17 May 1265 aged 34-35?	
Nicholas III	c.1230 Third son of John I and Luitgard of Henneberg	1 August 1264 – 8 June 1290	Lordship of Mecklenburg (at Mecklenburg proper)	Unmarried	8 June 1290 aged 59-60?	
John II	c.1240 Fourth son of John I and Luitgard of Henneberg	1 August 1264 – 12 October 1299	Lordship of Mecklenburg (at Gadebusch)	Luitgard of Arnsberg-Cuik (d.1304) three children	12 October 1299 aged 58-59?	
Gadebusch reannexed to Mecklenburg
Anastasia of Pomerania	c.1245 Daughter of Barnim I, Duke of Pomerania and Anna Maria of Saxony	1271 – 15 March 1317	Lordship of Mecklenburg (at Poel)	Henry I c.1259 three children	15 March 1317; Ribnitz-Damgarten aged 71-72	Possibly controlling Wismar from her dowry island of Poel, Anastasia and her sons stood against Henry I's brothers; little by little, Henry II (the one who survived his uncles) recovered Mecklenburg. In 1298, after his father's return, he continued to manage the affairs of the duchy as the de facto ruler.
Regency of Anastasia of Pomerania (1271-1287), jointly/rivalling with Nicholas III, Lord of Mecklenburg and John II, Lord of Gadesbusch (1275-1283)						Possibly controlling Wismar from her dowry island of Poel, Anastasia and her sons stood against Henry I's brothers; little by little, Henry II (the one who survived his uncles) recovered Mecklenburg. In 1298, after his father's return, he continued to manage the affairs of the duchy as the de facto ruler.
Henry II the Lion	1267; First son of Henry I and Anastasia of Pomerania	1271 – 21 January 1329 (with his father as de jure duke 1299-1302)	Lordship of Mecklenburg (at Wismar until 1299; in Mecklenburg proper from 1299)	Beatrice of Brandenburg-Stendal c.1290 one child Anna of Saxe-Wittenberg after 6 July 1315 seven children Agnes of Lindow-Ruppin (I); After 1324 no children	21 January 1329; Sternberg aged 61-62	Possibly controlling Wismar from her dowry island of Poel, Anastasia and her sons stood against Henry I's brothers; little by little, Henry II (the one who survived his uncles) recovered Mecklenburg. In 1298, after his father's return, he continued to manage the affairs of the duchy as the de facto ruler.
John III	c.1270 Second son of Henry I and Anastasia of Pomerania	1271 – 27 May 1289	Lordship of Mecklenburg (at Wismar until 1299; in Mecklenburg proper from 1299)	Helena of Rügen; 3 November 1288 one child	27 May 1289; Poel aged 18-19	Possibly controlling Wismar from her dowry island of Poel, Anastasia and her sons stood against Henry I's brothers; little by little, Henry II (the one who survived his uncles) recovered Mecklenburg. In 1298, after his father's return, he continued to manage the affairs of the duchy as the de facto ruler.
Pribislaus II	c.1250 Son of Pribislaus I	1275 – 1288	Lordship of Parchim-Richenberg (at Białogard only)	Catherine of Pomerelia; 1269 two children	1316 aged 65-66	In 1288, he was deposed by the Duke of Pomerania, who took the fief for himself.
Białogard annexed to Pomerania
Bernard I	c.1235 First son of Nicholas I and Judith of Anhalt	14 May 1277 – 1286	Lordship of Werle (at Prisannewitz)	Unmarried	c.1286 aged 50-51?	Children of Nicholas I, ruled jointly until 1281, when they divided their inheritance. Henry I was assassinated by his own sons, an act that, according to the law of the family, disinherited them from the main portion of his father.
Henry I	c.1240 Second son of Nicholas I and Judith of Anhalt	14 May 1277 – 8 October 1291	Lordship of Güstrow	Richeza of Sweden; 1262 three children Matilda of Brunswick-Lüneburg (I); 1291 no children	8 October 1291; Saal aged 50-51?	Children of Nicholas I, ruled jointly until 1281, when they divided their inheritance. Henry I was assassinated by his own sons, an act that, according to the law of the family, disinherited them from the main portion of his father.
John I	c.1245 Third son of Nicholas I and Judith of Anhalt	14 May 1277 – 15 October 1283	Lordship of Parchim	Sophia of Lindow-Ruppin before 1275 six children	15 October 1283 aged 37-38?	Children of Nicholas I, ruled jointly until 1281, when they divided their inheritance. Henry I was assassinated by his own sons, an act that, according to the law of the family, disinherited them from the main portion of his father.
Werle and Prisannewitz divided between Parchim and Gustrow; Gustrow (with exceptions) annexed to Parchim
Valdemar	c.1240 Son of Henry Borwin III and Sophia of Sweden	1 August 1278 – 9 November 1282	Lordship of Rostock	Agnes of Holstein-Kiel before 1262 three children	9 November 1282 aged 41-42	
Regency of Agnes of Holstein-Kiel (1282-1284)						Children of Valdemar, ruled jointly. From 1285 Nicholas was already ruling alone. He died without male heirs. His inheritance went to Henry II of Mecklenburg.
Henry Borwin IV	c.1260 First son of Valdemar and Agnes of Holstein-Kiel	9 November 1282 – c.1285	Lordship of Rostock	Unmarried	c.1285 aged 24-25?	Children of Valdemar, ruled jointly. From 1285 Nicholas was already ruling alone. He died without male heirs. His inheritance went to Henry II of Mecklenburg.
John	c.1260 Second son of Valdemar and Agnes of Holstein-Kiel	9 November 1282 – c.1285	Lordship of Rostock	Unmarried	c.1285 aged 24-25?	Children of Valdemar, ruled jointly. From 1285 Nicholas was already ruling alone. He died without male heirs. His inheritance went to Henry II of Mecklenburg.
Nicholas the Child	1272; Third son of Valdemar and Agnes of Holstein-Kiel	9 November 1282 – 25 November 1314	Lordship of Rostock	Margaret of Pomerania-Wolgast; 1299 one child	25 November 1314 aged 41-42	Children of Valdemar, ruled jointly. From 1285 Nicholas was already ruling alone. He died without male heirs. His inheritance went to Henry II of Mecklenburg.
Rostock was definitely annexed to Mecklenburg
Regency of Helena of Rügen and/or Anastasia of Pomerania and/or Henry II, Lord of Mecklenburg (1289-1302)						Daughter of John III, she is referred in sources as owning, not only Dorser, but also Poel, like her grandmother; she possibly co-ruled with her at the island. In 1318, her uncle, Henry II, sold her inheritance to the Bailiwick of Bukow.
Luitgard	c.1289 Daughter of John III and Helena of Rügen	27 May 1289 – 22 November 1318	Lordship of Mecklenburg (at Dorser; in Poel since 1317, or before)	Gerhard II, Count of Hoya; 1302 no children Adolph (VII), Count of Holstein-Segeberg; 1315 no children Gunther II, Count of Lindow-Ruppin; 1318 no children	1352 aged 62-63	Daughter of John III, she is referred in sources as owning, not only Dorser, but also Poel, like her grandmother; she possibly co-ruled with her at the island. In 1318, her uncle, Henry II, sold her inheritance to the Bailiwick of Bukow.
Poel and Dorser sold to the Bailiwick of Buków
Henry II	c.1270 First son of Henry I and Richeza of Sweden	8 October 1291 – 1307	Lordship of Güstrow (at Penzlin)	Beatrice of Pomerania before 1290 two children	1307 aged 36-37	Disinherited after murdering their father, they received a small lordship in Penzlin. After Henry's death with no descendants, Penzlin was annexed to Parchim.
Nicholas	c.1270 Second son of Henry I and Richeza of Sweden	8 October 1291 – 1298	Lordship of Güstrow (at Penzlin)	Unmarried	1298 aged 27-28	Disinherited after murdering their father, they received a small lordship in Penzlin. After Henry's death with no descendants, Penzlin was annexed to Parchim.
Penzlin was definitely annexed to Parchim
Nicholas II	c.1270 First son of John I and Sophia of Lindow-Ruppin	15 October 1283 – 8 October 1291	Lordship of Parchim	Richeza of Denmark; 1292 two children Matilda of Brunswick-Lüneburg (II) after 1308 no children	18 February 1316 near Güstrow aged 45-46	In 1291 reunited most of Werle.
Nicholas II	c.1270 First son of John I and Sophia of Lindow-Ruppin	8 October 1291 – 18 February 1316	Lordship of Werle	Richeza of Denmark; 1292 two children Matilda of Brunswick-Lüneburg (II) after 1308 no children	18 February 1316 near Güstrow aged 45-46	In 1291 reunited most of Werle.
John II the Bald	c.1270 Second son of John I and Sophia of Lindow-Ruppin	18 February 1316 – 27 August 1337	Lordship of Güstrow	Matilda of Brunswick-Grubenhagen; 1311 four children	27 August 1337	Brother and son of Nicholas II, respectively, divided their inheritance.
John III Ruoden	c.1290 Son of Nicholas II and Richeza of Denmark	18 February 1316 – 1352 (only de jure from 1350)	Lordship of Goldberg	Metteke of Pomerania; 20 January 1317 three children Richardis before 1350 two children	1352 aged 61-62	Brother and son of Nicholas II, respectively, divided their inheritance.
Agnes of Lindow-Ruppin (I)	c.1290 Daughter of Ulrich I, Count of Lindow-Ruppin and Adelaide of Schladen	21 January 1329 – 9 May 1343	Lordship of Mecklenburg (at Sternberg)	Vitslav III, Prince of Rügen; 1310 three children Henry II, Lord of Mecklenburg; After 1324 no children Rudolf I, Duke of Saxe-Wittenberg; 1333 three children	9 May 1343; Wittenberg aged 52-53	Children of Henry II, divided their inheritance. Henry's widow, Agnes, received the seat at Sternberg, where her husband was residing. In 1347, Mecklenburg and Stargard were elevated to Duchies.
Council of Regency (1329-1336)						Children of Henry II, divided their inheritance. Henry's widow, Agnes, received the seat at Sternberg, where her husband was residing. In 1347, Mecklenburg and Stargard were elevated to Duchies.
Albert II the Great	c.1318 Schwerin; First son of Henry II and Anna of Saxe-Wittenberg	21 January 1329 – 18 February 1379	Lordship of Mecklenburg (until 1347) Duchy of Mecklenburg (from 1347)	Euphemia of Sweden; 10 April 1336 five children Adelheid of Hohenstein after 1370 no children	18 February 1379; Schwerin aged 60-61	Children of Henry II, divided their inheritance. Henry's widow, Agnes, received the seat at Sternberg, where her husband was residing. In 1347, Mecklenburg and Stargard were elevated to Duchies.
John I	c.1326 Schwerin; Second son of Henry II and Anna of Saxe-Wittenberg	21 January 1329 – 9 February 1393	Lordship of Stargard (until 1347) Duchy of Stargard (from 1347)	Rixa no children Anna of Holstein-Pinneberg before 1358 one child Agnes of Lindow-Ruppin (II); 1358 five children	9 February 1393; Stargard aged 66-67	Children of Henry II, divided their inheritance. Henry's widow, Agnes, received the seat at Sternberg, where her husband was residing. In 1347, Mecklenburg and Stargard were elevated to Duchies.
Sternberg was annexed to Stargard
Nicholas III the Stammerer	c.1315 First son of John II and Matilda of Brunswick-Grubenhagen	27 August 1337 – 1361	Lordship of Güstrow	Agnes of Mecklenburg; 6 January 1338 two children Matilda of Holstein-Plön after 1341 one child	1361 aged 45-46?	Children of John II, divided their inheritance.
Bernard II	c.1320 Second son of John II and Matilda of Brunswick-Grubenhagen	27 August 1337 – 1382	Lordship of Waren	Elisabeth of Holstein-Plön; 1341 three children	1382 aged 61-62?	Children of John II, divided their inheritance.
Nicholas IV the Pig-Eyed	c.1320 Son of John III and Metteke of Pomerania	1352 – 1354 (ruling de facto as regent since 1350)	Lordship of Goldberg	Agnes of Lindow-Ruppin (II); 6 January 1346 three children	1354 aged 33-34?	
Regency of Albert II, Duke of Mecklenburg and Nicholas III, Lord of Werle-Gustrow (1354-1360)						Left no descendants. The lordship was inherited by his sister.
John IV	1346? Son of Nicholas IV and Agnes of Lindow-Ruppin (II)	1354 – 1374	Lordship of Goldberg	Unmarried	1374 aged 27-28	Left no descendants. The lordship was inherited by his sister.
Lorenz	c.1340 First son of Nicholas III and Agnes of Mecklenburg	1361 – 1394	Lordship of Güstrow	Matilda, Lady of Goldberg c.1375 three children	1394 aged 53-54	Children of Nicholas III, ruled jointly. Lorenz ruled, from 1374, half of Goldberg with his wife, as it was her inheritance.
John V	c.1350? Second son of Nicholas III and Agnes of Mecklenburg	1361 – 1378	Lordship of Güstrow	Euphemia of Mecklenburg c.1375 no children	1378 aged 27-28?	Children of Nicholas III, ruled jointly. Lorenz ruled, from 1374, half of Goldberg with his wife, as it was her inheritance.
Matilda	c.1350? First daughter of Nicholas IV and Agnes of Lindow-Ruppin (II)	1374 – 1402	Lordship of Goldberg	Lorenz, Lord of Güstrow c.1375 three children	1402 aged 51-52?	Heiresses of their brother, their inheritances and marriages divided Goldberg between the Waren and Güstrow lines Both were dead by the end of 1402.
Agnes	c.1350? Second daughter of Nicholas IV and Agnes of Lindow-Ruppin (II)	1374 – 1402	Lordship of Goldberg	John VI, Lord of Waren c.1375 four children	1402 aged 51-52?	Heiresses of their brother, their inheritances and marriages divided Goldberg between the Waren and Güstrow lines Both were dead by the end of 1402.
Goldberg was divided between Waren and Güstrow
Henry III the Suspensor	1337; Mecklenburg; First son of Albert II and Euphemia of Sweden	18 February 1379 – 24 April 1383	Duchy of Mecklenburg (part 1)	Ingeborg of Denmark; 1362 four children Matilda of Werle-Waren; 26 February 1377 no children	24 April 1383; Schwerin aged 45-46	Children of Albert II, co-ruled jointly, but possibly in different parts of Mecklenburg. Albert III associated his eldest son Eric to his own part of Mecklenburg. Albert III's swedish ascendance allowed him to succeed as King of Sweden between 1364 and 1389.
Albert III	1338; Mecklenburg; Second son of Albert II and Euphemia of Sweden	18 February 1379 – 1 April 1412	Duchy of Mecklenburg (part 2)	Richardis of Schwerin; 1365 two children Agnes of Brunswick-Lüneburg; 12/13 February 1396; Schwerin one child	1 April 1412; Doberan Abbey aged 73-74	Children of Albert II, co-ruled jointly, but possibly in different parts of Mecklenburg. Albert III associated his eldest son Eric to his own part of Mecklenburg. Albert III's swedish ascendance allowed him to succeed as King of Sweden between 1364 and 1389.
Eric I	c.1360 Son of Albert III and Richardis of Schwerin	1396 – 16 July 1397	Duchy of Mecklenburg (part 2)	Sophie of Pomerania-Wolgast; 12/13 February 1396; Schwerin no children	16 July 1397; Klintehamn aged 36-37	Children of Albert II, co-ruled jointly, but possibly in different parts of Mecklenburg. Albert III associated his eldest son Eric to his own part of Mecklenburg. Albert III's swedish ascendance allowed him to succeed as King of Sweden between 1364 and 1389.
Magnus I	c.1345 Mecklenburg; Third son of Albert II and Euphemia of Sweden	18 February 1379 – 1 September 1384	Duchy of Mecklenburg (part 3)	Elsaba of Pomerania-Wolgast after 1362 two children	1 September 1384 aged 38-39	Children of Albert II, co-ruled jointly, but possibly in different parts of Mecklenburg. Albert III associated his eldest son Eric to his own part of Mecklenburg. Albert III's swedish ascendance allowed him to succeed as King of Sweden between 1364 and 1389.
John VI	c.1345 Son of Bernard II and Elisabeth of Holstein-Plön	1382 – 1395	Lordship of Waren	Agnes, Lady of Goldberg c.1375 four children	c.1395 aged 49-50	Ruled with his wife in half of Goldberg (her inheritance) since 1374.
Albert IV	c.1360 Son of Henry III and Ingeborg of Denmark	24 April 1383 – December 1388	Duchy of Mecklenburg (part 1)	Elisabeth of Holstein-Rendsburg before 1388 no children	December 1388 aged 27-28	Claimed the Danish throne after the death of Valdemar IV of Denmark. Left no children. His part of the co-rulership was probably divided between the other two.
Part 1 of Mecklenburg divided between Parts 2 and 3
Regencies of John I, Duke of Stargard (1384-1393) and John II, Duke of Stargard (1393-1395)						
John IV	c.1370 Son of Magnus I and Elsaba of Pomerania-Wolgast	1 September 1384 – 16 October 1422	Duchy of Mecklenburg (part 3)	Jutta von Hoya before 1415 no children Catherine of Saxe-Lauenburg; 1416 two children	16 October 1422; Schwerin aged 51-52	
John II	c.1360 First son of John I and Agnes of Lindow-Ruppin (II)	9 February 1393 – 9 October 1416	Duchy of Stargard (at Sternberg)	Wilheida Catharina of Lithuania; 1388 three children	9 October 1416; Sternberg aged 55-56	Sons of John I, divided their inheritance.
Ulrich I	c.1360 Second son of John I and Agnes of Lindow-Ruppin (II)	9 February 1393 – 8 April 1417	Duchy of Stargard (at Stargard proper)	Margaret of Pomerania-Stettin before 1400 three children	8 April 1417; Neustrelitz aged 56-57	Sons of John I, divided their inheritance.
Albert I	c.1360 Third son of John I and Agnes of Lindow-Ruppin (II)	9 February 1393 – 1397	Duchy of Stargard (at Stargard proper)	Unmarried	1397; Dorpat aged 36-37	Sons of John I, divided their inheritance.
Nicholas V	c.1375 First son of John VI and Agnes of Werle-Goldberg	1395 – 1408	Lordship of Waren	Sophie of Pomerania-Wolgast after 1397 one child	1408 aged 32-33	Sons of John VI, ruled jointly. After Christopher's death, Waren went to Gustrow.
Christopher	c.1380 Second son of John VI and Agnes of Werle-Goldberg	1395 – 25 August 1425	Lordship of Waren	Unmarried	25 August 1425; Pritzwalk aged 44-45	Sons of John VI, ruled jointly. After Christopher's death, Waren went to Gustrow.
Waren was definitely annexed to Güstrow
Balthasar	c.1375 First son of Lorenz and Matilda of Werle-Goldberg	1394 – 5 April 1421	Lordship of Güstrow	Euphemia of Mecklenburg; 18 October 1397 no children Helvig of Holstein-Rendsburg; 18 April 1417 no children	5 April 1421 aged 45-46?	Children of Lorenz, ruled jointly. William reunited Werle, but left no descendants. Werle went to Mecklenburg.
John VII	c.1375 Second son of Lorenz and Matilda of Werle-Goldberg	1394 – 1414	Lordship of Güstrow	Catherine of Saxe-Lauenburg before 1414 no children	1414 aged 38-39?	Children of Lorenz, ruled jointly. William reunited Werle, but left no descendants. Werle went to Mecklenburg.
William	c.1375 Third son of Lorenz and Matilda of Werle-Goldberg	1394 – 25 August 1425	Lordship of Güstrow	Anna of Anhalt; 1422 no children Sophia of Pomerania-Barth after 1426 one child	8 September 1436 near Güstrow aged 60-61?	Children of Lorenz, ruled jointly. William reunited Werle, but left no descendants. Werle went to Mecklenburg.
William	c.1375 Third son of Lorenz and Matilda of Werle-Goldberg	25 August 1425 – 8 September 1436	Lordship of Werle	Anna of Anhalt; 1422 no children Sophia of Pomerania-Barth after 1426 one child	8 September 1436 near Güstrow aged 60-61?	Children of Lorenz, ruled jointly. William reunited Werle, but left no descendants. Werle went to Mecklenburg.
Werle (with exceptions) was definitely annexed to Mecklenburg
Regency of Agnes of Brunswick-Lüneburg (1412-1415)						
Albert V	1397; Son of Albert III and Agnes of Brunswick-Lüneburg	1 April 1412 – 16 October 1423	Duchy of Mecklenburg (part 2)	Margaret of Brandenburg; 1423 no children	16 October 1423 aged 25-26	
Part 3 of Mecklenburg annexed to Part 2
John III	1389; Son of John II and Wilheida Catharina of Lithuania	9 October 1416 – 1438	Duchy of Stargard (at Sternberg)	Luttrud of Anhalt-Köthen before 1438 no children	1438 aged 48-49	After his death with no descendants, Sternberg returned to Stargard property.
Sternberg annexed to Stargard
Albert II	c.1400 Stargard; First son of Ulrich I and Margaret of Pomerania-Stettin	8 April 1417 – 4 October 1423	Duchy of Stargard (at Stargard proper)	Unmarried	4 October 1423; Stargard aged 21-22	Children of Ulrich I, ruled jointly.
Henry the Elder	c.1405 Schwerin; Second son of Ulrich I and Margaret of Pomerania-Stettin	8 April 1417 – 1466	Duchy of Stargard (at Stargard proper)	Judith of Werle-Waren before 1427 no children Ingeborg of Pomerania-Stolp after 1427 two children Margaret of Brunswick-Lüneburg; 1452 two children	1466; Stargard aged 60-61	Children of Ulrich I, ruled jointly.
Regency of Albert V, Duke of Mecklenburg (1422-1423) and Catherine of Saxe-Lauenburg (1422-1436)						Sons of John IV, reunited the parts held by the coregency period (1379-1423).
Henry IV the Fat	1417; First son of John IV and Catherine of Saxe-Lauenburg	16 October 1422 – 9 March 1477	Duchy of Mecklenburg (part 3 until 1423; all 3 parts since 1423)	Dorothea of Brandenburg; May 1432 seven children	9 March 1477 aged 59-60	Sons of John IV, reunited the parts held by the coregency period (1379-1423).
John V	1418; Second son of John IV and Catherine of Saxe-Lauenburg	16 October 1422 – 1442	Duchy of Mecklenburg (part 3 until 1423; all 3 parts since 1423)	Anna of Pomerania-Stettin; 17 September 1436 no children	1442 aged 23-24	Sons of John IV, reunited the parts held by the coregency period (1379-1423).
Regency of Sophia of Pomerania-Barth (1436-1439?)						Inherited the possessions of her mother (who lived at Barth after William's death), possibly even owing them with her. The claim was made official after the agreement between Sophia and her Mecklenburg relatives in 1441.
Catharina	1427; Daughter of William and Sophia of Pomerania-Barth	8 September 1436 – 13 January 1480	Lordship of Werle (at Barth, Zingst and Damgarten)	Ulrich II, Duke of Stargard; 1454 two children	13 January 1480 aged 52-53	Inherited the possessions of her mother (who lived at Barth after William's death), possibly even owing them with her. The claim was made official after the agreement between Sophia and her Mecklenburg relatives in 1441.
Barth, Zingst and Daumgarten were annexed to Mecklenburg or returned to Pomerania
Margaret of Brunswick-Lüneburg	1442; Daughter of Frederick II, Duke of Brunswick-Lüneburg and Magdalene of Brandenburg	1466 – 8 April 1512	Duchy of Stargard (at Plau am See)	Henry, Duke of Stargard; 1452 two children	8 April 1512; Wienhausen aged 69-70	Heirs of Henry. While the dispute over Margaret's dower seat lasted until her death, she saw the end of her husband's line of descendants, as her stepson Ulrich left no male heirs: Stargard was reunited to Mecklenburg.
Ulrich II	c.1425 Stargard; Son of Henry and Ingeborg of Pomerania-Stolp	1466 – 13 July 1471	Duchy of Stargard (at Stargard proper)	Catharina of Werle; 1454 two children	13 July 1471; Stargard aged 52-53	Heirs of Henry. While the dispute over Margaret's dower seat lasted until her death, she saw the end of her husband's line of descendants, as her stepson Ulrich left no male heirs: Stargard was reunited to Mecklenburg.
Stargard and Plau am See was definitely annexed to Mecklenburg
John VI	1439; Second son of Henry IV and Dorothea of Brandenburg	1471 – 1474	Duchy of Güstrow (separation from the Duchy of Mecklenburg)	Unmarried	1474; Kulmbach aged 34-35	He was assigned by his father, in 1471, the duchy of Güstrow, as a separate, but dependent feud of Mecklenburg. After his death without descendants, he was succeeded by another brother.
Albert VI	1439; First son of Henry IV and Dorothea of Brandenburg	1474 – 9 March 1477	Duchy of Güstrow	Catherine of Lindow-Ruppin; 1466 or 1468 no children	16 February 1483 aged 44-45	Surviving heirs of Henry IV, ruled jointly (Albert was ruling Güstrow separately since 1474).
Albert VI	1439; First son of Henry IV and Dorothea of Brandenburg	9 March 1477 – 16 February 1483	Duchy of Mecklenburg (with Gustrow)	Catherine of Lindow-Ruppin; 1466 or 1468 no children	16 February 1483 aged 44-45	Surviving heirs of Henry IV, ruled jointly (Albert was ruling Güstrow separately since 1474).
Magnus II	1441; Third son of Henry IV and Dorothea of Brandenburg	9 March 1477 – 20 November 1503	Duchy of Mecklenburg (with Gustrow)	Sophia of Pomerania-Stettin; 29 May 1478 seven children	20 November 1503; Wismar aged 61-62	Surviving heirs of Henry IV, ruled jointly (Albert was ruling Güstrow separately since 1474).
Balthasar	1451; Fourth son of Henry IV and Dorothea of Brandenburg	13 January 1480 – 16 March 1507	Duchy of Mecklenburg (with Gustrow)	Unmarried	16 March 1507; Wismar aged 55-56	Surviving heirs of Henry IV, ruled jointly (Albert was ruling Güstrow separately since 1474).
Güstrow was annexed to Mecklenburg
Henry V the Peaceful	3 May 1479; Schwerin; First son of Magnus II and Sophia of Pomerania-Stettin	20 November 1503 – 6 February 1552	Duchy of Schwerin	Ursula of Brandenburg; 12 December 1505 three children Helen of the Palatinate; 12 June 1513; Wismar three children Ursula of Saxe-Lauenburg; 14 May 1551; Schwerin no children	6 February 1552; Schwerin aged 72	Children of Magnus II, ruled jointly with their uncle until 1507, and still together until 1520, when a new inheritance division was made.
Eric II	3 September 1483; Schwerin; Second son of Magnus II and Sophia of Pomerania-Stettin	20 November 1503 – 22 December 1508	Duchy of Mecklenburg	Unmarried	22 December 1508; Schwerin aged 25	Children of Magnus II, ruled jointly with their uncle until 1507, and still together until 1520, when a new inheritance division was made.
Albert VII the Handsome	25 July 1486; Schwerin; Third son of Magnus II and Sophia of Pomerania-Stettin	20 November 1503 – 7 January 1547	Duchy of Güstrow	Anna of Brandenburg; 17 January 1524; Berlin ten children	7 January 1547; Schwerin aged 60	Children of Magnus II, ruled jointly with their uncle until 1507, and still together until 1520, when a new inheritance division was made.
Regency of John Albert I, Duke of Güstrow (1552-1557)						Mentally disabled, ruled under regency of his cousin.
Philip	12 September 1514; Schwerin; Son of Henry V and Helen of the Palatinate	6 February 1552 – 4 January 1557	Duchy of Schwerin	Unmarried	4 January 1557; Güstrow aged 42	Mentally disabled, ruled under regency of his cousin.
John Albert I	23 December 1525; Güstrow; Second son of Albert VII and Anna of Brandenburg	7 January 1547 – 4 January 1557	Duchy of Güstrow	Anna Sophia of Prussia; 24 February 1555; Wismar three children	12 February 1576; Schwerin aged 50	Children of Albert VII. John Albert, inherited Güstrow, but also held regency for his disabled cousin in Schwerin. After the latter's death, John Albert occupied Schwerin and left Güstrow to his brother Ulrich. Therefore, both duchies were ruled, from then on, by descendants of Albert VII. Also, a duchy at Gadebusch was created for a third son, Christopher.
John Albert I	23 December 1525; Güstrow; Second son of Albert VII and Anna of Brandenburg	4 January 1557 – 12 February 1576	Duchy of Schwerin	Anna Sophia of Prussia; 24 February 1555; Wismar three children	12 February 1576; Schwerin aged 50	Children of Albert VII. John Albert, inherited Güstrow, but also held regency for his disabled cousin in Schwerin. After the latter's death, John Albert occupied Schwerin and left Güstrow to his brother Ulrich. Therefore, both duchies were ruled, from then on, by descendants of Albert VII. Also, a duchy at Gadebusch was created for a third son, Christopher.
Ulrich III	5 March 1527; Schwerin; Third son of Albert VII and Anna of Brandenburg	4 January 1557 – 14 March 1603	Duchy of Güstrow	Elizabeth of Denmark; 14 February 1556 one child Anna of Pomerania-Wolgast; 9 December 1588; Wołogoszcz no children	14 March 1603; Güstrow aged 76	Children of Albert VII. John Albert, inherited Güstrow, but also held regency for his disabled cousin in Schwerin. After the latter's death, John Albert occupied Schwerin and left Güstrow to his brother Ulrich. Therefore, both duchies were ruled, from then on, by descendants of Albert VII. Also, a duchy at Gadebusch was created for a third son, Christopher.
Christopher	5 March 1527; Augsburg; Seventh son of Albert VII and Anna of Brandenburg	4 January 1557 – 4 March 1592	Duchy of Güstrow (at Gadebusch)	Dorothea of Denmark; 27 October 1573; Kolding no children Elisabeth of Sweden; 7 May 1581; Stockholm one child	4 March 1592 near Brüel aged 54	Children of Albert VII. John Albert, inherited Güstrow, but also held regency for his disabled cousin in Schwerin. After the latter's death, John Albert occupied Schwerin and left Güstrow to his brother Ulrich. Therefore, both duchies were ruled, from then on, by descendants of Albert VII. Also, a duchy at Gadebusch was created for a third son, Christopher.
Gadebusch reannexed to Güstrow
John VII	7 March 1558; Güstrow; First son of John Albert I and Anna Sophia of Prussia	12 February 1576 – 22 March 1592	Duchy of Schwerin	Sophia of Holstein-Gottorp; 17 February 1588 three children	22 March 1592; Stargard aged 34	Children of John Albert I, divided their inheritance.
Sigismund Augustus	11 November 1560; Schwerin; Second son of John Albert I and Anna Sophia of Prussia	12 February 1576 – 5 September 1600	Duchy of Schwerin (at Neustrelitz, Mirow and Ivenack)	Clara Maria of Pomerania-Barth; 7 October 1593; Barth three children	5 September 1600; Ivenack aged 39	Children of John Albert I, divided their inheritance.
Neustrelitz, Mirow and Ivenack reannexed to Schwerin
Sophia of Holstein-Gottorp	1 June 1569; Gottorf; Daughter of Adolph, Duke of Holstein-Gottorp and Christine of Hesse	22 March 1592 – 14 November 1634	Duchy of Schwerin (at Lübz, Rehna and Wittenburg)	John VII; 17 February 1588 three children	14 November 1634; Schwerin aged 65	Received a widow seat, and in 1603, held regency for her sons. After her death the seats returned to the main duchy.
Regencies of Ulrich III, Duke of Güstrow and Sigismund Augustus, Duke of Strelitz (1592-1603) and Sophia of Holstein-Gottorp (1603-1608)						In 1628, the Emperor Ferdinand II deposed him and took his fiefs from him, but he was reinstated in 1631. In the period 1628-1631 the duchy was ruled by Albrecht von Wallenstein.
Adolph Frederick I the Glorious	15 December 1588; Schwerin; First son of John VII and Sophia of Holstein-Gottorp	22 March 1592 – 1628 1631 – 27 February 1658	Duchy of Schwerin	Anna Maria of East Frisia; 4 September 1622 eight children Maria Catharina of Brunswick-Dannenberg; 1635 eleven children	27 February 1658; Schwerin aged 69	In 1628, the Emperor Ferdinand II deposed him and took his fiefs from him, but he was reinstated in 1631. In the period 1628-1631 the duchy was ruled by Albrecht von Wallenstein.
Charles I	28 December 1540; Neustadt; Eighth son of Albert VII and Anna of Brandenburg	14 March 1603 – 22 July 1610	Duchy of Güstrow	Unmarried	22 July 1610; Neustadt aged 69	Last son of Albert VII, also left no descendants.
John Albert II	5 May 1590; Waren; Second son of John VII and Sophia of Holstein-Gottorp	22 July 1610 – 1628 1631 – 23 April 1636	Duchy of Güstrow	Margaret Elizabeth of Mecklenburg-Güstrow; 9 October 1608 four children Elizabeth of Hesse Kassel; 25 March 1618; Kassel no children Eleonore Marie of Anhalt-Bernburg; 7 May 1626; Güstrow five children	23 April 1636; Güstrow aged 45	A new line from Schwerin was installed at Gustrow. In 1628, the Emperor Ferdinand II deposed him and took his fiefs from him, but he was reinstated in 1631. In the period 1628-1631 the duchy was ruled by Albrecht von Wallenstein.
Regency of Adolph Frederick I, Duke of Schwerin (1636-1654)						His male heirs predeceased him. The majority of his lands rejoined Mecklenburg.
Gustav Adolph	26 February 1633; Güstrow; Second son of John Albert II and Eleonore Marie of Anhalt-Bernburg	23 April 1636 – 6 October 1695	Duchy of Güstrow	Magdalena Sibylla of Holstein-Gottorp; 28 December 1654 eleven children	6 October 1695; Güstrow aged 62	His male heirs predeceased him. The majority of his lands rejoined Mecklenburg.
Güstrow (with exceptions) annexed to Schwerin
Christian Louis I	1 December 1623; Schwerin; Son of Adolph Frederick I and Anna Maria of East Frisia	27 February 1658 – 21 June 1692	Duchy of Schwerin	Christine Margaret of Mecklenburg-Güstrow; 21 February 1640 no children Élisabeth Angelique de Montmorency; 3 March 1664 no children	21 June 1692; The Hague aged 68	Children of Adolf Frederick I, divided the land. AS Christian left no descendants, he was succeeded by his brother Frederick's son.
Frederick I	13 February 1638; Schwerin; First son of Adolph Frederick I and Maria Catharina of Brunswick-Dannenberg	27 February 1658 – 28 April 1688	Duchy of Schwerin (at Grabow)	Christine Wilhelmine of Hesse-Homburg; 28 May 1671 four children	28 April 1688; Grabow aged 50	Children of Adolf Frederick I, divided the land. AS Christian left no descendants, he was succeeded by his brother Frederick's son.
Grabow annexed to Schwerin
Frederick William	28 March 1675; Grabow; First son of Frederick and Christine Wilhelmine of Hesse-Homburg	21 June 1692 – 31 July 1713	Duchy of Schwerin	Sophie Charlotte of Hesse-Kassel; 2 January 1704; Kassel no children	31 July 1713; Mainz aged 38	Reunited the majority of Gustrow under Schwerin, but ceded Strelitz to his uncle, Adolph Frederick II, in 1701.
Magdalena Sibylla of Holstein-Gottorp	14 November 1631; Gottorf; Daughter of Frederick III, Duke of Holstein-Gottorp and Marie Elisabeth of Saxony	6 October 1695 – 22 September 1719	Duchy of Güstrow (at Güstrow only)	Gustav Adolph; 28 December 1654 eleven children	22 September 1719; Güstrow aged 87	Possible heiresses of Gustav Adolph. Magdalena Sibylla, as widow, kept a seat at Güstrow, which joined her late husband's patrimony into Schwerin after her death. Her daughter Maria possibly held Strelitz, once it was part of Güstrow and was, from 1701, settled as her husband's capital.
Maria	19 July 1659; Güstrow; Daughter of Gustav Adolph and Magdalena Sibylla of Holstein-Gottorp	6 October 1695 – 16 January 1701	Duchy of Güstrow (possibly at Neustrelitz only)	Adolph Frederick II; 23 September 1684; Güstrow five children	16 January 1701; Neustrelitz aged 41	Possible heiresses of Gustav Adolph. Magdalena Sibylla, as widow, kept a seat at Güstrow, which joined her late husband's patrimony into Schwerin after her death. Her daughter Maria possibly held Strelitz, once it was part of Güstrow and was, from 1701, settled as her husband's capital.
Güstrow annexed to Mecklenburg-Schwerin; Neustrelitz annexed to Mecklenburg-Strelitz
Adolph Frederick II	19 October 1658; Grabow; Sixth son (posthumous) of Adolph Frederick I and Maria Catharina of Brunswick-Dannenberg	6 October 1695 – 8 March 1701	Duchy of Güstrow (possibly at Neustrelitz)	Maria; 23 September 1684; Güstrow five children Joanna of Saxe-Gotha-Altenburg; 20 June 1702 no children Christiane Emilie of Schwarzburg-Sondershausen; 10 June 1705; Neustrelitz two children	12 May 1708; Neustrelitz aged 67	Married the (possible) heiress of Strelitz, and in 1701 was given a whole duchy with capital at this town.
Adolph Frederick II	19 October 1658; Grabow; Sixth son (posthumous) of Adolph Frederick I and Maria Catharina of Brunswick-Dannenberg	8 March 1701 – 12 May 1708	Duchy of Strelitz	Maria; 23 September 1684; Güstrow five children Joanna of Saxe-Gotha-Altenburg; 20 June 1702 no children Christiane Emilie of Schwarzburg-Sondershausen; 10 June 1705; Neustrelitz two children	12 May 1708; Neustrelitz aged 67	Married the (possible) heiress of Strelitz, and in 1701 was given a whole duchy with capital at this town.
Adolph Frederick III	7 June 1686; Neustrelitz; Son of Adolph Frederick II and Maria	12 May 1708 – 11 December 1752	Duchy of Strelitz	Dorothea of Holstein-Plön; 16 April 1709; Reinfeld two children	11 December 1752; Neustrelitz aged 66	Children of Adolphus Frederick II, divided their inheritance.
Charles Louis	23 February 1708; Neustrelitz; Son of Adolph Frederick II and Christiane Emilie of Schwarzburg-Sondershausen	12 May 1708 – 5 June 1752	Duchy of Strelitz (at Mirow)	Elisabeth Albertine of Saxe-Hildburghausen; 5 February 1735; Eisfeld ten children	5 June 1752; Mirow aged 44	Children of Adolphus Frederick II, divided their inheritance.
Mirow reannexed to Strelitz
Charles Leopold	26 November 1678; Grabow; Second son of Frederick and Christine Wilhelmine of Hesse-Homburg	31 July 1713 – 28 November 1747 (only de jure from 1728)	Duchy of Schwerin	Sophia Hedwig of Nassau-Dietz; 27 May 1709; Leeuwarden no children Christine von Lepel; 7 June 1710; Doberau (morganatic; annulled 2 October 1711) no children Catherine Ivanovna of Russia; 19 April 1716; Danzig one child	28 November 1747; Dömitz aged 69	Deposed in 1728 by the Aulic Council in Vienna in favour of his brother Christian Louis II, for incapacity. His daughter was Anna Leopoldovna, regent of Russia (1740-1741).
Christian Louis II	15 November 1683; Grabow; Third son of Frederick and Christine Wilhelmine of Hesse-Homburg	28 November 1747 – 30 May 1756 (ruling de facto as regent since 1728)	Duchy of Schwerin	Gustave Caroline of Mecklenburg-Strelitz; 13 November 1714 five children	30 May 1756; Schwerin aged 73	
Regency of Elisabeth Albertine of Saxe-Hildburghausen (1752-1753)						Left no heirs. He was succeeded by his brother.
Adolph Frederick IV	5 May 1738; Mirow; First son of Charles Louis and Elisabeth Albertine of Saxe-Hildburghausen	11 December 1752 – 2 June 1794	Duchy of Strelitz	Unmarried	2 June 1794; Neustrelitz aged 56	Left no heirs. He was succeeded by his brother.
Frederick II the Pious	9 November 1717; Schwerin; Son of Christian Louis II and Gustave Caroline of Mecklenburg-Strelitz	30 May 1756 – 24 April 1785	Duchy of Schwerin	Louise Frederica of Württemberg; 2 March 1746; Schwedt four children	24 April 1785; Ludwigslust aged 56	His heirs died in infancy and was succeeded by his nephew.
Frederick Francis I	10 December 1756; Schwerin; Son of Louis of Mecklenburg-Schwerin and Charlotte Sophie of Saxe-Coburg-Saalfeld	24 April 1785 – 1 February 1837	Duchy of Schwerin (until 1815) Grand Duchy of Schwerin (from 1815)	Louise of Saxe-Gotha-Altenburg; 1 June 1775; Gotha six children	1 February 1837; Ludwigslust aged 56	Son of Louis, brother of Frederick II. In 1815 was raised to Grand Duke.
Charles II	10 October 1741; Mirow; Second son of Charles Louis and Elisabeth Albertine of Saxe-Hildburghausen	2 June 1794 – 6 November 1816	Duchy of Strelitz (until 1815) Grand Duchy of Strelitz (from 1815)	Frederica of Hesse-Darmstadt; 18 September 1768; Darmstadt ten children Charlotte of Hesse-Darmstadt; 28 September 1784; Darmstadt one child	6 November 1816; Neustrelitz aged 75	Elevated to Grand Duke in 1815.
George	12 August 1779; Hanover; Son of Charles II and Frederica of Hesse-Darmstadt	6 November 1816 – 6 September 1860	Grand Duchy of Strelitz	Marie of Hesse-Kassel; 12 August 1817; Kassel four children	6 September 1860; Neustrelitz aged 81	
Paul Frederick	15 September 1800; Ludwigslust; Son of Frederick Louis of Mecklenburg-Schwerin and Elena Pavlovna of Russia	1 February 1837 – 7 March 1842	Grand Duchy of Schwerin	Alexandrine of Prussia; 25 May 1822; Berlin no children	7 March 1842; Schwerin aged 41	Grandson of Frederick Francis I.
Frederick Francis II	28 February 1823; Ludwigslust; Son of Paul Frederick and Alexandrine of Prussia	7 March 1842 – 15 April 1883	Grand Duchy of Schwerin	Augusta Reuss of Middle Köstritz; 3 November 1849; Ludwigslust six children Anne of Hesse and by Rhine; 4 July 1864; Darmstadt one child Marie of Schwarzburg-Rudolstadt; 4 July 1868; Rudolstadt four children	15 April 1883; Schwerin aged 60	
Frederick William	17 October 1819; Neustrelitz; Son of George and Marie of Hesse-Kassel	6 September 1860 – 30 May 1904	Grand Duchy of Strelitz	Augusta of the United Kingdom; 28 June 1843; London two children	30 May 1904; Neustrelitz aged 84	
Frederick Francis III	19 March 1851; Ludwigslust; Son of Frederick Francis II and Augusta Reuss of Middle Köstritz	15 April 1883 – 10 April 1897	Grand Duchy of Schwerin	Anastasia Mikhailovna of Russia; 24 January 1879; Saint Petersburg three children	10 April 1897; Cannes aged 46	
Regency of John Albert of Mecklenburg (1897-1901)						Forced to abdicate in 1918, after the end of World War I.
Frederick Francis IV	9 April 1882; Palermo; Son of Frederick Francis III and Anastasia Mikhailovna of Russia	10 April 1897 – 14 November 1918	Grand Duchy of Schwerin	Alexandra of Hanover and Cumberland; 7 June 1904; Gmunden five children	17 November 1945; Flensburg aged 63	Forced to abdicate in 1918, after the end of World War I.
Adolph Frederick V	22 July 1848; Neustrelitz; Son of Frederick William and Augusta of the United Kingdom	30 May 1904 – 11 June 1914	Grand Duchy of Strelitz	Elisabeth of Anhalt; 17 April 1877; Dessau four children	11 June 1914; Berlin aged 65	
Adolph Frederick VI	17 June 1882; Neustrelitz; Son of Adolph Frederick V and Elisabeth of Anhalt	11 June 1914 – 23 February 1918	Grand Duchy of Strelitz	Unmarried	23 February 1918; Neustrelitz aged 35	Committed suicide in 1918, before the end of World War I.

== Bibliography ==
- Friedrich Wigger: Stammtafeln des Großherzoglichen Hauses von Meklenburg. In: Jahrbücher des Vereins für Mecklenburgische Geschichte und Altertumskunde 50 (1885), p. 111ff. (Digitalised)
- Thomas Nugent: The History Of Vandalia: Containing The Ancient And Present State, volume 2, Selbstverl, 1769 (Digitalised
