= Partitions of Mecklenburg =

During its history, the state of Mecklenburg has been repeatedly partitioned into various successor states (lordships, duchies, grand duchies). Modern historians distinguish three main Partitions of Mecklenburg:

== First partition of Mecklenburg ==
Mecklenburg after the first partition

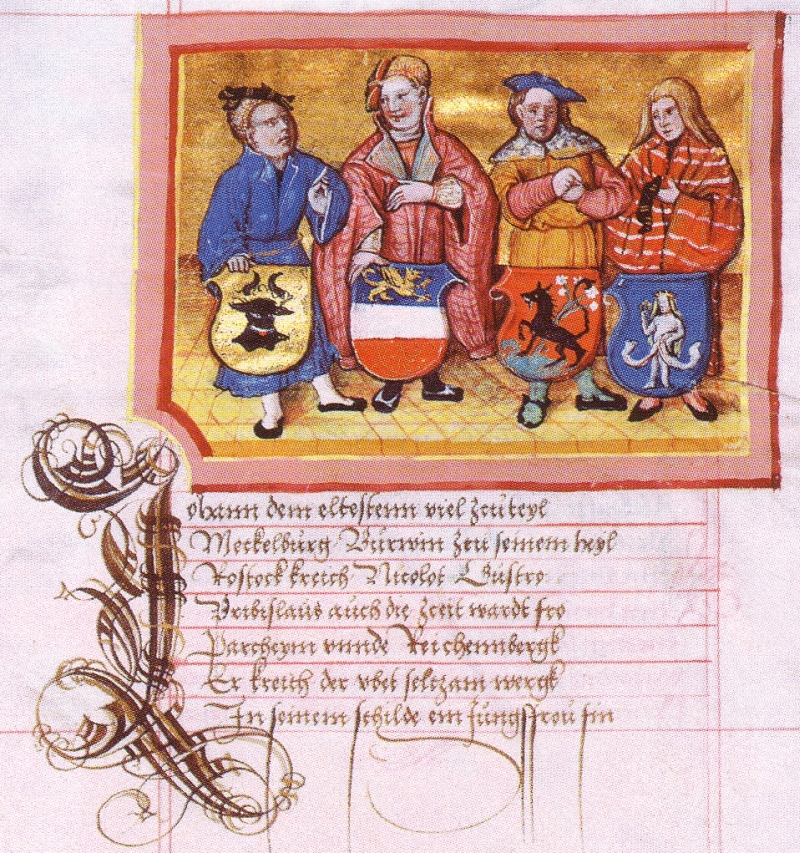
Depiction by Nicolaus Marschalk in the Chronicon der mecklenburgischen Regenten (Chronicon of the Mecklenbugian Regents) around 1520

The first partition of Mecklenburg was carried out in 1234 by the heirs of Henry Borwin II, Lord of Mecklenburg. It was a result of the Realteilung (partition due to partible inheritance) of the territory into four Herrschaften (lordships) or Fürstentümer (principalities): Mecklenburg, Parchim (later Parchim-Richenberg), Werle and Rostock.

- John received the Lordship of Mecklenburg: Mecklenburg Castle, Dassow, Klütz, Bresen (Grevesmühlen), Gadebusch, Poel, Ilow, Bug (Bukow), Brüel and Kussin (Neukloster)
- Pribislaw received the Lordship of Parchim: Parchim, Sternberg, Brenz (Neustadt), Ture (Lübz) and Quetzin (Plau-Goldberg)
- Nicholas received the Lordship of Werle: Werle, Bisede (Güstrow), Teterow, Laage, Krakow, Malchow, Vipperow (Röbel), Turne and Liese. Later, possessions in Pomerania were added: Dargun, Malchin, Tucen and Gödebant-Tützen, Gädebehn (Stavenhagen), Sone-Schlön (Waren/Müritz), as well as Wustrow (Penzlin)
- Henry received the Lordship of Rostock: Kessin (Rostock), Kröpelin, Doberan, Ribnitz, Marlow, Sülze and Tessin; Gnoien and Kalen were later added.

The effects of the first partition lasted until 1471, when the territories were reunited by Henry IV, Duke of Mecklenburg through inheritance.

== Second partition of Mecklenburg ==
The second partition of Mecklenburg took place in 1621 as a result of the Fahrenholzer Vertrag: a partition agreement, resulting in the Realteilung into the Duchy of Mecklenburg-Schwerin and Mecklenburg-Güstrow. Although this division already existed (with interruptions) after the death of Henry IV in 1477 and again after 1520 (after the Neubrandenburger Hausvertrag (New Brandenburg House Contract)), it was only in the form of an allocation of Ämter (singular Amt; a type of administrative division), while general governance remained unified.

In the agreement, Adolf Frederick I received the princely state of Schwerin, while his brother John Albert II received the land centred on Güstrow.

The divisions had little historical basis. The most important goals were to divide the amount of territory and income as evenly as possible. In order to achieve this, Schwerin received the previously Güstrow-aligned Ämter of Grabow, Gorlosen, Marnitz, Neukloster and Sternberg including the Abbey of Walsmühlen while Güstrow received the Ämter of Strelitz, Goldberg, Wredenhagen and Fürstenberg from Schwerin.

Therefore, the two portions consisted of the following Ämter:

Schwerin: Schwerin, Crivitz, Neubukow, Poel, Doberan, Mecklenburg, Gadebusch, Zarrentin, Neustadt Eldena, Dömitz, Neukloster, Sternberg, Lübz, Rehna, Wittenburg, Marnitz, Grabow, Grevesmühlen, Walsmühlen and Gorlosen
Güstrow: Güstrow, Schwaan, Ribnitz, Gnoien, Dargun, Neukalen, Stavenhagen, Plan, Stargard, Broda, Feldberg, Wesenberg, Strelitz, Goldberg, Boizenburg, Wredenhagen, Fürstenberg, Ivenack and Wanzka

Note however that the Ämter of Wredenhagen, Fürstenberg, Ivenack and Wanzka were de facto controlled by Pomerania.

The cities were divided such that Schwerin received: Wismar, along with all the princely houses, Schwerin, Parchim, Waren and Kröpelin; the noble towns of Brüel, Malchow and Dassow, as well as Dömitz and Zarrentin. Güstrow received: Güstrow, Laage, Krakow, Malchin, Robel, Teterow, Neubrandenburg, Friedland, Woldegk, Penzlin, Sülze and Marlow. It also gained the Elbe (despite its remoteness from Güstrow) as a result of gaining the Amt of Boizenburg.

The town of Rostock including Warnemünde remained a joint possession, as did the state's four Abbeys: Dobbertin, Malchow, Ribnitz and the Abbey of the Holy Cross in Rostock. The courts (Hofgericht and Landgericht), the Papal consistory, the State Diet, border disputes, the cost of the Reichskammergericht etc. also remained joint concerns.

== Third partition of Mecklenburg ==
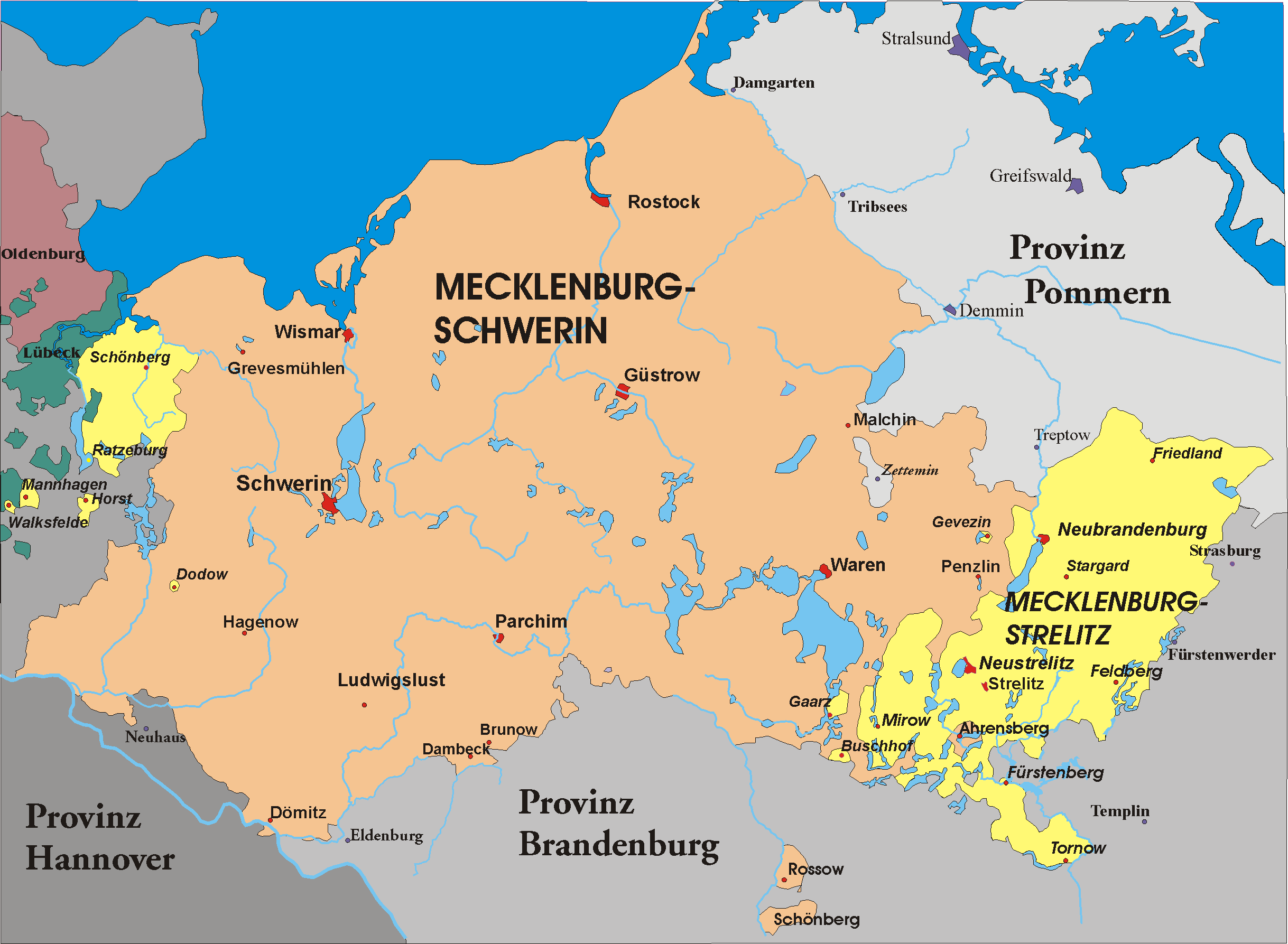
Mecklenburg after the third partition of Mecklenburg

The third partition of Mecklenburg occurred as a result of the Treaty of Hamburg (1701) and divided the inheritance of territory of Mecklenburg-Güstrow between Mecklenburg-Schwerin and the newly formed Duchy of Mecklenburg-Strelitz. These divisions would last until the end of the monarchy in 1918/19, albeit with reduced autonomy, and after that as the Free States of Mecklenburg-Schwerin and Mecklenburg-Strelitz during the Weimar Republic. The two states were reunited in 1934 under Nazi influence.
