= Henry Borwin =

Henry Borwin may refer to:

- Henry Borwin I, Lord of Mecklenburg (died 1227), reigned 1178 to 1219
- Henry Borwin II, Lord of Mecklenburg (1170–1226), reigned 1219 to 1226
- Henry Borwin III, Lord of Rostock (c. 1220–1278), reigned 1226 to 1234 (jointly) and 1234 to 1278 (alone)
