= Nicholas I of Rostock =

Ruler of Rostock from 1282 to 1312

Nicholas I, Lord of Rostock
- Born: before 1262
- Died: 25 November 1314
- Buried: St. John's monastery, Rostock
- Noble family: House of Mecklenburg
- Spouse: Margaret of Pomerania-Wolgast
- Father: Waldemar, Lord of Rostock
- Mother: Agnes of Holstein-Kiel

Nicholas, Lord of Rostock, nicknamed the child (before 1262 – 25 November 1314) was a member of the House of Mecklenburg. He was co-ruler of Rostock from 1282 to 1284, and the sole ruler from 1284 to 1312.

== Life ==
He was the youngest son of Waldemar and his wife Agnes of Holstein-Kiel. His elder brothers John and Henry Borwin died before 1285, so that he became the sole ruler, initially under the regency of his mother. After several failed attempts by the Lord of Mecklenburg and Werle, the other two Lordships ruled by the House of Mecklenburg, to conquer Rostock, he put his territory under the protection and feudal overlordship of King Eric VI of Denmark. Eric VI successfully defended Rostock; however, he then removed Nicholas from power and took Rostock for himself.

In 1311, Lord Henry II of Mecklenburg launched a new attempt to take the City of Rostock. He succeeded on 15 December 1312.

When Nicholas died on 25 November 1314, the Lordship of Rostock initially fell to Denmark. Nicholas was buried in the Dominican St. John's monastery in Rostock.

Another war broke out between Denmark and Mecklenburg. Henry II conquered the rest of the Lordship of Rostock. In a peace treaty between Henry II and King Christopher II of Denmark signed on 21 May 1323, Henry was given the Lordships of Rostock, Gnoien and Schwaan as hereditary Danish fiefs and Rostock ceased to exist as a separate principality.

== Marriage and issue ==
Nicholas was engaged to be married several times. First with Euphemia, the daughter of Count Günther of Lindow. On the advice of Heinrich II. (Mecklenburg), he broke off the engagement with Euphemia and was instead engaged with Henry II's sister-in-law Margarete, the daughter of Margrave Albert III of Brandenburg. In 1299, he eventually married Margaret, the daughter of Duke Bogislaw IV of Pomerania-Wolgast (d. 14 January 1316). They had one daughter:

- Elisabeth, married on 16 February 1317 to Count Christian of Oldenburg-Delmenhorst. Two of her sons were canons: John in Bremen and Cologne, and Christian in Bremen and Osnabrück

Nicholas I of Rostock House of Mecklenburg Born: before 1262 Died: 25 November 1314
Preceded by Waldemar	Lord of Rostock; 1282-1312	Succeeded by Eric IV as King of Denmark
