= Sophia of Sweden =

Sophia of Sweden, also Sophie or Sofia, may refer to:

- Sophia Eriksdotter (died 1241), daughter of King Eric X of Sweden, married Henry Borwin III, Lord of Rostock
- Sophia of Denmark (1241–1286), queen consort of Sweden
- Princess Sophia of Sweden (1547–1611), daughter of King Gustav Vasa of Sweden and Margareta Leijonhufvud
- Hedvig Sophia of Sweden (1681–1708), daughter of Charles XI of Sweden and Ulrike Eleonore of Denmark
- Sophia Magdalena of Denmark (1746–1813), queen consort of Sweden
- Sophia Albertina, Abbess of Quedlinburg (1753–1829), daughter of King Adolf Frederick of Sweden and Louisa Ulrika of Prussia
- Princess Sophie of Sweden (1801–1865), wife of Leopold, Grand Duke of Baden
- Sophia of Nassau (1836–1913), queen consort of Sweden
- Princess Sofia, Duchess of Värmland (born 1984), wife of Prince Carl Philip, Duke of Värmland
