= First Partition =

First Partition may refer to:

- First Partition of Luxembourg, 1659
- First partition of Mecklenburg, 1234
- First Partition of Poland, 1772
- First partition of the Roman Empire, 285
- First Partition Treaty, 1698, between England and France
- Partition of Bengal (1905), partition of Bengal in British India, abolished 1912
- Primary partition, of a computer hard disk
