= Nicholas I of Mecklenburg =

German noble (before 1164–1200)

Nicholas I, Lord of Mecklenburg
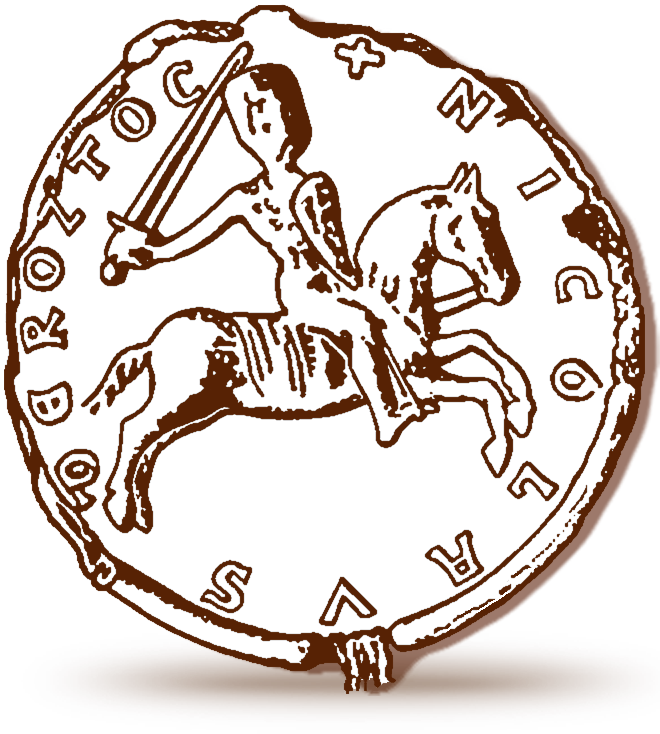
- Born: before 1164
- Died: 25 May 1200; Waschow, now part of Wittendörp
- Noble family: House of Mecklenburg
- Father: Wertislaw

Nicholas I, Lord of Mecklenburg (also known as Niklot I; before 1164 – 25 May 1200, near Waschow, now part of Wittendörp), was the ruling Lord of Mecklenburg from 1178 until his death. He was the son of Wertislaw, Lord of Rostock and Prince of the Obotrites.

He fought together with the Danes and Frederick I against Henry the Lion. Between 1183 and 1185, he fought a war against his cousin Henry Borwin I. Nicholas received support from the Danes; Henry Borwin I received no outside support. King Canute VI of Denmark noticed this lack of support and used the opportunity to strengthen his position on the Baltic Sea coast. In 1185, Nicholas I and Henry Borwin I had to accept Canute VI as their liege lord. In return, Canute enfeoffed Nicholas I with the Lordship of Rostock.

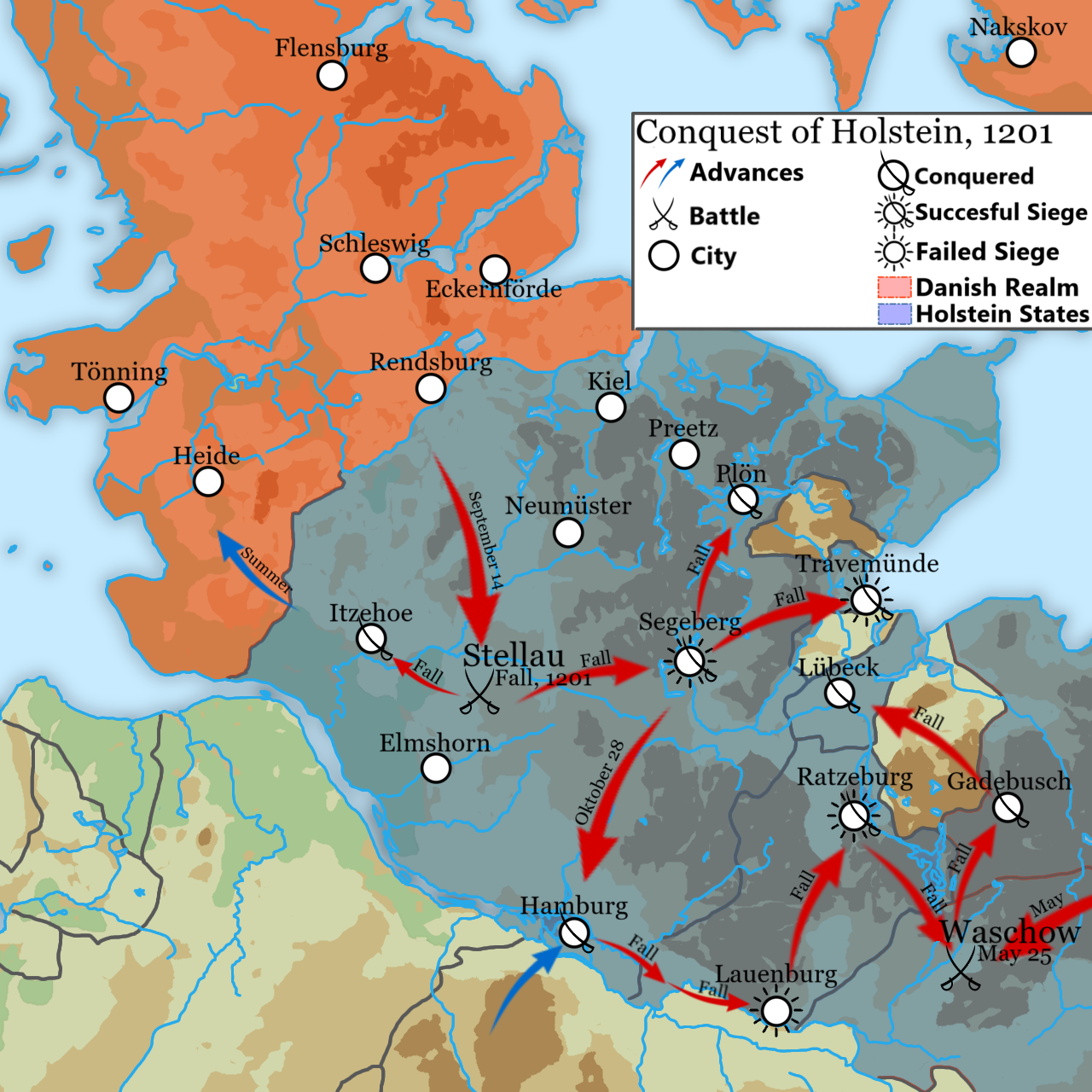
Battle of Waschow and other campaigns of the Danish Empire

On 25 May 1200, Nicholas I and Henry Borwin fought the Battle of Waschow, as part of a war against Count Adolf III of Holstein. The Mecklenburg side won, and secured the area that is now southwestern Mecklenburg. However, Nicholas I fell in this battle.

== Sources ==
- Wigger, Friedrich (1885). "Stammtafeln des Großherzoglichen Hauses von Meklenburg". Jahrbücher des Vereins für Mecklenburgische Geschichte und Altertumskunde. 50: 111–326.

Nicholas I of Mecklenburg House of Mecklenburg Born: before 1164 Died: 25 May 1200
Preceded by Pribislaw	Lord of Mecklenburg; 1178-1200	Succeeded by Henry Borwin I
