= Rudolph I, Bishop of Schwerin =

- Native name: Rudolf I.
- Church: Roman Catholic
- Diocese: Schwerin
- In office: 1249-1262
- Predecessor: William
- Successor: Herman I of Schladen

Personal details
- Died: 1262

Rudolph I (died 1262) was the Roman Catholic bishop of the Diocese of Schwerin and prince of the Prince-Bishopric of Schwerin from 1249 until his death.

In 1239, shortly before the start of Rudolph's term, Bützow had been made the main residence of his prince-bishopric. In 1248, a collegiate church had been founded in Bützow.

Rudolph I is primarily known for his disputes with Duke Pribislaw I of Mecklenburg. To protect his seat in Bützow, he built a castle close to the border between his prince-bishopric and the Lordship of Parchim-Richenberg, in ecclesiastical respect part of his diocese, but not of his prince-bishopric. Pribislaw I saw this castle as a direct threat and burned it down. He imprisoned Rudolph in his dungeon, but soon released him for a small ransom.

Rudolph then tried to overthrow Pribislaw. On his instigation, both an imperial ban and a papal ban were proclaimed against Pribislaw. In 1255, Pribislaw was taken prisoner and handed over to Rudolph. Pribislaw was removed from power and his territory was divided among his brothers and his brother-in-law, the Count of Schwerin. When Rudolph died in 1262, Pribislaw hoped he would be restored to power, but his brothers refused to do this.

Rudolph I, Bishop of Schwerin Died: 1262
Catholic Church titles
Regnal titles
Preceded by William	Prince-Bishop of Schwerin; 1249-1262	Succeeded by Herman I
