= Lordship of Parchim-Richenberg =

Short-lived state of the Holy Roman Empire

Lordship of Parchim-Richenberg Herrschaft (or Fürstentum) Parchim-Richenberg
- 1226–1255
- The lordship of Parchim-Richenberg (red) after the first partition of Mecklenburg
- Status: Lordship
- Capital: Parchim; Richenberg
- Government: Monarchy (Herrschaft)
- Fürst
- History
  - Partitioned from the duchy of Mecklenburg: 1226
  - Prince removed from power. Lordship partitioned between Pribislaw's brothers and the Count of Schwerin: 1255
Preceded by
Duchy of Mecklenburg
Succeeded by
County of Schwerin
Lordship of Mecklenburg	Image missing
Lordship of Rostock
Lordship of Werle
- Today part of: Germany

The Lordship (or Principality) of Parchim-Richenberg (German: (Fürstentum) Herrschaft Parchim-Richenberg) was a short-lived state of the Holy Roman Empire which existed during the 13th century. It arose from the first partition of Mecklenburg after the death of Henry Borwin II, Lord of Mecklenburg in 1226. Initially it was named after its capital Parchim. Later, following the transferral of the seat to Richenberg, the name shifted to Richenberg. The Lordship comprised the lands of Parchim (included Brenz and Rosengarten), the rural area of Ture and the later Vogteis of Plau, Goldberg, Sternberg and finally Richenberg (on the Warnow near Langen Brütz). It was the shortest-lived of the four partitioned principalities of Mecklenburg.

== Pribislaw I ==
The first prince of Parchim-Richenberg was Pribislaw I from the House of Mecklenburg (Obotrites), the youngest son of Henry Borwin II. He grew up at the court of his brother John I, Lord of Mecklenburg. Since Pribislaw was still too young, John managed the lordship for his brother until 1238. Soon after he assumed his full position, border conflicts with the Counts of Schwerin erupted, and he had to cede Brenz and Neustadt-Glewe. After this feud he managed to stabilise the territory economically by founding the towns of Goldberg and Sternberg, and through the settlement of Jews in Parchim. He bestowed the Parchimsche Stadtrecht (Parchim town privileges) on Lübz, Goldberg and Sternberg. In 1249 Parchim New Town was founded on the western shore of the Elde. In 1248 Pribislaw relocated his residence from Parchim to the newly built castle of Richenberg on the Warnow near the village of Kritzow. Thereafter the lordship was also known as Parchim-Richenberg. The reasons for the move are unknown.

After disputes with Rudolf, Bishop of Schwerin Pribislaw was captured and taken to him. Pribislaw was removed from power in 1255 and the Principality was divided between his brothers and his brother-in-law, the Count of Schwerin. Pribislaw went into exile in Pomerania and received the Lordship of Belgard in Farther Pomerania as compensation.
