= Waldemar, Lord of Rostock =

Lord of Rostock from 1278 to 1282

- Born: Before 1241
- Died: 9 November 1282
- Buried: Doberan Minster
- Noble family: House of Mecklenburg
- Spouse: Agnes of Holstein-Kiel
- Father: Henry Borwin III, Lord of Rostock
- Mother: Sophia of Sweden

Waldemar, Lord of Rostock (before 1241 – 9 November 1282) was the ruling Lord of Rostock from 1278 until his death.

He was the second eldest son of Hernry Borwin III and his wife Sophia (d. before 24 June 1241), the daughter of King Erik Knutsson of Sweden. His elder brother John died before his father, so after his father's death, Waldemar inherited Rostock and ruled alone. He died on 9 November 1282, or possibly one day later. He was buried in the Doberan Minster.

According to some sources, he went blind some time before his death and divided his territory between his sons. His sons ruled under the regency of their mother until 1284. From 1286, his youngest son Nicholas ruled alone.

== Marriage and issue ==
Waldemar was married with Agnes, a daughter of Count John I of Kiel. They had three sons:

- Henry Borwin IV (d. before 1285)
- John (d. before 1285)
- Nicholas I (before 1262 – 1314), Lord of Rostock from 1282 to 1312.

Waldemar, Lord of Rostock House of Mecklenburg Cadet branch of the 1282 Born: before Died: 1241 9 November
Preceded by Hernry Borwin III	Lord of Rostock; 1278-1282	Succeeded by Nicholas I
