= Lordship of Rostock =

Lordship of Rostock Herrschaft (or Fürstentum) Rostock
- 1226–1323
- Coat of arms

- The lordship of Rostock ( red) after the first partition of Mecklenburg

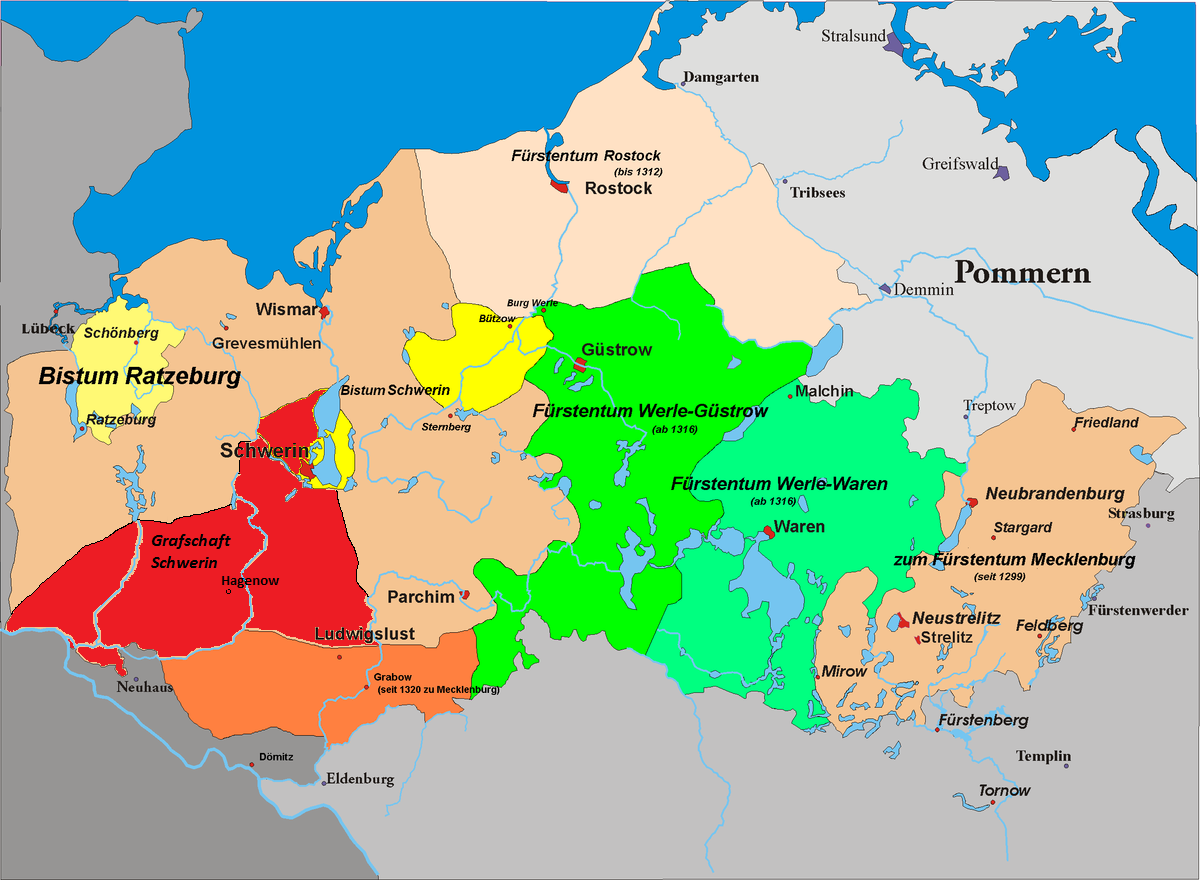
- Rostock ( pale peach) and other Mecklenburgian states in the early 14th century
- Status: Lordship
- Capital: Rostock
- Government: Monarchy (Fürstentum/Herrschaft)
- Fürst
- History
  - Partitioned from the duchy of Mecklenburg: 1226
  - Rostock placed under the protection and overlordship of Denmark: Some time between 1286 and 1312
  - Denmark grants Rostock to Henry II of Mecklenburg as a hereditary fief: 21 May 1323
Preceded by	Succeeded by
Mecklenburg	Mecklenburg
- Today part of: Germany

The Lordship or Principality of Rostock (German: Herrschaft (Fürstentum) Rostock) was a state of the Holy Roman Empire in the 13th and early 14th centuries. It arose from the first partition of Mecklenburg after the death of Henry Borwin II in 1227. It was named after the castle and settlement of Rostock and held the territories of Kessin, Kröpelin, Doberan, Ribnitz, Marlow, Sülze and Tessin in the modern German Bundesland (Federal State) of Mecklenburg-Vorpommern. Later, in 1236 Gnoien and Kalen were added to the lordship's territory.

The first Fürst (prince) of Rostock was Henry Borwin III from the House of Mecklenburg (Obodrites); the last was his grandson Nicholas I "das Kind" (the child).

After some unsuccessful attempts by two other Mecklenburgian lordships, Werle and Mecklenburg, to take control of Rostock, Nicholas I, placed Rostock under the protection and overlordship of Eric VI, King of Denmark. However, after a successful defence Denmark became Rostock's de facto owner. Already by 1311 Henry II, Lord of Mecklenburg sought to take the town of Rostock once more, and succeeded on 15 December 1312. In 1314 Nicholas of Rostock died disempowered and without a male heir. In 1312 the town of Rostock already saw Henry II as a representative of the Danish King. After a further war Henry II conquered Rostock and secured peace with the Danish King Christopher II on 21 May 1323. He received the Lordships of Rostock, Gnoien and Schwaan as hereditary fiefs of Denmark and with that the Lordship of Rostock ceased to exist as an independent entity.
