= Agnes of Holstein-Kiel =

Regent of Rostock

Agnes of Holstein-Kiel (died 1287) was a lady consort of Rostock by marriage to Waldemar, Lord of Rostock. She was regent of Rostock during the minority of her son Nicholas I, Lord of Rostock between 1282 and 1284.

She was daughter of Count John I of Kiel.

== Issue ==
She had the following issue:

- Henry Borwin IV (d. before 1285)
- John (d. before 1285)
- Nicholas I (before 1262 – 1314), Lord of Rostock from 1282 to 1312.
