= Henry Borwin II of Mecklenburg =

Lord of Mecklenburg from 1219 to 1226

Henry Borwin II
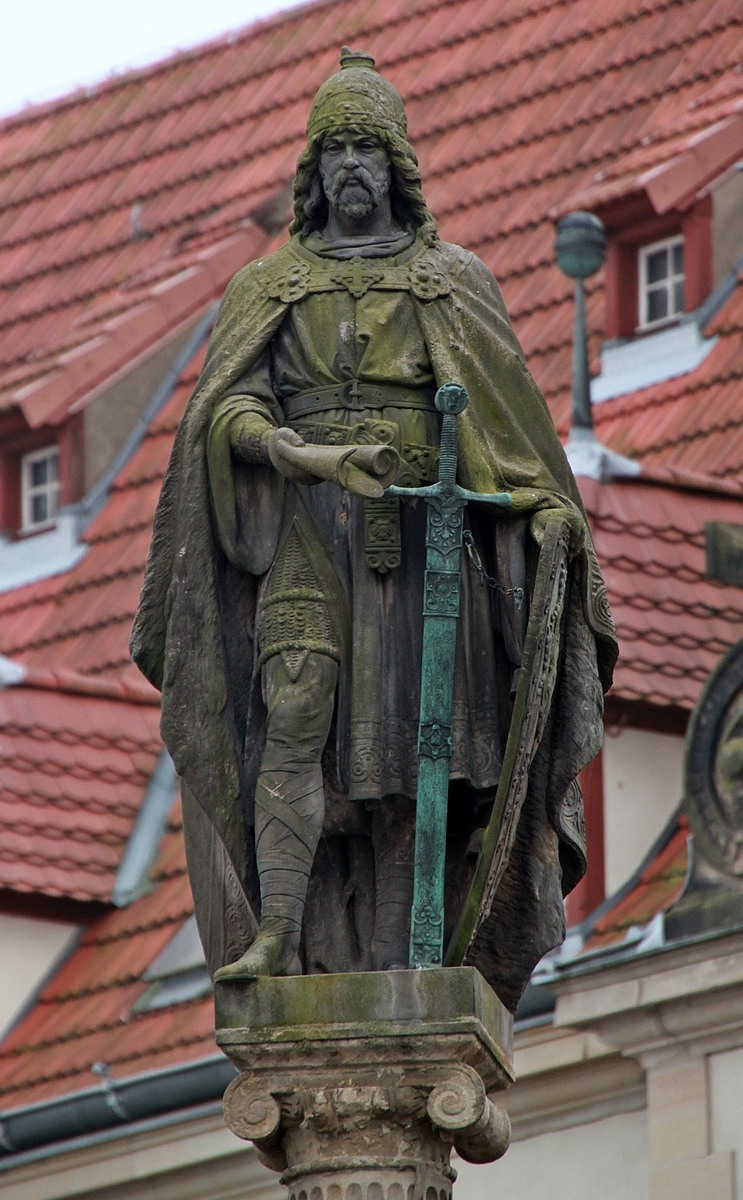
- Statue of Henry Borwin II in Güstrow

Lord of Mecklenburg
- Reign: 1219–1226
- Predecessor: Henry Borwin I
- Successor: John I, Nicholas I, Henry Borwin III, and Pribislaw I
- Born: 1170
- Died: 5 June 1226; Güstrow
- Buried: Doberan Minster
- Noble family: House of Mecklenburg
- Spouse: Christina of Sweden
- Issue: Nicholas I John I the Theologian; Henry Borwin III, Lord of Rostock; Pribislaw I Margaret; Matilda
- Father: Henry Borwin I, Lord of Mecklenburg
- Mother: Matilda of Blieskastel

Henry Borwin II, Lord of Mecklenburg (1170 – 5 June 1226) was a member of the House of Mecklenburg, and was a Prince of Mecklenburg from 1219 to 1226 and Lord of Rostock (1225-1226).

== Life ==
Henry Borwin II was a son of Henry Borwin I, Lord of Mecklenburg and Matilda of Blieskastel. He was the grandson of the Slavic prince Pribislav, the founder of the House of Mecklenburg. After he died in 1226 in Güstrow, his four sons ruled Mecklenburg jointly until 1234. They then divided Mecklenburg into the principalities of Werle, Parchim-Richenberg, Rostock and Mecklenburg.

== Marriage and issue ==
Henry Borwin married in 1200 Christina of Sweden (died: after 20 May 1248), the daughter of King Sverker II of Sweden. They had the following children:

- Nicholas I, Lord of Werle (1210-1277)
- John I the Theologian, Lord of Mecklenburg (1211-1264)
- Henry Borwin III, Lord of Rostock (1220-1278)
- Pribislaw I, Lord of Parchim-Richenberg (1224-1256), died in 1275
- Margaret, (died after 18 August 1267), married in 1230 Count Gunzelin III of Schwerin
- Matilda, (died after 23 November 1270) married 1229 Duke Sambor II of Pomerelia

== Sources ==
- Wigger, Friedrich (1885). "Stammtafeln des Großherzoglichen Hauses von Meklenburg". Jahrbücher des Vereins für Mecklenburgische Geschichte und Altertumskunde. 50: 111–326.

Henry Borwin II of Mecklenburg House of Mecklenburg Born: 1170 Died: 5 December 1226
Preceded by Henry Borwin I	Lord of Mecklenburg; 1219–1226	Succeeded by John I, Nicholas I, Henry Borwin III, and Pribislaw I
