= Kröpelin =

Town in Mecklenburg-Vorpommern, Germany

- Town
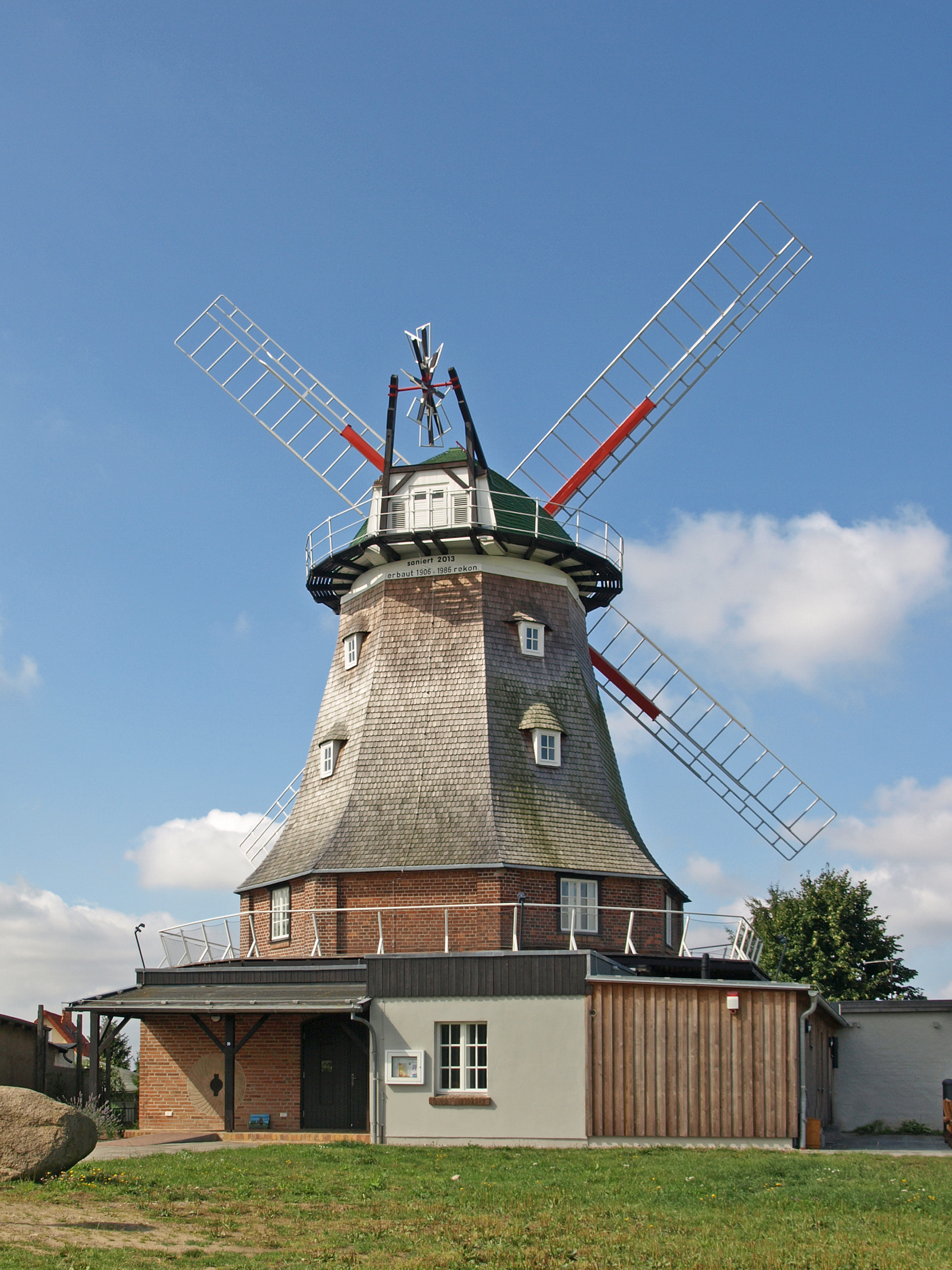
- Windmill in Kröpelin

- Coat of arms

- Location of Kröpelin within Rostock district
- Interactive map of Kröpelin
- Location within Germany Location within Mecklenburg-Vorpommern
- Coordinates: 54°04′N 11°47′E
- Country: Germany
- State: Mecklenburg-Vorpommern
- District: Rostock

Government
  - Mayor: Thomas Gutteck

Area
  - Total: 67.54 km^{2} (26.08 sq mi)
- Elevation: 60 m (200 ft)

Population (2025-12-31)
  - Total: 4,919
  - Density: 72.83/km^{2} (188.6/sq mi)
- Time zone: UTC+01:00 (CET)
  - Summer (DST): UTC+02:00 (CEST)
- Postal codes: 18236
- Dialling codes: 038292, 038294
- Vehicle registration: LRO
- Website: www.kroepelin.de

Kröpelin (German pronunciation: [kʁøːpəˈliːn]) is a town in the Rostock district, in Mecklenburg-Western Pomerania, Germany. It is situated 9 km southwest of Bad Doberan, and 23 km west of Rostock.

Kröpelin first appears in the written record in 1177 as Crapelin a settlement with Wendish origins. The town's name probably derives from the Slavic word crepelice meaning the place of quail. Kröpelin was granted Lubeck rights in 1249. Granted a town charter on 25 August 1250 by Heinrich Borwin III of Rostock it was known as a shoemakers' town based on the number of people who worked in that profession.

The town has experienced a number of devastating fires during its history, in 1377, 1560, 1580, 1738 and 1774.

The early nineteenth century saw Jewish immigration into Kröpelin. The Jewish community built a cemetery outside the town in 1821. During the 1938 November pogrom it was desecrated by the Nazis and then fell until ruin. After the Second World War a memorial stone was erected to those members of the town's Jewish community who had died in the holocaust. In 2012, the cemetery was the subject to a number of antisemitic attacks, including criminal damage and racist graffiti.
