= Henry Borwin III of Rostock =

Henry Borwin III, Lord of Rostock
- Born: c. 1220
- Died: 1 August 1278
- Buried: Doberan
- Noble family: House of Mecklenburg
- Spouse: Sophia of Sweden
- Father: Henry Borwin II, Lord of Mecklenburg
- Mother: Christina of Sweden

Henry Borwin III, Lord of Rostock (c. 1220 – 1 August 1278) was a member of the House of Mecklenburg. He ruled the Lordship of Rostock jointly with his brothers from 1226 to 1234, then ruled alone until his death.

He was the second youngest son of Henry II Borwin, who became Lord of Rostock in 1225. Since Henry Borwin III was still a minor when his father died in 1226, his brother Nicholas I acted as regent until 1234. During this period, Mecklenburg again became a fief of the Duchy of Saxony. In 1234, the brothers divided Mecklenburg among themselves; Hernry Borwin III received the Lordship of Rostock.

Henry Borwin III came into conflict with the emerging Hanseatic cities of Rostock and Wismar. He also waged war on his brothers. After the overthrow of Pribislaw I, Henry Borwin gained control of a part of Parchim-Richenberg.

During a war against Pomerania, he conquered Circipania, including the cities of Gnoien and Kalen, in 1236. He assisted Denmark in the war against Holstein.

Henry Borwin III died in 1278 and was buried in Doberan.

== Marriage and issue ==
In 1237, he married Sophia of Sweden (died before 24 June 1241), the daughter of King Eric X of Sweden. They had four children:

- John (died before 27 October 1266), co-regent with his father from 1262
- Waldemar, lord of Rostock (1278-1282)
- Henry, died young
- Eric, also died young

== Sources ==
- Wigger, Friedrich (1885). "Stammtafeln des Großherzoglichen Hauses von Meklenburg". Jahrbücher des Vereins für Mecklenburgische Geschichte und Altertumskunde. 50: 111–326.

Henry Borwin III of Rostock House of Mecklenburg Born: c. 1220 Died: 1 August 1278
Preceded by Henry Borwin II as Lord of Mecklenburg	Lord of Rostock; 1226-1278	Succeeded by Waldemar
