= Pribislaw II =

- Died: After 21 June 1316
- Noble family: House of Mecklenburg
- Spouse: Catherine of Pomerania
- Father: Pribislaw I
- Mother: A daughter of Richard of Friesack

Pribislaw II (died: after 21 June 1316) was a prince from the Parchim-Richenberg line of the House of Mecklenburg. He was Lord of Białogard from 1270 until his death.

== Life ==
His father was Pribislaw I, who had lost control of Parchim-Richenberg, but was still Lord of Białogard. His mother was a daughter, whose given name is unknown, of Richard of Friesack.

He married, c. 1269, to Catherine (d. after 1 January 1312), a daughter of Mestwin II and Jutta of Brehna. They had two children:

- Mestwin, who died after 1 January 1312, but before his father
- Lukardis (died after 3 June 1362)

When his father died (c. 1276), Pribislaw II inherited the Lordship of Białogard. This was originally a Pomeranian fief. After the Peace of Vierraden, the Margraves of Brandenburg became liege lords of Białogard, as well as of the Lordships of Daber and Welschenburg, with which they also enfeoffed Pribislaw II. However, in 1288 Duke Bogislaw IV occupied the territories.

In 1289 Pribislaw II donated 200 hides of land to Bukow Abbey. In 1312, he mortgaged Lake Malsche near Starogard Gdański to the Teutonic Knights. In 1313, he fought in the Battle of Stralsund.

Pribislaw II died in 1316. With his death, the Parchim-Richenberg line of the House of Mecklenburg died out in the male line.
