= Henry Borwin I of Mecklenburg =

Lord of Mecklenburg

Henry Borwin I
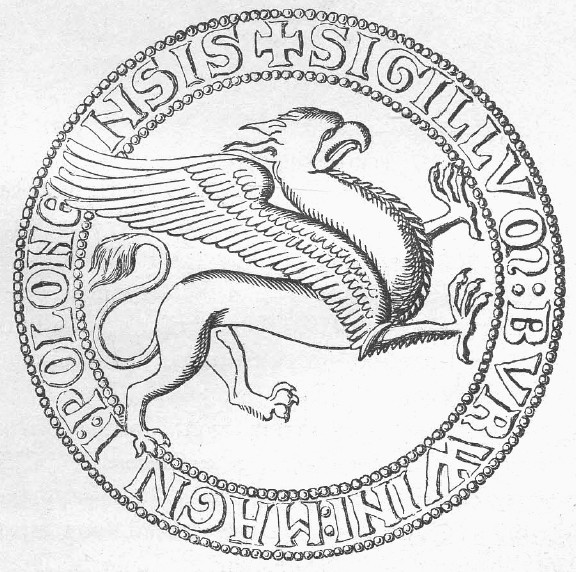
- Seal of Henry Borwin I

Lord of Mecklenburg
- Reign: 1178–1219
- Predecessor: Pribislav
- Successor: Henry Borwin II
- Died: 28 January 1227
- Noble family: House of Mecklenburg
- Spouses: Matilda of Saxony; Adelaide
- Issue: Nicholas II, Lord of Mecklenburg; Henry Borwin II, Lord of Mecklenburg; Elisabeth
- Father: Pribislav of Mecklenburg
- Mother: Woizlava of Pomerania

Henry Borwin I, Lord of Mecklenburg (died 28 January 1227), was the ruling Lord of Mecklenburg from 1178 until his death. Sometimes a Latinized version of his name is used ("Borwinus" or "Burwinus"); the form "Buruwe" is also found, as are "Henricus Buruwi", "Heinricus Buriwoi", and "Hinricus Burwy".

== Life ==
Henry Borwin I was a son of Pribislaw and his wife, Woizlava of Pomerania, daughter of Wartislaw I, Duke of Pomerania. Pribislav was an Obotrite prince and was the first Lord of Mecklenburg. He died on 30 December 1178 of a wound he received during a tournament at the court of Henry the Lion in Lüneburg, and Henry Borwin I succeeded him as Lord of Mecklenburg. Shortly before Pribislav's death, Henry Borwin I married Matilda, a daughter of Henry the Lion.

From 1183 to 1185, Henry Borwin I fought a war with his cousin Nicholas I. His father-in-law was unable to assist him during this war. This lack of outside assistance attracted the attention of King Canute VI of Denmark, who used the situation to expand his position on the Baltic Sea coast. The Danes took Henry Borwin I prisoner. He had to cede Rostock to Denmark and accept Canute VI as his liege lord. In 1200, Canute returned Rostock to him as a fief. In 1202, he fought on the Danish side in the Battle of Stellau. The Danes won, and Henry Borwin was rewarded with two more fiefs: Gadebusch and Ratzeburg.

In 1218 and 1219, he assisted in the Danish conquest of Estonia, and, from 1225 to 1227, he assisted them in a war against Schauenburg.

Henry Borwin I revived the cities of Rostock and Wismar and founded the abbeys of Dobbertin, Tempzin and Sonnenkamp.

== Marriage and issue ==
Henry Borwin I married twice. His first wife was Matilda, illegitimate daughter of Henry the Lion and Ida von Blieskastel. With her, he had two sons:

- Nicholas II, Lord of Mecklenburg (d. 1225)
- Henry Borwin II, Lord of Mecklenburg (d. 1226)

His second wife was Adelaide. With her, he had a daughter:

- Elisabeth of Mecklenburg (d. 1265), abbess of Wienhausen Abbey, from 1241.

Henry Borwin I of Mecklenburg House of Mecklenburg Died: 28 January 1227
Preceded by Pribislav	Lord of Mecklenburg; 1178–1219	Succeeded by Henry Borwin II
