= Pribislav of Mecklenburg =

First Prince of Mecklenburg from 1167 to 1178

- Mecklenburg coat of arms

Prince of Mecklenburg
- Reign: 1167–1178
- Predecessor: Niklot as Prince of the Obotrites
- Successor: Henry Borwin I as Lord of Mecklenburg; Nicholas I as Lord of Rostock
- Died: 30 December 1178; Lüneburg
- Buried: Doberan
- Noble family: House of Mecklenburg
- Spouse: Woizlava of Pomerania
- Issue: Henry Borwin I, Lord of Mecklenburg
- Father: Niklot

Pribislav (German: Pribislaw; died 30 December 1178) was an Obotrite prince and the first Prince of Mecklenburg (1167–1178).

== Life ==
Pribislav was one of three sons of the Obotrite chieftain Niklot, who was killed in 1160 during a joint campaign by Duke Henry the Lion of Saxony and King Valdemar the Great of Denmark. The territory of the Obotrites was largely partitioned between Saxon lords, but Pribislav continued to fight against Henry from the fortification at Werle on the River Warnow near Rostock, the only territory remaining to Pribislav and his brother Wertislav.

Niklot's sons engineered a widespread revolt against Saxon rule in 1163. While Wertislav and much of the Slavic nobility were imprisoned by Henry during the siege of Werle, Pribislav destroyed many of the former Obotrite castles including Mecklenburg where all the male Fleming (settlers from Flanders) defenders were slaughtered. After Pribislav recaptured Malchow and Quetzin, Henry the Lion suppressed the revolt with much bloodshed. Wertislav was publicly hanged at Malchow. Supported by a Danish fleet, the Saxon army defeated the Slavs in the bloody Battle of Verchen in 1164. Pribislav fled to Pomerania afterward, but later led raids into the counties of Schwerin and Ratzeburg.

The Cistercian missionary Berno of Amelungsborn convinced Pribislav to side with the Christians against the pagan Slavs. In conflict with the Saxon nobility and seeking an ally, Henry restored Pribislav to power in 1167 as the Prince of Mecklenburg, Kessin, and Rostock; the County of Schwerin remained in Frankish Saxon control. Pribislav's restoration to power established an originally Slavic dynasty in Mecklenburg that lasted until 1918. In comparison, the lands of the Polabians and Wagrians to the west had been taken over by Saxon lords.

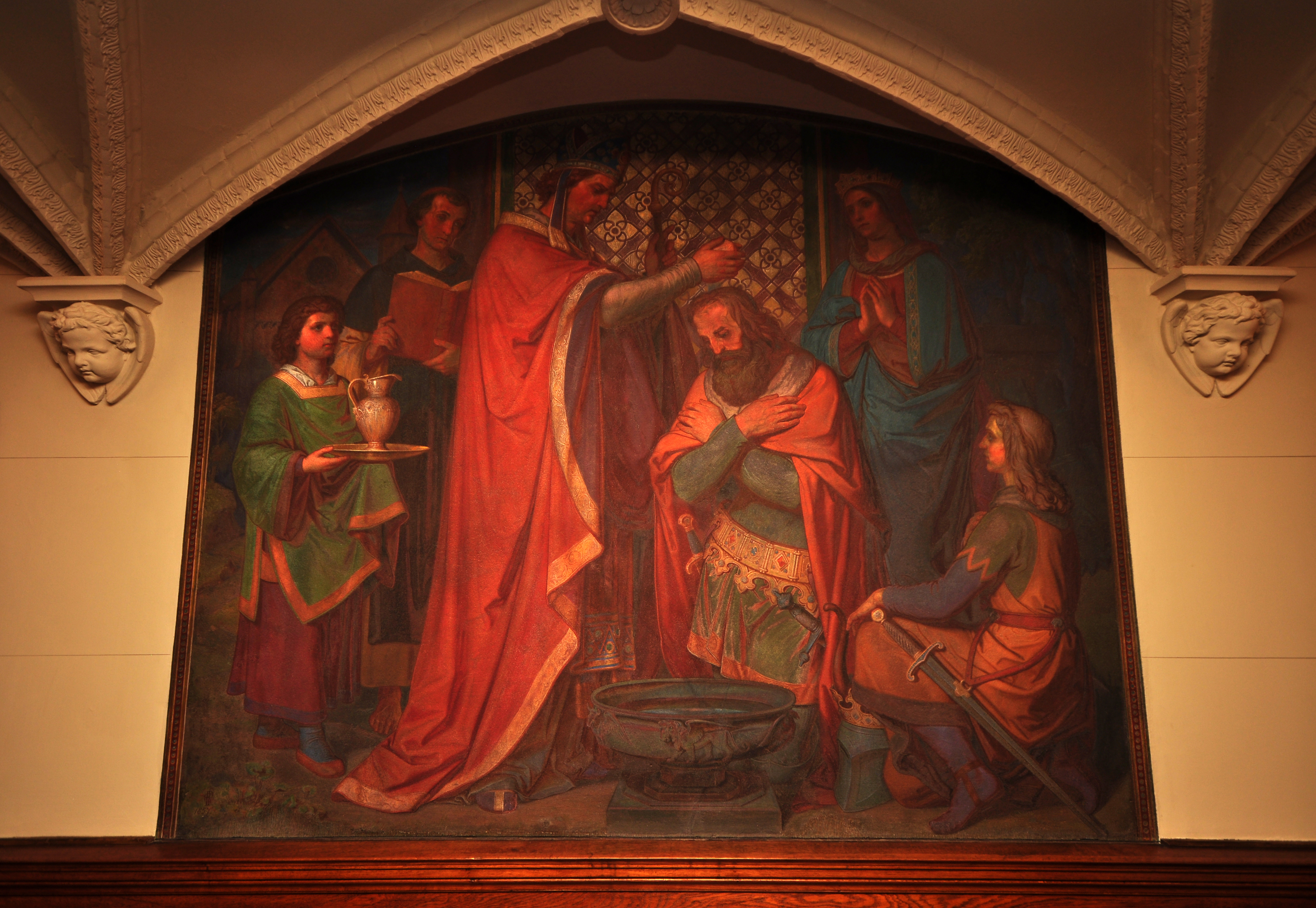
Karl Pfannschmidt: Baptism of Pribislaw (1855)

The date of Pribislav's conversion to Roman Catholic Christianity is disputed; it has been dated to before the death of Niklot in 1160 or to the prince's restoration to power in 1167. Allied with the Saxon duke, Pribislav fought against the pagan Rani of Rügen.

Pribislav founded the monastery of Doberan in 1171 and endowed the Bishopric of Schwerin. He participated in a pilgrimage to Jerusalem with Henry the following year. The prince also negotiated a marriage between his son Henry Borwin I and a daughter of Henry's.

He married Woizlava, daughter of Wartislaw I, Duke of Pomerania.

Pribislav died from a wound received at a tournament in Lüneburg on 30 December 1178, and his body was interred in St. Michaelis Church, Lüneburg. In 1219 his remains were transferred by his son Heinrich Borwin to the newly completed Doberan Minster, where they lie in a sarcophagus in the Chapel of Pribislav.

== Footnotes ==
Pribislav of Mecklenburg House of Mecklenburg Born: ? ? Died: 30 December 1178
Regnal titles
Preceded by Niklot as Prince of the Obotrites	Prince of Mecklenburg; 1167–1178	Succeeded by Henry Borwin I as Lord of Mecklenburg
Preceded by Niklot as Prince of the Obotrites	Prince of Mecklenburg; 1167–1178	Succeeded by Nicholas I as Lord of Rostock
