= Sternberg, Mecklenburg-Vorpommern =

Town in Mecklenburg-Vorpommern, Germany

Sternberg
- Town
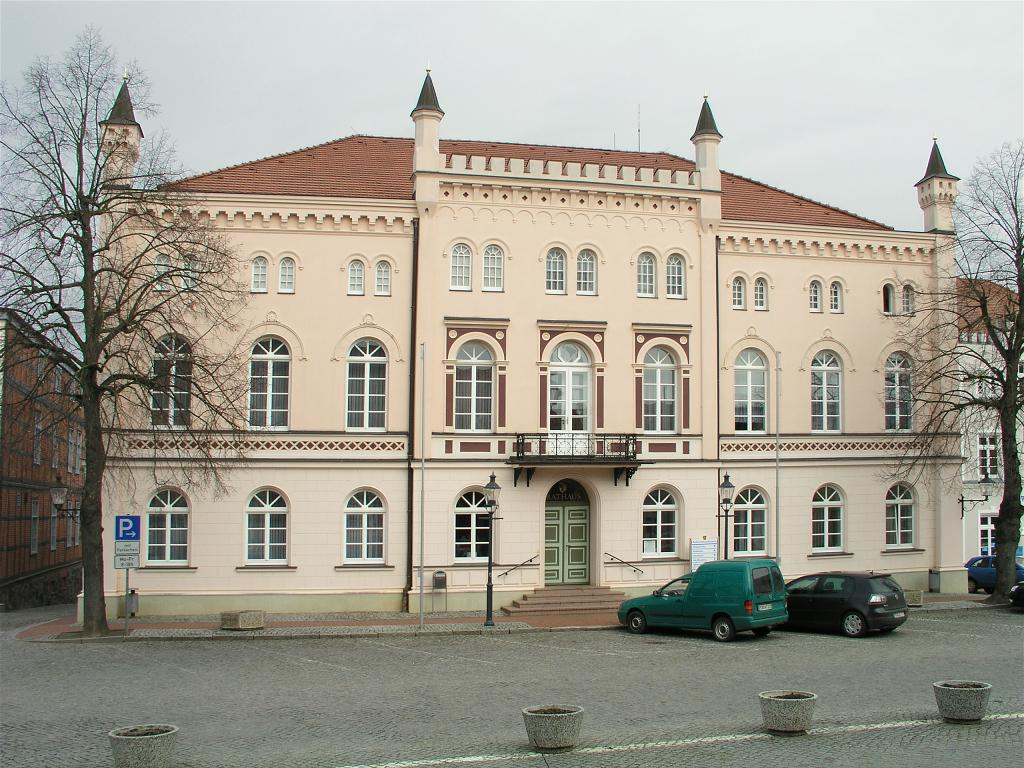
- Town hall

- Coat of arms

- Location of Sternberg within Ludwigslust-Parchim district
- Interactive map of Sternberg
- Location within Germany Location within Mecklenburg-Vorpommern
- Coordinates: 53°42′N 11°49′E
- Country: Germany
- State: Mecklenburg-Vorpommern
- District: Ludwigslust-Parchim
- Municipal assoc.: Sternberger Seenlandschaft

Government
  - Mayor: Jochen Quandt

Area
  - Total: 67.7 km^{2} (26.1 sq mi)
- Elevation: 40 m (130 ft)

Population (2025-12-31)
  - Total: 3,753
  - Density: 55.4/km^{2} (144/sq mi)
- Time zone: UTC+01:00 (CET)
  - Summer (DST): UTC+02:00 (CEST)
- Postal codes: 19406
- Dialling codes: 03847
- Vehicle registration: PCH
- Website: www.stadt-sternberg.de/

Sternberg (German pronunciation: [ˈʃtɛʁnbɛʁk]) is a town in the Ludwigslust-Parchim district of the state of Mecklenburg-Vorpommern.

== History ==
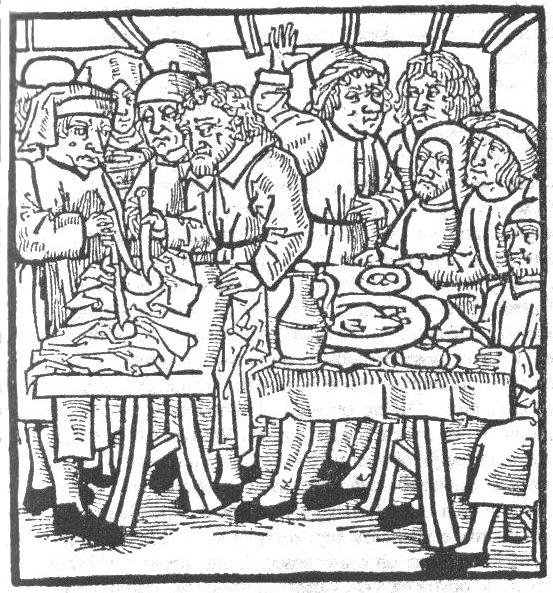
Image of Sternberg Jews carrying out host desecration

The town of Sternberg was founded during the Ostsiedlung by duke Pribislaw I, who chartered the town with German town law in 1248. In the vicinity of the town are the remains of three earlier, Slavic settlements (near Groß Raden and Sternberger Burg within the current city limits, and near Groß Görnow). The Slavic settlement and ramparts near Groß Raden have been excavated and reconstructed and serve as a well-known open-air museum for the Slavic era.

Suzerainty over Sternberg was transferred from Pribislaw to the Prince of Mecklenburg following Pribislaw's expulsion in 1255. Sternberg became the favorite residence of duke Heinrich II. (the Lion) in 1310. In 1492, 27 Jews were burned on the Judenberg after being charged with Eucharistic Sacrilege, a fictitious crime used in Jewish pogroms throughout medieval and renaissance Europe. On June 20, 1549, the Reformation was introduced in Mecklenburg as a result of a special council (Landtag) on the Sagsdorfer Bridge in Sternberg. In 1628, during the Thirty Years' War Albrecht von Wallenstein held council here.

== Geography ==
The city is located southwest of Rostock, southeast of Wismar, and northeast of Schwerin. It is located near the Warnow River.

== People ==
- Albrecht Tischbein (1803-1881), German shipbuilder
- Alexander Behm (1880-1952), German inventor and physicist
