= Pribislaw I =

Pribislaw I, Lord of Parchim-Richenberg
- Born: between 15 February and 3 June 1224
- Died: after 12 February 1275; Białogard
- Noble family: Obodrites
- Father: Henry Borwin II, Lord of Mecklenburg

Pribislaw I, Lord of Parchim-Richenberg (between 15 February and 3 June 1224 – after 12 February 1275), was Lord of Parchim-Richenberg from 1238 to 1256.

He was the youngest son of Prince Henry Borwin II, Lord of Mecklenburg. When his father died, Pribislaw and his three brothers divided Mecklenburg; Pribislaw received the Lordship of Parchim-Richberg. As he was still a minor, his brother John I acted as his guardian and regent until 1238, and he was raised at John I's court.

He came of age in 1238 and moved into Parchim Castle. His Lordship included the dominions of Parchim (including Brenz and Rosengarten) and Ture, the bailiwicks of Plau, Goldberg, Sternberg and Richenberg (near Langen Brütz on the river Warnow). He soon came into a border dispute with the Count of Schwerin, who forced him to hand over Brenz and Neustadt-Glewe.

After this feud, he managed to stabilize the economy of his territory by founding the cities of Goldberg and Sternberg and stimulating Jews to settle in Parchim. In 1248, he granted city rights to Goldberg and Sternberg. In 1240, he founded Parchimer Neustadt on the west bank of the Elde. In 1246, he brought members of the Franciscan Order into Parchim. In 1248, he moved his residence to the newly constructed Richenberg Castle, on the Warnow near the village of Kritzow.

Pribislaw twice came into a dispute with Bishop Rudolph I of Schwerin, once about the payment of tithes and once when Rudolph constructed a castle too close to the border, in Bützow. Pribislaw felt threatened by the caste. He burned it down and took Rudolph prisoner and locked him up in the dungeon of Richenberg Castle. He demanded a modest ransom, which the bishopric soon paid. Rudolph was released and then tried every means to overthrow Pribislaw. Pribislaw was outlawed and excommunicated. In 1255, Pribislaw was taken prisoner and handed over to Rudolph. His was removed from power and his territory was divided among his brothers and his brother-in-law, the Count of Schwerin. Pribislaw went into exile in Pomerania, where he received the Lordship of Białogard as compensation. When Rudolph died in 1262, Pribislaw hoped that he would be reinstated, but his brothers refused this.

In 1270, Pribislaw renounced his claims to Parchim-Richenberg and returned to Białogard, where he died after 12 February 1275

== Marriages and issue ==
Pribislaw married twice. His first wife was a daughter of Richard of Friesack; his second wife was probably a daughter of Duke Barnim I of Pomerania. He had a daughter and a son, Pribislaw II, who was Lord of Białogard from 1270 to 1316.
