= Gnoien =

Town in Mecklenburg-Vorpommern, Germany

- Town
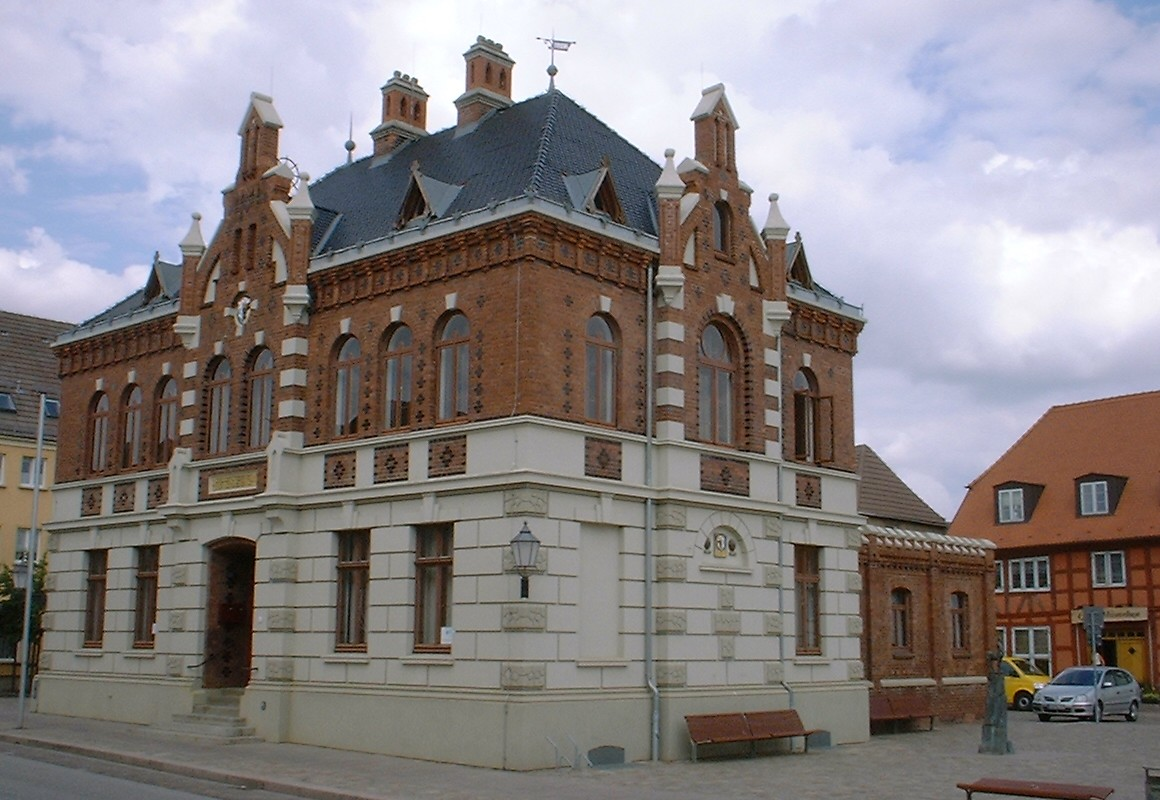
- Town hall

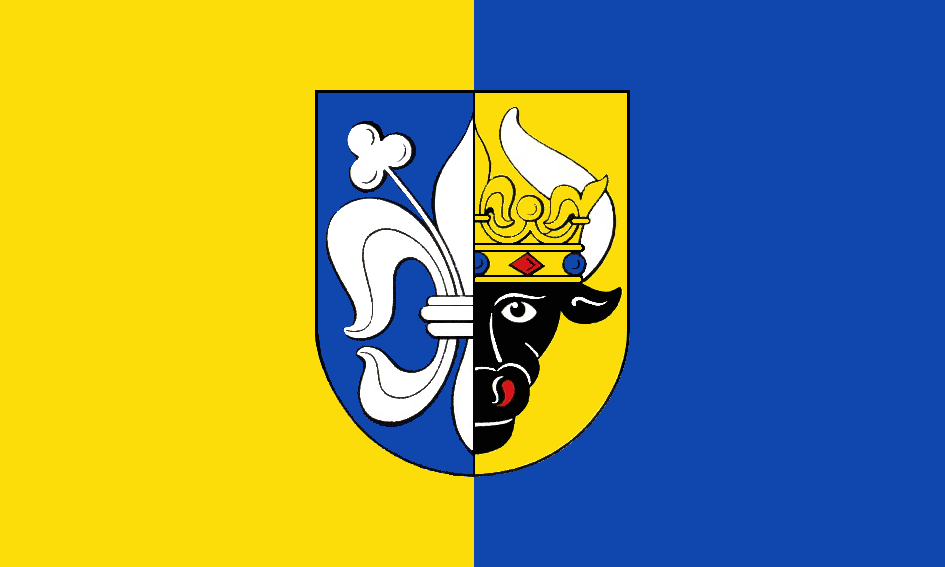
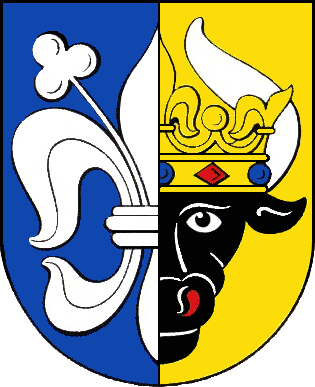
- Flag Coat of arms

- Location of Gnoien within Rostock district
- Interactive map of Gnoien
- Location within Germany Location within Mecklenburg-Vorpommern
- Coordinates: 53°58′N 12°43′E
- Country: Germany
- State: Mecklenburg-Vorpommern
- District: Rostock
- Municipal assoc.: Gnoien

Government
  - Mayor: Lars Schwarz

Area
  - Total: 41.11 km^{2} (15.87 sq mi)
- Elevation: 21 m (69 ft)

Population (2025-12-31)
  - Total: 2,670
  - Density: 64.9/km^{2} (168/sq mi)
- Time zone: UTC+01:00 (CET)
  - Summer (DST): UTC+02:00 (CEST)
- Postal codes: 17179
- Dialling codes: 039971
- Vehicle registration: LRO
- Website: http://www.stadt-gnoien.de/

Gnoien (German pronunciation: [ˈɡnɔʏən]) is a small town in the Rostock district, in Mecklenburg-Western Pomerania, Germany. It is situated 40 km southeast of Rostock.

== Famous people ==
- Bernd Olbricht (born 1956), canoeist.

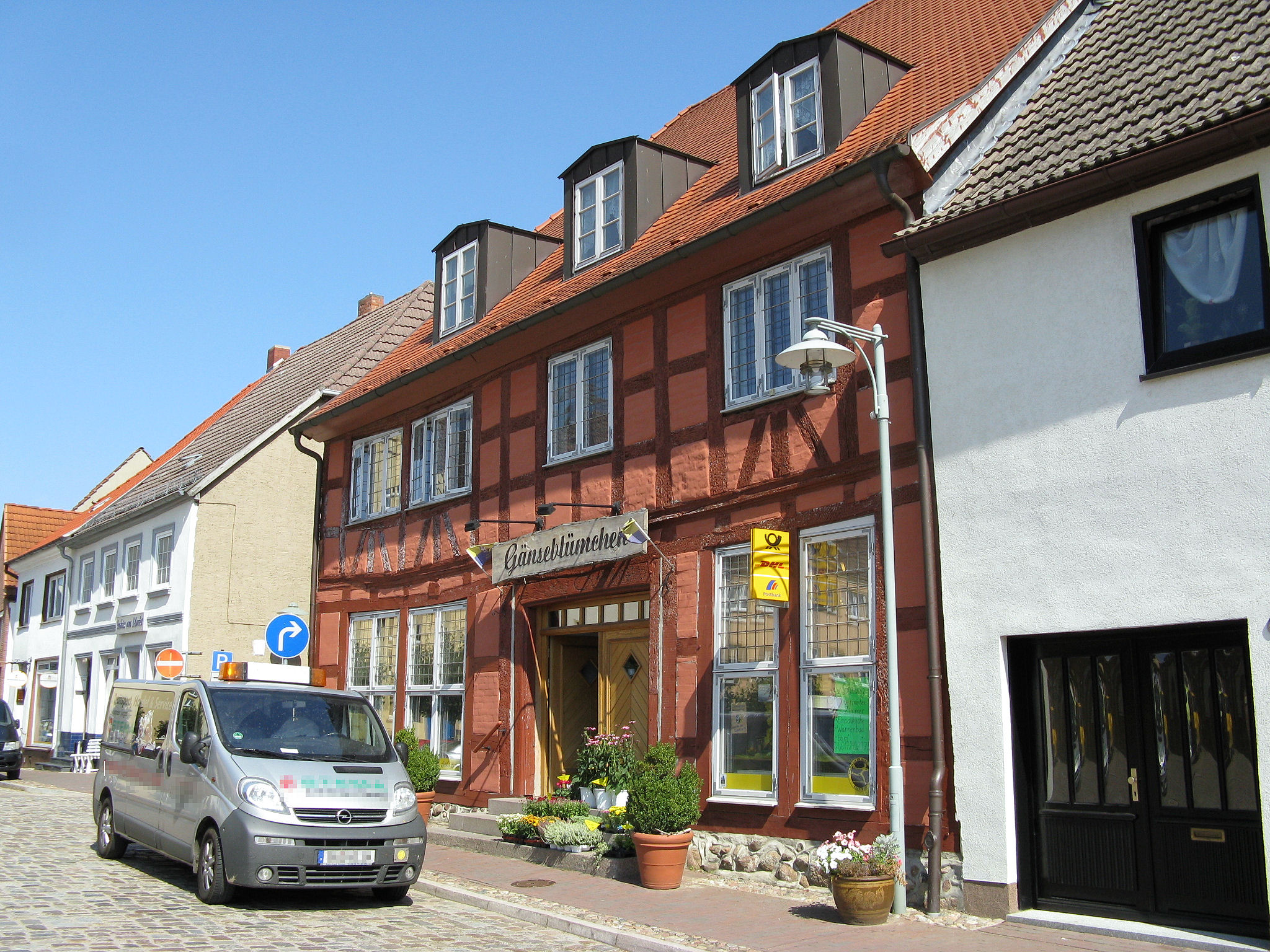
Gnoien

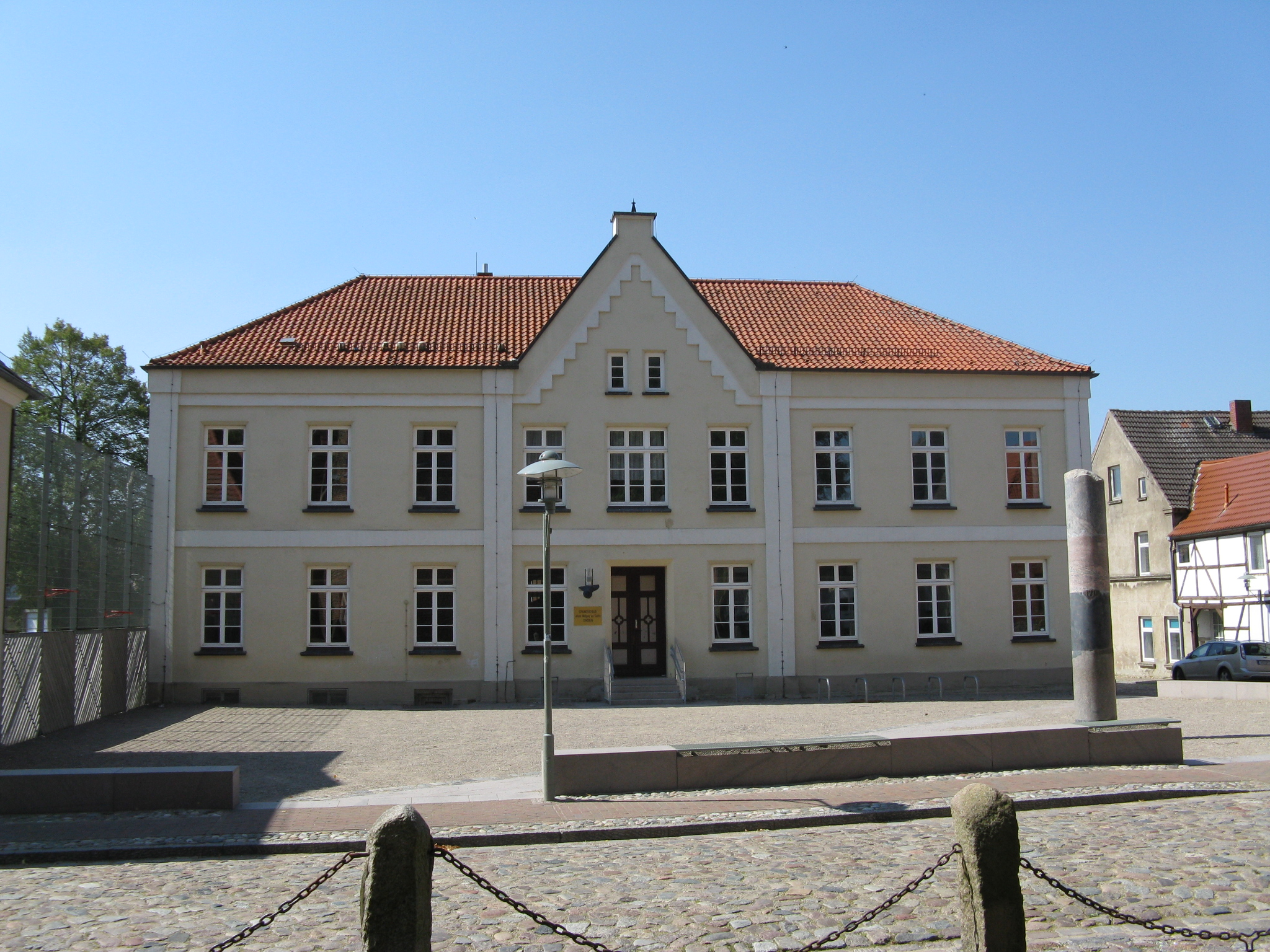
Elementary school Johann Wolfgang von Goethe

- Friedrich Heyser (1857 - 1921), German portrait, landscape, and history painter.
