= Joachim Richborn =

German organ builder (died 1684)

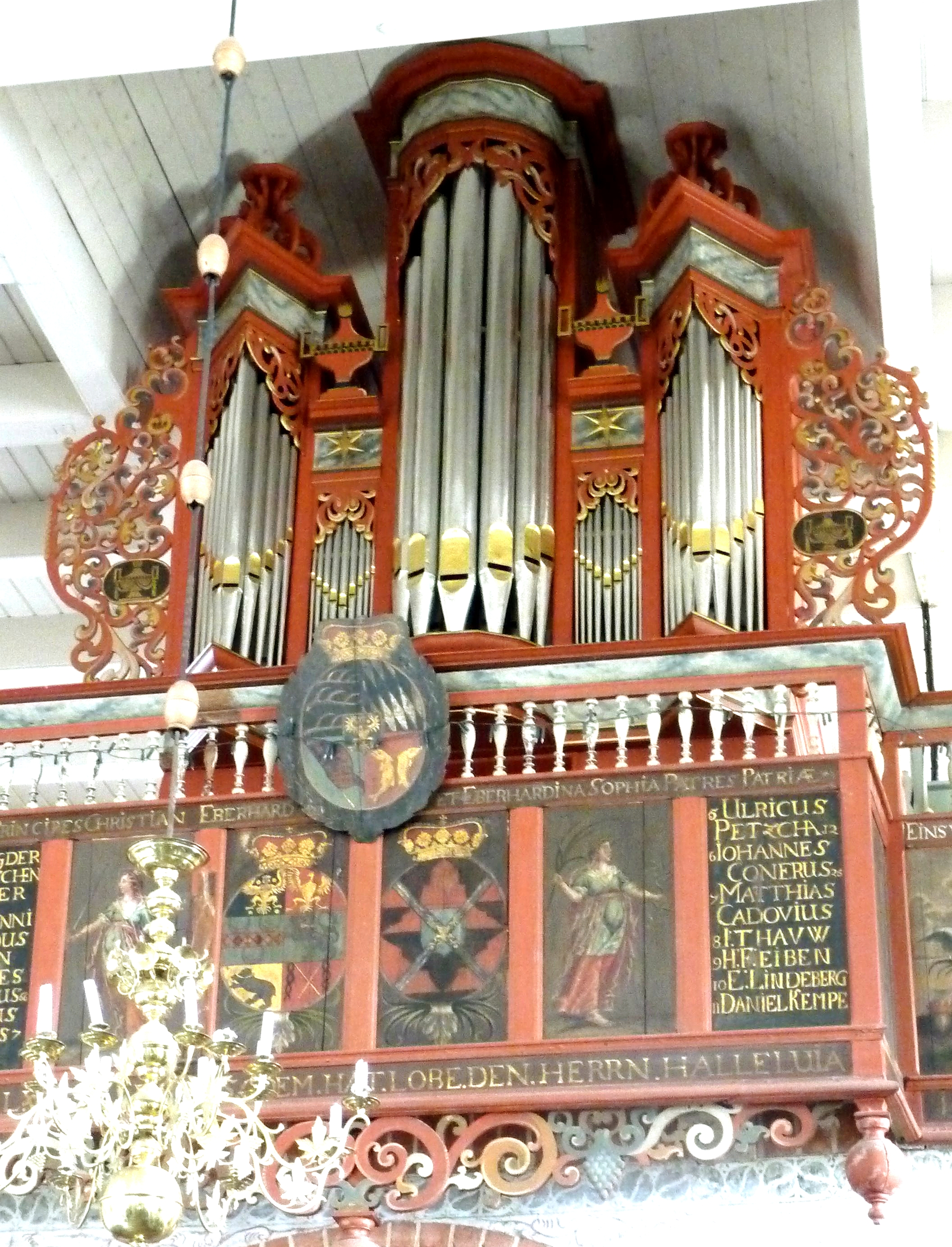
Organ in Buttforde, 1681

Joachim Richborn (died 1684) was a German organ builder, active in north Germany and Scandinavia during the second half of the 17th century. He was one of the most influential organ builders in Hamburg before and during the career of Arp Schnitger.

== Life ==
Joachim Richborn came from Hamburg and was possibly a pupil of the organ builder Friederich Stellwagen. In 1676 he was involved in the repair of the organ in the convent church of Mary Magdalene (Hamburg), and he also carried out work in Møgeltønder, Denmark.

Richborn's first major new-build was the organ of the first church to be built on the site of the present Lutheran church of St. Michael in Neustadt, Hamburg. During the first years of his independent career, he is often found associated with Matthias Weckmann, who was organist of St. James' Church, Hamburg between 1655 and 1674. Weckmann was also a god-parent to members of Richborn's family.

In 1673 Richborn carried out major alterations to the large organ of St. Mary's Church, Lübeck for Dieterich Buxtehude, and the following year to the large organ of St. Catherine's Church, Hamburg, for Buxtehude's friend Johann Adam Reincken. Between 1671 and 1673 Richborn made substantial enlargements to the organ of St James' Church, Lübeck, extending it to 51 stops and three manuals; some of his registers remain today. Letters written in chalk on the pipework of this organ, to indicate the pitch of the pipes, match writing found in the case of the former rood-screen organ, indicating that this smaller organ was also Richborn's work. The rood-screen organ was reconstructed by Mads Kjersgaard in 2003, based on the preserved positive organ at the convent church of Skokloster, Sweden.

Richborn built organs around the North Sea and Baltic East coast regions of Germany from East Frisia through North Frisia as far as Mecklenburg-Vorpommern and Scandinavia. Only two instruments in Germany and one in Sweden have survived the intervening centuries substantially intact, including the important and almost completely original organ at Buttforde, Wittmund, from 1681. Pipes from this organ were used as models by the Dutch organ builder Winold van der Putten for ranks in the great (Hauptwerk) and pedal divisions of his 2001-2002 organ in the Waller Kirche, Bremen.

In 1794 a small Richborn organ of 1684 was moved from the chapel of the castle of Bützow to the parish church of Ruchow, where it was set up by Heinrich Schmidt of the monastery of Dobbertin in 1796. The move cost 150 Reichstalers and was funded by princess Juliane of Schaumburg-Lippe. The organ was later rebuilt. It resurfaced in 2012, when it was found in Malchow Abbey by Friedrich Drese, the director of the Meklenburg organ museum. The organ was restored by Jehmlich Orgelbau Dresden and inaugurated on 4 June 2016. It is the oldest remaining positive organ in Mecklenburg-Vorpommern.

In 1684 Richborn began a new organ for St Nicholas church Elmshorn (a town 30km north of Hamburg), but he died before finishing the work; the organ was completed by Arp Schnitger. Richborn's son Otto Diedrich Richborn was also an organ builder, continuing in the tradition of Schnitger.

== Organs on which Richborn worked ==
The roman numerals indicate the number of manuals. An uppercase "P" indicates an independent pedal organ with its own sounding stops, while a lowercase "p" indicates a pull-down pedal linked to the keyboards, merely allowing the player to play manual keyboard notes with their feet. The Arabic numerals indicate the number of sounding registers (i.e. stop-knobs excluding accessories such as tremulants and couplers). Organs listed in italics are no longer extant.

Organs built by Richborn

Year	Location	Church	Image	Manuals	Registers	Comments
1664	Pakens, in Jeverland	Church of the Holy Cross, Pakens		I/p	8	Casework and pipes in some registers remain; enlarged by Alfred Führer in 1951-1960 (II/P/15)
1667	?			II	9	Origin unknown, but ascribed to Richborn based on similarity to the Lübecker Positiv (1673). Given to Skokloster church (a former convent church near Skokloster Castle) by Carl Gustaf Wrangel in 1674. Moved to Häggeby in 1804, then Kalmar in 1843, and rehoused in Skokloster since 1931. It was restored and reconstructed by Mads Kjersgaard in 1964, some original parts remaining.
approx. 1670	Hamburg	St. Michael's Church		II/P	20	His first large project, with approval by Matthias Weckmann and the organist of the church, Frank Dietrich Knoop (died 1679). The organ was replaced between 1712 and 1714 by a new organ (III/P 52) by Arp Schnitger, which was itself destroyed by fire in 1750.
1673	Lübeck	St James' Church, Lübeck		I	8	Originally a rood-screen organ, whose pipework and mechanism were destroyed along with the rood-screen itself in 1844. The casework survived, serving as a cupboard, until 2003 when it was reconstructed to a working organ by Mads Kjersgaard.
1674	Grevesmühlen	St Nikolai's church, Grevesmühlen		I/P	12	no longer exists
1684	Ruchow, in Mustin	Village church, Ruchow		I	5	A positive organ played while standing, of similar construction to an organ in La Laguna, Tenerife. Built in 1684 according to an inscription in the bellows, first recorded in use in the chapel of Bützow Castle in 1770, then moved to Ruchow by Heinrich Schmidt in 1796. Schmidt integrated the organ into a larger instrument, parts of the original being lost. In 2012 the organ was recognised as Richborn's work by comparison to the Lübeck and Skokloster organs. Restored to what is assumed to be its original state by Jehmlich Orgelbau Dresden in 2015.
1677	Berdum, a suburb of Wittmund	Church of Mary Magdalene, Berdum		I	6	Sold to Grimersum in 1789 and later replaced
1679	Møgeltønder, Denmark	Møgeltønder church		I	9	Modified in 1906 by Marcussen & Søn; in 1957 Rudolf von Beckerath added a Rückpositiv. The organ is reckoned to be the oldest complete church organ in Denmark. The church formerly served as the chapel for Schackenborg Castle
1680	Norrköping, Sweden	Hedvigs kyrka (German church)			18	Burnt down along with the church in 1719
1680s	La Laguna, Tenerife	Convento de St. Catalina		I	5	Sold to Tenerife in 1725 by Rudolff Meyer, who passed it off as his own work
1681	Buttforde, a suburb of Wittmund	Lutheran church of St Mary		I/p	9	A positive organ, almost completely intact
1682	Barmstedt, in the region of Pinneberg	Church of the Holy Ghost (Barmstedt)		II	9	Sold when the church was rebuilt in 1718
1681–1683	Tönning	Lutheran Church of St Laurentius		II/P	30	replaced in 1739; casework remains
1683	Moorfleet (Hamburg)	Church of St Nikolai		II/P		The façade remains
1684	Elmshorn	Church of St Nikolai (Elmshorn)		II/P	23	Richborn died before completing the organ; it was finished by Arp Schnitger. The casework and façade remain.

Other works

Year	Location	Church	Image	Manuals	Registers	Comments
1662–1663	Steinbek	Church				Restoration of the damaged organ; the work was approved by Matthias Weckmann Steinbek was the former name of a part of Billstedt, a district within Hamburg.
1667–1668	Altenbruch, a suburb of Cuxhaven	Lutheran Church of St Nicolai		II/P	25	Repairs; Richborn was recommended to the parish by Matthias Weckmann. Modern disposition III/P/35
1668	Groden, a suburb of Cuxhaven	St. Abundus				Repairs
1671	Hamburg	Orphanage				Rebuild of Positiv
1671	Uetersen					Rebuild; no longer extant
1671–1673	Lübeck	St James' Church		III/P	51	Major enlargement of the large organ; some of Richborn's ranks survive.
1673	Lübeck	St. Mary's Church				A rebuild of the large organ, carried out for Dietrich Buxtehude
1676–1677	Hamburg	St. Maria Magdalena				Repairs
1664–1682	Hamburg	St. Catherine's Church		IV/P	58	Enlargement and repairs, several new registers, including a 32' principal for the pedal; some pipework preserved.

== Bibliography ==
- Binz, Christian (2022). "A Nollet organ for the Benedictine Abbey of Eibingen. Organ building at the Rhein-Nahe-Eck around 1724". Acta Organologica. 37: 9–46.
- Hahn, Andreas (2022). "The Richborn positive in Ruchow. History – Restoration". Acta Organologica. 37: 47–86.
- Vogel, Harald; Lade, Günter; Borger-Keweloh, Nicola (1997). Orgeln in Niedersachsen. Bremen: Hauschild. ISBN 3931785505.
- Vogel, Harald; Ruge, Reinhard; Noah, Robert; Stromann, Martin (1997). Orgellandschaft Ostfriesland (2 ed.). Norden: Soltau-Kurier-Norden. ISBN 3928327194.
- Kaufmann, Walter (1968). Die Orgeln Ostfrieslands – Orgeltopographie. Aurich: Verlag Ostfriesische Landschaft.
- Fock, Gustav (1939). "Hamburgs Anteil am Orgelbau im niederdeutschen Kulturgebiet". Zeitschrift des Vereins für Hamburgische Geschichte. 38: 289–373. For Richborn see pages 361-364
