= Diocese and prince-bishopric of Schwerin =

Catholic diocese in Mecklenburg, Germany

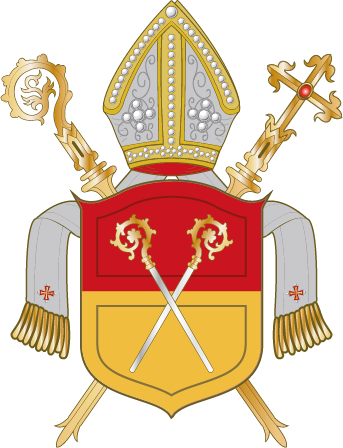
Coat-of-arms of the Prince-Bishopric of Schwerin

The Diocese and Prince-bishopric of Schwerin was a Catholic diocese in Schwerin, Mecklenburg, in Germany. The first registered bishop was ordained in the diocese in 1053, and the diocese ceased to exist in 1994.

== Pre-Reformation Catholic (prince-)bishopric ==
The bishops of the Roman Catholic diocese of Schwerin (German: Bistum Schwerin), a suffragan of the Metropolitan Archdiocese of Bremen, were simultaneously secular (political) rulers of princely rank (prince-bishop) in the Prince-Bishopric of Schwerin (Hochstift Schwerin); established 1180 and secularised in 1648), an imperially immediate state of the Holy Roman Empire. Schwerin was the seat of the chapter, Schwerin Cathedral and residence of the bishops until 1239. In 1180 a prince-episcopal residence was established in Bützow, which became the main residence in 1239.

=== Titulature of the Schwerin bishops ===
Not all incumbents of the Schwerin see were imperially invested with princely temporal power as Prince-Bishops and not all were papally confirmed as bishops. In 1180 part of the Schwerin diocesan territory was disentangled from the Duchy of Saxony and became an own territory of imperial immediacy called Prince-Bishopric of Schwerin, an imperially immediate feudal member state of the Holy Roman Empire like many prince-prelatures.

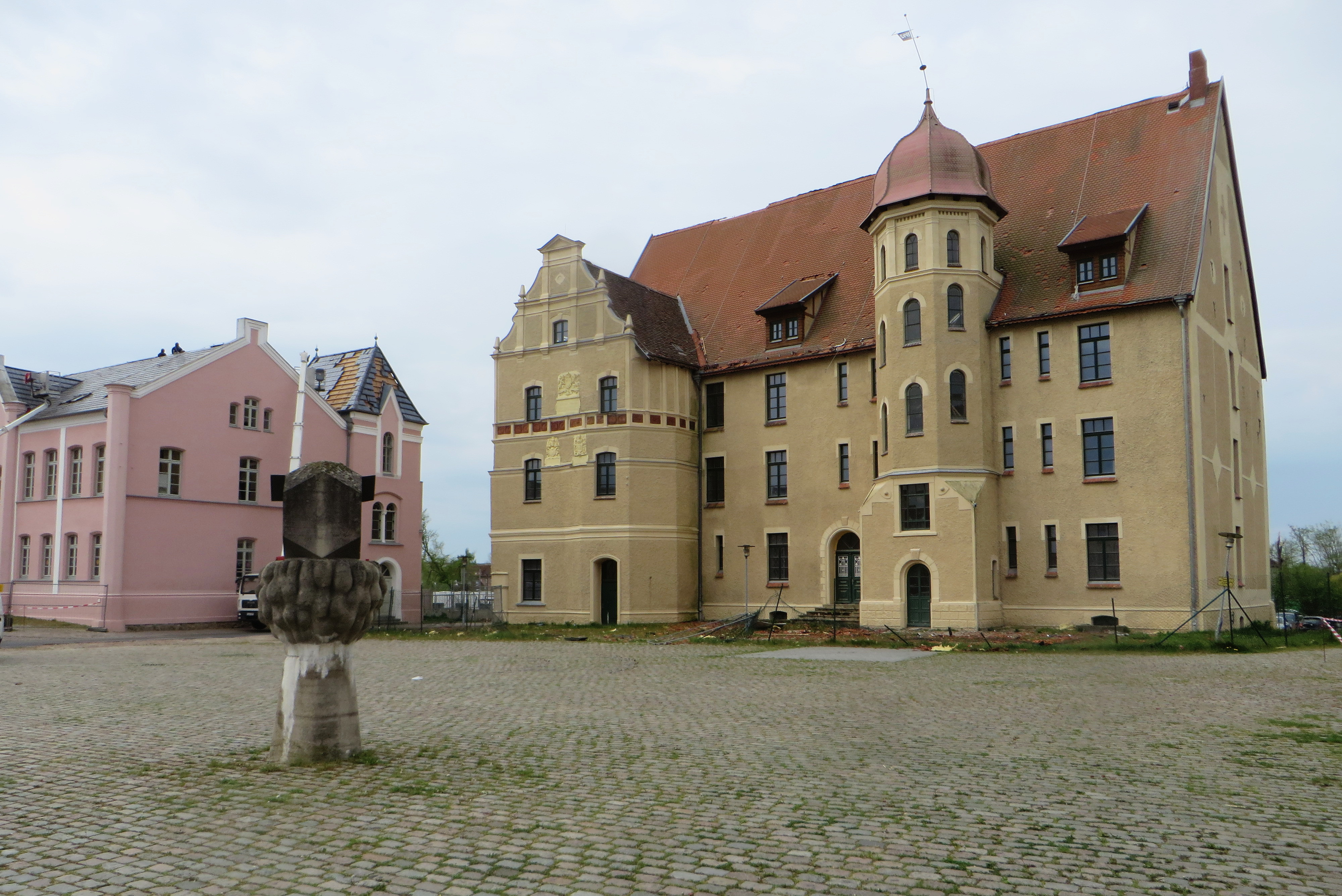
Bützow Castle, prince-episcopal residential castle in Bützow

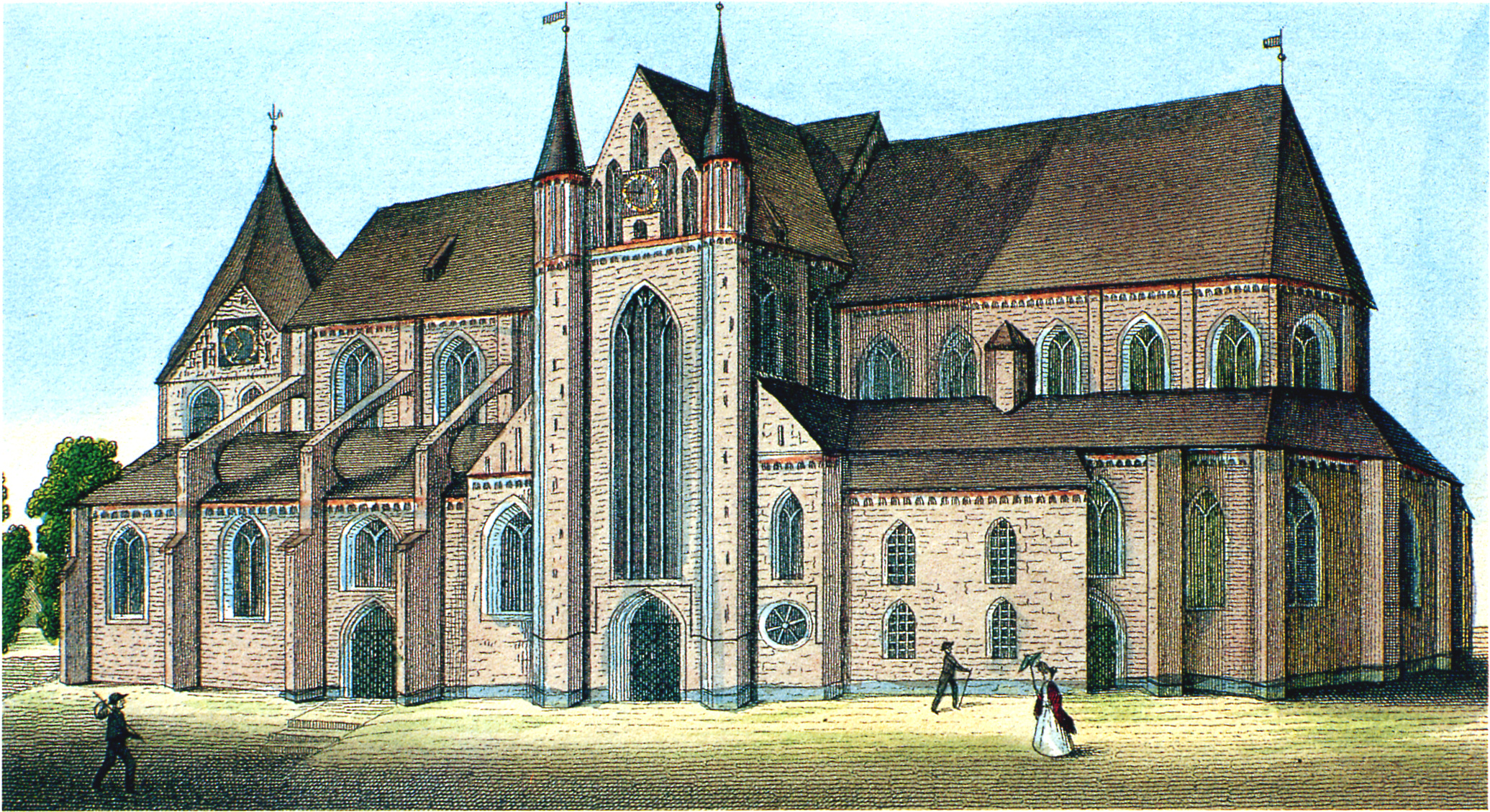
Cathedral of SS. Mary and John the Baptist, church of the bishops in Schwerin, view before 1845.

The prince-bishopric was an elective monarchy, with the ruling prince being the respective bishop usually elected by the Cathedral chapter, and confirmed by the Holy See, or exceptionally only appointed by the Holy See. Papally confirmed bishops were then invested by the emperor with the princely regalia, thus the title prince-bishop. However, sometimes the respective incumbent of the see never gained a papal confirmation, but was still invested the princely regalia. Also the opposite occurred with a papally confirmed bishop, never invested as prince. A number of incumbents, elected by the chapter, neither achieved papal confirmation nor imperial investiture, but as a matter of fact nevertheless de facto held the princely power. From 1532 to 1648 all incumbents were Lutherans.

The respective incumbents of the see bore the following titles:

- Bishop of Mecklenburg until 1162
- Bishop of Schwerin 1162 to 1181
- Prince-Bishop of Schwerin from 1181 to 1516, except o the years of 1474 to 1479 and 1506 to 1508
- Administrator of the Prince-Bishopric of Schwerin 1474 to 1479, 1506 to 1508, and again 1516 to 1648. Either simply de facto replacing the Prince-Bishop or lacking canon-law prerequisites the incumbent of the see would officially only hold the title administrator (but nevertheless colloquially referred to as Prince-Bishop).

=== Catholic bishops of Mecklenburg and Schwerin (1053–1181) ===
Catholic Bishops of Mecklenburg and Schwerin (1053–1181)
Episcopate	Portrait	Name	Birth and death with places	Reason for end of office	Notes
1053–1066		John Scotus as John I	*approx. 990 – 10 November 1066*	death	martyr, sacrificed by pagans to Radegast
1066–1148		sede vacante			the diocese was abandoned after the Wendish uprising
1148–1162		Eberhard also: Emmehard			
1162–1191		Berno of Amelungsborn	*unknown – 14 January 1191*	death	Apostle of the Obotrites, gained princely power in part of his diocese by 1181 on the carve-up of Saxony

=== Catholic Prince-Bishops (1181–1474) ===
Roman Catholic Prince-Bishops of Schwerin (1181–1474)
Reign and episcopate	Portrait	Name	Birth and death with places	Reason for end of office	Notes
1162–1191		Berno of Amelungsborn	*unknown – 14 January 1191*	death	Apostle of the Obotrites, gained princely power in part of his diocese by 1181 on the carve-up of Saxony
1191–1238		Brunward			
1191–1195		Hermann of Hagen			anti-bishop
1238–1240		Frederick of Hagen as Frederick I			
1240–1247		Dietrich			
1247–1249		William			
1249–1262		Rudolph I	*unknown – 1262*	death	
1263–1291		Hermann of Schladen as Hermann I			
1292–1314	left image	Godfrey von Bülow as Godfrey I (Bülow family)	*unknown – 1314*	death	uncle of Henry I and Ludolph
1315–1322		Hermann von Maltzan as Hermann II			
1322–1331		Johann Gans zu Putlitz as John II (Gans zu Putlitz)			
1331–1339	left image	Ludolph von Bülow (Bülow family)	*before 1298 – 23 April 1339*, Warin	death	nephew of Godfrey I, brother of the next, uncle of Frederick II
1339–1347	right image	Henry von Bülow as Henry I (Bülow family)	*unknown – 1347*	death	brother of the former, nephew of Godfrey I, uncle of Frederick II
1347–1348		Willekin Pape			
1348–1356		Andrew of Wislica			
1356–1363		Albert of Sternberg; German: Albrecht	*c. 1333 – 14 January 1380*, Litomyšl	became Bishop of Litomyšl	also Bishop of Litomyšl (1364–1368, and again 1371–1380), Prince-Archbishop of Magdeburg (1368–1371)
1363–1365		Rudolph of Anhalt as: Rudolph II (House of Ascania)	*unknown – 1365*, Coswig in Anhalt	death	son of Albert II, Prince of Anhalt-Zerbst
1366–1377	right image	Frederick von Bülow as: Frederick II (Bülow family)	*unknown – 1366*	death	nephew of Ludolph and Henry I
1377–1381		Melchior of Brunswick and Lunenburg, Grubenhagen line (House of Welf)	*1341 – 6 June 1384*		before Prince-Bishop of Osnabrück (1369–1375); rivalled in Schwerin by anti-bishop Marquard in 1377/1378
1377–1378		Marquard Bermann			anti-bishop
1381–1390		John Potho of Pothenstein also: Pottenstein as John III	*unknown – 1390*	death	before Prince-Bishop of Münster (1379–1382) appointed only, de facto he could not prevail over his rivals in Schwerin
1381–1388		Johann Junge as John IV			anti-bishop
1381–?		Gerard of Hoya (Counts of Hoya)			anti-bishop
1390–1415		Rudolf of Mecklenburg-Stargard as: Rudolph III (House of Nikloting)	*unknown – 1415*	death	before Bishop of Skara (1387–1391), son of John I, Duke of Mecklenburg-Stargard
1416–1418		Henry of Nauen as Henry II			
1419–1429		Henry of Wangelin as Henry III			
1429–1444		Hermann Köppen as Hermann III	*unknown – 3 January 1444*	death	
1444–1457		Nicholas Bödeker as Nicholas I			
1458		Godfrey Lange as Godfrey II			
1458–1473		Werner Wolmers			

=== Catholic Administrators and Prince-bishops (1474–1532) ===
Catholic Administrators and Prince-Bishops (1474–1532)
Reign and episcopate	Portrait	Name	Birth and death with places	Reason for end of office	Notes
1474–1479		Balthasar of Mecklenburg (House of Nikloting)	*1451 – 16 March 1507*, Wismar	resigned tired from pursuing investiture, turned secular	before Administrator of the Prince-Bishopric of Hildesheim (1471–1474); only administrator, never invested bishop; since duke in Mecklenburg-Schwerin, co-ruling with his brother Magnus II
1479–1482		Nicholas of Pentz as Nicholas II			
1482–1503		Conrad Loste			
1504–1506		John Thun as John V			
1504		Reimar von Hahn (Hahn family)			anti-bishop
1506–1508		Ulrich von Malchow			only administrator, never invested as bishop
1508–1516		Petrus Wolkow			
1516–1522		Zutpheld Wardenberg			only administrator for the minor Magnus, also Dean (Domdechant) of Schwerin Cathedral
1522–1532		Heinrich Banzkow also: Banzcow or Bantzkow	*before 1499–1540*	resigned when Magnus came of age	only administrator for the minor Magnus, never pursued investiture as bishop; also provost of Hamburg Cathedral

Due to the Reformation, the Catholic diocese was suppressed in 1555, without a formal successor.

== Lutheran Schwerin ==
=== Lutheran Administrators of the Prince-Bishopric (1532–1648) ===
Lutheran Administrators of the Prince-Bishopric (1532–1648)
Reign and episcopate	Portrait	Name	Birth and death with places	Reason for end of office	Notes
1532–1550		Magnus of Mecklenburg (House of Nikloting)	Stargard, *4 July 1509 – 28 January 1550*, Bützow	death	bishop elect since 1516, due to minority only officiating since 1532 as administrator, due to lack of papal confirmation, Magnus introduced the Reformation in 1533
1550–1603		Ulrich of Mecklenburg as Ulrich I (House of Nikloting)	Schwerin, *5 March 1527 – 14 March 1603*, Güstrow	death	grandfather of the next; also Duke of Mecklenburg-Güstrow (1555–1603)
1603–1624		Ulrik of Denmark as Ulrich II (House of Oldenburg)	Koldinghus Palace, Kolding, *30 December 1578 – 27 March 1624*, Rühn	death	grandson of the former, uncle of the next; also Lutheran Bishop of Schleswig (1602–1624)
1624–1629		Ulrik of Denmark as Ulrich III (House of Oldenburg)	Frederiksborg Palace, Hillerød, *2 February 1611 - 12 August 1633*, Schweidnitz	resigned when his father Christian IV renounced posts held by his family in the Empire in 1629 (Treaty of Lübeck)	nephew of the former; since 1628 de facto deposed by Wallenstein's conquest of the prince-bishopric
1629–1634		sede vacante			territory of the Prince-Bishopric was part of Wallenstein's duchy of Mecklenburg
1634–1648		Adolf Frederick of Mecklenburg (House of Nikloting)	Schwerin, *15 December 1588 – 27 February 1658*, Schwerin	prince-bishopric transformed into principality by Peace of Westphalia	also Duke of Mecklenburg-Schwerin as Adolphus Frederick I (1592–1628, and again 1631–1658)
after 15 May 1648		The Prince-Bishopric was converted into a heritable monarchy, the Principality of Schwerin, ruled in personal union by the House of Nikloting in Mecklenburg-Schwerin.			

=== Lutheran Regional Bishops of Mecklenburg since 1921 ===
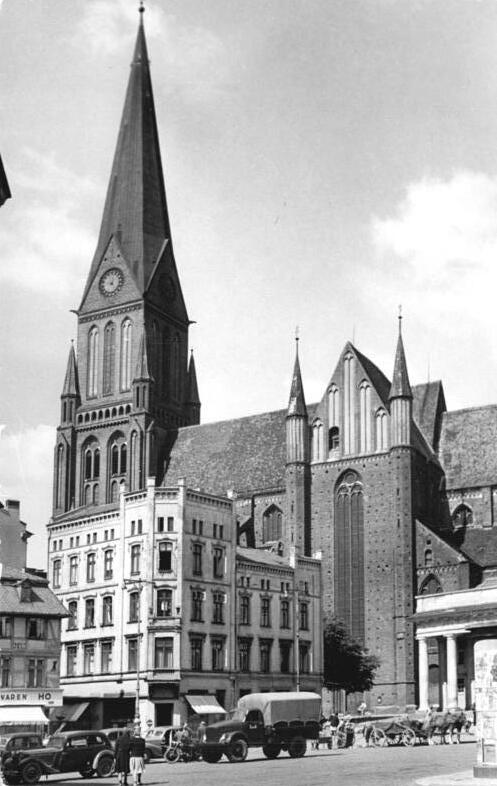
Cathedral of Ss. Mary and John the Baptist, Schwerin, preaching venue of the Landesbischof of Mecklenburg.

When the Grand dukes of Mecklenburg-Schwerin and Mecklenburg-Strelitz abdicated, the Lutheran state churches became independent and adapted their new Church Orders, providing for a function called Landesbischof (state bishop). In 1934 the regional churches merged into the Evangelical Lutheran Church of Mecklenburg.

- 1921–1933: Gerhard Tolzien (for the Church of Mecklenburg-Strelitz)
- 1921–1930: Heinrich Behm (for the Evangelical Lutheran Church of Mecklenburg-Schwerin)
- 1930–1934: Heinrich Rendtorff (for Mecklenburg-Schwerin, at last also leading the merged church body of all of Mecklenburg)
- 1934–1945: Walter Schultz
- 1946–1971: Niklot Beste
- 1971–1984: Heinrich Rathke
- 1984–1996: Christoph Stier
- 1996–2007: Hermann Beste
- 2007 to date: Andreas von Maltzahn, since the merger of 2012 for the Evangelical Lutheran Church in Northern Germany

== New Catholic hierarchy in Schwerin from the 20th century ==
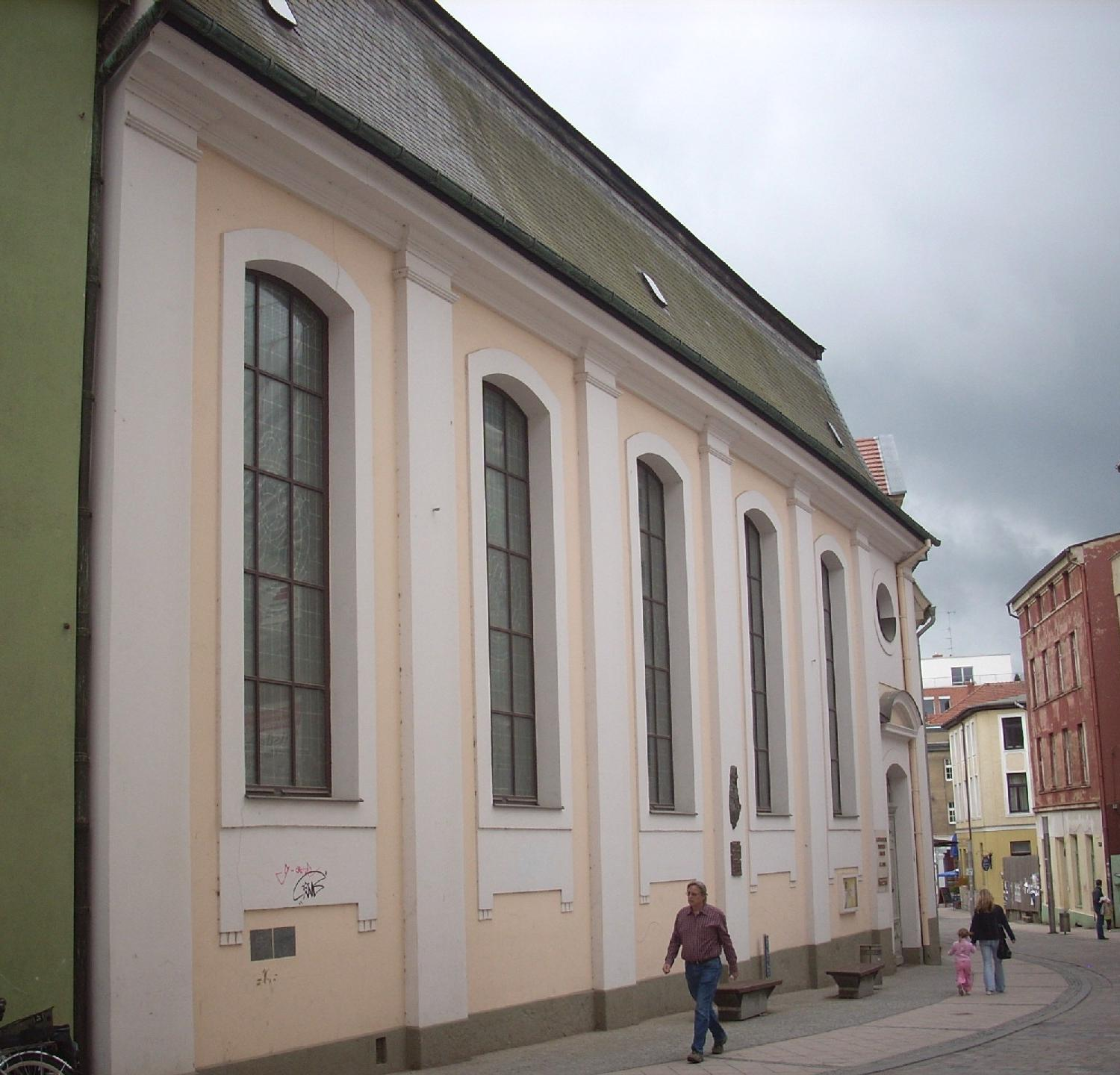
Provostry Church of St. Anna, seat of the auxiliary bishop of the Metropolitan Archdiocese of Hamburg in Schwerin.

After a century and a half of abandonment, the Catholics on the territory were merely taken care of as missionary, part of the vast Apostolic Vicariate of the Northern Missions of Northern Germany, the first post-Reformatory parish having been established in 1709 (St. Anna, Schwerin).

Since 1930, the Catholic parishes in the former diocese of Schwerin (and all of Mecklenburg) were part of the Roman Catholic Diocese of Osnabrück.

However, Mecklenburg Soviet occupation zone, whereas Osnabrück was in the British occupation zone (i.e. in the other half of partitioned Germany, and of the political world during the Cold War), so the Bishop of Osnabrück appointed an episcopal commissary. Since 1959, the Osnabrück diocese posted an auxiliary bishop in Schwerin, responsible for Mecklenburg's Catholic parishes :

- Bernhard Schräder, first 1946 – 1959 episcopal commissary for the episcopal commissariate of Schwerin, then 1959 – 1971 auxiliary bishop of Osnabrück diocese for the episcopal commissariate in Schwerin.
- 1971 – 1973 (see below): Heinrich Theissing, coadjutor of Osnabrück diocese for the episcopal commissariate in Schwerin

On July 23, 1974, the jurisdiction was restored as pre-diocesan 'permanent' Apostolic Administration of Schwerin, its territory being formally split off from the Diocese of Osnabrück. It got two episcopal incumbents :

- Heinrich Theissing, Apostolic Administrator (July 23, 1973– retired December 5, 1987) with episcopal rights of a residing bishop for the episcopal office in Schwerin; Titular Bishop of Mina (March 13, 1963 – death November 11, 1988), first as Auxiliary Bishop of the Roman Catholic Diocese of Berlin (March 13, 1963 – February 12, 1970), then as Coadjutor Bishop of Schwerin (February 12, 1970 – July 23, 1973), finally an emeritate
- Theodor Hubrich, Apostolic Administrator (1987.11.23 – death 1992.03.26) with episcopal rights of a residing bishop for the episcopal office in Schwerin; previously Titular Bishop of Auca (1975.12.05 – 1987.11.23) as Auxiliary Bishop of Magdeburg (Germany) (1975.12.05 – 1987.11.23).

The apostolic administration was suppressed on October 10, 1994, its territory reassigned to the already established Metropolitan Roman Catholic Archdiocese of Hamburg, thus the Catholic parishes of Mecklenburg became part of the new Roman Catholic Archdiocese of Hamburg.

- 1992–1994 Norbert Werbs, diocesan administrator for the episcopal office in Schwerin
- Since 1994 : Norbert Werbs, auxiliary bishop of the Archdiocese of Hamburg for the archiepiscopal office in Schwerin, also episcopal vicar for Mecklenburg

== See also ==
- List of Catholic dioceses in Germany

== Sources and external links ==
- Josef Traeger, Die Bischöfe des mittelalterlichen Bistums Schwerin, Leipzig: St.-Benno-Verlag, 1984. (in German)
- GCatholic - Diocese and Apostolic administration
