= Ulrik of Denmark =

Ulrik of Denmark may refer to:

- Ulrik of Denmark (1578–1624), son of King Frederick II of Denmark, Prince-Bishop of Schwerin
- Ulrik of Denmark (1611–1633), son of King Christian IV of Denmark, Prince-Bishop of Schwerin
