= Rudolf of Mecklenburg-Stargard =

- Died: 1415
- Noble family: House of Mecklenburg
- Father: John I, Duke of Mecklenburg-Stargard
- Mother: Agnes of Lindow-Ruppin

Rudolf of Mecklenburg-Stargard (died 1415) was a Roman Catholic bishop of Skara (Sweden) and Schwerin. He resided in Bützow.

Rudolf was the son of Duke John I, Duke of Mecklenburg-Stargard and his wife, Countess Agnes of Lindow-Ruppin. He was Bishop of Skara from 1386 to 1390 and then Bishop of Schwerin until his death.

In 1392, Rudolf was involved in the General Peace in Mecklenburg.

In 1407, he was instrumental in the Priest burning at Stralsund, as it was his task to pass judgement on the perpetrators. When the accused did not appear before his court, he pronounced an interdict over the mayor and the city council and the citizens of Stralsund. The interdict was lifted in 1416, after Rudolf's death, and after a large sum of money had been paid. Rudolf's successor used the money to decorate Schwerin Cathedral. A red inscription in the Cathedral reads Dith hebben de Sundeschen mothen buwen, datt se de papenn verbrannt haddenn ("The citizens of Stralsund had to build this, after they had burned the priests." or "This [cathedral nave] have the Stralsund citizens built, [in repentance] for having burned the priests.")

Rudolf of Mecklenburg-Stargard House of Mecklenburg Died: 1415
Catholic Church titles
Preceded by Nils	Bishop of Skara; 1386–1390	Succeeded by Torsten
Regnal titles
Catholic Church titles
Preceded by John III	Prince-Bishop of Schwerin as Rudolph III; 1390–1415	Succeeded by Henry II
