= John III Potho of Pothenstein =

14th-century German Catholic bishop

- See: Münster
- Appointed: 1379
- Term ended: 11 October 1382
- Other post: Bishop of Schwerin

Personal details
- Died: 1390

John III Potho of Pothenstein (also spelled Pottenstein; died 1390) was Bishop of Bishopric of Münster from 1379 to 1382. He was then officially appointed Bishop of Schwerin, however, he was never able to actually exercise power there.

== Life ==
Potho was a member of a Czech-speaking Bohemian noble family based at Pottenstein Castle (now Potštejn in the Czech Republic). They were possibly related to the Bavarian Counts Palatine. It is not known whether he spoke German himself.

In 1356, Potho was appointed canon of the cathedral in Olomouc. In 1371, he was mentioned as Archdeacon in Prague and papal chaplain. He originally supported the Popes in Avignon, however, after King Wenceslaus proposed him as the next Bishop of Münster, he changed sides and support Pope Urban VI in Rome.

En route to Münster, Potho and his entourage were attacked near Hamm by the Count of the Marck. He lost his valuables and barely managed to evade being taken prisoner. King Wenceslaus tried in vain to exert his influence to have the stolen money returned.

Immediately after Potho's arrival in Münster, he created several indulgences, with papal permission. He urged the faithful to try to acquire these. A diocesan synod was probably not held during his time in office. He was later described as greedy, however, contemporary documents suggest that he was genuinely interested in religious affairs.

On the other hand, Potho showed little interest in the castles in his territory. When he was short of money, he had to pledge Horstmar Castle to the Count of Hoya. He probably never signed a treaty with the Estates of his bishopric.

Potho took no notable initiatives for the temporal government of his bishopric. During his reign, Rheda was besieged by an alliance between Münster and several other bishops against the Counts of Tecklenburg, however, this alliance had already been created before his arrival. During his reign, a Public Peace was agreed, and a peace treaty was agreed with the counts of Tecklenburg. However, the dispute with Tecklenburg would erupt again shortly afterwards.

As Potho was unfamiliar with the political situation in his bishopric, the cathedral chapter tasked his provost Heidenreich Wolf of Lüdinghausen with the administration of the bishopric . It is not clear whether the chapter demanded his resignation. In any case, he realized that he was unable to fulfill his duties as prince-bishop and on 13 October 1382, he resigned. He recommended Rupert of Jülich-Berg as his successor, however, the chapter elected Lüdinghausen instead.

Potho's contemporaries generally held a negative view of his performance. Several epigrams accuse him of greed and insobriety. One cause of his bad reputation may have been his lack of language skills. He did not understand the Low German dialect spoken in Münster and this made relations with his subjects problematic.

After Potho resignation in Münster, Potho moved to the episcopal see of Schwerin. At the time, Bützow Castle was the residence of the bishops of Schwerin. However, the cathedral chapter refused to recognize him and elected John IV Junge instead. John IV was murdered in 1389 by one of his captains. Even after John IV's death, Potho was unable to take up de facto government. He lived in Stralsund until his death.

It is unknown where Potho was buried.

== Sources ==
- Friedrich Wilhelm Ebeling: Die deutschen Bischöfe bis zum Ende des sechszehnten Jahrhunderts, vol. 2, Leipzig, 1858 online
- Wilhelm Kohl: Die Bistümer der Kirchenprovinz Köln. Das Bistum Münster 7,3: Die Diözese, in the series Germania sacra, new series vol. 37.3, Berlin, 2003, ISBN 978-3-11-017592-9 Partially online
- Wilhelm Kohl: Die Bistümer der Kirchenprovinz Köln. Das Bistum Münster 7,1: Die Diözese, in the series Germania sacra, new series vol. 37.3, Berlin, 1999, ISBN 978-3-11-016470-1 Partially online
- Grewolls, Grete (2011). Wer war wer in Mecklenburg und Vorpommern. Das Personenlexikon (in German). Rostock: Hinstorff Verlag. p. 7743. ISBN 978-3-356-01301-6.

John III Potho of Pothenstein House of Pottenstein Died: 1390
Regnal titles
Catholic Church titles
Preceded by Florence of Wevelinkhoven	Prince-bishop of Münster as John II; 1379–1382	Succeeded by Heidenreich Wolf of Lüdinghausen
Preceded by Melchior	Prince-bishop of Schwerin as John III; 1382–1390	Succeeded by Rudolph III
