= Vreta =

Vreta may refer to:

- A part of Häggeby och Vreta, a locality in Håbo Municipality, Sweden
- A part of Ytternäs och Vreta, a locality situated in Uppsala Municipality, Sweden
- A village in Kimitoön Municipality, Finland
- Vreta Abbey, an abbey in Linköping Municipality, Sweden
