= Master of the Bützow Altarpiece =

15th–16th century anonymous German painter

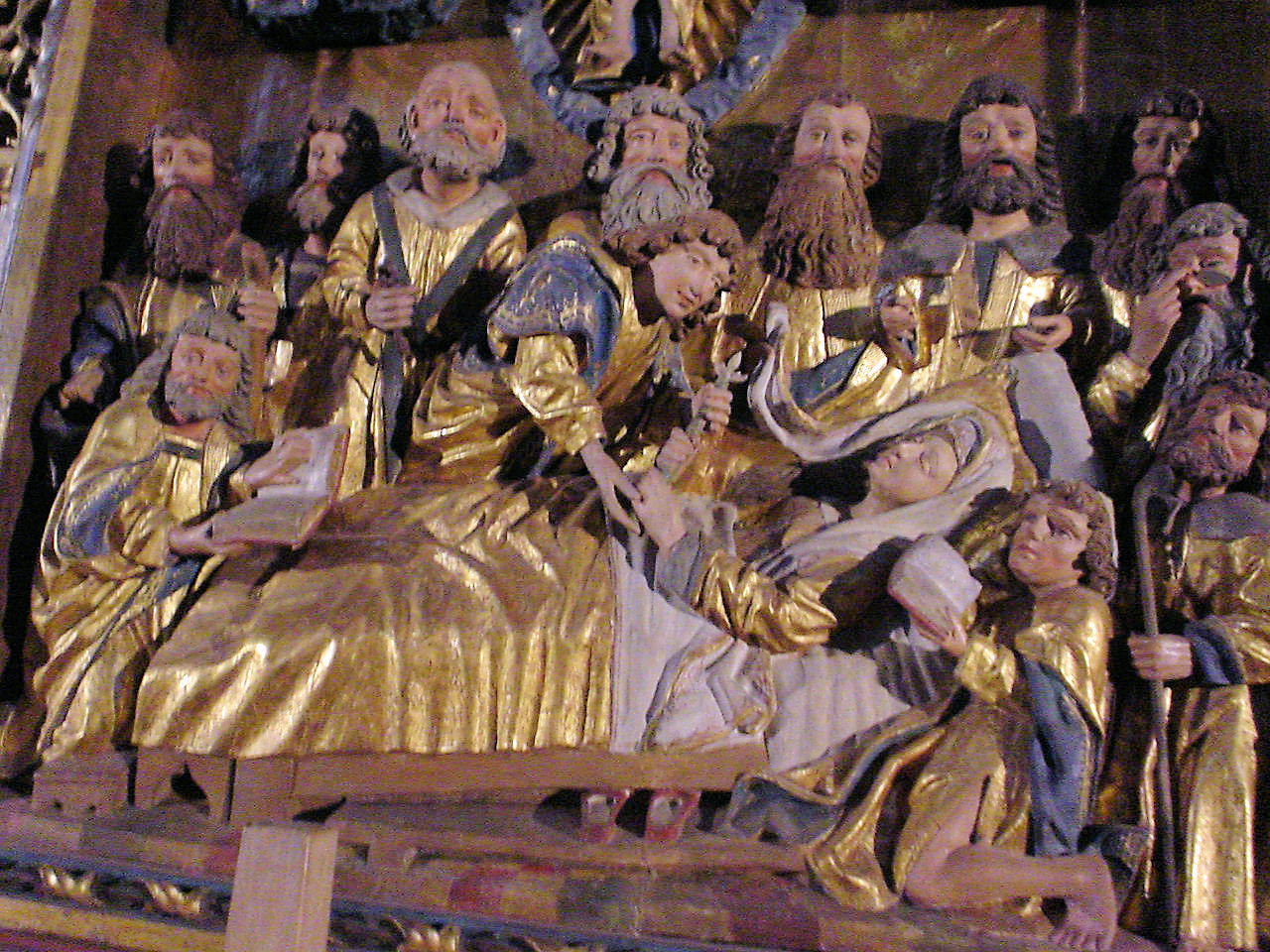
Detail from the carvings on the Bützow altar

The Master of the Bützow Altarpiece was a German painter, active in the area around Lübeck around 1500 and influenced by the work of Wilm Dedeke. They are named for a major altarpiece painted for the church of Bützow, still held in the ambulatory of the church.

The Bützow altar is composed of two pairs of gates, the first fixed and sculpted, the second movable and painted. The second gates are painted with four saints on the outside, eight scenes from the life of Saint Anne, and the Virgin Mary on the inside.

The altarpieces and predella of the altar in the church of the Madonna of Singo in Sweden and the battens of the altar to Saint Anne in Trodens (now stored at the Museum of Bergen in Norway) are also attributed to this anonymous artist. The artist probably collaborated on the Altar of the Sacred Sacrement, also known as the Fronleichnamaltar and now stored in Lübeck in the museum of Saint Anne, by painting people with rigid limbs and inexpressive faces on the movable gates and one of the scenes of the fixed gates.

The doors of a built-in wardrobe are attributed to one of their assistants. The doors contain liturgical supplications datable to the last years of the 15th century and deriving from the church of Saint Catherine of Lübeck. The wardrobe is now stored in the local museum of Saint Anne.

== Bibliography ==
- Busch, Harald, 1943: Meister des Nordens. Die altniederdeutsche Malerei 1450–1550 (2nd revised edition), pp. 101f. Ellermann: Hamburg
- Hegner, Kristina, 2015: Aus Mecklenburgs Kirchen und Klöstern. Der Mittelalterbestand des Staatlichen Museums Schwerin. Petersberg 2015 ISBN 9783731900627
- Lisch, Friedrich, 1862: Der Altar der Kirche zu Witzin in Jahrbücher des Vereins für Mecklenburgische Geschichte und Altertumskunde 27, 1862, pp. 226–227 (online version)
- Schöfbeck, Tilo, and Witt, Detlef, 2014: Die Stiftskirche zu Bützow. Petersberg ISBN 9783731901235
