= Melchior of Brunswick-Grubenhagen =

German aristocrat

Melchior of Brunswick-Grubenhagen (died 1381 or 1384) was a German aristocrat, prince-bishop of Osnabrück from 1369, and then prince-bishop of Schwerin from 1376 to 1381.

He was the son of Henry II, Duke of Brunswick-Grubenhagen.

== Notes ==
Melchior of Brunswick and Lunenburg, Grubenhagen line House of Welf Cadet branch of the House of Este Born: unknown Died: 1381 or 1384
Catholic Church titles
Preceded by Johann Hoet	Prince-Bishop of Osnabrück; 1366–1376	Succeeded by Dietrich of Horne
Preceded by Frederick von Bülow	Prince-Bishop of Schwerin; 1377–1381 (rivalled by anti-bishop Marquard Bermann in 1377/1378)	Succeeded by Potho of Pothenstein
