= Walter Schultz (theologian) =

German theologist and bishop

Walter Schultz (August 20, 1900 in Grevesmühlen - June 26, 1957 in Schnackenburg) was a German theologian.

Schultz became a member of the Nazi Party in 1931. In 1933, he became head of the League of National Socialist Pastors.

He was Landeskirchenführer in Mecklenburg 1933–1945, and bishop in Mecklenburg 1934–45. In 1945, he was interned in Schleswig-Holstein.

After 1950, he returned to a pastoral role.
