= Ulrik of Denmark (1611–1633) =

Ulrich III
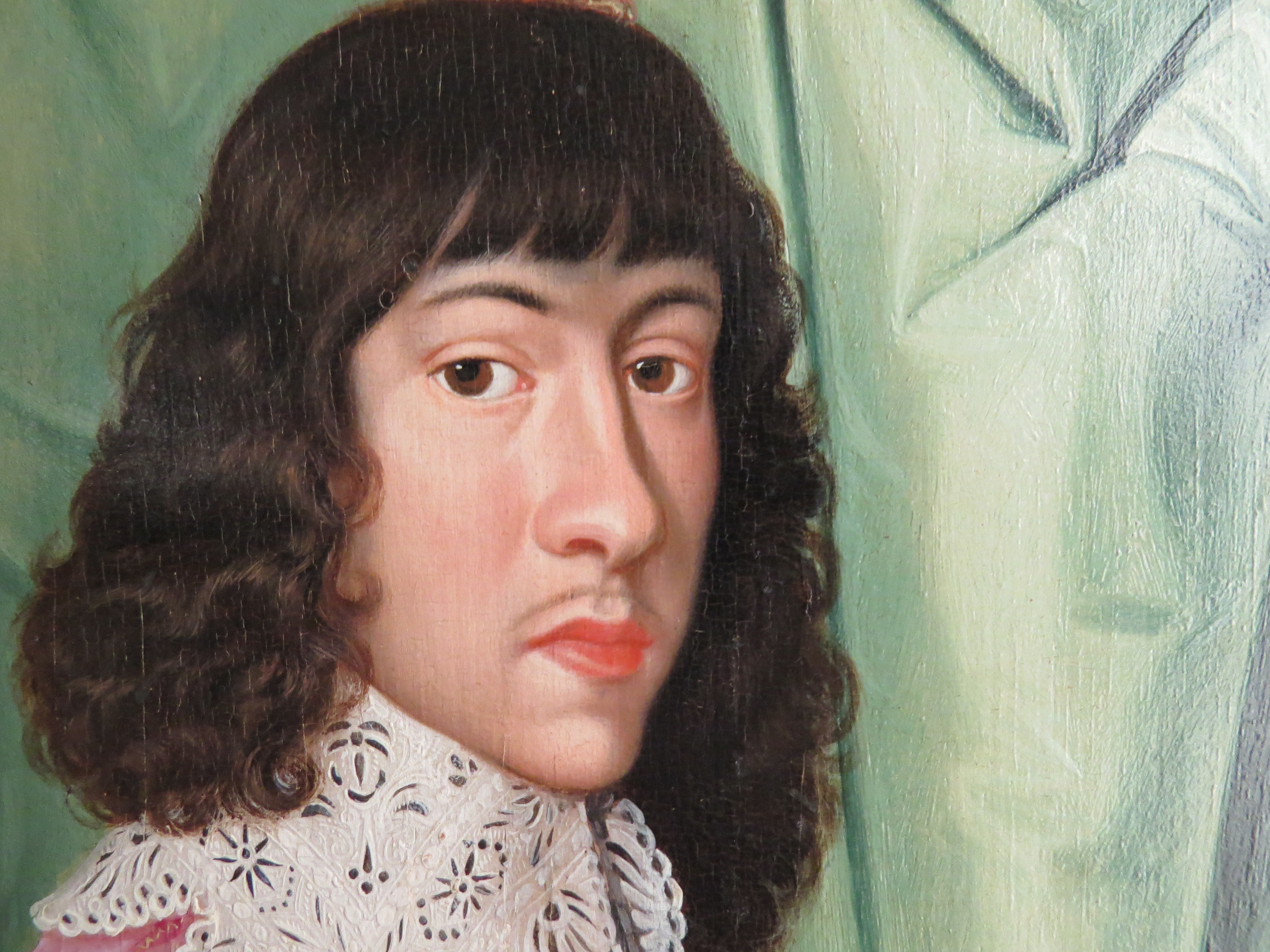
- Duke Ulrik by Wolfgang Heimbach, Rosenborg Slot

Prince-Bishop of Schwerin
- Reign: 1624 – 1629
- Predecessor: Ulrich II
- Successor: Adolf Frederick
- Born: 2 February 1611; Frederiksborg Palace, Hillerød
- Died: 12 August 1633 (aged 22); Schweidnitz
- Burial: (1) 1634 (2) April? 1642 (1) Church of Our Lady, Copenhagen (2) Roskilde Cathedral, Roskilde
- House: Oldenburg
- Father: Christian IV of Denmark
- Mother: Anne Catherine of Brandenburg
- Religion: Lutheran

Prince Ulrik of Denmark (2 February 1611 – 12 August 1633) was a son of King Christian IV of Denmark and Norway and his consort Queen Anne Catherine of Brandenburg. As the fourth-born son, he bore the merely titular rank of Duke of Holstein and Schleswig, Stormarn and Ditmarsh; however, he had no share in the royal-ducal condominial rule of Holstein and Schleswig, wielded by the heads of the houses of Oldenburg (royal) and its cadet branch Holstein-Gottorp (ducal). In 1624 Ulrik was appointed administrator of the Prince-Bishopric of Schwerin as Ulrich III. However, in 1628 Wallenstein's conquest of the prince-bishopric de facto deposed him. His father had to renounce all his family claims to prince-bishoprics in 1629. When in 1631 Swedish forces reconquered the prince-bishopric Ulrik failed to reascend as administrator.

== Ecclesiastical career ==
During his early childhood, he was raised under the supervision of Beate Huitfeldt. In 1617 Niels Frandsen, conrector in Roskilde, became the teacher of Duke Ulrik. A few years later Christian IV wielded his influence in order to provide his third-born son Frederick and Ulrik with prebendaries in Lutheran-ruled prince-bishoprics within the Holy Roman Empire.

In 1622 Ulrik received a canonicate at Bremen Cathedral chapter, where his brother Frederick had been appointed as coadjutor in September 1621, a function usually including the succession to the see. Also in 1622 Ulrik was elected coadjutor of the Prince-Bishopric of Schwerin, where his homonymous uncle served as Administrator Ulrich II. The plan to further provide him with the Pomeranian Prince-Bishopric of Cammin failed.

When Frederick, who had further become coadjutor of the Verden see in November 1621, ascended there as Administrator Frederick II of the Prince-Bishopric of Verden, Ulrik followed him to Verden upon Aller. When his uncle Ulrich II suddenly died in 1624, he and his grandmother the Danish Queen consort Sophie of Mecklenburg-Güstrow attended Ulrich II's funeral and burial in the Collegiate Church of Ss. Mary, John and Elisabeth of Hungary in Bützow on 24 May 1624. They successfully effected Ulrik's succession as Administrator Ulrich III of Schwerin. Because he was only 13 years old, a steward cabinet was installed, but the subjects of the Prince-Bishopric rendered him homage at his visit in Bützow.

Ulrik then dispossessed his aunt, Catherine Hahn-Hinrichshagen, the widow of his uncle Ulrich II. He had endowed her with the manor and estates of Zibühl (a part of today's Dreetz in Mecklenburg) as her allodial dower, which he had bought for 17,000 rixdollars in 1621. After a rebuild and furnishing, including the fixture of her and his coat-of-arms on the outside, Hahn had moved in. Lacking the power she acquiesced on the dispossession for the time being. However, on 16 December 1628, after Wallenstein had conquered the prince-bishopric, Hahn sued Ulrik in the Ducal Court and Land Tribunal of Mecklenburg. Due to the changing fortunes of the Thirty Years' War the tribunal never rendered a verdict.

Meanwhile, Ulrik attended Sorø Academy, and in 1627 he was enfeoffed with the prior Schleswig-episcopally Schwabstedt manor and estates with its revenues, which also had belonged to his uncle. However, unlike his uncle, he was not appointed as Bishop of Schleswig. In the same year he left for a journey to the Republic of the Seven United Netherlands and France, returning in spring 1628.

Shortly after, the same year, he went to war serving under King Gustavus II Adolphus of Sweden at his invasion in Ducal Prussia in the course of the Polish–Swedish War (1626–1629). He achieved recognition by Gustavus Adolphus before he was home in Denmark again in November 1628. Meanwhile, the Catholic Leaguist troops under Albrecht von Wallenstein had conquered most of Jutland forcing Christian IV to sign the Treaty of Lübeck on 22 May 1629, stipulating that Christian IV on his own and his sons' behalf renounced their prince-episcopal positions. Thus Ulrik lost the Schwerin see.

== Military career ==
In support of his maternal uncle Christian IV, King Charles I of England, Ireland, and Scotland had sent English and Scottish mercenaries, who stood in the western Schleswig marshes. In June 1629 Ulrik had the task of ensuring their repatriation over the North Sea. He then travelled via Glückstadt again to the Dutch Republic, fighting under Stadtholder Frederick Henry, Prince of Orange in his Siege of 's-Hertogenbosch until its surrender on 14 September 1629. Thereafter Ulrik returned to Denmark. In April 1630 he accompanied his father in his campaign against Hamburg, where Ulrik got into mortal danger.

In the same time Christian IV tried a rapprochement with Emperor Ferdinand II and Wallenstein in order to regain Schwerin and Verden for his deposed sons. To this end Ulrik participated in the Regensburg Diet of the prince-electors in July to November 1630 (German: Regensburger Kurfürstentag), where he conferred with Leopold V, Archduke of Austria, brother of Ferdinand II, and Wallenstein, however, all in vain. The prince-electors, fearing too strong a position for the emperor, had enforced Wallenstein's dismissal and suspended the Restitution edict, which enabled the Catholic emperor to restitute church property and possessions, held by defeated Lutherans, to the Catholic Church.

Ulrik travelled to England via the Dutch Republic in order to visit his cousin King Charles I, persuading him to pay Ulrik an annual pension. Ulrik spent the winter of 1630/31 in Denmark, before leaving in spring again to fight for the Protestant rulers of Brandenburg and Saxony.

Meanwhile, Swedish Lutheran troops had conquered the Catholic-occupied Prince-Bishopric of Schwerin, so that Ulrik hoped to regain his realm from Gustavus Adolphus. To this end Ulrik even considered the marriage with Princess Christina of Sweden. But regardless of this endeavor and new negotiations from Christian IV's side with the princes, the emperor and Wallenstein did not accept Ulrik's restitution.

Tired of travelling, Ulrik got his father's consent to enter into Saxon military service. In February 1632 he left for John George I, Elector of Saxony. He disliked Dresden court life, where people were more concerned about a good living than the ongoing war. So Ulrik was delighted once he set out for a campaign as a colonel in the Saxon army in March 1632. He advanced to the rank of general of the electoral Saxon artillery.

In Denmark Ulrik recruited a cuirassier company under his command, and – in summer – he joined with it the electoral Saxon army under Hans Georg von Arnim-Boitzenburg for Silesia. He probably participated in the conquest of Gross-Glogau and stayed in Neisse later the year. In a Jesuit College there he found Tycho Brahe's celestial globe, which he sent home to Denmark as war booty. After a quiet and peaceful winter in 1632/1633 fighting resumed in January, and Ulrik had the opportunity to excel.

At the same time the plan for Ulrik's marriage to Christina again surfaced, but was rejected by Axel Oxenstierna. While Ulrik's own interest was still more concerned about the Prince-Bishopric of Schwerin. In May 1633 Wallenstein had been reappointed in charge of the imperial army. His attempts to negotiate with the Protestant enemy regularly gave rise to armistices, and during one of them Ulrik met Wallenstein. During the war efforts, interrupting the negotiations, Ulrik excelled again, inflicting the imperial Croatian riders a significant defeat. New peace talks began between the two sides, and Ulrik participated in them.

On 11 August 1633, during one of these meetings in Schweidnitz, he was fatally wounded by an unexpectedly treacherous shot from an imperial horseman, and died the following night. His body was first taken to Liegnitz, thence to Dresden, where it stayed until spring 1634. After a funeral, it was then brought to Copenhagen, where it was set up in the Church of Our Lady, until his mortal remains found their final rest in Christian IV's chapel in Roskilde Cathedral in 1642.

== Other occupations ==
In addition to being brave, Ulric was characterised as having extensive knowledge of languages and literary interests, besides some small talent for drawing, painting, music and recitation of poems. Particularly in his last year he used to socialise with the poet Martin Opitz, at that time considered the greatest poet of German language. In 1631 Ulrik had already published a small satiric writing: "Strigelis vitiorum" (Scolding the Vices) specially blasting immoderate drinking a vice, which he apparently hated. In contrast to many of his contemporaries, he was quite free. And with all this went hand in hand a rare freshness and zest for action.

== The return of an important portrait of Duke Ulrik in 2010 ==
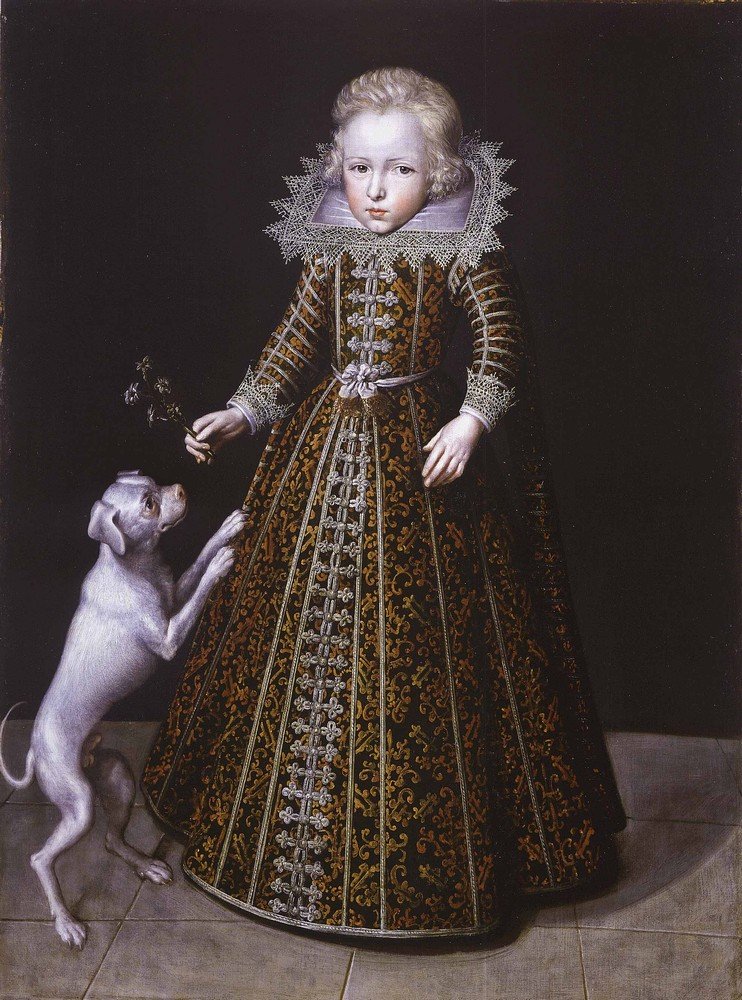
Ulrik of Denmark by Jacob van Doort, ca. 1615

In June 2010, Jacob van Doort's portrait of Duke Ulrik was brought back to Denmark due to a donation from the Augustinus foundation. The painting had been positively identified as being a childhood portrait of Duke Ulrik by Professor Steffen Heiberg who has written several books about King Christian IV and his reign. In 2008 the Danish-English Artconnaisseur and projectmanager, Msc. MCM Martin Guise, noticed the portrait at the Weiss Gallery in London. Following this Martin Guise started a private project to bring the portrait back to Denmark before it ended in a private collection again.

In 2009 he contacted the Royal collection museum at Rosenborg Castle in Copenhagen and joined forces with the museum in order to bring the portrait back. The project was a success and the portrait was bought by the museum in 2010 with the donation from the Augustinus Foundation. It was revealed at spectacular event at Rosenborg Castle where the young Prince Christian, revealed the portrait together with his grandfather Prince Henrik, the prince consort. The portrait of Duke Ulrik has subsequently been placed in prominent hanging place in the writing room of King Christian IV at Rosenborg Castle - a room which has remained almost as when the King lived. The return of the portrait is significant because the wars and financial deficits during the reign of Christian IV greatly diminished the collection in Denmark of objects relating to his reign and immediate family.

== Ancestry ==
Ancestors of Ulrik of Denmark (1611–1633)

16. Frederick I of Denmark (=#22)
8. Christian III of Denmark
17. Anna of Brandenburg
4. Frederick II of Denmark
18. Magnus I, Duke of Saxe-Lauenburg
9. Dorothea of Saxe-Lauenburg
19. Catherine of Brunswick-Wolfenbüttel
2. Christian IV of Denmark
20. Albrecht VII, Duke of Mecklenburg
10. Ulrich, Duke of Mecklenburg
21. Anna of Brandenburg
5. Sophie of Mecklenburg-Güstrow
22. Frederick I of Denmark (=#16)
11. Elizabeth of Denmark
23. Sophie of Pomerania
1. Ulrik of Denmark
24. Joachim II Hector, Elector of Brandenburg
12. John George, Elector of Brandenburg
25. Magdalena of Saxony
6. Joachim Frederick, Elector of Brandenburg
26. Frederick II, Duke of Liegnitz
13. Sophie of Liegnitz
27. Sophie of Brandenburg-Ansbach-Kulmbach
3. Anne Catherine of Brandenburg
28. Joachim I Nestor, Elector of Brandenburg
14. John I, Margrave of Brandenburg-Küstrin
29. Elizabeth of Denmark
7. Catherine of Brandenburg-Küstrin
30. Henry V, Duke of Brunswick-Lüneburg
15. Catherine of Brunswick-Wolfenbüttel
31. Maria of Württemberg

== In literature and media ==
Ulrik features prominently in the following works:

- Ulrik is a minor character in 1634: The Baltic War by Eric Flint and David Weber

Ulrich III House of Oldenburg Born: 2 February 1611 in Hillerød Died: 12 August 1633 in Schweidnitz
Regnal titles
Religious titles
| Preceded by Ulrich II | Administrator of the Prince-Bishopric of Schwerin; 1624–1629 | Vacant Title next held by Adolf Frederick |
