= Jehmlich Orgelbau Dresden =

German organ building company

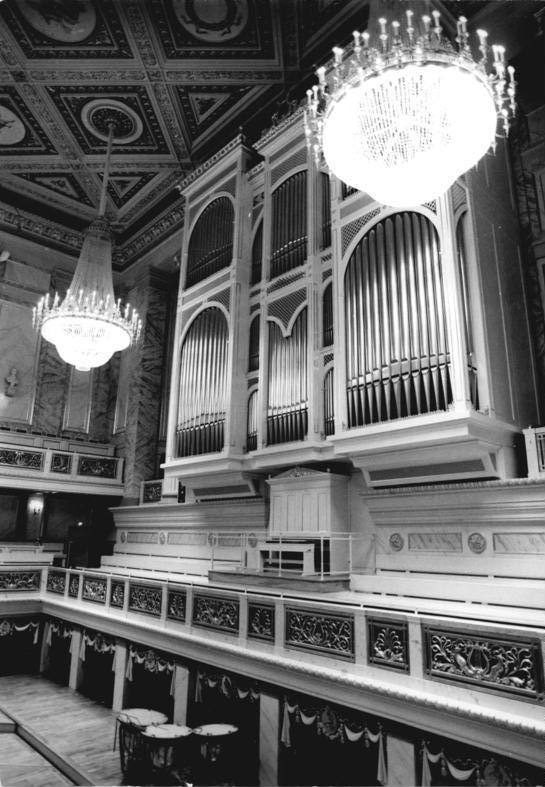
Jehmlich organ of the reconstructed Schauspielhaus, now Konzerthaus Berlin, 1984

Jehmlich Orgelbau Dresden is a privately owned organ building and restoration company in Dresden, Germany.

== History ==
The company was founded in 1808 in Cämmerswalde by three brothers, Gotthelf Friedrich, Johann Gotthold und Carl Gottlieb Jehmlich. The first organ was built in 1818. In 1826 the company was moved to Dresden. It was led from 1862 to 1889 by Carl Eduard Jehmlich, then by the brothers Emil and Bruno Jehmlich, after 1938 by Otto and Rudolf Jehmlich until 1972. In 1972 the company was nationalized as VEB Jehmlich Orgelbau. Because of the specific expertise Horst Jehmlich became the director and family control was maintained. After the German reunification the company was reprivatized in 1990. In 2006 Ralf Jehmlich joined the company's leadership representing the sixth generation.

In 2000, Jehmlich joined with Meissen to build the first porcelain organ.

== Organs ==
By 2014 Jehmlich had built 1161 organs.

A partial list of organs built by Jehmlich Orgelbau can be found on the corresponding German website Jehmlich Orgelbau.
