= St James' Church, Lübeck =

Church in Lübeck, Germany

Coordinates: 53.8709°N 10.6890°E

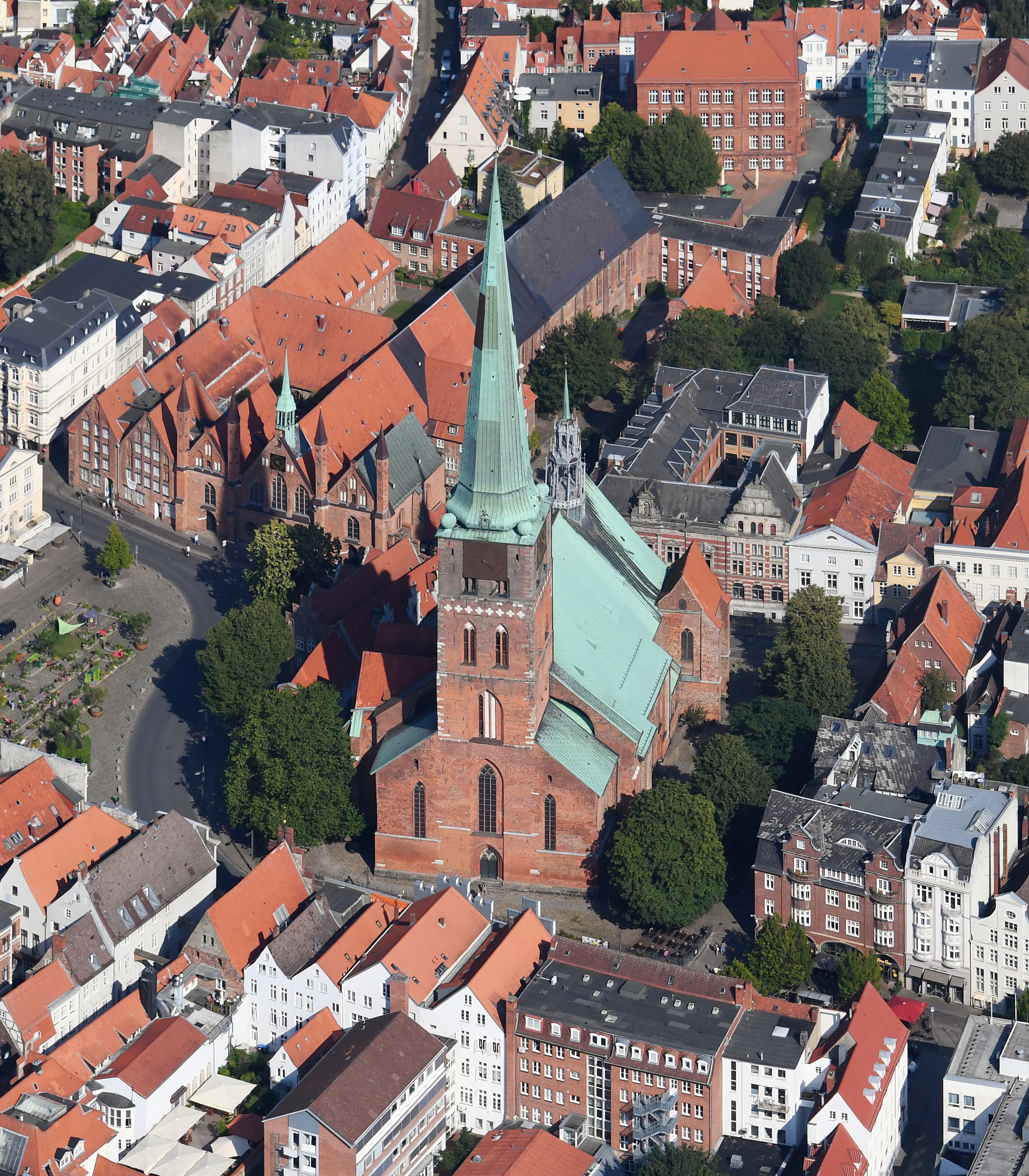
Aerial view of St. James' Church

St. James' Church (German: Jakobikirche) is one of the five main Evangelical Lutheran parish churches in Lübeck's old town, Germany.

It was consecrated in 1334, serving as a church for sailors and fishermen who still have their "Schütting" (originally from the Norwegian "Skotting" and now known as Schøttstuene) for meeting houses in the shipping company opposite the church. The patron saint of the church is Saint James the Elder. The church also serves as a stop on a branch of the North German Way of St. James, alongside the Holy Spirit Hospital and the neighboring Gertrudenherberge. Since September 2007, the northern tower chapel of the church has been a national memorial for civil seafaring, known as the Pamir Chapel.

== Building history ==
The Jakobikirche is a three-aisled brick hall church. The current building on Koberg was built around 1300 and, after the great city fire of 1276, replaced a Romanesque hall church on the same site, which was already mentioned around 1227. It is assumed that round arch friezes in the area of the church tower and the aisle walls are components of this previous building. Since the new Gothic building around 1300, the church has had three naves with five bays, each of which is closed off by a choir in the east. The walls of the central nave tower over the two side aisles by five meters. The tower of the church reveals something similar to that of St. Petersomething about the building intentions changing over time. Initially planned as a central single tower and construction began, the northern and southern side chapels were so strong that initially, as with St. Petri, there must have been a plan to equip the church, like St. Mary's Church and the cathedral, with a double tower system. The plan to convert the hall church into a basilica at the end of the 13th century can also be seen from the building findings that still exist today, but the implementation that had begun was abandoned. [B 2] The main construction period of the current building is determined based on sources relating to the Gothic altars. A vicarie was built in 1287 for a new altardonated. This altar is then documented for 1312. The new altar table with the choir was consecrated in 1334 by Bishop Heinrich II Bochholt. The oldest surviving Lübeck high altar retable was donated to this altar table in 1435 as an altarpiece by the master of the Jakobialtar, presumably by the parish. It is now in the medieval collection of the Schwerin State Museum in Güstrow Castle.

The tower of this church initially only towered over the ridge of the central nave by two full floors. Above it there were pointed gables like those of St. Mary's Church. Above it was the octagonal pyramid of the spire. The tower is probably one of the more problematic of Lübeck's church towers. The reading master Detmar reports in his chronicle that in 1375 a quarter of the tower roof came off in a storm and was blown into the courtyard of the Holy Spirit Hospital. [B4]In 1628 the tower was removed “up to the bells” and, after the masonry was renewed in 1636, it was initially given a simple wooden roof. The spire was only renewed in 1657/58 and only then received the four balls at the corners of the tower that are so typical of the church today, which took up the four corner turrets of St. Petri, but did not copy them. A document scratched in copper by the Lübeck master calculator Arnold Möller, which also survived fires, reports on this renovation and everyone involved in it. The top of the tower was struck by lightning several times, most recently in 1901, and burned for about a day in 1901.

Of the attached chapels, the Brömbsen Chapel is probably the best known because of the Brömbsen altar on the south side. It goes back to a foundation by Canon Detmar Schulop in 1338 and went to Lübeck's mayor Heinrich Brömse in 1488. It remained in his family until 1826. In 1877, it was returned to the church by an executor of the Brömse family's will. The Vellin or Warendorp Chapel next to it was founded on a foundation by Councilor Gotthardt Vellin († 1350) and passed to the Warendorp family with the death of his widow, who owned it until the 18th century. On the north side opposite the Brömbsen Chapel is the Hoghehus or Haleholtscho Chapel, which was donated by Konrad Hogehus († 1351). It later passed into the possession of the Haleholtscho families, Warendorp, von Dorne (1712). The two other chapels to the west of the north side are attested for the year 1392. The sacristy of the church in the southeast is an addition from the beginning of the 15th century. The shell motif on its wooden paneling from 1667 is reminiscent of the shell as a symbol of the pilgrims to St. James. The tower chapel under the central tower was owned by the brewers' guild. The chapel north of the tower was named Wittenkapelle after the mayor of Lübeck, Hinrich Witte, and later the pallbearer chapel because of the equipment stored there. This chapel today commemorates the sinking of the Pamirs. There has been one under the chapel since 2007Columbarium as an urn burial place. The southern tower chapel was formerly the Marientiden chapel.

St. Jakobi has one of the most graceful and richest roof turret in the city. According to Reimar Kock’s chronicle, it was first built in 1496 but was soon blown down again by a storm. Since it can be found again in Elias Diebel’s large Lübeck woodcut in 1552, it must have been rebuilt around the middle of the 16th century. Today's roof turret is a baroque creation from the years 1622–28. [B 6] It has been rebuilt several times. Its lower part with the pinnacles has late Gothic elements, while the upper lantern, in which the bells hang, and the spire date back to the Renaissance are influenced. Delicate spars with gilded flags decorate the upper part, the style of which also includes the vase frieze from which the pinnacles grow.

The church's important medieval frescoes were rediscovered during renovation work at the end of the 19th century.

St. Jakobi was one of the few churches in Lübeck that remained undamaged during the bombing raid on Palm Sunday night in 1942. It therefore has the last two historic organs in Lübeck. The gallery under the large organ was expanded in 1932 to accommodate a larger choir and a small orchestra.

Next to the church, towards the Koberg, in the Jakobikirchhof are the pastors' houses in the style of the Dutch brick Renaissance.

== Pastors ==
- Approx. 1480–approx. 1495: Levo Leve
- 1530–1574: Peter Christian von Friemersheim, gave the first Protestant sermon in Lübeck in 1526
- 1613–1625: Hermann Wolff († 1625), from 1622 also Senior
- 1610–1613: Adam Helms (1579–1653), preacher
- 1626–1661: Gerhard Winter (1589–1661)
- 1662–1685: Heinrich Engenhagen (1615–1685), preacher since 1643
- 1691–1696: Hermann Westhoff (the younger) (1635–1696)
- 1695–1706: Heinrich Dürkop (1671–1731), preacher
- 1697–1706: Levin Burchard Langschmidt (1654–1722)
- 1739–1767: Georg Hermann Richerz (1716–1767)
- 1745–1752: Johann Jacob von Melle (1721–1752)
- 1767–1788: Peter Hermann Becker (1730–1788)
- 1801–1831: Heinrich Caspar Münzenberger (1764–1831)
- 1840–1868: Marcus Jochim Carl Klug (1799–1872)
- 1868–1891: Gustav Hofmeier (1826–1893)
- 1889–1915: Heinrich Lindenberg (1842–1924), 1889 archdeacon, 1891 senior pastor, 1909–1914 at the same time senior
- 1928–1944: Axel Werner Kühl (1893–1944)

== See also ==
- 16th-century Western domes

== Mourning Soldier of the Landsturm ==
Art installation

In 1919, the Mourning Soldier of the Landsturm war memorial—created by Fritz Behn on behalf of his former congregation but still incomplete at the time—was inaugurated. It depicts a 4½-meter-tall soldier of the Landsturm carved from shell limestone, shown in prayer with his head bowed and holding his steel helmet in his hand.

The monument was later expanded to include brick walls on either side bearing the names of the 305 congregation members who fell in the First World War.

Since 2017, the brick walls have been concealed and the sculpture obscured by an eight-meter-high fabric art installation, intended to facilitate a new form of engagement with the culture of remembrance.
