= Bützow Castle =

- Schloss Bützow
- Bützow, Mecklenburg-Vorpommern
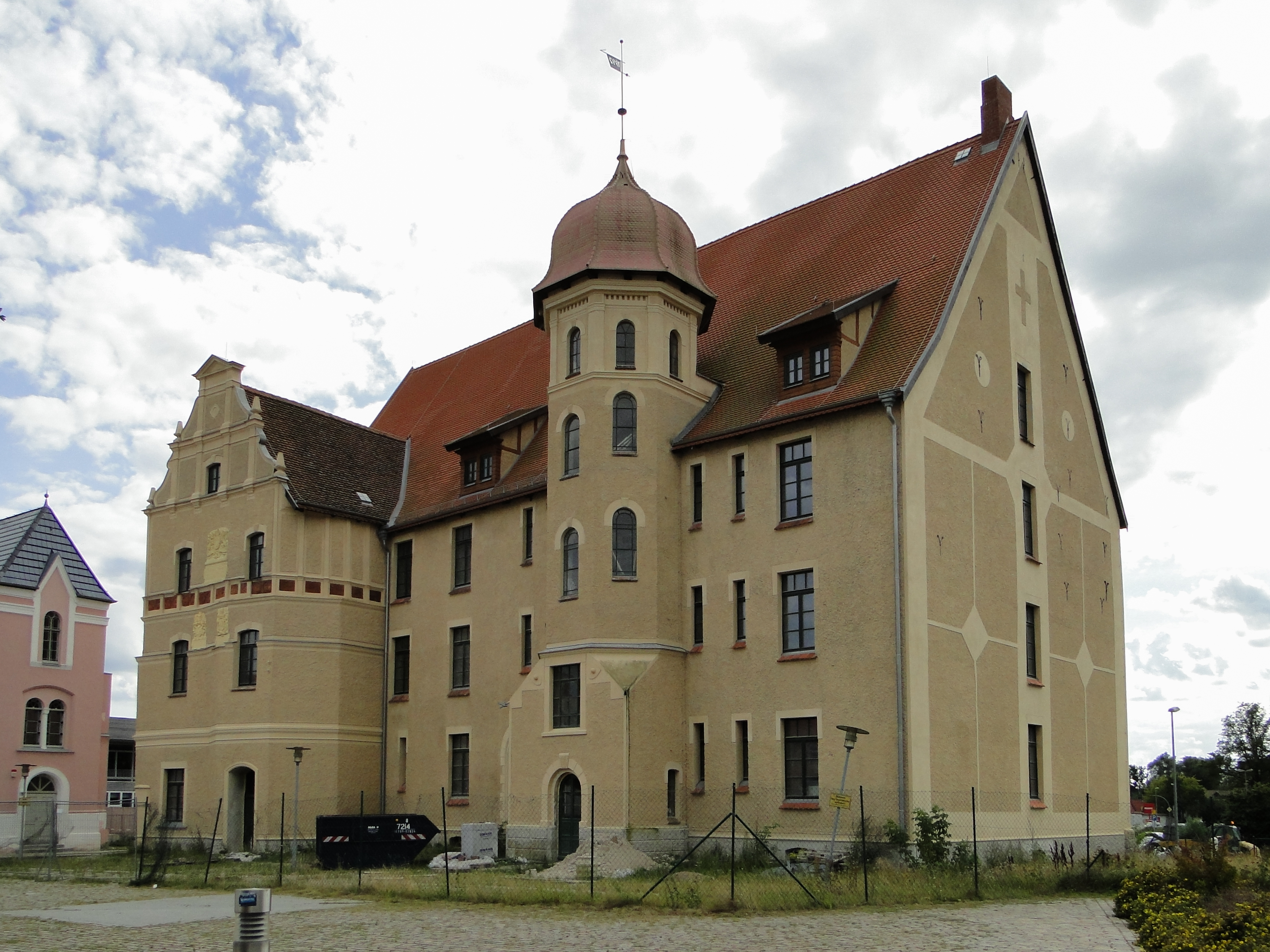
- Bützow Castle

Site information
- Type: Castle

Location
- Location in Germany
- Coordinates: 53.847222°N 11.976667°E

Bützow Castle (German: Schloss Bützow) is a castle in Bützow, Germany.

The castle is built on the foundations of a Slav fortress, and served as the residential castle of the bishops of Schwerin. It was transformed into a Renaissance castle by Duke Ulrich of Mecklenburg in 1556.
