= Rühn =

- Municipality
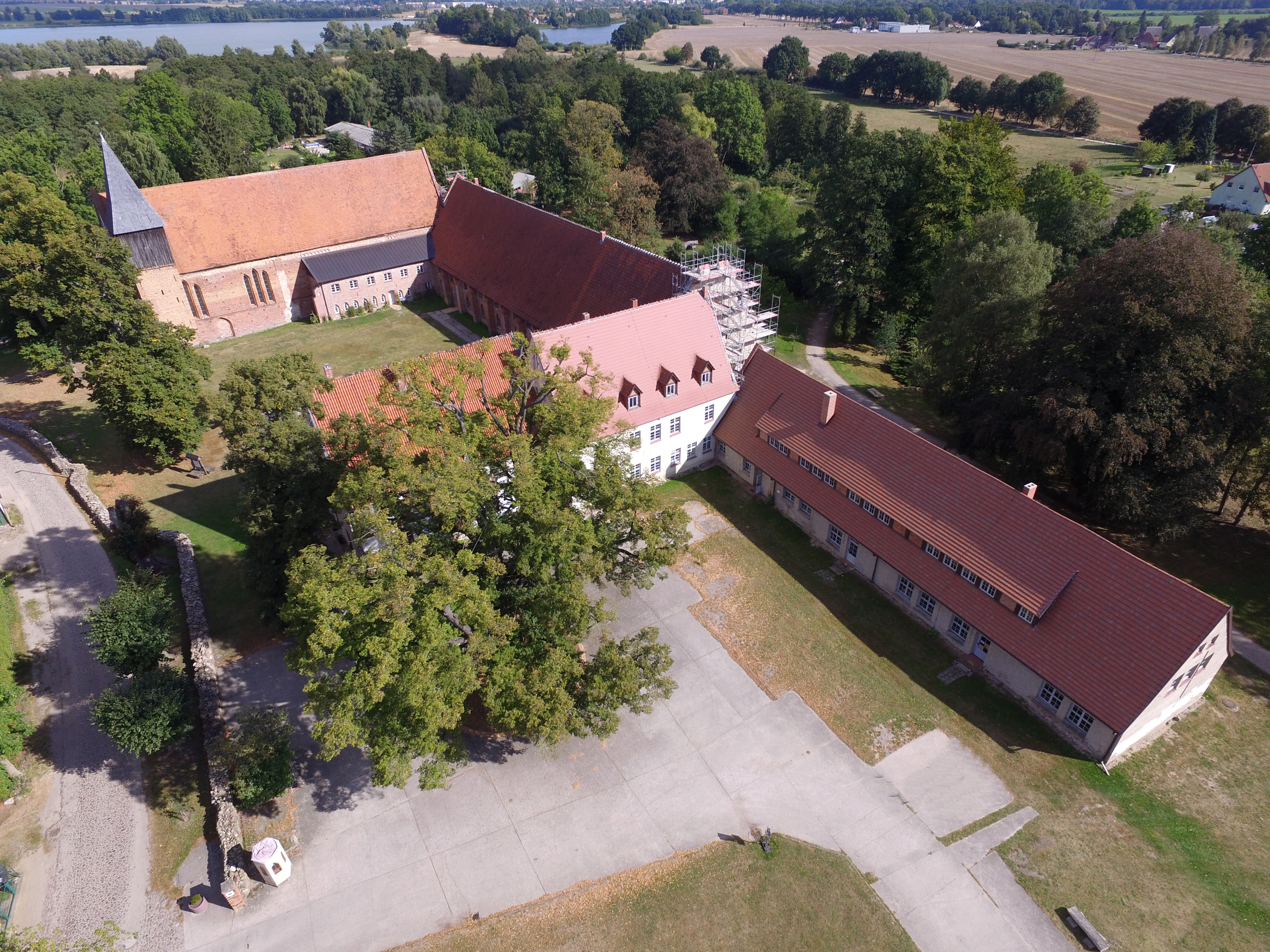
- Former monastery in Rühn

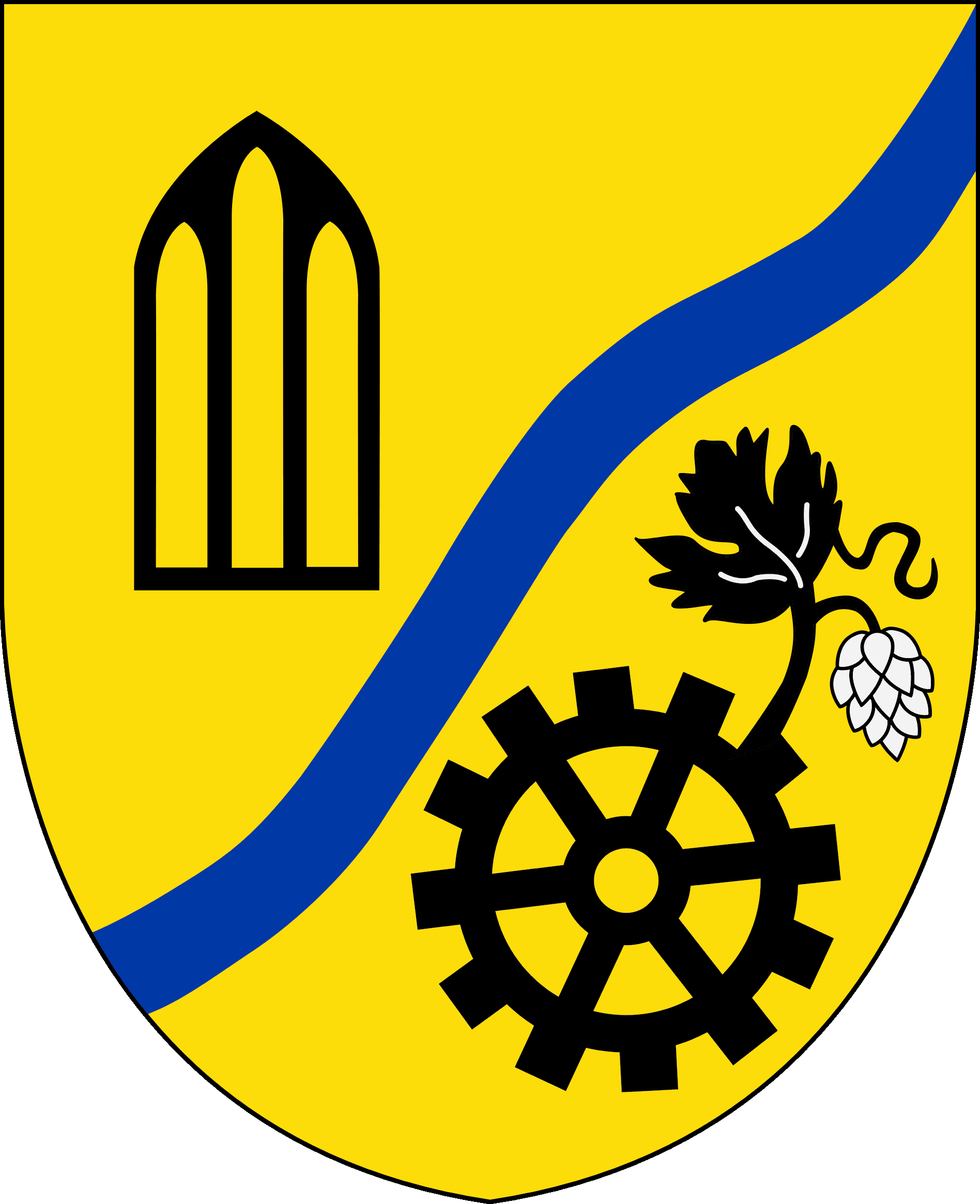
- Coat of arms

- Location of Rühn within Rostock district
- Interactive map of Rühn
- Location within Germany Location within Mecklenburg-Vorpommern
- Coordinates: 53°49′12″N 11°56′06″E
- Country: Germany
- State: Mecklenburg-Vorpommern
- District: Rostock
- Municipal assoc.: Bützow-Land

Government
  - Mayor: Hans-Georg Harloff

Area
  - Total: 14.41 km^{2} (5.56 sq mi)
- Elevation: 7 m (23 ft)

Population (2025-12-31)
  - Total: 598
  - Density: 41.5/km^{2} (107/sq mi)
- Time zone: UTC+01:00 (CET)
  - Summer (DST): UTC+02:00 (CEST)
- Postal codes: 18246
- Dialling codes: 038461
- Vehicle registration: LRO
- Website: www.amt-buetzow-land.de

Rühn is a municipality in the Rostock district, in Mecklenburg-Vorpommern, Germany.
