= Häggeby och Vreta =

- Location within Uppsala Location within Sweden
- Coordinates: 59°39′15″N 17°32′30″E
- Country: Sweden
- Province: Uppland
- County: Uppsala County
- Municipality: Håbo Municipality

Area
  - Total: 0.62 km^{2} (0.24 sq mi)

Population (31 December 2010)
  - Total: 224
  - Density: 364/km^{2} (940/sq mi)
- Time zone: UTC+1 (CET)
  - Summer (DST): UTC+2 (CEST)

Häggeby och Vreta is a locality situated in Håbo Municipality, Uppsala County, Sweden with 224 inhabitants in 2010.
