= Bützow =

Town in Mecklenburg-Vorpommern, Germany

- Town
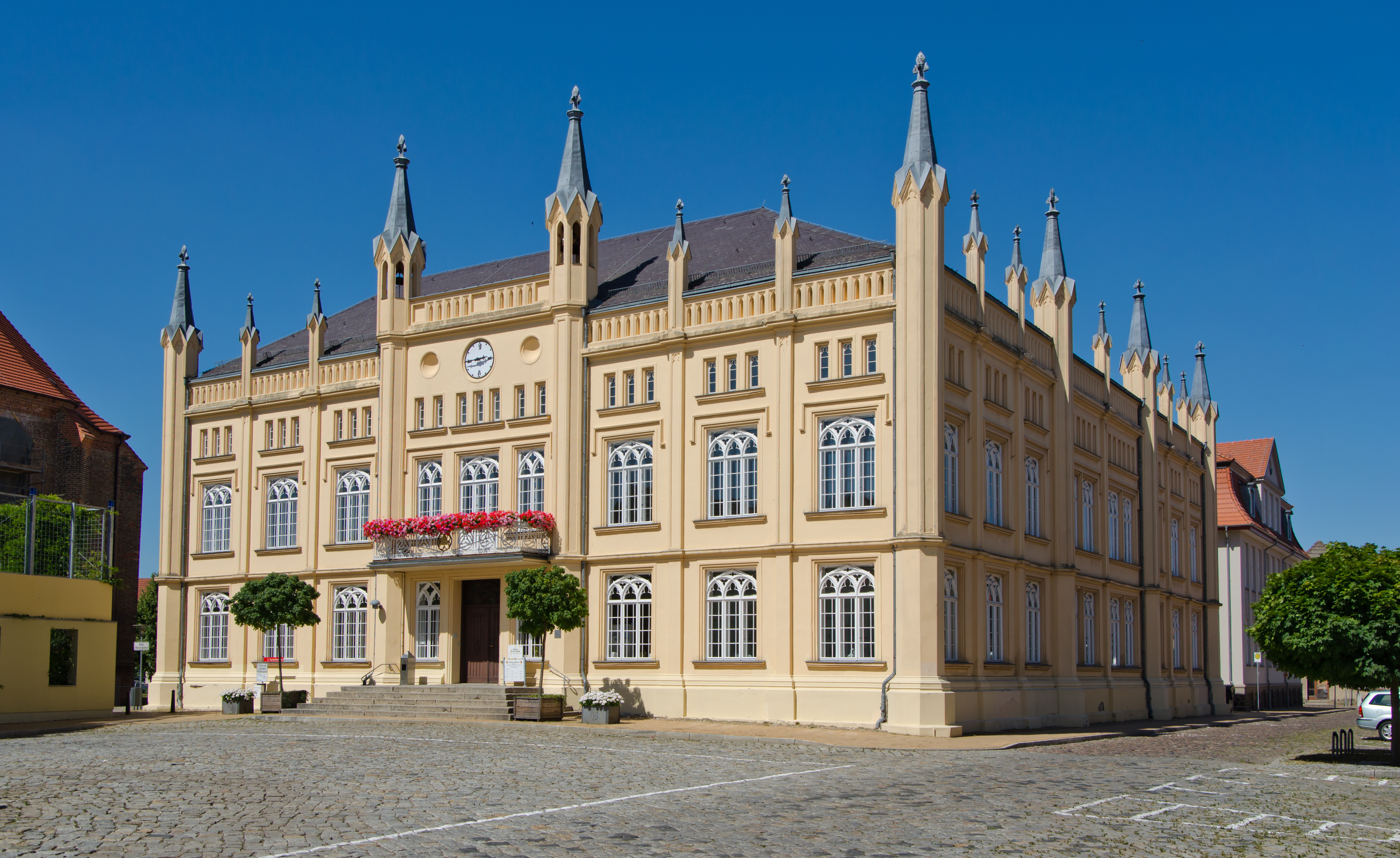
- Town hall

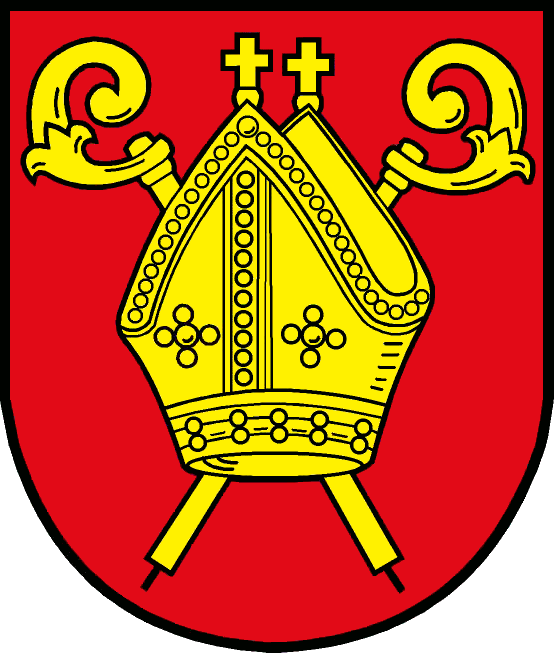
- Coat of arms

- Location of Bützow within Rostock district
- Interactive map of Bützow
- Location within Germany Location within Mecklenburg-Vorpommern
- Coordinates: 53°51′N 11°59′E
- Country: Germany
- State: Mecklenburg-Vorpommern
- District: Rostock
- Municipal assoc.: Bützow-Land

Government
  - Mayor: Christian Grüschow (Ind.)

Area
  - Total: 39.85 km^{2} (15.39 sq mi)
- Elevation: 2 m (6.6 ft)

Population (2025-12-31)
  - Total: 7,668
  - Density: 192.4/km^{2} (498.4/sq mi)
- Time zone: UTC+01:00 (CET)
  - Summer (DST): UTC+02:00 (CEST)
- Postal codes: 18246
- Dialling codes: 038461
- Vehicle registration: LRO, BÜZ, DBR, GÜ, ROS, TET
- Website: www.buetzow.de

Bützow (German pronunciation: [ˈbʏtsoː]) is a town in the district of Rostock in Mecklenburg-Vorpommern in north-eastern Germany, centered on Bützower See.

== History ==
The town was first mentioned in 1171. From 1815 to 1918 Bützow was part of the Grand Duchy of Mecklenburg-Schwerin, from 1871 within the German Empire.

From 1933 to 1945, during Nazi rule and World War II, a Nazi prison was operated in the Dreibergen district with multiple forced labour subcamps located in various places in the region. After the war, the town was part of East Germany until 1990.

On 5 May 2015, the town was struck by an F3 tornado which caused severe damage to many buildings, including the local hospital. This tornado grew to 1.5 km wide (1500m)

== Culture ==
Medieval Bützow Castle is located in Bützow. The town also has a medieval Brick Gothic church, which contains an altarpiece made by the Master of the Bützow Altarpiece (1503). Bützow also has one of the last German monuments dedicated to Lenin, a memorial stone located at Leninring.

== Notable people ==
- Dietrich Ludwig Gustav Karsten (1768-1810), mineralogist
- Karl Johann Bernhard Karsten (1782–1853), mineralogist.
- Else Hirsch (1889-1943), Jewish teacher and member of the German Resistance

=== Sport ===
- Eckhard Martens (born 1951), rower, team silver medallist at the 1972 Summer Olympics
- Torsten Fröhling (born 1966), soccer player and football coach; played 109 games
- Andrea Philipp (born 1971), sprinter and three time Olympic competitor

== People who have worked in Bützow ==
- Sophie Charlotte of Hesse-Kassel (1678-1749), Duchess of Mecklenburg, lived in Bützow and founded the German Reformed Church
- Wenceslaus Johann Gustav Karsten (1732-1787), mathematician, grew up locally with his grandfather; twice rector of the University of Bützow
