= Stefano Ticozzi =

Italian art historian (1762–1836)

Stefano Ticozzi (30 January 1762 – 3 October 1836) was an Italian politician, scholar and art historian. He is best known for his two-volume Dizionario degli architetti, scultori, pittori, an up-to-date assembly of biographical data and works of artists from Europe of the prior four centuries to the contemporary time.

== Biography ==
Stefano Ticozzi was born in Pasturo, near Como. A staunch Bonapartist, he was Prefect of the Department of the Piave during the Cisalpine Republic (1797–9). Among his publications are two critical biographies of artists of the Veneto (an area he visited), the more important of which is that of 1817, on Titian and other painters of the Vecellio family. This work, which shows a certain Neoclassical incomprehension with regard to the Venetian master of colour, evoked a lively protest in Andrea Majer's book Della imitazione pittorica (1818).

Ticozzi's two dictionaries of artists (1818, 1830–33) contain similar Neoclassical prejudices: the article on Guarino Guarini, for example, concludes ‘He died, to the advantage of art, in 1683’. He also carried forward the work of Giovanni Gaetano Bottari, whose collection of artists’ letters (1757–68) he supplemented with an eighth volume consisting of more than 300 new letters written by contemporary figures such as Francesco Algarotti, Johann Joachim Winckelmann and Antonio Canova.

As the publisher of some classic essays on art, he occasionally made editorial interventions; for example, in Vincenzo Scamozzi’s Trattato di architettura (Milan, 1838) he changed the original order of the chapters and deleted passages he considered superfluous. Ticozzi also published Giovanni Battista Armenini's sixteenth century treatise on painting: De veri precetti della pittura.

Ticozzi died in Lecco on 3 October 1836. He was an honorary member of the Accademia Carrara and the Atheneum of Venice.

== Writings ==
- Vite de’ pittori Vecelli di Cadore (Milan, 1817)
- Dizionario dei pittori del Rinascimento delle arti fino al 1800 (Milan, 1818)
- ed.: Raccolta di lettere sulla pittura, scultura ed architettura, 8 (Milan, 1822–5) [i–vi, ed. G. Bottari, 1757–68; vii, ed. L. Crespi, 1773]
- Dizionario degli architetti, scultori, pittori, intagliatori in rame ed in pietra, coniatori di medaglie, musaicisti niellatori, intarsiatori d’ogni età e d’ogni nazione (Milan, 1830–33)

== Catalogue of monograms ==
Among the artists for which Ticozzi graphically reproduces the monograms are the following:

- 1 Adam, Veneziano Agostino
- 2 Cavaliere Cherubino Alberti
- 3 Enrico Aldegrever
- 4 Alberto Altorfer
- 5 Pomponio Amalteo
- 6 Jost Ammon
- 7 Andrea Appiani
- 8 Michele l'Asne
- 9 Roberto Audenard
- 10 Cesare de Avibus
- 11 Francesco Babel
- 12 Alessandro Badiale
- 13 Hans Baldung
- 14 Antonio Balestra
- 15 Domenico del Barbiere
- 16 Giovanni Guglielmo Bauer
- 17 Nicoló Beatricio or Beatricetto
- 18 Domenico Beccafumi
- 19 Hans Sebal Beham
- 20 Stefano della Bella
- 21 Carlo Berghem
- 22 Cornelio Blecker
- 23 Bartholomeo Bohem
- 24 Giovanni Sebaldo Bohem (likely HS Beham above)
- 25 Scheid Bolswert (Schelte a Bolswert)
- 26 Domenico Bonavera
- 27 Orazio Borgianni
- 28 Abramo Bosse
- 29 Renato Boyvin (René Boyvin)
- 30 Francesco Brizio
- 31 Nicolo Bruyn
- 32 Simone Cantarino
- 33 Bernardo Castello
- 34 Fabricio Castello
- 35 Giovanni Benedetto Castiglione
- 36 Francesco Chauveau
- 37 Michele Cocxie
- 38 Claudio Coello
- 39 Adriano Collaert
- 40 Giovanni Couvay
- 41 Luca Cranack
- 42 Teodoro Cruger
- 43 Teodoro Cuerenhet
- 44 van Culembac
- 45 Camillo Cungio
- 46 Corrado or Cornelio van Dalen
- 47 Giovanni Danet
- 48 Pietro Daret
- 49 Leone Darij
- 50 Carlo David
- 51 Bartolomeo Dolendo
- 52 Zaccaria Dolende
- 53 Gaspare Dughet
- 54 Alberto Durero
- 55 Adamo Elzkeimer
- 56 Episcopius
- 57 Giacinto Espinosa
- 58 Bartolomeo Esteban Murillo
- 59 Giacinto Espinosa
- 60 Bartolomeo Esteban Murillo
- 61 Guglielmo Fartorne
- 62 Francia
- 63 Agnese Frey
- 64 Giovanni Battista Galestruzzi
- 65 Filippo Galle
- 66 Natale Garnier
- 67 Antonio L Garnier
- 68 Giacinto Geminiani
- 69 Giacomo Ghein
- 70 Giorgio Ghisi
- 71 Adamo Ghisi
- 72 Giovanni Battista Ghisi
- 73 Alberto Glockentom
- 74 Enrico Golzio
- 75 Carlo Gregori
- 76 Matteo Gruvenald
- 77 Martino Heemskerken
- 78 Cornelio Hevissen
- 79 Hisbin
- 80 Agostino Hirschfogel
- 81 G. H. Hodges
- 82 Giovanni Holbein
- 83 Sigismundo Holbein
- 84 Guglielmo Hondio
- 85 Enrico Hondio
- 86 Daniello Hopfer and his brother Lamberto Hopfer
- 87 Giovanni van Huctenburg
- 88 Cristoforo Iamnitzer
- 89 Francesco Xaverio Iungwiect
- 90 Hans Kaldung
- 91 Mario Kartaro
- 92 Bartolommeo Kilian
- 93 Luca Kilian
- 94 Antonio Lafrey
- 95 Lodovico Lana
- 96 Enrico Lautensack
- 97 Hans Sebald Lautensack
- 98 Michele Leblon
- 99 Guglielmo Leewe
- 100 Hans Liefring

- 101 Renato Lochon
- 102 Guglielmo Lodge
- 103 Pietro Lombard
- 104 Michele Lucchese
- 105 Pietro Testa (il Lucchesino)
- 106 Andrea Mantegna
- 107 Giorgio Mantovano
- 108 Bernardino Mei
- 109 Met Matsys
- 110 Martino da Bologna
- 111 Cristofano Maurer
- 112 Micarino
- 113 Giuseppe Maria Mitelle
- 114 Mignot
- 115 Girolamo Mocetti
- 116 Niccolo da Modena
- 117 Luigi Morales
- 118 Paolo Moreelsen
- 119 Morto da Feltre
- 120 Moyart
- 121 Pietro Vander Nolpe
- 122 Manro Oddi
- 123 Luca d'Olanda
- 124 Vaaer Ossanen
- 125 Giacomo Palma
- 126 Antonio Palomino
- 127 Maddalena Passe o Pass
- 128 Bartolommeo Passerotti
- 129 Gregorio o Giorgio Peius
- 130 Giorgio Penez
- 131 Luca Penni
- 132 Stefano Perac
- 133 Francesco Perrier
- 134 Persecouter (or Peter van Serwouter),
- 135 Cornelio Poelemborg
- 136 Francesco Poilly
- 137 Pietro Quest
- 138 Marc'Antonio Raimondi
- 139 Silvestre da Ravenna
- 140 Marco Ravenna
- 141 Rembrandt
- 142 Gaspare Reverdino
- 143 Giuseppe Ribera
- 144 Sebastiano Ricci
- 145 Marco Ricci
- 146 Guglielmo Roger
- 147 Salvatore Rosa
- 148 Martino Rota
- 149 Guido Ruggieri
- 150 Giusto Sadeler
- 151 Hans Saenredan
- 152 Andrea Salmincio
- 153 Raffaello Sanzio
- 154 Raffaello Scaminozzi
- 155 Hans Scauflig
- 156 Giorgio Federico Schmid
- 157 Martino Schoenio or Schoen
- 158 Giovanni Schoorel (or Jan Schoorel)
- 159 Adamo Schweikart
- 160 Giovanni Sheustellin
- 161 Cornelio Sichem (or Cornelius van Sichem)
- 162 Virgilio Solis
- 163 Teodoro Starem Dietrich
- 164 Tobia Stimmer
- 165 Giovanni Cristoforo Stimmer
- 166 Vito Stossio
- 167 Cornelio Swanembourg
- 168 Antonio Tempesta
- 169 Teniers
- 170 Teodoro van Thulden
- 171 Giovanni Valdes Leal
- 172 Giovanni Luigi Valesio
- 173 Luca Valdes
- 174 Tiziano Vecellio
- 175 Antonio Vaterloo
- 176 Cesare Vecellio
- 177 Marco Veccellio
- 178 Giulio Cesare Venenti
- 179 Niccola Vicentino
- 180 Enea Vico
- 181 Francesco Villamena
- 182 Niccolo Giovanni Visscher
- 183 Giovan Giorgio Vliet
- 184 Pietro Voeriot
- 185 Michele Volgemut
- 186 Antonio Vormazia
- 187 Luca Vosterman (or Luc Wosterman)
- 188 Vovilleminot (or Wovilleminot)
- 189 Martino Zagel
