= Minoo (given name) =

Minoo (Persian: مینو meaning paradise, heaven) is a Persian given name for girls in Iran, South Asia and Central Asia, and an Indian and Urdu masculine given name. Alternate way of spelling is Minou. People with this name include:

== Female name ==
- Minoo Akhtarzand (born 1956), Iranian-Swedish civil servant
- Minoo Khaleghi (born 1985), Iranian jurist
- Minoo Lenarz (1966–2015), Iranian-German medical scientist
- Minoo Masani (1905–1998), Indian politician
- Minoo Moallem, Iranian-American academic
- Minoo Mohraz (born 1946), Iranian physician, researcher and AIDS specialist
- Minoo Mumtaz (born 1942), former Indian film actress
- Minoo Purshottam (born 1944), Indian playback singer

== Male name ==
- Minoo Merwan Engineer (1921–1997), Indian Air Force officer
- Minoo Masani (1905–1998), Indian politician

== See also ==
- Minou (given name)
- Minoh, Osaka, city in Osaka Prefecture, Japan
- Minoo Island, Iranian island in the Khuzestan province
