= Minou (given name) =

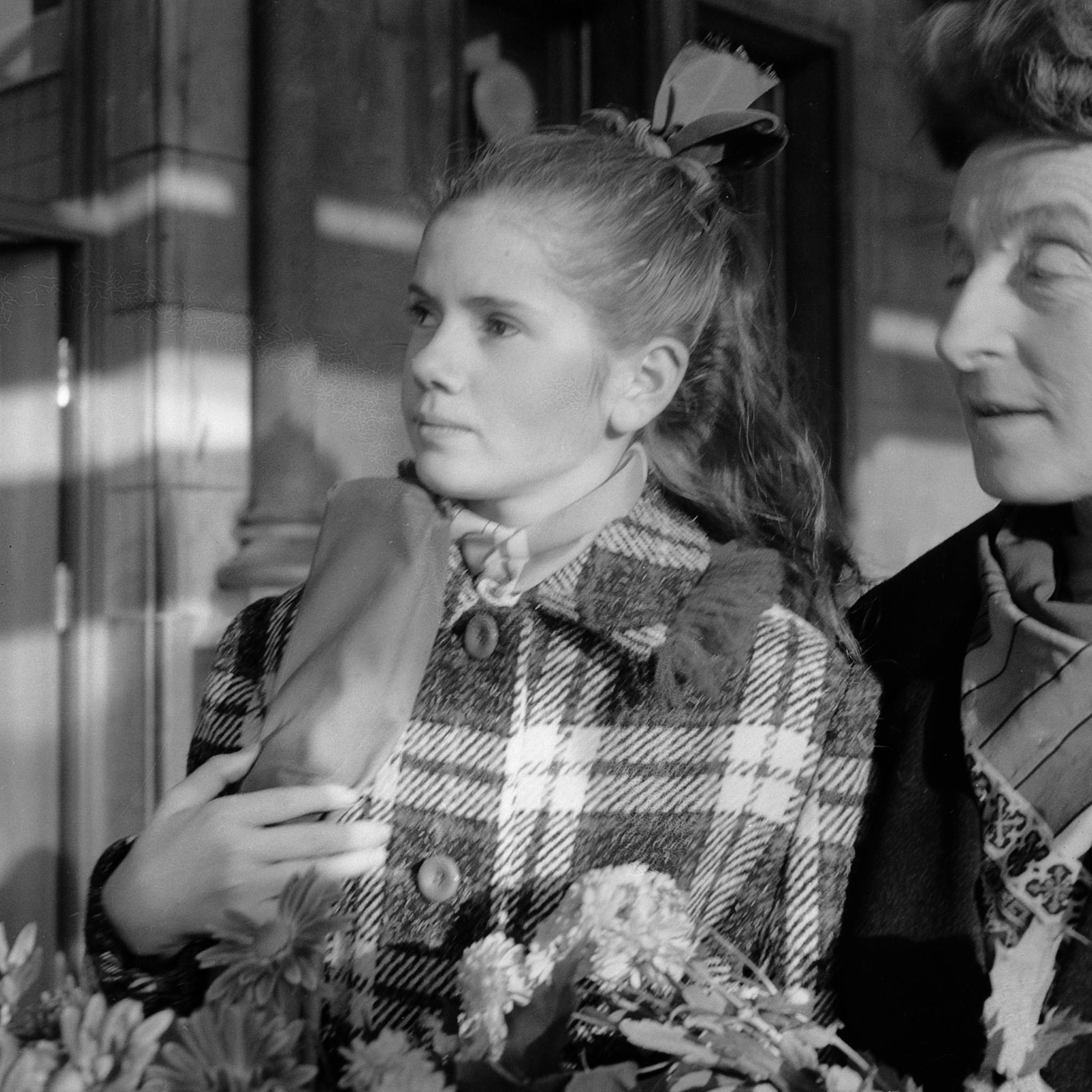
- French poet, musician and actress Minou Drouet (born 1947) and her mother, pictured in 1960.
- Gender: Feminine
- Language: French, Persian

Origin
- Meaning: French “kitten”, “pussy”; Persian “paradise”, “heaven”; diminutive of various names

Minou or Minoo is a feminine given name with multiple, unrelated origins and a hypocorism for various names. It is also a French affectionate term for a kitten and a French vernacular slang term for vulva or vagina, akin to the double meaning of the English “pussy”. Alternate spelling Minoo (Persian: مینو) is a Persian feminine given name meaning “paradise”, “heaven” in use in Iran, South Asia and Central Asia. Minou is also a French surname with different origins, sometimes originating as a spelling variation of other French surnames such as Mignot, Minaud, Minot and variants.

== Women ==
- Minou Drouet (born Marie-Noëlle in 1947), French poet, musician, and actress
- Minou Reeves (born 1946), Iranian writer, translator, and former politician
- Minou Tavárez Mirabal (born Minerva in 1956), Dominican philologist, professor and politician
- Minou Toussaint (born 1983), Dutch cricketer
