= Alland'Huy-et-Sausseuil =

- Commune
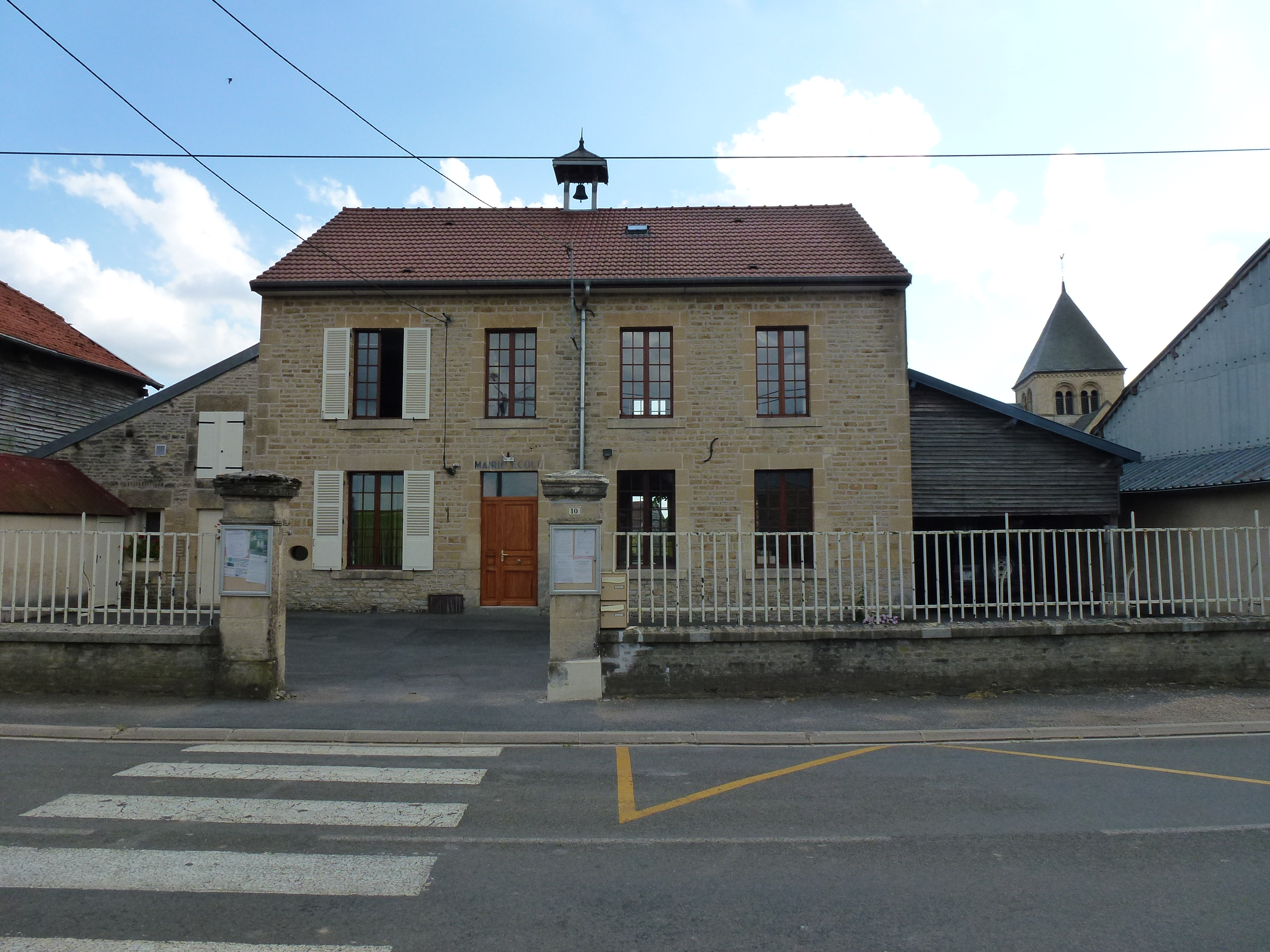
- The Town Hall and School

- Coat of arms
- Location of Alland'Huy-et-Sausseuil
- Location within France Location within Grand Est
- Coordinates: 49°30′48″N 4°33′23″E
- Country: France
- Region: Grand Est
- Department: Ardennes
- Arrondissement: Vouziers
- Canton: Attigny
- Intercommunality: Crêtes Préardennaises

Government
  - Mayor (2020–2026): Cédric Paté
- Area^{1}: 8.71 km^{2} (3.36 sq mi)
- Elevation: 100 m (330 ft)
- Highest elevation: 121 m (397 ft)
- Lowest elevation: 77 m (253 ft)
- Population (2023): 272
  - Density: 31.2/km^{2} (80.9/sq mi)
- Time zone: UTC+01:00 (CET)
  - Summer (DST): UTC+02:00 (CEST)
- INSEE/Postal code: 08006 /08130
- ^{1} French Land Register data, which excludes lakes, ponds, glaciers > 1 km^{2} (0.386 sq mi or 247 acres) and river estuaries.

Alland'Huy-et-Sausseuil (French pronunciation: [alɑ̃dɥi e sosœj]) is a commune in the Ardennes department in the Grand Est region of northern France.

== Geography ==
Alland'Huy-et-Sausseuil is located some 10 km east of Rethel and 35 km south-west of Charleville-Mézières. The D30 road from Amagne to Écordal passes through the northern part of the commune. The village can be accessed off the D30 via the D14 which passes through the village then continues east to Charbogne. There is also the D43 road from just south of Écordal which passes south through the commune to Saulces-Champenoises. A branch railway line passes through the commune from Lucquy station in the west to the station just south of the village and the line continues south-east to Attigny station. Apart from the village the commune consists entirely of farmland.

La Foivre stream flows south through the eastern part of the commune and continues to join the Aisne south of the commune. There are several other small streams in the east of the commune and the Ruisseau de Saulces in the west.

== History ==
This commune was occupied by the Germans during the First World War and again during the Second. The village was partially destroyed.

On 6 April 1944 six people were arrested on the Chesnois farm and deported for helping airmen of the U.S. Air Force, whose aircraft were shot down, to evade capture by the Germans.

=== Heraldry ===
Arms of Alland'Huy-et-Sausseuil	Blazon: Party per fesse, in chief argent saltire of gules charged with a lion of Or, in base azure a crescent of Or between two jugs argent handled and spouts facing.

== Administration ==
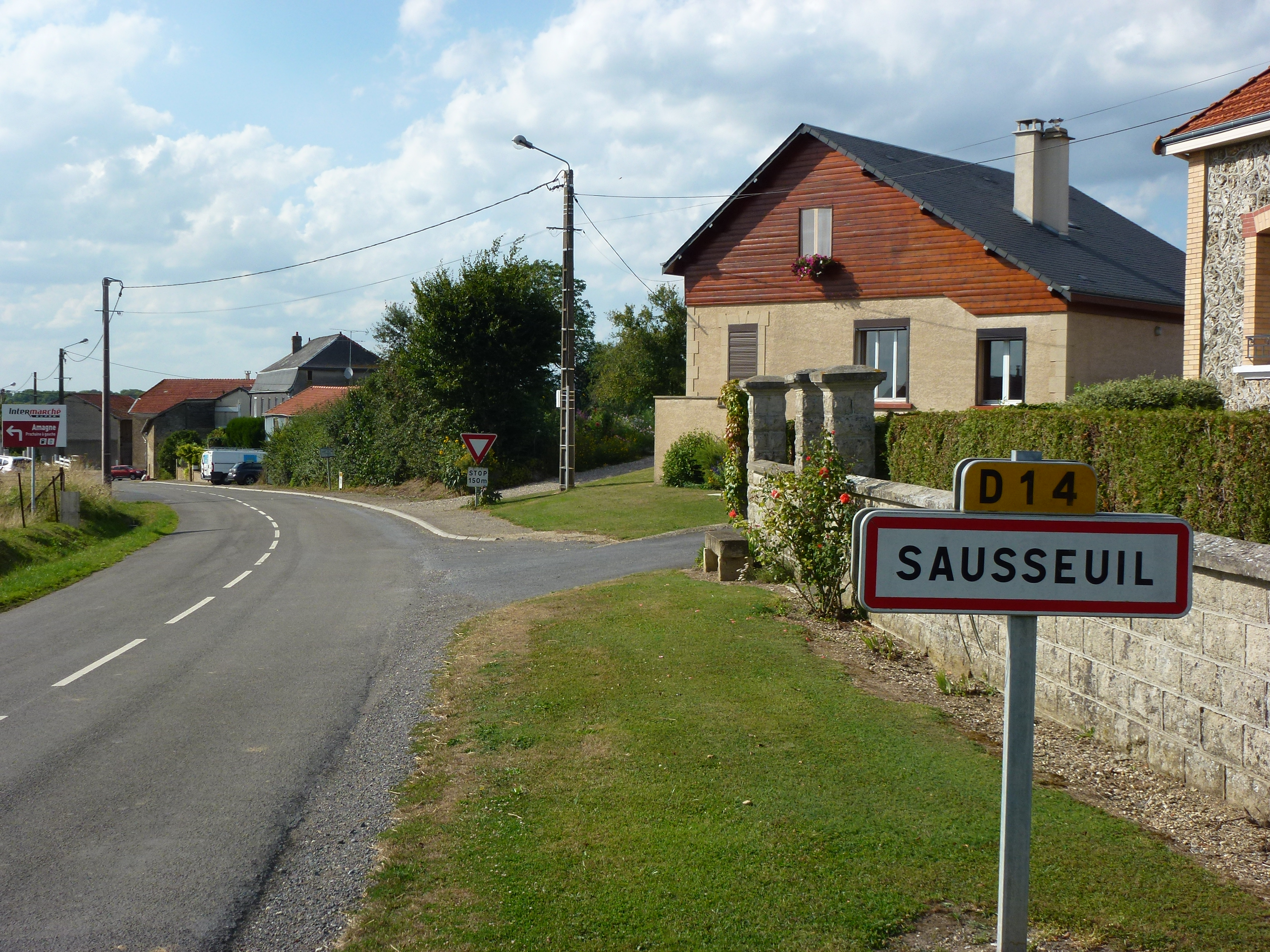
Entrance to Sausseuil

List of Successive Mayors

From	To	Name	Party	Position
1864	1886	Jean Auguste Pierlot		
1889	1892	Michel Alphonse Coche		
1902	1907	Jean Louis Cyrille Edmond Thille		
1913	?	Jean Baptiste Elie GÉNIN		
1931	?	Raoul Etienne Coche		
2001	2008	Nadine Pamart		
2008	2011	Laurent Danloup		
2011	Current	Cédric Paté		Farmer

== Population ==
Historical population
Year	Pop.	±% p.a.
1968	303	—
1975	265	−1.90%
1982	242	−1.29%
1990	217	−1.35%
1999	215	−0.10%
2007	237	+1.23%
2012	262	+2.03%
2017	245	−1.33%
2023	272	+1.76%
Source: INSEE

== Sites and Monuments ==
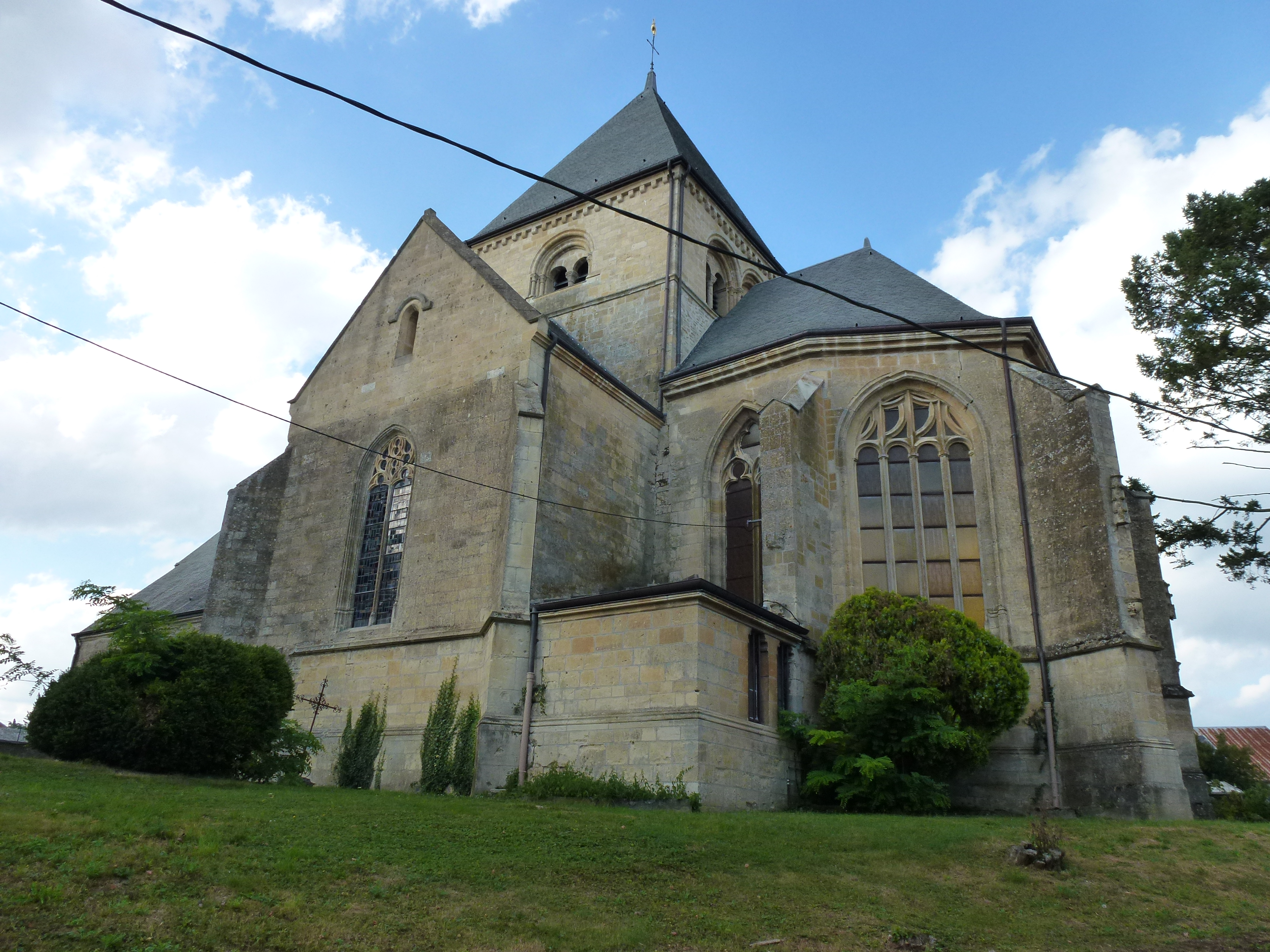
The Church of Saint Catherine

- The Church of Saint Catherine (12th century) is a Romanesque church located in the heart of the village. The building was listed as a historical monument in 1986.
- Some beautiful fortified farms, mostly made of brick.
- A Chateau in the hamlet of Sausseuil.

== Notable people linked to the commune ==
- Charles Batteux (1713-1780) was a clergyman, Translator, Latin scholar, author of scholastic books. Professor of rhetoric. Held a Chair of Greek and Latin philosophy. Member of the Academy of Sciences in 1754.
- The French Resistance fighters arrested by the Gestapo at the Chesnois farm in 1944: the Fromentin family (Georges, Georgette, Jean, Lucienne), Paul Sagnet, Blanche Deloche-Sagnet, Charles Lambert, Robert Couvin.

== See also ==
- Communes of the Ardennes department
