= Amagne =

- Commune
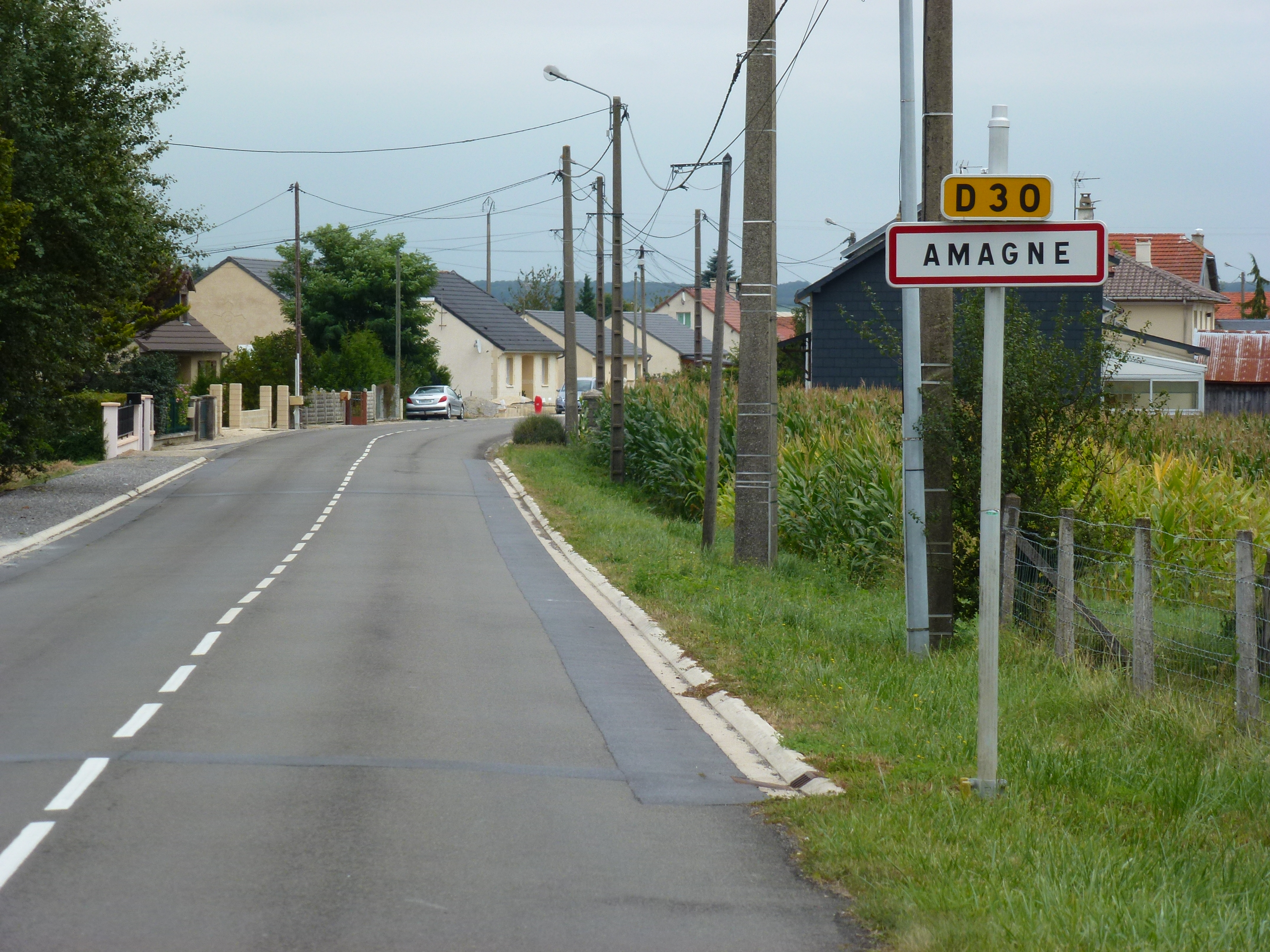
- Entry to the village

- Coat of arms
- Location of Amagne
- Location within France Location within Grand Est
- Coordinates: 49°31′05″N 4°30′06″E
- Country: France
- Region: Grand Est
- Department: Ardennes
- Arrondissement: Rethel
- Canton: Rethel
- Intercommunality: Pays Rethélois

Government
  - Mayor (2020–2026): Laurent Destrumelle
- Area^{1}: 9.32 km^{2} (3.60 sq mi)
- Elevation: 86.72 m (284.5 ft)
- Highest elevation: 100 m (330 ft)
- Lowest elevation: 75 m (246 ft)
- Population (2023): 814
  - Density: 87.3/km^{2} (226/sq mi)
- Time zone: UTC+01:00 (CET)
  - Summer (DST): UTC+02:00 (CEST)
- INSEE/Postal code: 08008 /08300
- ^{1} French Land Register data, which excludes lakes, ponds, glaciers > 1 km^{2} (0.386 sq mi or 247 acres) and river estuaries.

Amagne (French pronunciation: [amaɲ]) is a commune in the Ardennes department in the Grand Est region of northern France.

== Economic and Cultural Development ==
The village has developed in particular thanks to its commercial but above all cultural infrastructures. Moreover, it favours sporting plurality and could envisage the creation of a new football pitch. In addition, it has a railway station that runs between Reims and Metz via the Intercités trains.

From an economic point of view, it only has an unemployment rate of 8.5% in 2017.

== Geography ==
Amagne is located some 40 km south-west of Charleville-Mézières and 40 km north-east of Rheims. It can be accessed by the D30 road running east from Rethel to the village then continuing east to Ecordal. Route D21 also comes from Novy-Chevrieres in the north-west and continues towards Attigny in the south-east. Route D45 also comes to the commune from Ambly-Fleury in the south-west. A railway from Rethel to Charleville-Mézières passes through the north-west of the commune and there is a branch line from Amagne-Lucquy through the village and continuing east to the next station at Alland'Huy-et-Sausseuil but there is no station in the commune. The station at Amagne-Lucquey just outside the commune in the west off the D21 road serves the commune.

The Aisne river forms the southern boundary of the commune. The Ruisseau de Saulces passes through the village and a number of streams flow into this stream. Apart from the village the commune is entirely farmland. There are no other hamlets in the commune.

== Administration ==
Jean-Baptiste Demaret (1793-1884) became mayor of Amagne in 1830 and remained so for 42 years. He was awarded the Legion of Honour.

List of Successive Mayors of Amagne

From	To	Name
1940	1942	Désiré Visoli
1942	1944	Firmin Manil
1944	1953	Goffart
1953	1967	Louis Jason
1967	1995	Paul Schmitt
1995	2008	Pierre-Gérard Braga
2008	Current	Laurent Destrumelle

== Population ==
The inhabitants of the commune are known as Aquamagniens or Aquamagniennes in French.

Historical population
Year	Pop.	±% p.a.
1968	744	—
1975	645	−2.02%
1982	572	−1.70%
1990	612	+0.85%
1999	705	+1.58%
2007	689	−0.29%
2012	714	+0.72%
2017	725	+0.31%
2023	814	+1.95%
Source: INSEE

== Culture and heritage ==
The Church of Saint Martin (13th century) is classified as an historical monument. Some of the stained glass windows date from the 13th century and it has interesting furniture from the 17th and 18th centuries. The church contains two items that are registered as historical objects:

- A Bas-relief (17th century)
- An Altar, 3 Retables, and 2 Bas-reliefs (18th century)
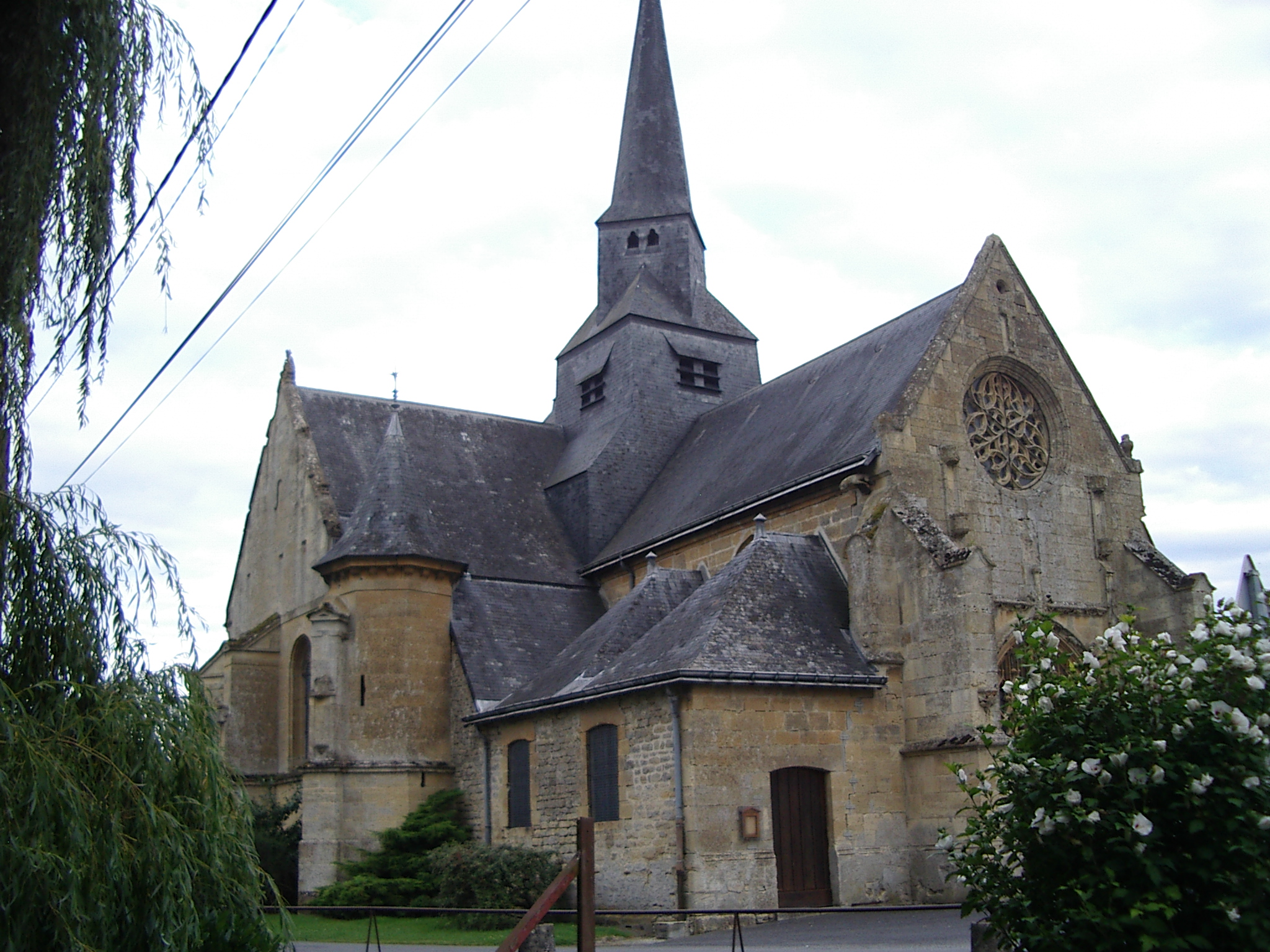
Church of Saint-Martin

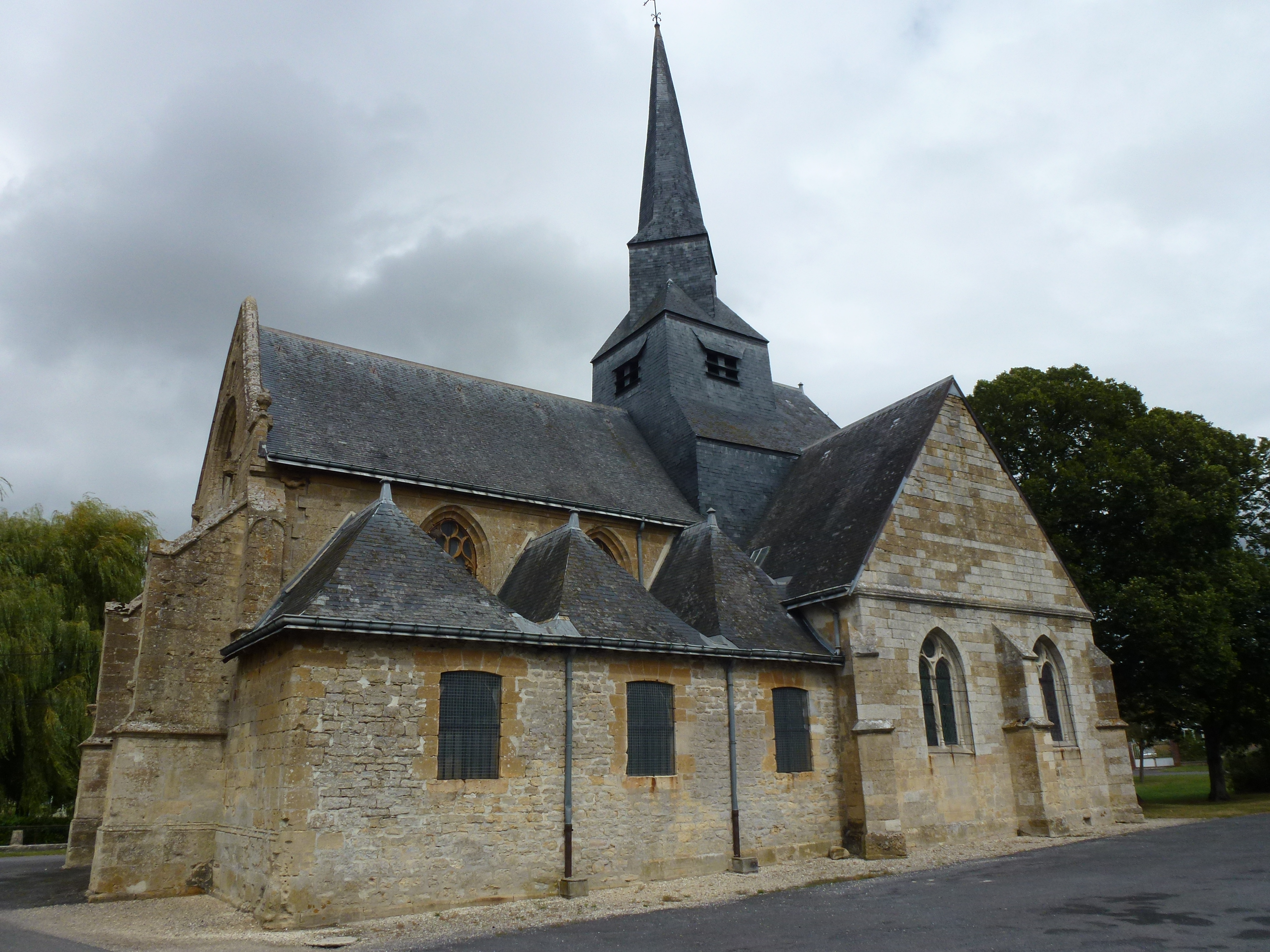
Side view of the church

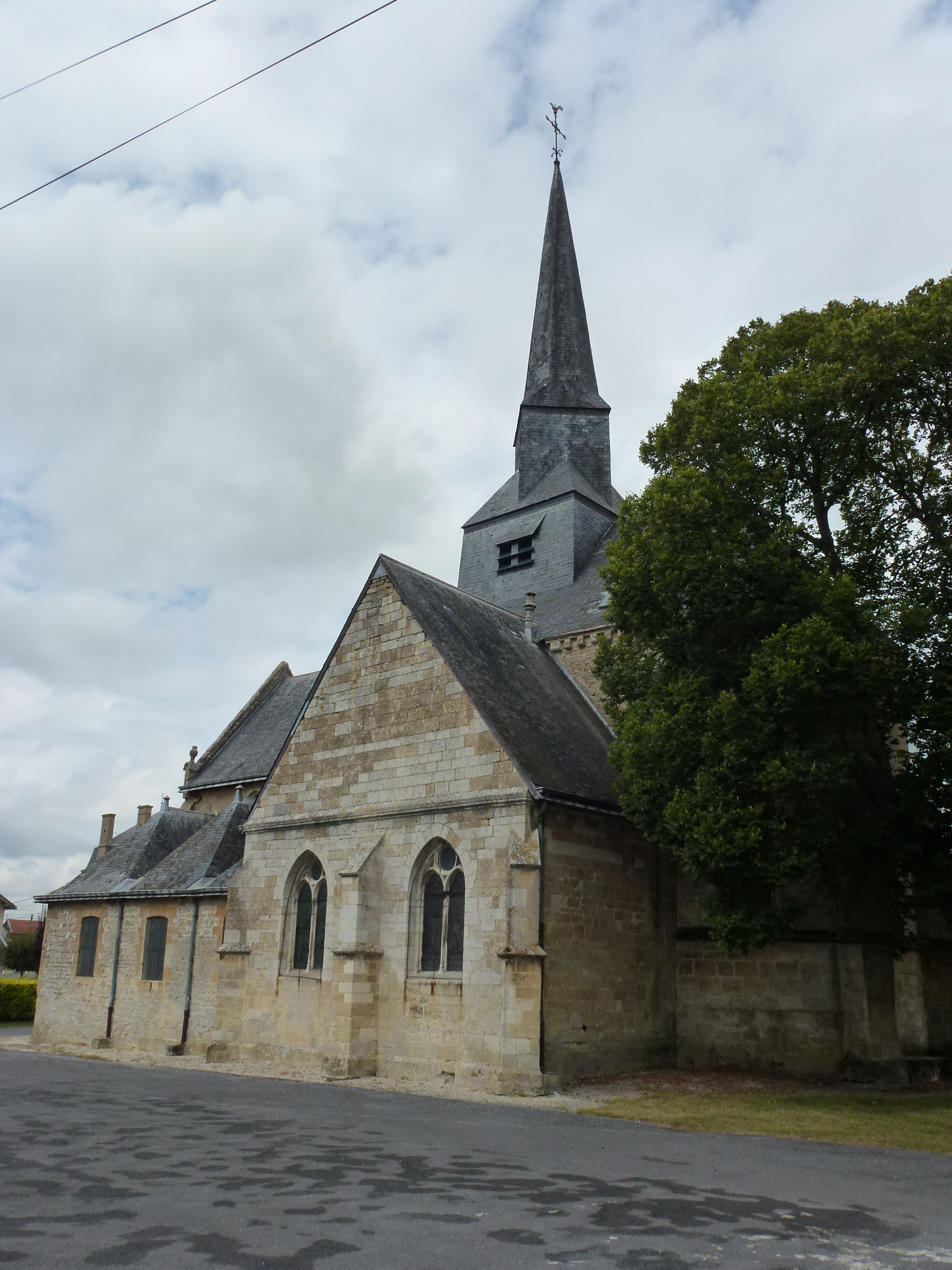
Angular view of the church

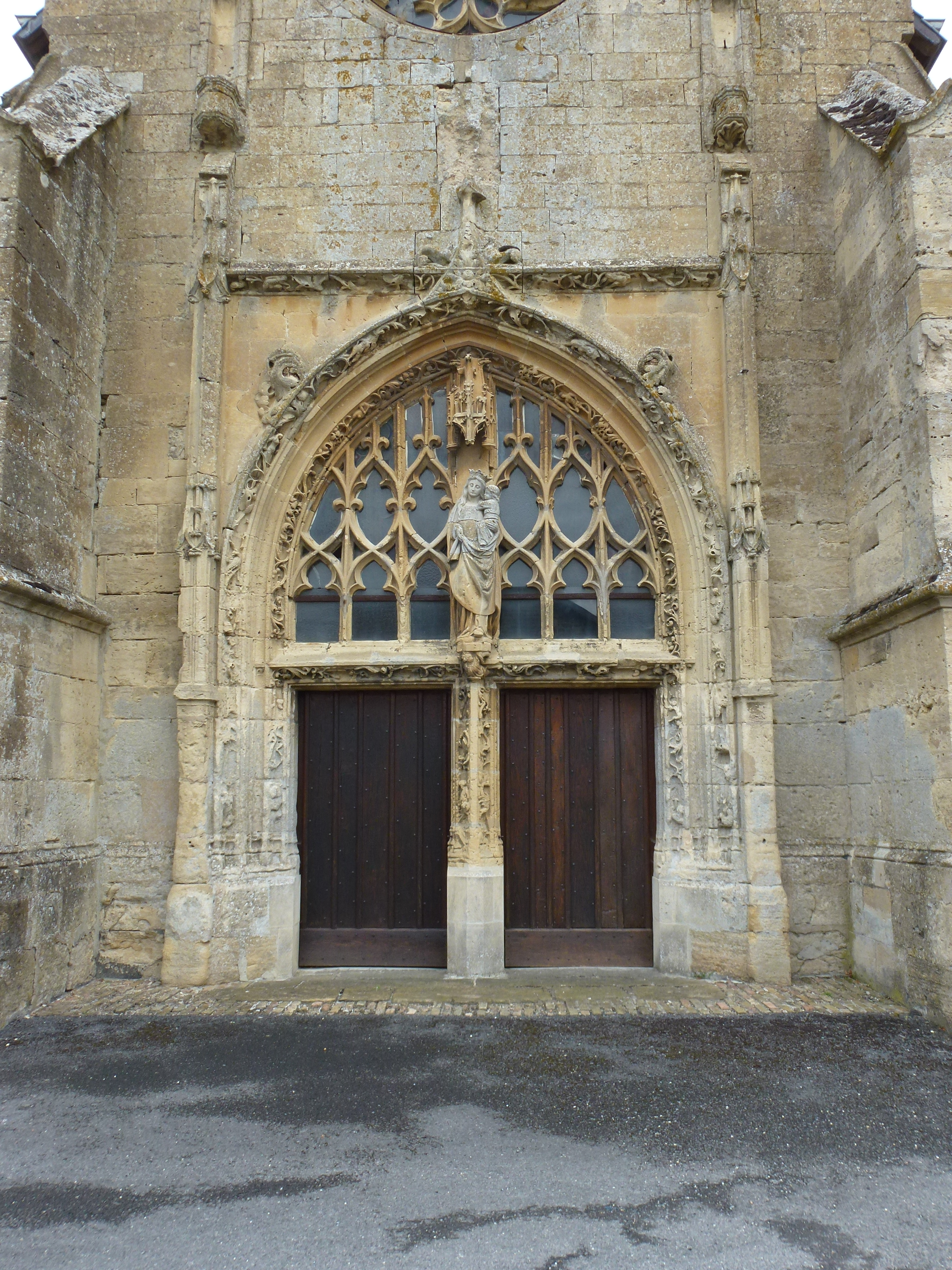
Entry to the church

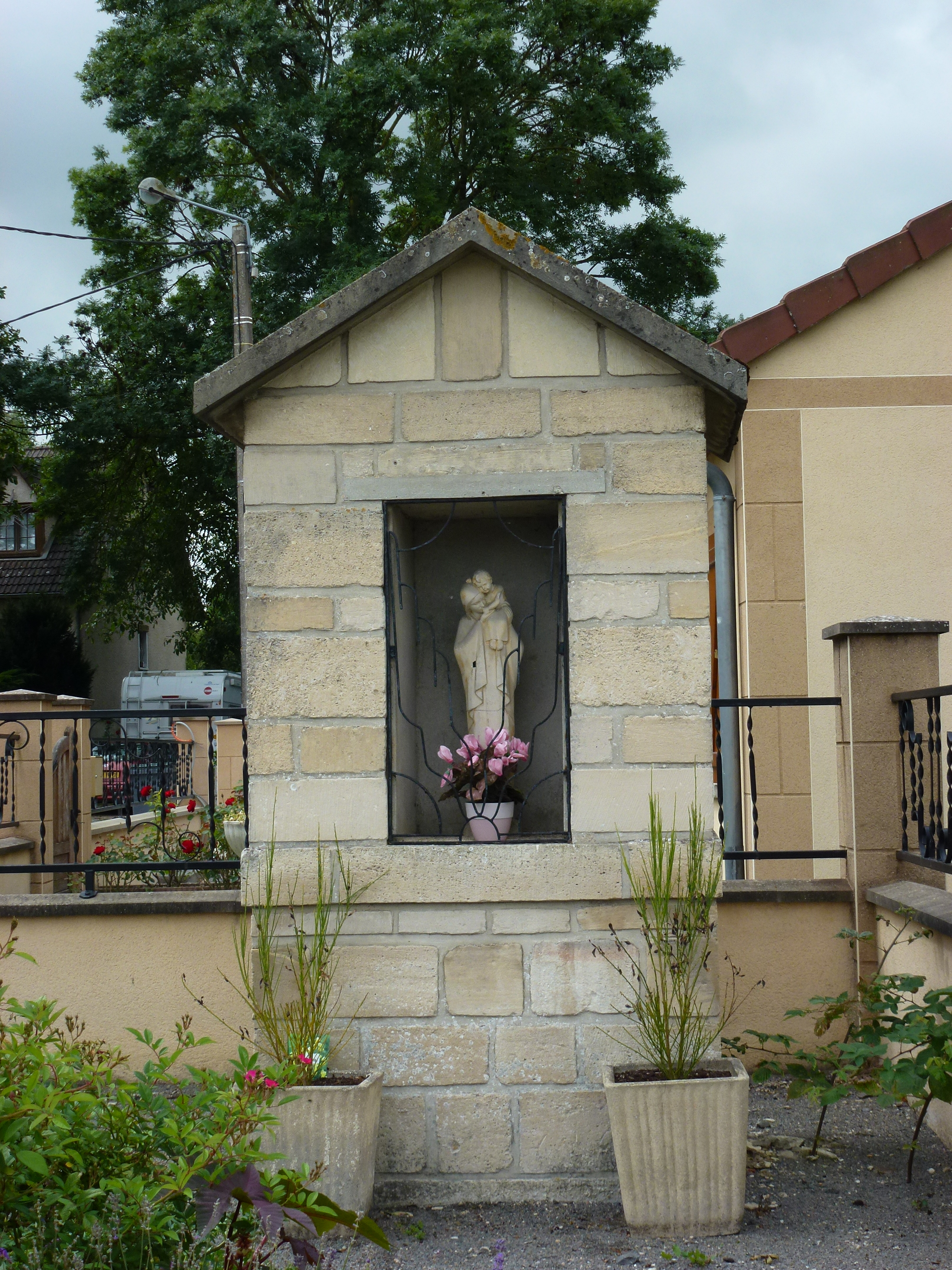
Oratory at the church

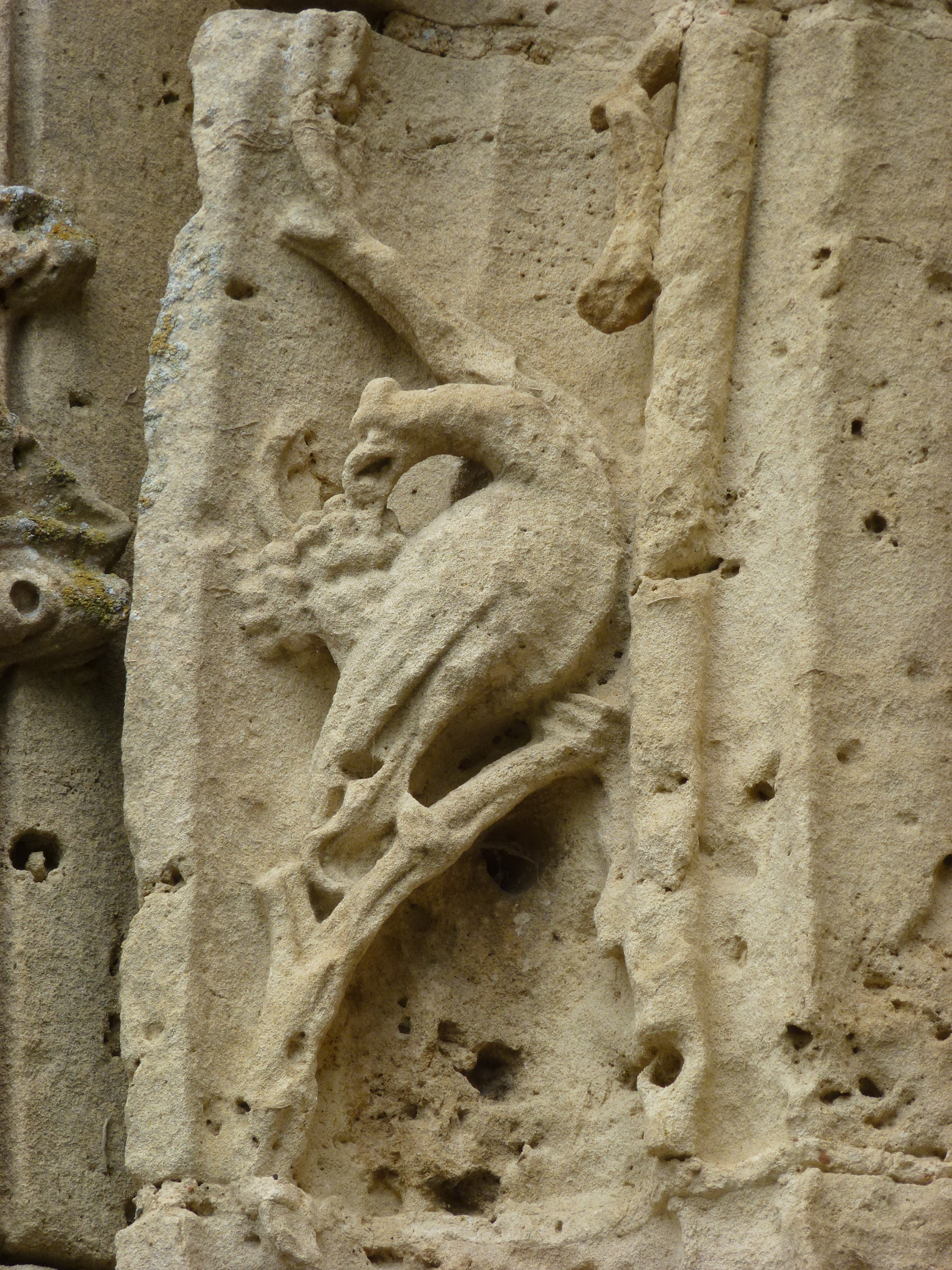
Church Sculpture detail

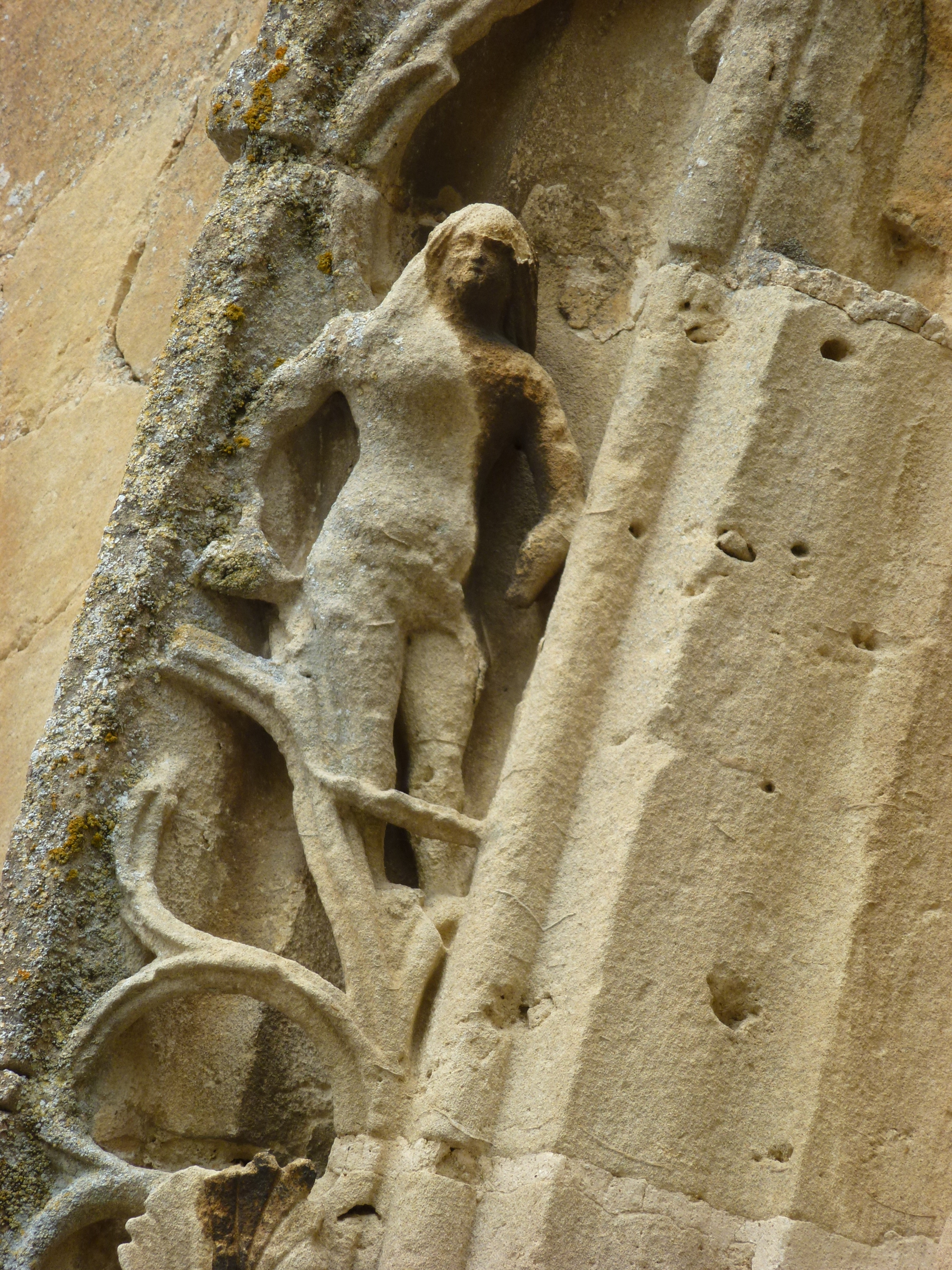
Church Sculpture detail

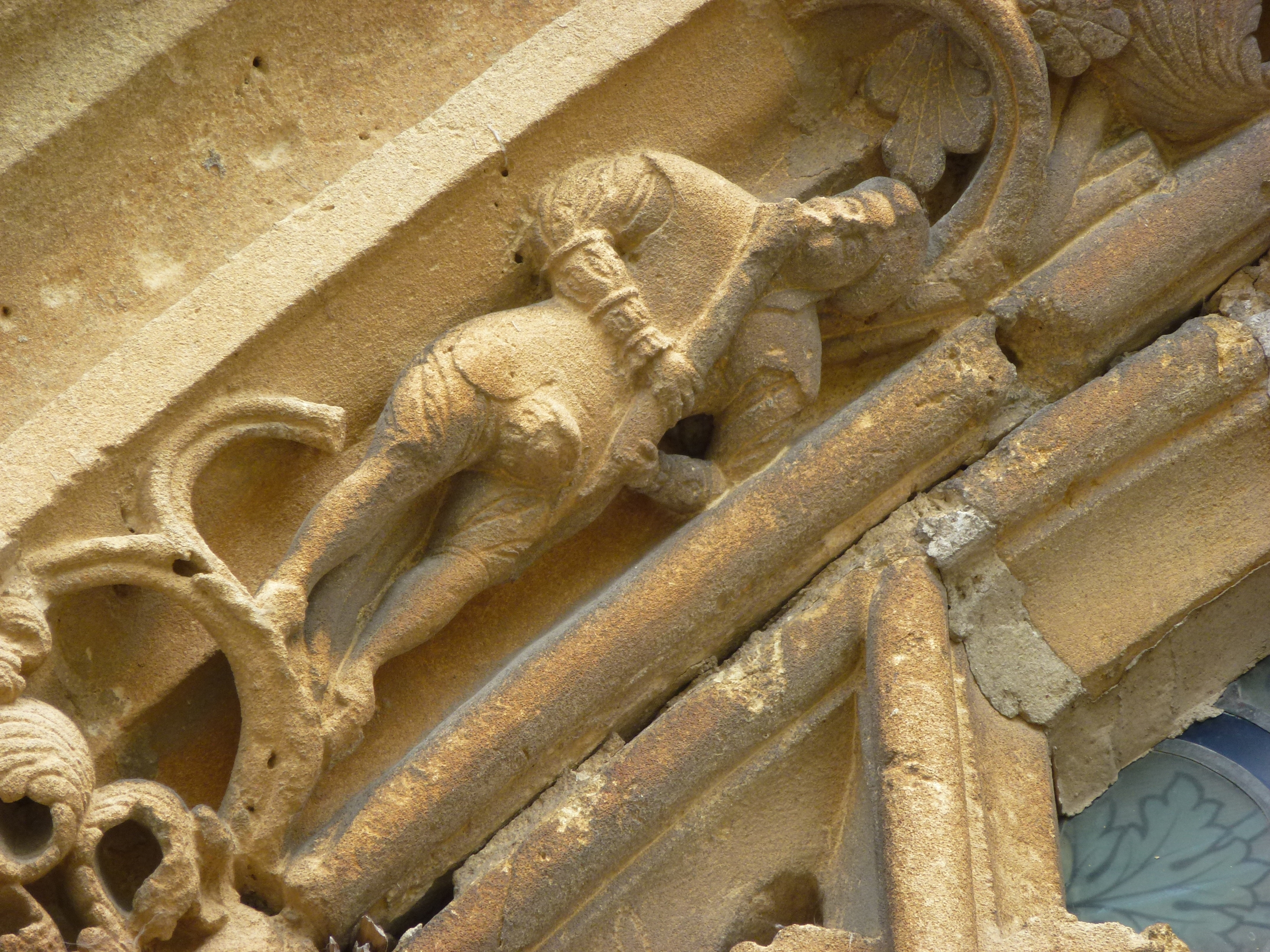
Church Sculpture detail

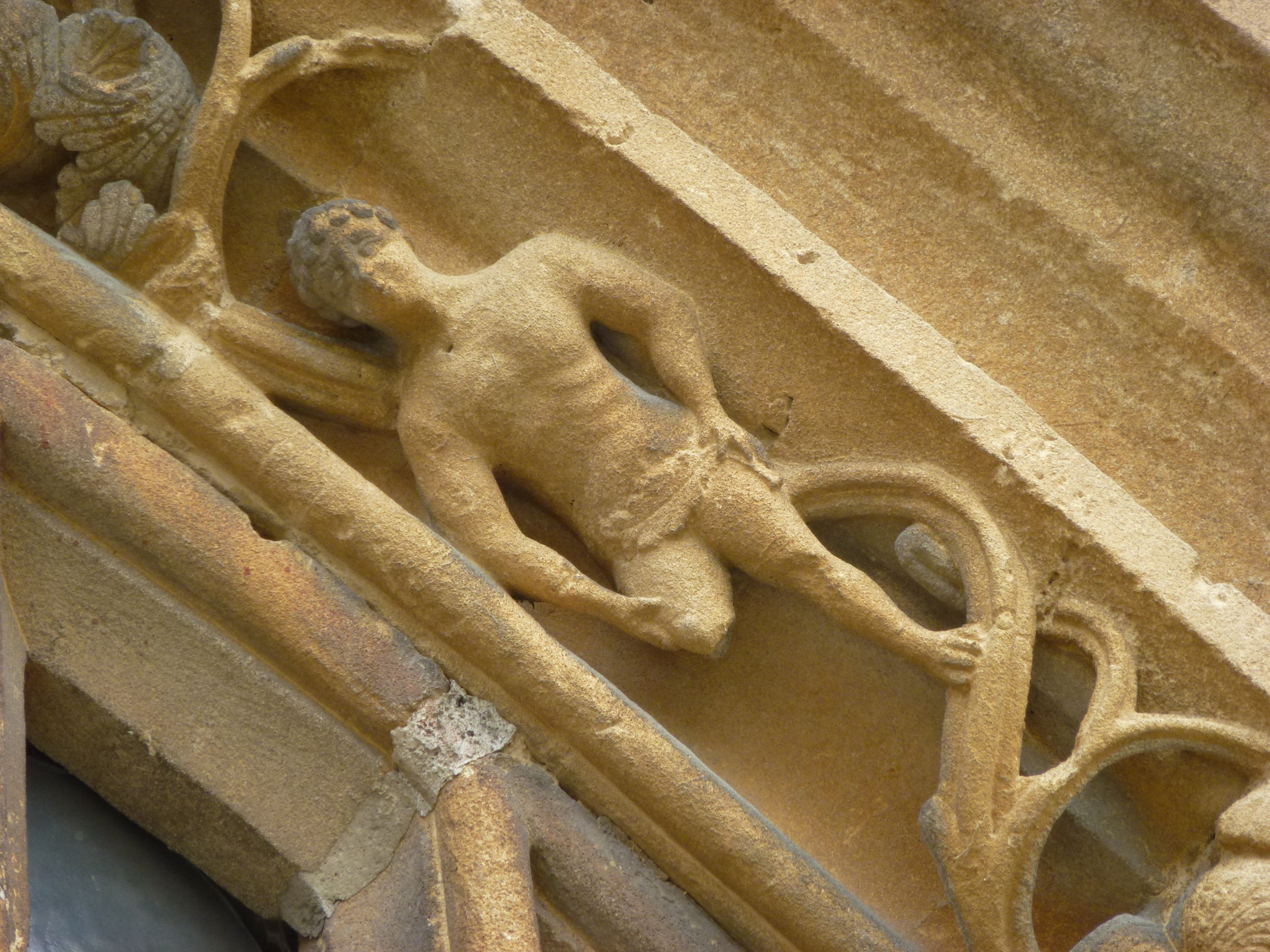
Church Sculpture detail

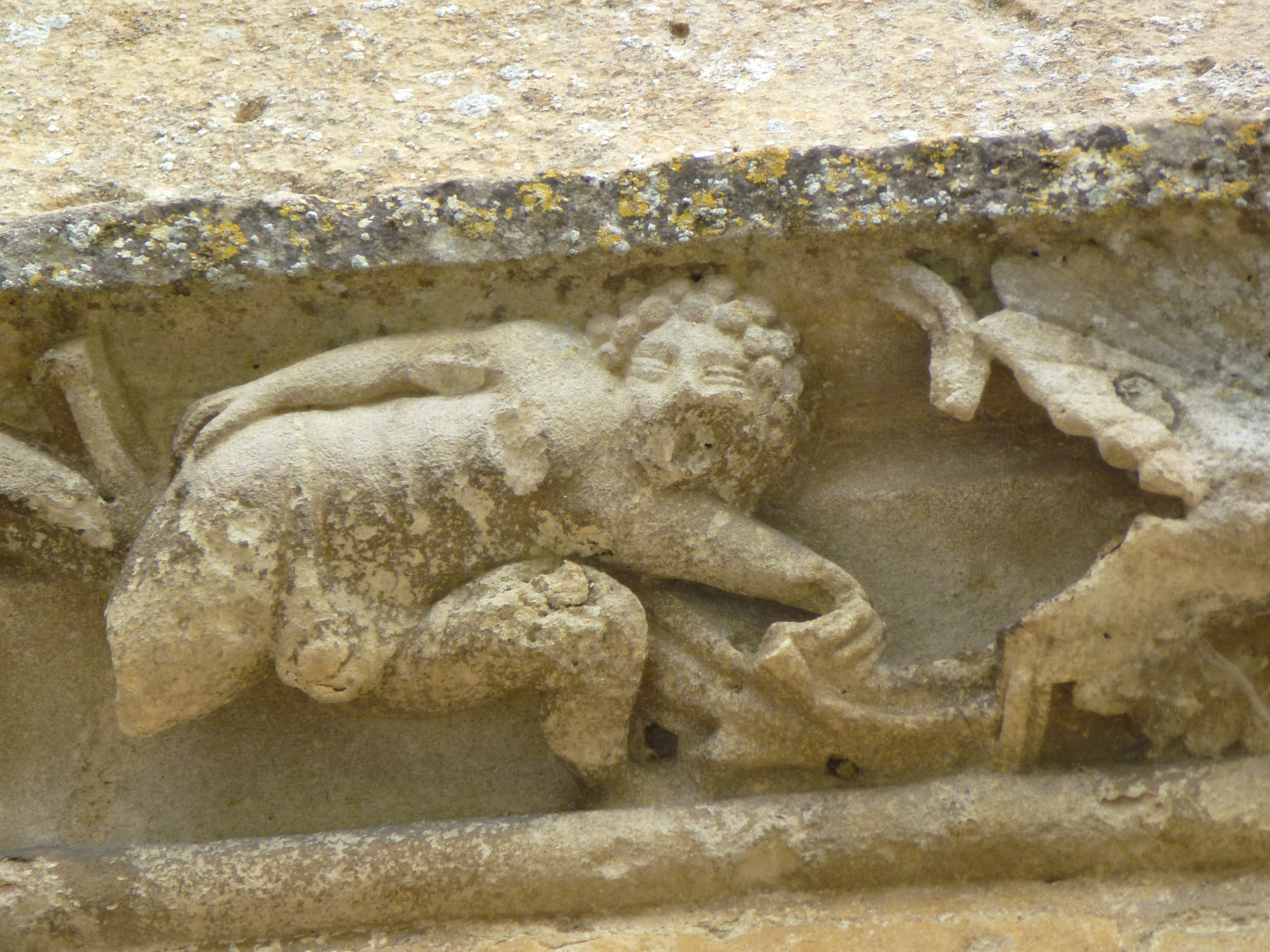
Church Sculpture detail

=== Sights in the Commune ===
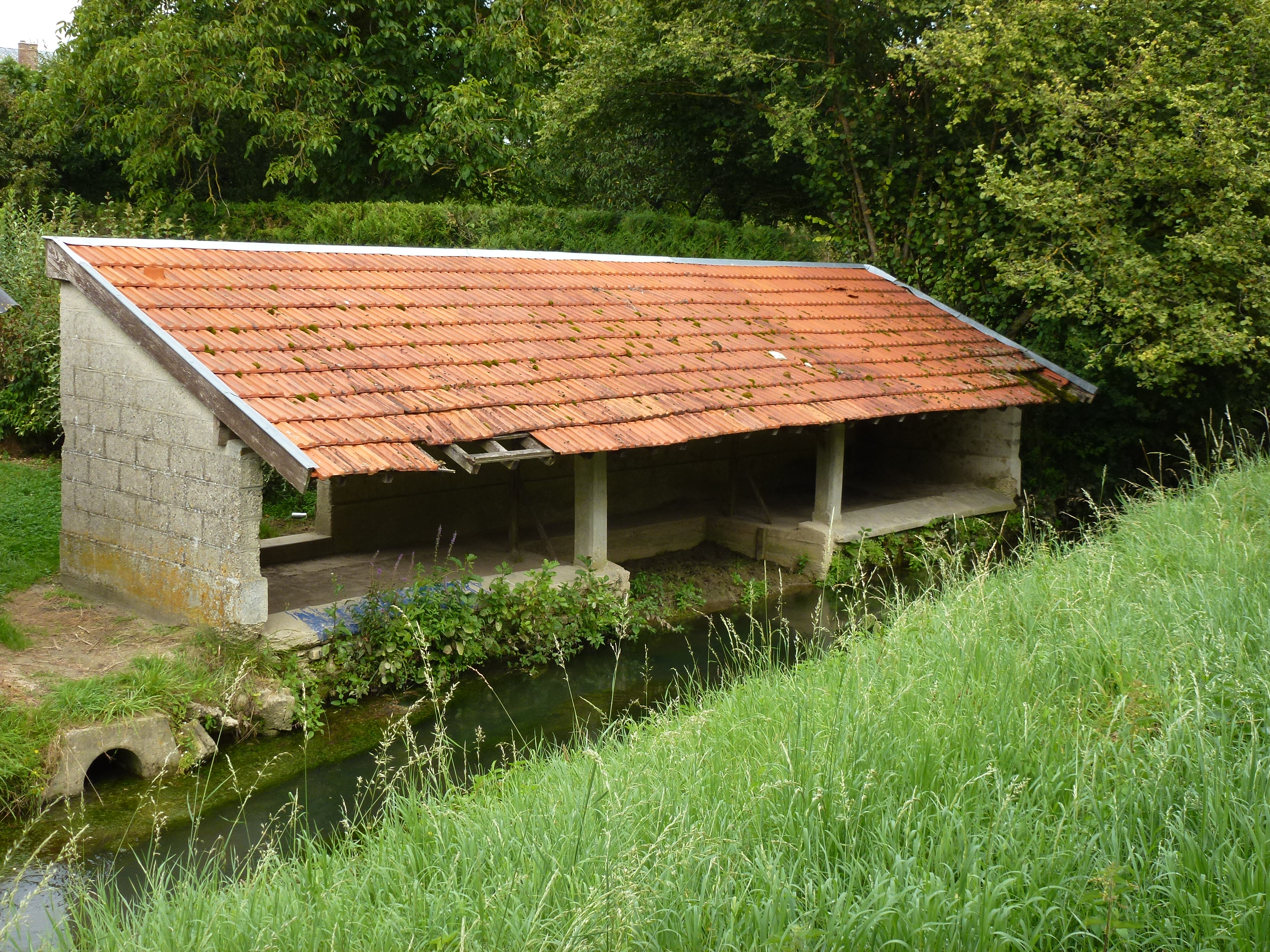
The Lavoir

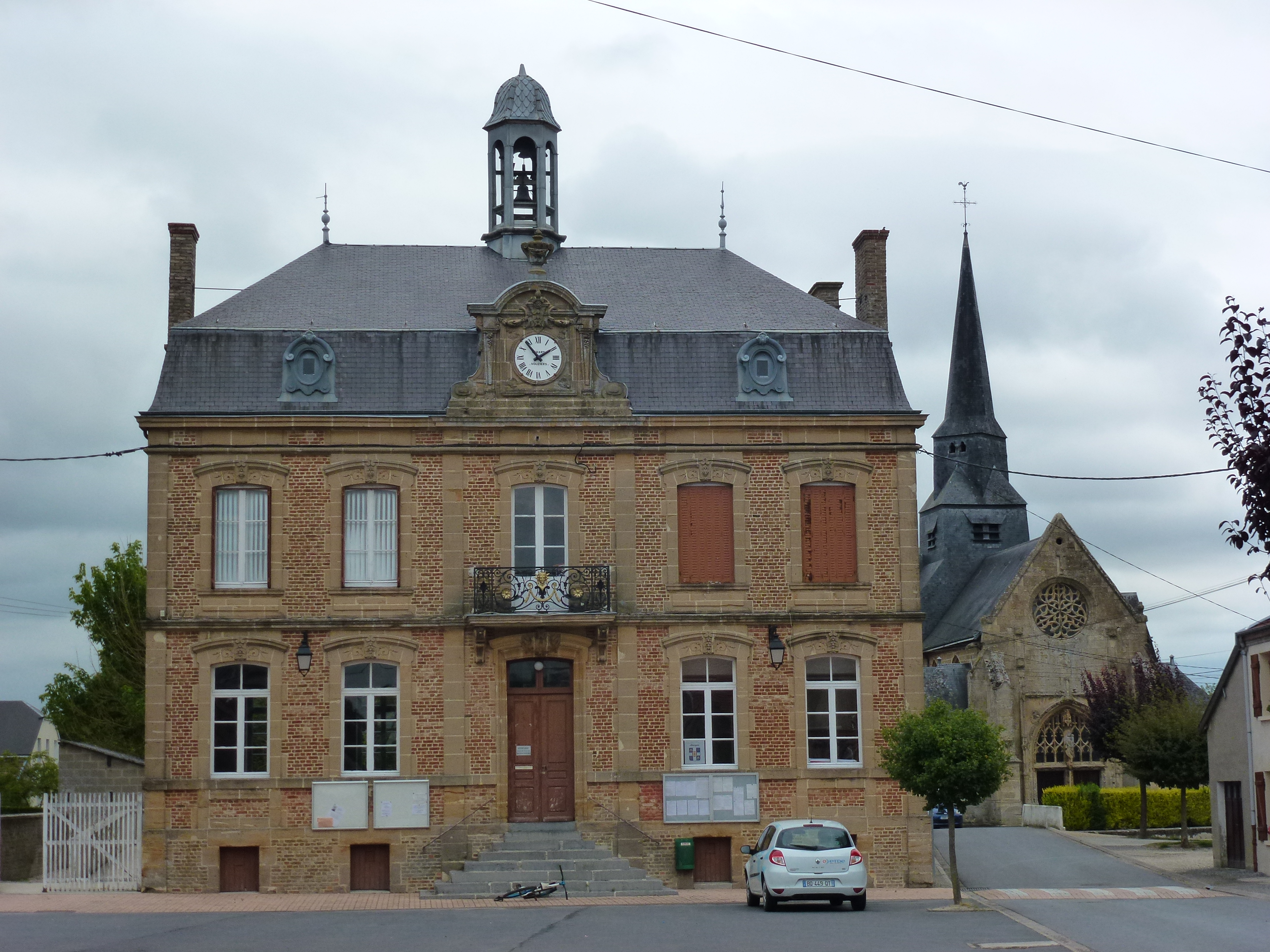
The Town Hall

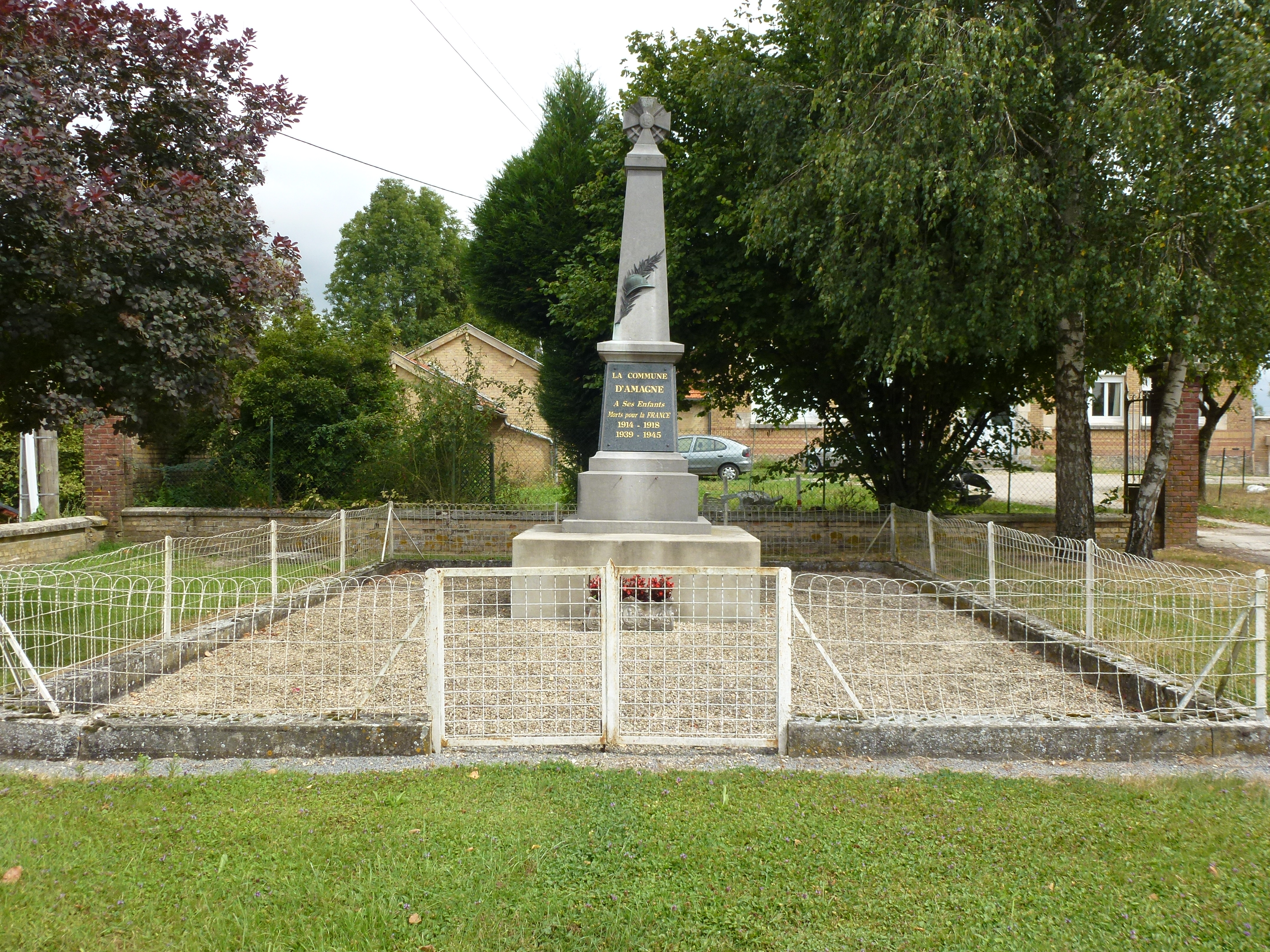
The War Memorial

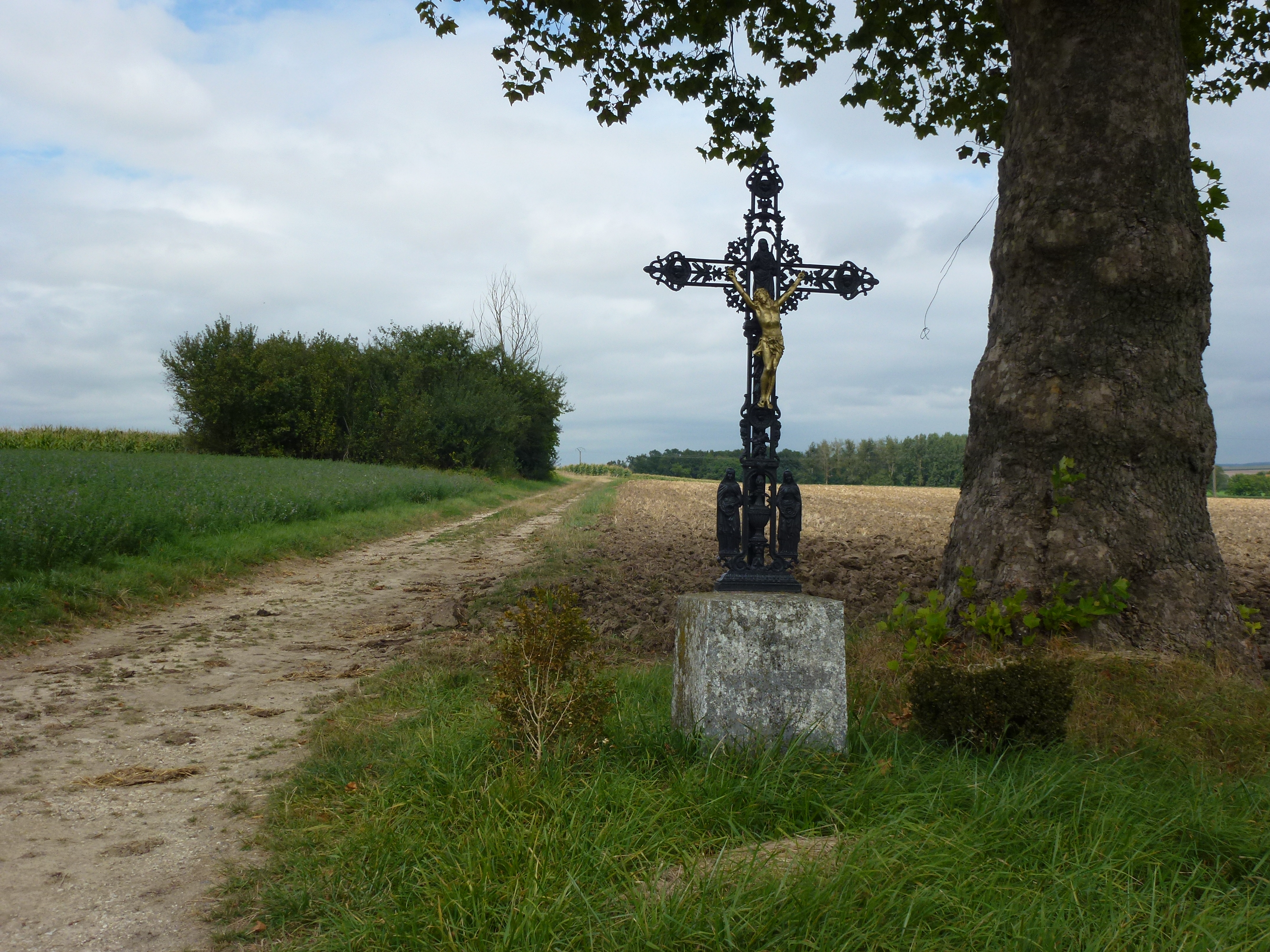
Roadside Crosses

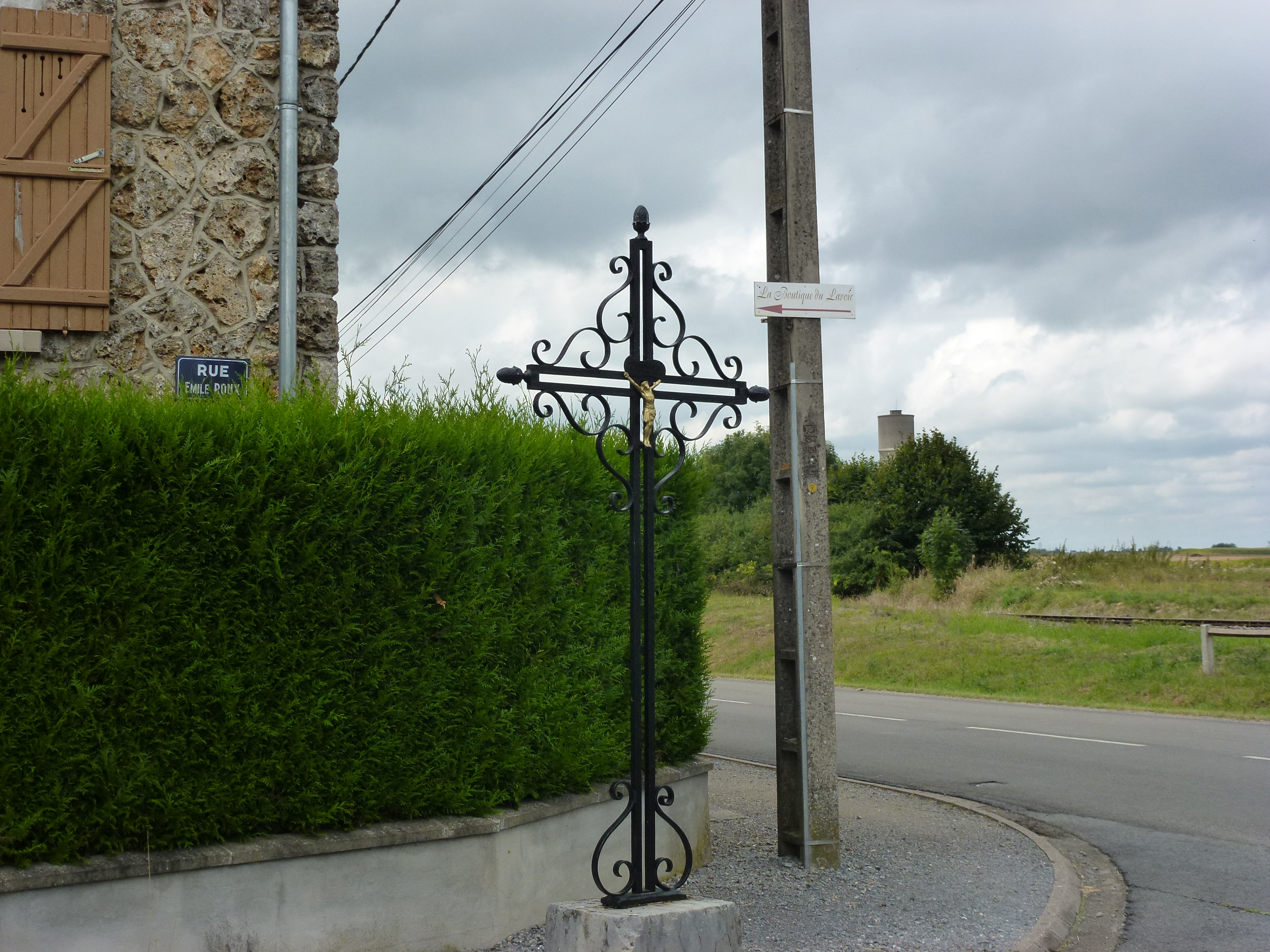
Roadside Cross

== See also ==
- Communes of the Ardennes department
