= Natale Bonifacio =

Venetian engraver

Natale Bonifacio de Sebenico (1537/38, in Šibenik – 23 February 1592, Šibenik) was a Venetian producer of engravings and woodcuts in Rome, where he lived and worked for most of his life. His plates are principally etchings. In 1590, he engraved for a book composed by Domenico Fontana, architect to Pope Sixtus V, concerning the laborious engineering of the moving and erection of the Vatican obelisk.

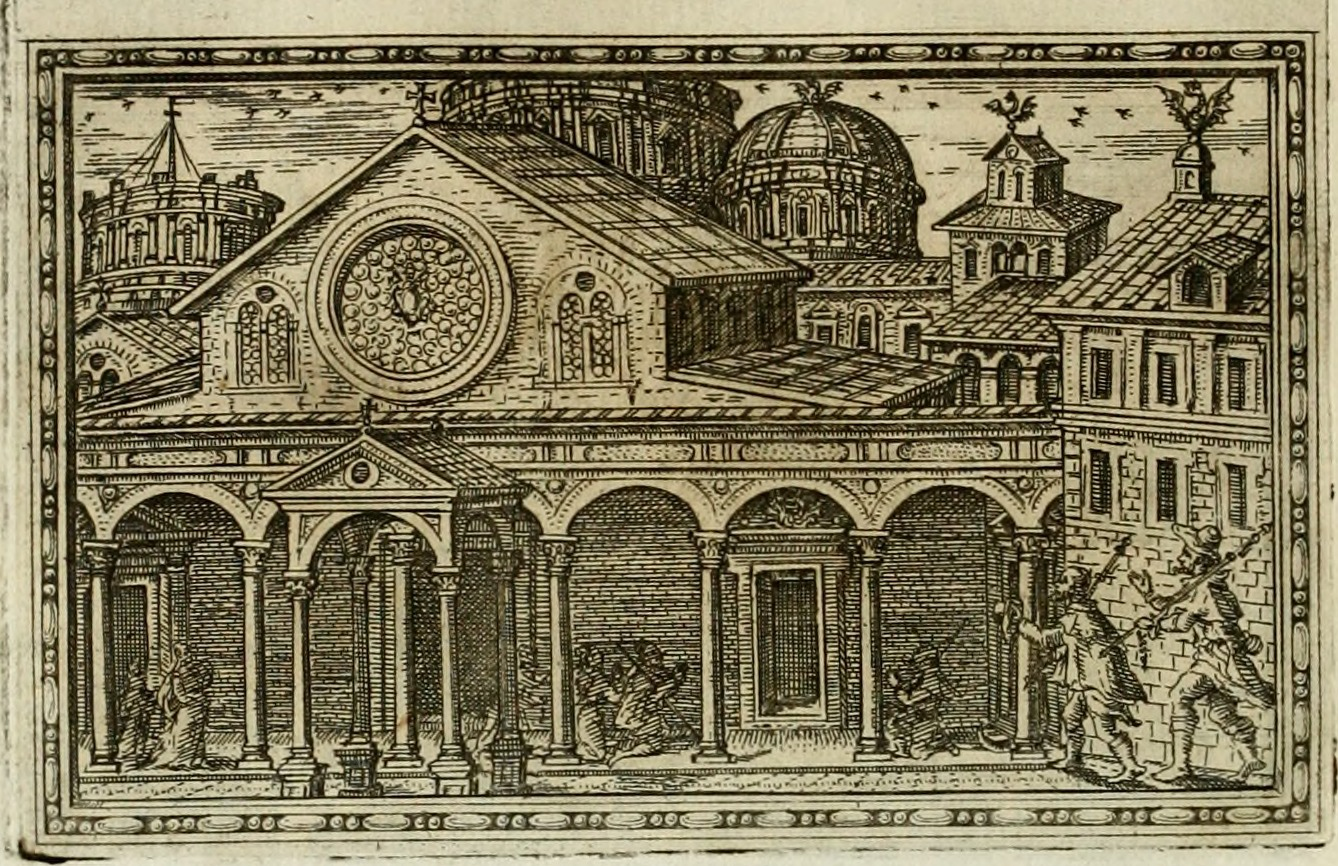
Delle allvsioni, by Natale Bonifacio

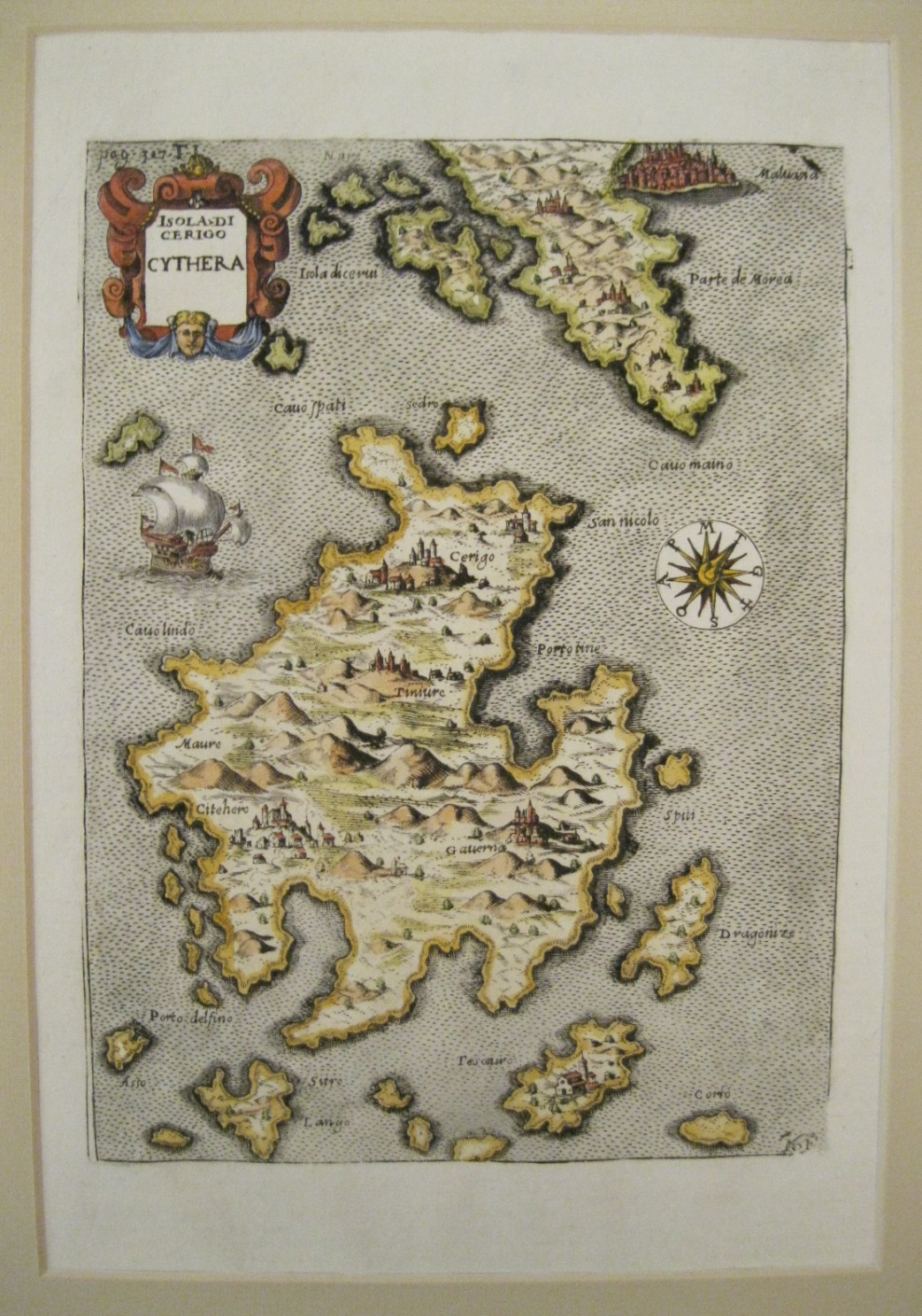
Late 16th-century map by Natale Bonifacio

== Life ==
Bonifacio was born in Sebenico (modern-day Šibenik, Croatia) to his father Jerome, a native of the noble family of Capua. Very little is known of the early years of his life. In the 1570s, he is documented as travelling to Venice, where he published some maps. In 1575, in conjunction with the opening of the Holy Year, he moved to Rome. Over the next few years, his fame and popularity grew.

On 5 July 1579, Bonifacio was received into the congregation of Saint Jerome of the Croats (degli Schiavoni), becoming the guardian on 10 April 1580, a mayor auditor in 1582, and a chamberlain in 1583. The next year - due to some errors in the compilation of the accounts - he was forced to repay the damage affecting copper by Christmas of 1586 of two images of St. Jerome for the candles to be offered to the pope on the feast of Candlemas. In 1589, Boniface was the second guardian of the Brotherhood when he had to go back to Sebenico to assist his sick mother, leaving his wife Maddalena in Rome with their children. In 1590, he engraved for a book composed by Domenico Fontana, architect to Pope Sixtus V, concerning the laborious engineering of the moving and erection of the Vatican obelisk.

He died on 23 February 1592.

== Exhibitions ==
From March to April 2003, an exhibition in the Print Department of the Croatian Academy of Arts and Sciences in Zagreb focused on works by Bonifacio and by another native of Sebenico, Martino Rota, held in Croatian collections.

== Sources ==
- Decreti delle Congregazioni dal 1578 al 1591 (knjiga IV.) i Decreti delle Congregazioni dal 1599 al 1610 (knjiga VI.) u arhivu Zavoda sv. Jeronima u Rimu
- F. Brulliot, Dictionnaire des monogrammes ..., Munchen, 1832.
- I. Kukuljević-Sakcinski, Slovnik umjetnikah jugoslavenskih, Zagreb, 1859.
- F. Cupilli, Opera ignota d'artista dalmata (Rivista dalmata), Zadar, 1850.
- I. Kukuljević-Sakcinski, Leben sudslavischer Kunstler, Zagreb, 1868.
- A. Bertolotti, Artisti veneti in Roma nei secoli XV, XVI e XVII (R. deputazione veneta di storia patria, Miscell. vol III.), Venecija, 1884.
- V. Miagostovich, Ancora di Natale Bonifacio (Nuovo cronista di Sebenico, anno IV.), Trst, 1896.
- F. Ehrle, Roma prima di Sixto V., Rim, 1908.
- Thieme-Becker, ALBK, IV., Leipzig, 1910.
- E. Benezit, Dictionnaire critique et documentaire des peintres, sculpteurs, dessinateurs et graveurs, Pariz, 1911.
- A. Dudan, La Dalmazia nell'arte italiana, Milano, 1921–22.
- L. Donati, N. B. (Archivio storico per la Dalmazia, sv. III), Rim, 1927.
- Isti, Un libro sconosciuto illustrato da N. B. sibenicense (ibid. sv. VII.), Rim, 1930.
- Isti, Intorno all' opera di N. B. (ibid. sv. XV.). Rim, 1933.
- R. Almagia, Intorno all' opera cartografica di N. B. (ibid. sv. XIV.), Rim, 1933.
- A. Bacotich, Due stampe assai rare di N. B. da Sebenico 1538–1592 (ibid. sv. XX.), Rim, 1936.
- Bryan, Michael. Dictionary of Painters and Engravers, Biographical and Critical (Volume I: A-K), (Robert Edmund Graves, ed.)p.131, George Bell and Sons, London, 1886
- Fabia Borroni, BONIFACIO (Bonifatio, Boniface), Christmas Day, said Bonifacio from Sibenik or Christmas Dalmatino in the Biographical Dictionary of Italian, Vol. 12, Rome, Institute of the Italian, 1971
- Christopher LCE Witcombe, Copyright in the Renaissance: Prints and the Privilege in Sixteenth-Century Venice and Rome, Brill Academic Publishers, 2004, p. 182-183.
- Predrag Matvejević, The Other Venice: Secrets of the City, Reaktion Books / University of Chicago Press, Chicago, 2007, p. 102.
