= Charles Batteux =

French philosopher and writer (1713–1780)

- Born: 6 May 1713; Alland'Huy-et-Sausseuil, Kingdom of France
- Died: 14 July 1780 (aged 67)
- Occupations: philosopher, writer

Charles Batteux (6 May 1713 – 14 July 1780) was a French philosopher and writer on aesthetics.

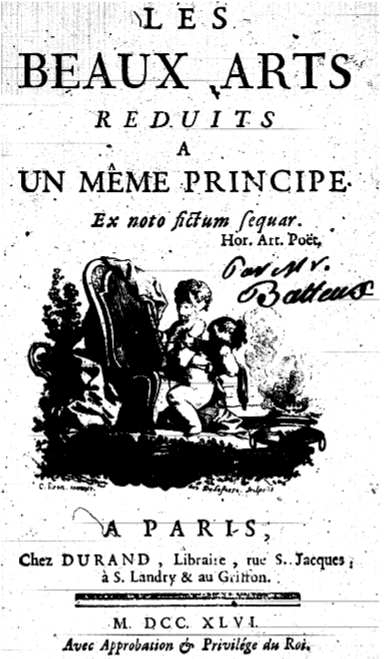
Title page of Les Beaux-Arts réduits à un même principe

== Biography ==
Batteux was born in Alland'Huy-et-Sausseuil, Ardennes, and studied theology at Reims. In 1739 he came to Paris, and after teaching in the colleges of Lisieux and Navarre, was appointed to the chair of Greek and Roman philosophy in the Collège de France. His 1746 treatise Les beaux arts réduits à un même principe (translated into English as The Fine Arts Reduced to a Single Principle, trans. James O. Young, Oxford: Oxford University Press, 2015) was an attempt to find a unity among existing theories of beauty and taste on "a single principle", and its views were widely accepted, not only in France but throughout Europe.

According to P. O. Kristeller,

the decisive step towards the system of the fine arts [thereby to the modern idea, "fine art"] was taken by the Abbé Batteux in his famous and influential treatise ... [making him] the first to set forth a clearcut system of the fine arts in a treatise devoted entirely to this subject.

The reputation thus gained, confirmed by his translation of Horace (1750), led to Batteux's becoming a member of the Académie des Inscriptions (1754) and of the Académie française (1761). His Cours de belles lettres (1765) was afterwards included with some minor writings in the large treatise, Principes de la littérature (1774). His philosophical writings were La morale d'Épicure tirée de ses propres écrits (1758), and the Histoire des causes premières (1769). In consequence of the freedom with which in this work he attacked the abuse of authority in philosophy, he lost his professorial chair. His last and most extensive work was a Cours d'études à l'usage des élèves de l'école militaire in forty-five volumes.

In Les Beaux Arts, Batteux developed a theory influenced by John Locke through Voltaire's sceptical sensualism. He held that the fine arts are arts ("assemblages of rules for doing well"), for producing fine or beautiful things ("which please" of themselves), always "in imitation of la belle nature" and requiring genius. Applying this principle to the art of poetry, and analysing, line by line and even word by word, the works of great poets, he deduced the law that the beauty of poetry consists in the accuracy, beauty and harmony of individual expression. His Histoire des causes premières was among the first attempts at a history of philosophy, and in his work on Epicurus, following on Gassendi, he defended Epicureanism against the general attacks made against it.

For his work "La Morale d'Épicure" 1758 see A. Toscano,“La Morale d’Épicure” di Charles Batteux ed il principio del “secondo natura”, in “Scienze e Ricerche” n. 42, 1 dicembre 2016, ISSN: 2283-5873, pp. 20–29.

Strictly in Aesthetics terms Batteux sets the single principle for fine arts in imitation of nature, and this in terms of ideal of perfection to make a harmonious whole: "let's choose the most beautiful parts of nature, to make an exquisite whole, more perfect then nature, but never ending to be natural". In this concept, clearly, Batteux follows a long tradition, present at least in Leon Battista Alberti; as well as for the expression of fine arts, present in Giovanni Battista Armenini and more back in Sebastiano Serlio.
