= Giovanni Battista Armenini =

Giovanni Battista Armenini or Armanini (1530–1609) was an Italian art historian, critic, and academic. He was born and died in Faenza. His main contribution was the publication in 1587 of the theoretical treatise on the practice of painting, titled De veri precetti della pittura. Armenini describes that he had the opportunity to travel through Rome, Naples, Milan, Genoa, Venice and other cities of Italy for nine years. In 1564, he became rector of the church of San Tommaso in Faenza.

He dedicated his opus to Guglielmo Gonzaga, Duke of Mantua. In the first book, he speaks of major Renaissance and Mannerist painters of the past including Raphael, Michelangelo, Titian, Antonio da Correggio, Sebastiano Veneziano, Giulio Romano, and Andrea del Sarto. He criticizes later painters like Perino del Vaga, Daniele da Volterra, Domenico Beccafumi, and Parmigianino. Contemporary theoretical books had been published based on writings of Leonardo da Vinci, Giovanni Paolo Lomazzo, and Leon Battista Alberti.

The work was republished by Stefano Ticozzi in Milan in 1820.

In a more strictly philosophical way ( Aesthetics ) his work can be seen as a link between the previous authors of Italian humanism and the subsequent philosophers, such as Félibien des Avaux or the more known Batteux, considered the latter, probably generously, the real starter of modern aesthetics ( Kant ).
Armenini dedicated his treatise "to beginners, to scholars, and to lovers of fine arts", expression fine arts already used by Sebastiano Serlio. Remembering as example of a complete artist "the painter, who was almost a miracle, that accompanied with Architecture, and with histories, the Painting, the Music, and the Poetry was first Gitto Fiorentino", Armenini shows an extraordinary modernity in the composition of the catalog "fine arts". Going on to analyze the meaning of "imitation" in fine arts he states that this is the selection of the best parts of the nature, as already said by Leon Battista Alberti, and in their right composition to make a whole harmonious and natural: "So, in addition to seek the best things of nature, and most perfect, however we have to compensate using the good manner, and so going ahead so well, as you can judge that it's enough, in order that, accorded with the natural good, it becomes a composition of excellent beauty"; and realizing that the artist should not make the bloomer of creating a not unitary forced sticky, as you might see in some works, "because they are composed of the same members, that are beautiful while seeing each one, from the good being picked, but when put together they seem to be unpleasant, and boring, and this because they are members of several beautiful figures, but not of these one". And so the idea that the artist is going to represent the ideal of perfection, "so the Idea of man is the universal man, whose countenance are made then the men". All these ideas will migrate along decades, and we find them almost identical in later theorists, as in the famed Batteux in his treatise "Les beaux arts réduits à un même principe"
