= Minoo Lenarz =

German university professor (1966 – 2015)

Minoo Lenarz (Moshrefi)
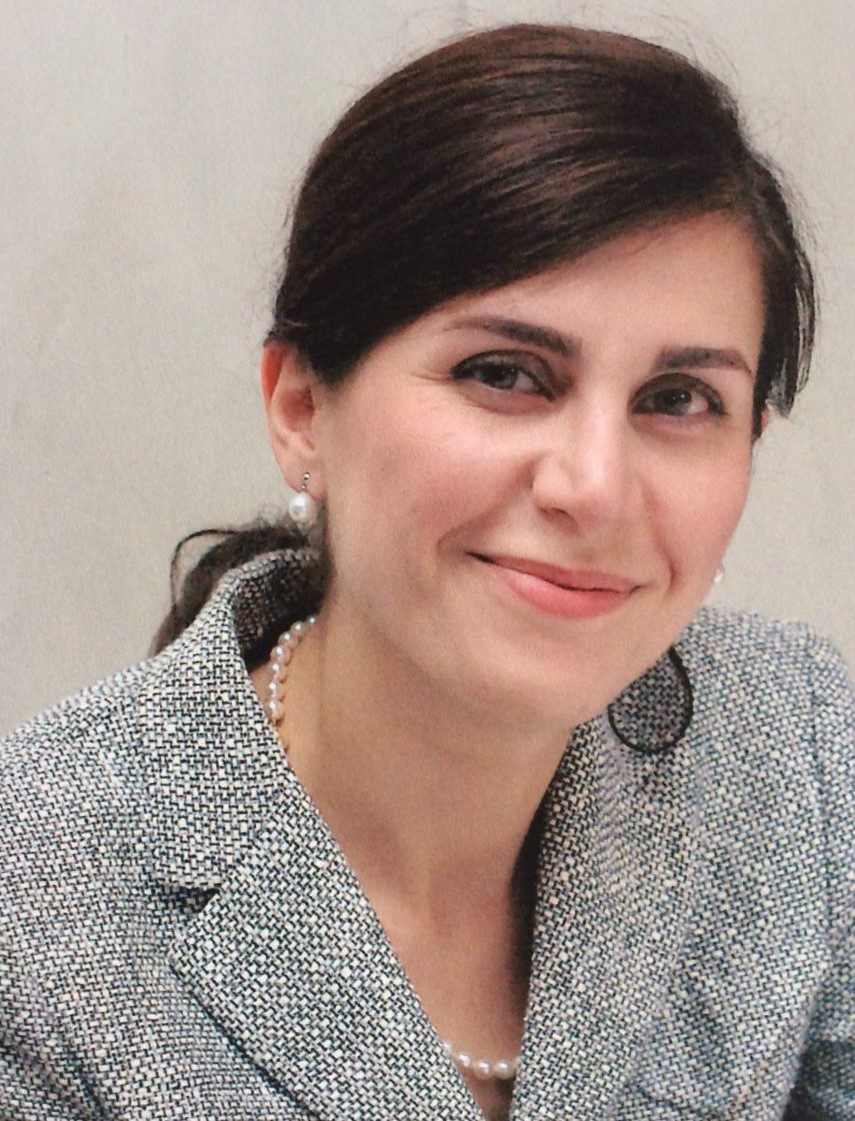
- Born: 18 September 1966; Tehran, Iran
- Died: 2 December 2015 (aged 49); Hanover, Germany
- Spouse: Thomas Lenarz
- Scientific career
- Fields: Otorhinolaryngology

Minoo Lenarz, born Minoo Moshrefi (Persian: مینو مشرفی; 18 September 1966 – 2 December 2015), was an Iranian-German Professor and medical scientist.

== Early life and education ==
Minoo Moshrefi was born in Tehran in 1966. She studied medicine at the Iran University of Medical Sciences in Tehran from 1985 to 1993. She gained her specialist degree in the field of Otorhinolaryngology with the best results among the Iranian students in 1997. In the same year, she received a scholarship from the German Academic Exchange Service (DAAD) for a three-year training course in the field of cranial basic surgery in Germany and came to Hanover, where she worked under Majid Samii and Thomas Lenarz.

== Career ==
After completing her sabbatical study at the House Ear Institute in Los Angeles, she returned to Germany and received her Ph.D. from Hannover Medical School in 2001. She was the head of the "Auditorial Brainstem and Middle Brain Implants" research group at the Medical University of Hanover from 2002 to 2010, where she cooperated with her future husband, Thomas Lenarz.

During this time she was involved in development of an Auditory Midbrain Implant (AMI), a new hearing prosthesis designed for stimulation of the inferior colliculus in deaf patients who cannot sufficiently benefit from cochlear implants. In 2008, she defended her post doctoral thesis in the field of Otorhinolaryngology and received permission to teach in this field.

In 2010, she began to work at the Charité medical university in Berlin.

Her work in the field of audiology and Otorhinolaryngology contributed to the establishment of the Hearing4all Cluster of Excellence.

She died on 2 December 2015 in Hanover.
