= Episcopius =

Episcopius is a surname. Notable people with the surname include:

- Ludovicus Episcopius (c. 1520–1595), Dutch-Flemish composer from the Franco-Flemish school
- Simon Episcopius (1583–1643), Dutch theologian
