= Mignot =

Mignot is a surname of French origin. People with the name include:

- Aimé Mignot (b. 1932), French professional football player and coach
- Claudine Françoise Mignot (1624–1711), French adventuress
- C.B.G. Mignot a French toy soldier manufacturer from 1825
- Jean-Pascal Mignot (b. 1981), French professional football player
- Marie Louise Mignot (a.k.a. Madame Denis) (1712–1790), French woman who was the niece and heiress of Voltaire
- Suzanne Le Mignot (b. 1970), American television news anchor and reporter in Chicago
- Théonie Rivière Mignot (1819-1875), American restaurateur
