= Écordal =

- Commune
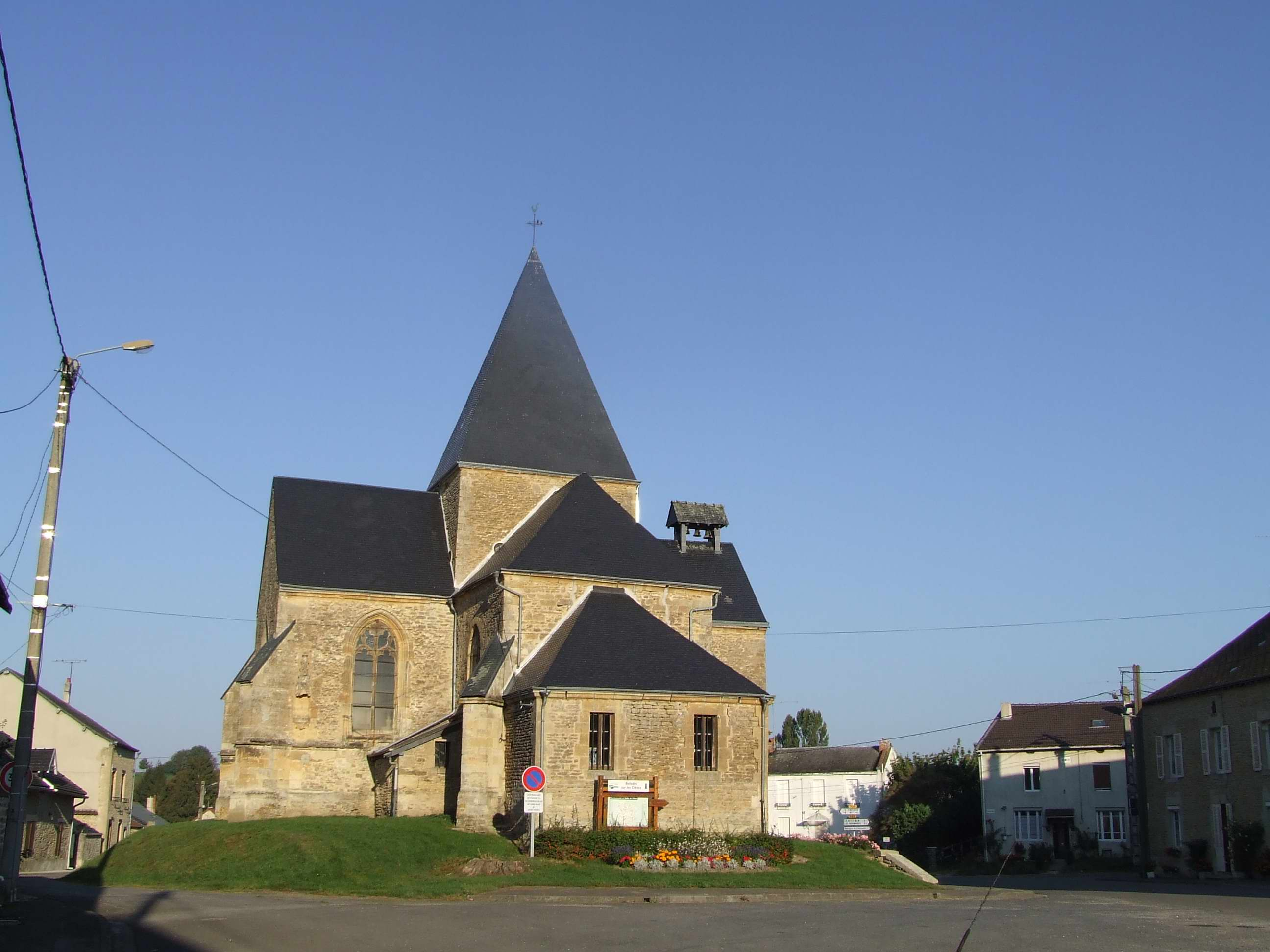
- The church in Écordal

- Coat of arms
- Location of Écordal
- Location within France Location within Grand Est
- Coordinates: 49°31′42″N 4°34′53″E
- Country: France
- Region: Grand Est
- Department: Ardennes
- Arrondissement: Vouziers
- Canton: Attigny
- Intercommunality: Crêtes Préardennaises

Government
  - Mayor (2020–2026): Eric Zuccari
- Area^{1}: 12.89 km^{2} (4.98 sq mi)
- Elevation: 110 m (360 ft)
- Population (2023): 283
  - Density: 22.0/km^{2} (56.9/sq mi)
- Time zone: UTC+01:00 (CET)
  - Summer (DST): UTC+02:00 (CEST)
- INSEE/Postal code: 08151 /08130
- ^{1} French Land Register data, which excludes lakes, ponds, glaciers > 1 km^{2} (0.386 sq mi or 247 acres) and river estuaries.

Écordal (French pronunciation: [ekɔʁdal]) is a commune in the Ardennes department in northern France.

== Population ==
Historical population
Year	Pop.	±% p.a.
1968	325	—
1975	291	−1.57%
1982	225	−3.61%
1990	214	−0.62%
1999	267	+2.49%
2007	302	+1.55%
2012	295	−0.47%
2017	324	+1.89%
2023	283	−2.23%
Source: INSEE

== See also ==
- Communes of the Ardennes department
