= Hans Brosamer =

German artist (1490–c. 1554)

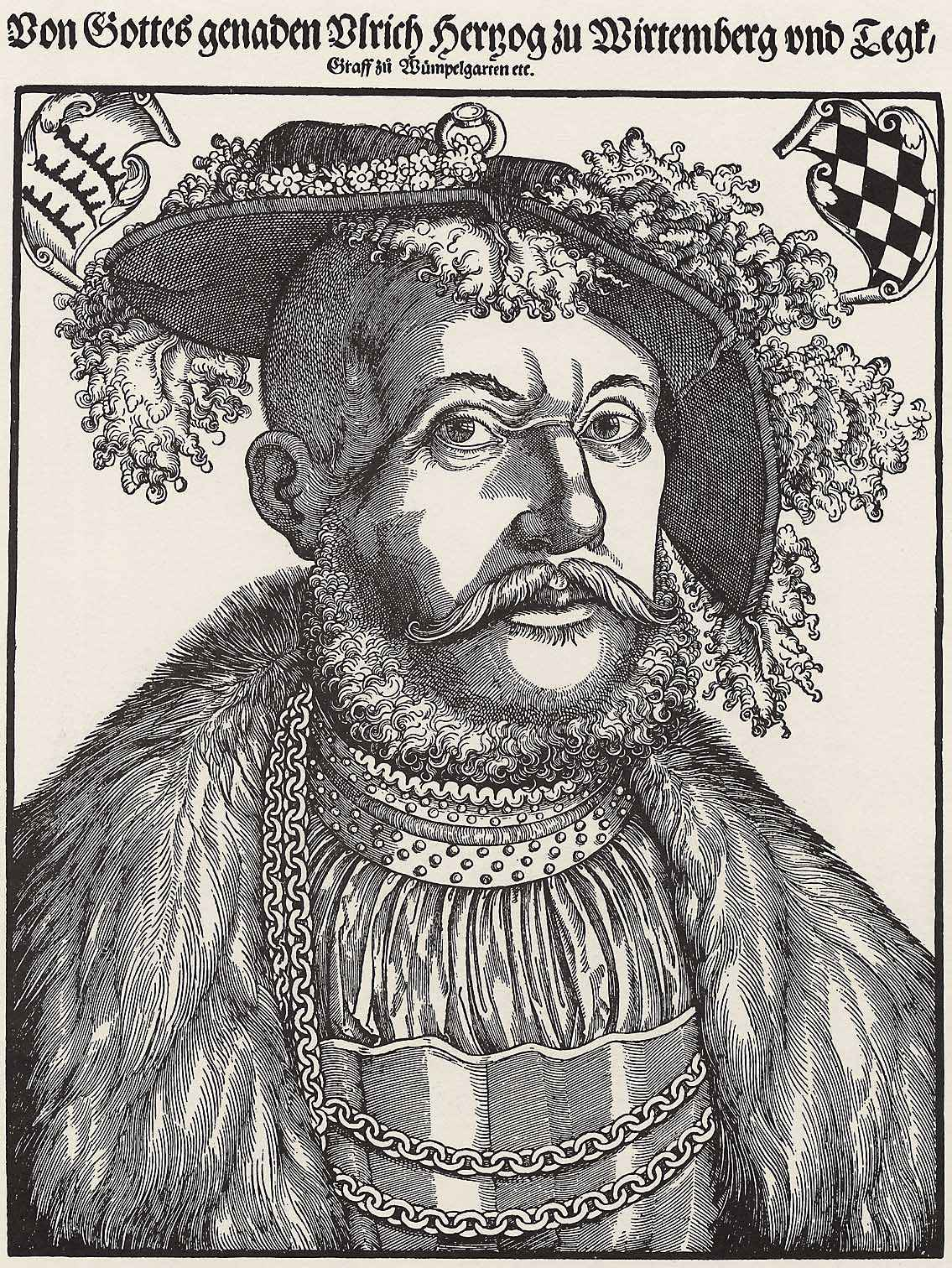
Ulrich, Duke of Württemberg, woodcut, c. 1545.

Hans Brosamer (born in the late 1490s, probably in Fulda; died c. 1554) was a German draughtsman, printmaker and painter of the Renaissance period. His life has left hardly any documentary trace, other than his prints, but he was active in Fulda from 1536 to 1545, and later worked in Erfurt.

His works include over 600 woodcuts, mostly illustrations for books of various sorts, but also a number of independent prints. He produced 38 engravings (as listed by Hollstein), and a number of drawings, mostly with his monogram. As a painter, a number of portraits of figures from the local elites, normally at half-length, are attributed to him.

On account of the small size of his engravings he is counted among the Little Masters, and many of these are rather derivative of others in the group, such as Jacob Binck and Heinrich Aldegrever, and of Lucas Cranach the Elder in his portraits. One of his woodcuts was in contrast very large, and no doubt intended to be pasted to walls. This was his David and Bathsheba, built up from nine blocks, and printed in 1554, his last dated work; unsurprisingly, it is very rare. His woodcuts include a hostile Caricature of Luther with Seven Heads (1529).

He signs himself on his portrait of the Landgrave of Hesse, 'Formschneider zu Erfurt,' ("blockcutter" of Erfurt), where he resided during the latter part of his life. He sometimes marked his plates with his name, and sometimes with a cipher.

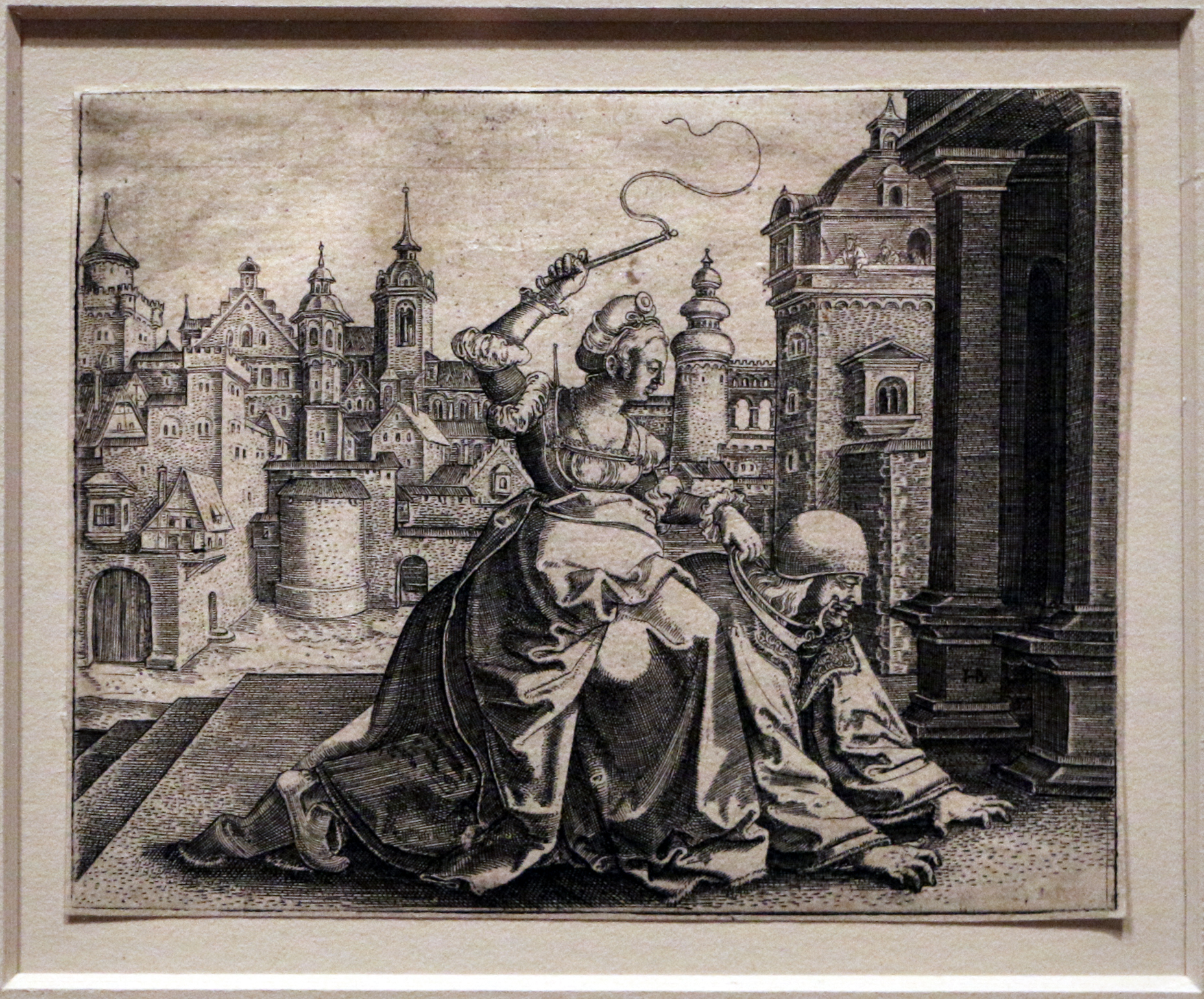
Engraving, Phyllis and Aristotle, c. 1545

== Selected works ==
The following are his principal works:

== Selected engravings ==
- Portrait of George Wicelaus. 1542.
- Portrait of John II, Abbot of Fulda.
- Samson and Delilah; Johannes Brosamer Fulda degens faciebat, 15 H. B. 45.
- Bathsheba in the Bath.
- Idolatry of Solomon. 1543.
- Phyllis riding on Socrates.
- Laocoon and his Children. 1538.
- Marcus Curtius leaping into the Gulf; circular. 1540.
- The Judgment of Paris.
- The Crucifixion; Joh. Brosamer Fulda degens faciebat, 1542

== Woodcuts ==
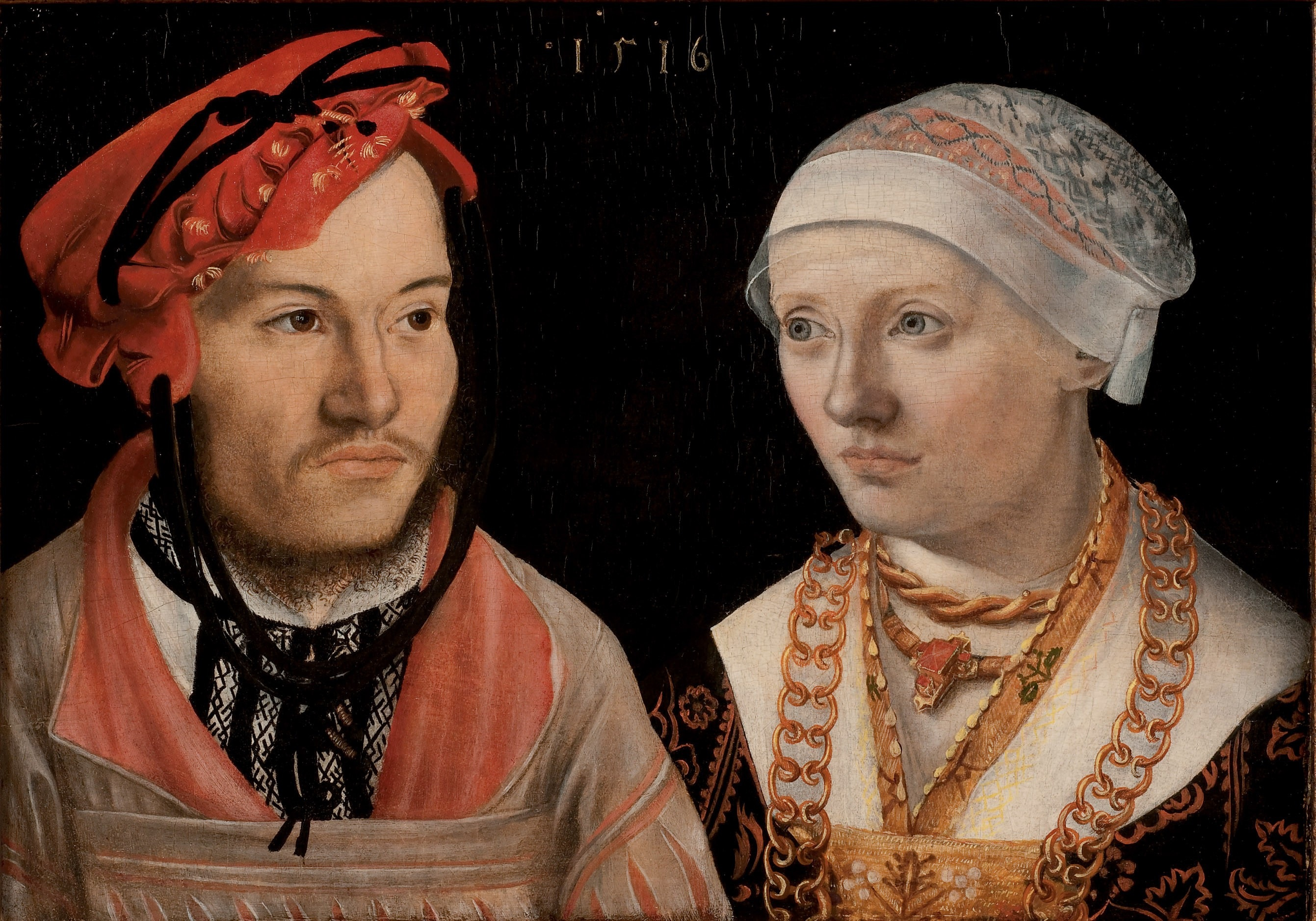
Portrait of a couple, oil on panel painting, 1516

- Creation of Eve.
- Eve giving Adam the apple.
- David and Bathsheba.
- Queen of Sheba before Solomon.
- The Last Supper.
- SS. Jerome, Matthew, Mark, Luke, John, Paul, James the Great.
- John the Baptist in Prison.
- Twenty-one pieces from the Revelation.
- Caricature of Luther with Seven Heads, 1529

== Portraits ==
- Eoben Hess, the poet.
- George Sturtz, physician.
- Philip, Landgrave of Hesse.
