= Dunker (disambiguation) =

A Dunker is a breed of dog, also known as the Norwegian Hound.

Dunker or Dunkers may also refer to:

== People ==
- Balthasar Anton Dunker (1746–1807), German landscape painter and etcher
- Bernhard Dunker (1809–1870), Norwegian jurist, barrister and Attorney General of Norway
- Conradine Birgitte Dunker (1780–1866), Norwegian socialite and writer, mother of Bernhard Dunker
- Gennings Dunker (born 2003), American football player
- Gösta Dunker (1905–1973), Swedish footballer
- Henry Dunker (1870–1962), Swedish businessman and industrialist
- Jens Gram Dunker (1892–1981), Norwegian architect
- Oļģerts Dunkers (1832–1997), Latvian actor and film director
- Philipp Heinrich Dunker (1779–1836), Swiss-German landscape painter and etcher
- Tommy Dunker (born 1969), West German former speedway rider
- Vincent Joseph Dunker (1878–1974), American photographer, inventor and camera manufacturer
- Wilhelm Dunker (1809–1885), German geologist, paleontologist and malacologist

== Other uses ==
- Schwarzenau Brethren, also known as Dunkers, an Anabaptist group
- Dilbert Dunker, an aircraft training device
- The Dunker, an underwater facility at the Underwater Escape Training Unit in Somerset, South West England
- Dunker, a parish in Flen Municipality, Sweden

== See also ==
- Duncker, a surname (includes a list of persons with the name)
- Dunk (disambiguation)
