= Johann Jakob Biedermann =

Swiss painter and etcher (1763-1830)

- Selfportrait
- Born: 7 August 1763; Winterthur, Switzerland
- Died: 10 April 1830 (aged 66); Zürich, Switzerland
- Known for: Painting, printmaking, etching

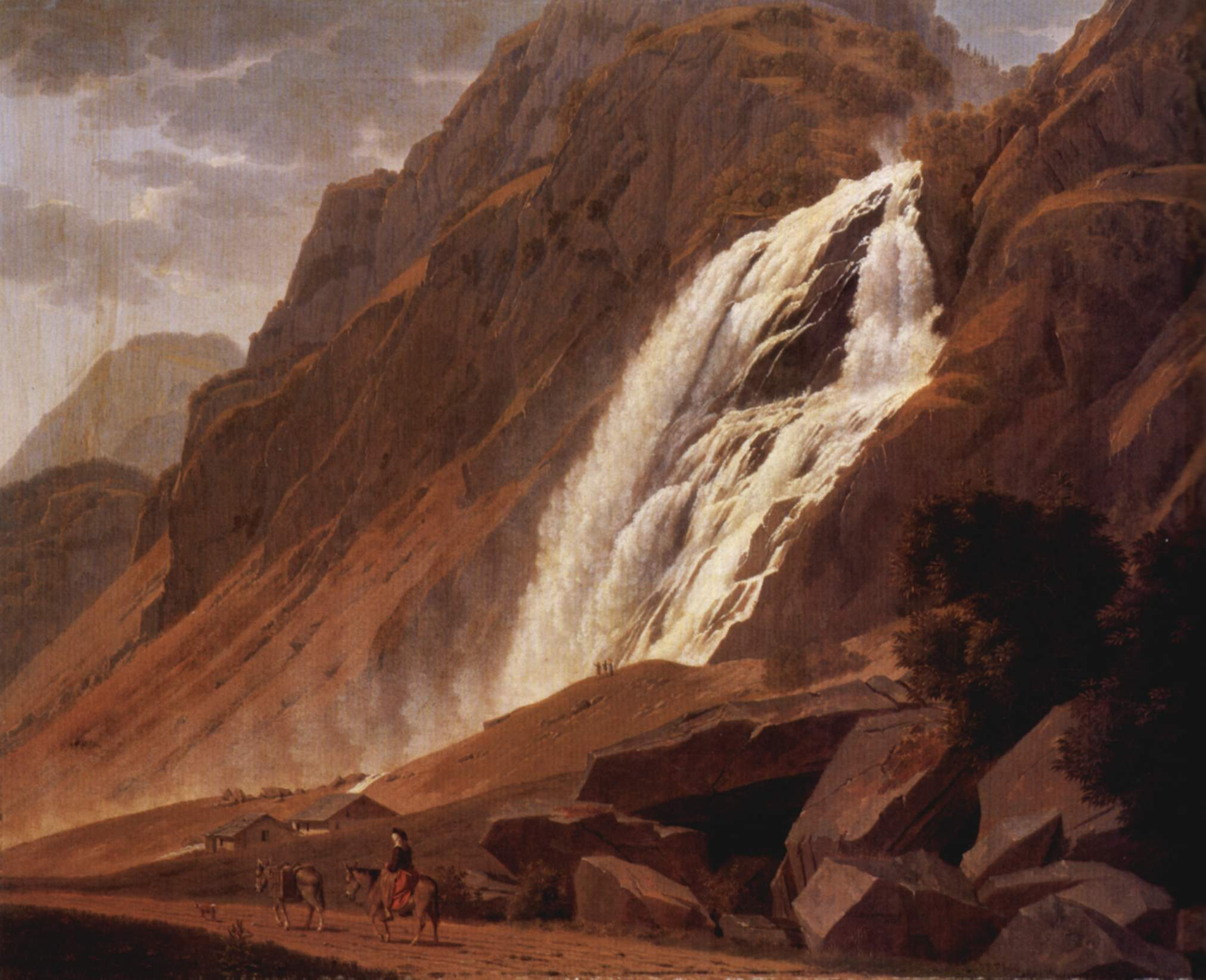
The Pissevache Falls, 1815, Kunstmuseum Winterthur

Johann Jakob Biedermann (7 August 1763 – 10 April 1830) was a Swiss painter, printmaker and etcher associated with the Swiss Kleinmeister tradition. He became known for etched and coloured views of Swiss towns and landscapes, including his 1796 series of views of the principal towns of the old Swiss Confederacy.

== Biography ==
Johann Jakob Biedermann was born in Winterthur on 7 August 1763. He received drawing lessons there from Johann Rudolf Schellenberg. In 1778, after his father intended him to become a baker, Biedermann left for Bern. There he worked with Heinrich Rieter and Johann Ludwig Aberli, gaining experience in coloured topographical prints and etching.

In Bern, Biedermann worked as a painter and etcher, and was at times a drawing teacher. He spent time in Lausanne and Geneva around 1783. After the Helvetic Revolution, he served as a secretary in the Helvetic government in Bern and Zug.

In 1801, Biedermann worked in Zürich for the art dealer Füssli & Co. He then lived in Konstanz from 1802 to 1807, in Basel from 1807 to 1814, and again in Konstanz from 1814 to 1824. In 1827, he moved to Zürich-Aussersihl. Biedermann died in Zürich on 10 April 1830.

== Work ==
Biedermann worked as a landscape painter, printmaker, portraitist and animal painter. His work belonged to the Swiss Kleinmeister tradition, with a focus on idyllic landscape and town views.

Biedermann's printed works included views of Swiss towns and landscapes. In 1796, he published two series of views of the principal towns of the old Swiss Confederacy, which he designed, etched and partly hand-coloured himself. His etched and coloured Swiss views followed the manner of Johann Ludwig Aberli and were well received in their time.

From about 1790, Biedermann also worked in oil painting, including small-format landscapes and genre scenes. He also published topographical works on Switzerland. His works are held by institutions including the Kunstmuseum Bern, the Wessenberg-Galerie in Konstanz, the Staatsgalerie Stuttgart and the Kunst Museum Winterthur.

== Gallery ==
Rosenlaui Glacier near the Wetterhorn, 1800

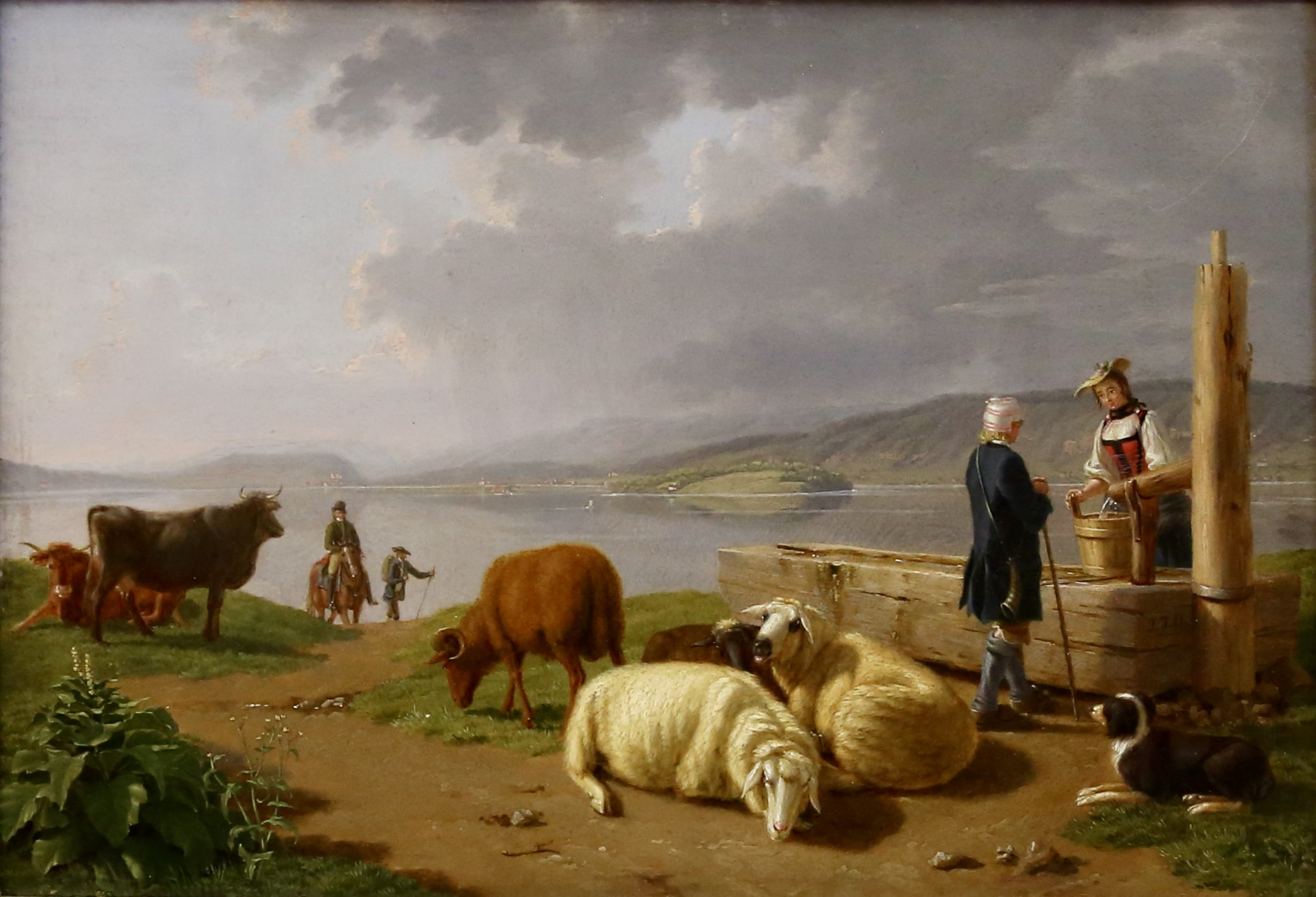
At Lake Biel near Gerolfingen, c. 1807

Schaffhausen from the west, between 1812 and 1823
