= Philipp Heinrich Dunker =

Swiss-German landscape painter and etcher

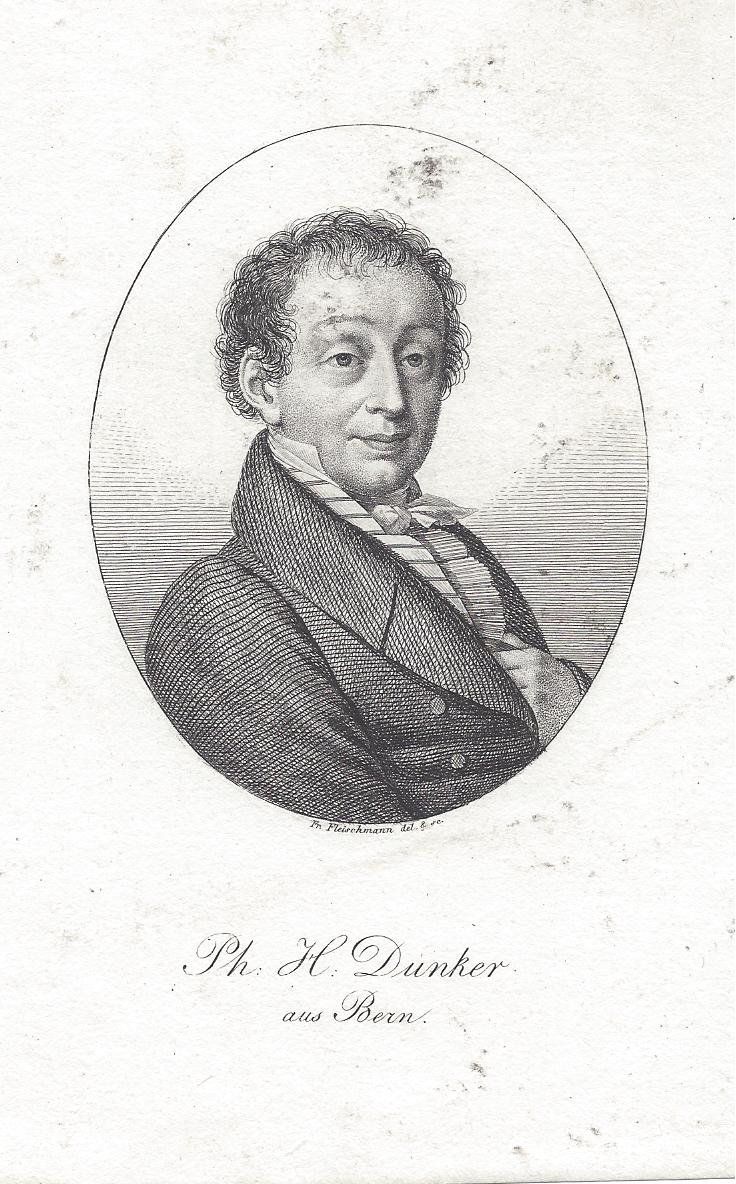
Philipp Heinrich Dunker; portrait by Friedrich Fleischmann (c. 1830)

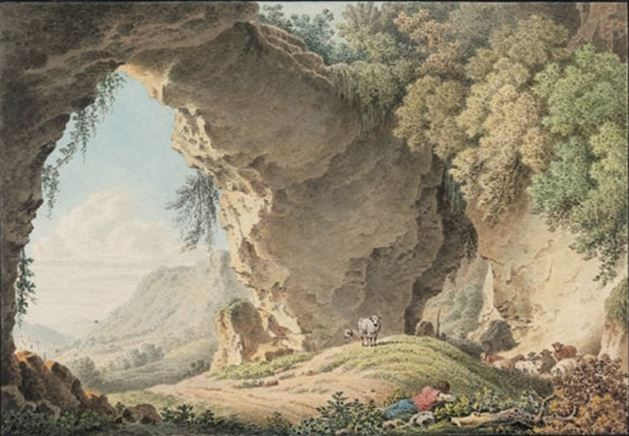
Mountain Landscape with Sleeping Shepherds

Philipp Heinrich Dunker (7 August 1779, Bern – 3 May 1836, Nuremberg) was a Swiss-German landscape painter and etcher.

== Life and work ==
He was the fourth child of the painter, Balthasar Anton Dunker, and his wife, Johanna Franziska Fahrni, from Eriz. His name was taken from his godparents, the painters Jacob Philipp Hackert and Heinrich Rieter.

He learned art from his father. In 1800, he relocated to Nuremberg and worked for the art publisher, Johann Friedrich Frauenholz, for whom he did miniature watercolors of Swiss landscapes. Four years later, he became a member of the Nuremberg Painting Academy. After becoming established, he switched to etching a variety of subjects, but always focused on Swiss themes.

In addition, he produced numerous prints based on works by other contemporary artists; such as Johann Ludwig Aberli and Johann Adam Klein. He also worked as an illustrator; notably for the Naturgeschichte der Vögel Deutschlands (Natural History of the Birds of Germany), by Johann Friedrich Naumann and his father, Johann Andreas Naumann.

In 1821, he became a drawing teacher at the Nuremberg art school. During his last years, he worked exclusively in oils. After Frauenholz died, in 1822, he sold his pictures by subscription. His major works include Prospekte aus der Umgebung von Nürnberg (Views from the Surroundings of Nuremberg, 1820), after works by Klein, and Ansichten und Grundriss der Anlagen des Schmausenbucks bei Nürnberg (Views and Maps of the Schmausenbuck Area, 1833).
