= Adrian Zingg =

Swiss painter (1734–1816)

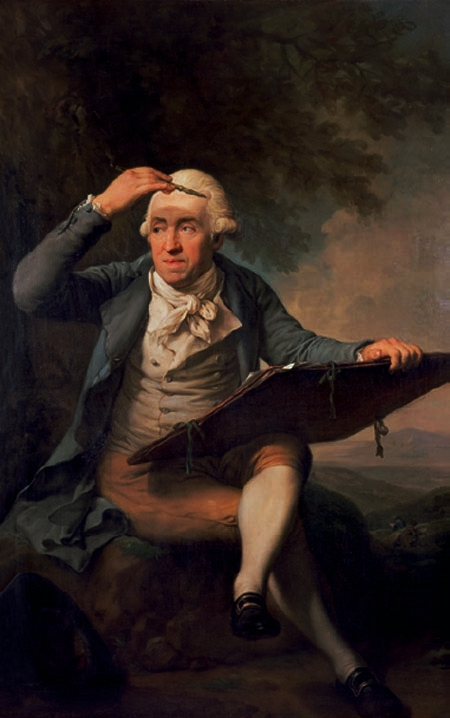
Adrian Zingg; portrait by Anton Graff (1799)

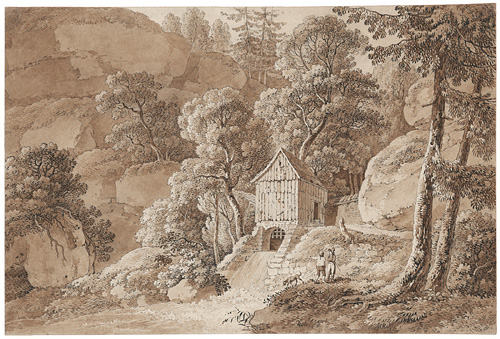
Landscape near Hohenstein

Adrian Zingg (April 15, 1734, St.Gallen – May 26, 1816, Leipzig) was a Swiss painter.

== Life ==
Adrian Zingg received his professional training from his father, the steel cutter Bartolomäus Zingg, then became an apprentice with the engraver Johann Rudolf Holzhalb. In 1757, he worked in Bern, painting vedute with Johann Ludwig Aberli. Together with the medalist Johann Caspar Mörikofer (1732–1790), he travelled to Paris in 1759, where Zingg worked for seven years with the engraver Johann Georg Wille.

In 1764, he was supported by Christian Ludwig von Hagedorn as an engraver at the newly founded Dresden Academy of Fine Arts, where he worked as a teacher from 1766. He had an intensive relationship with professor Christian Wilhelm Ernst Dietrich, who acted as a mentor for Zingg. In 1774, after the death of Dietrich, Zingg began to complete his late work and published a total of 87 sheets.

In 1769, he also became a member of the Vienna Academy and, in 1787, a member of the Prussian Academy of Arts. In 1803 he was appointed professor of copper etching at the Dresden Academy. Some of Zingg's famous students included Carl August Richter and his son Adrian Ludwig Richter, Heinrich Theodor Wehle and Christoph Nathe.
