= Sigmund Freudenberger =

Swiss painter (1745–1801)

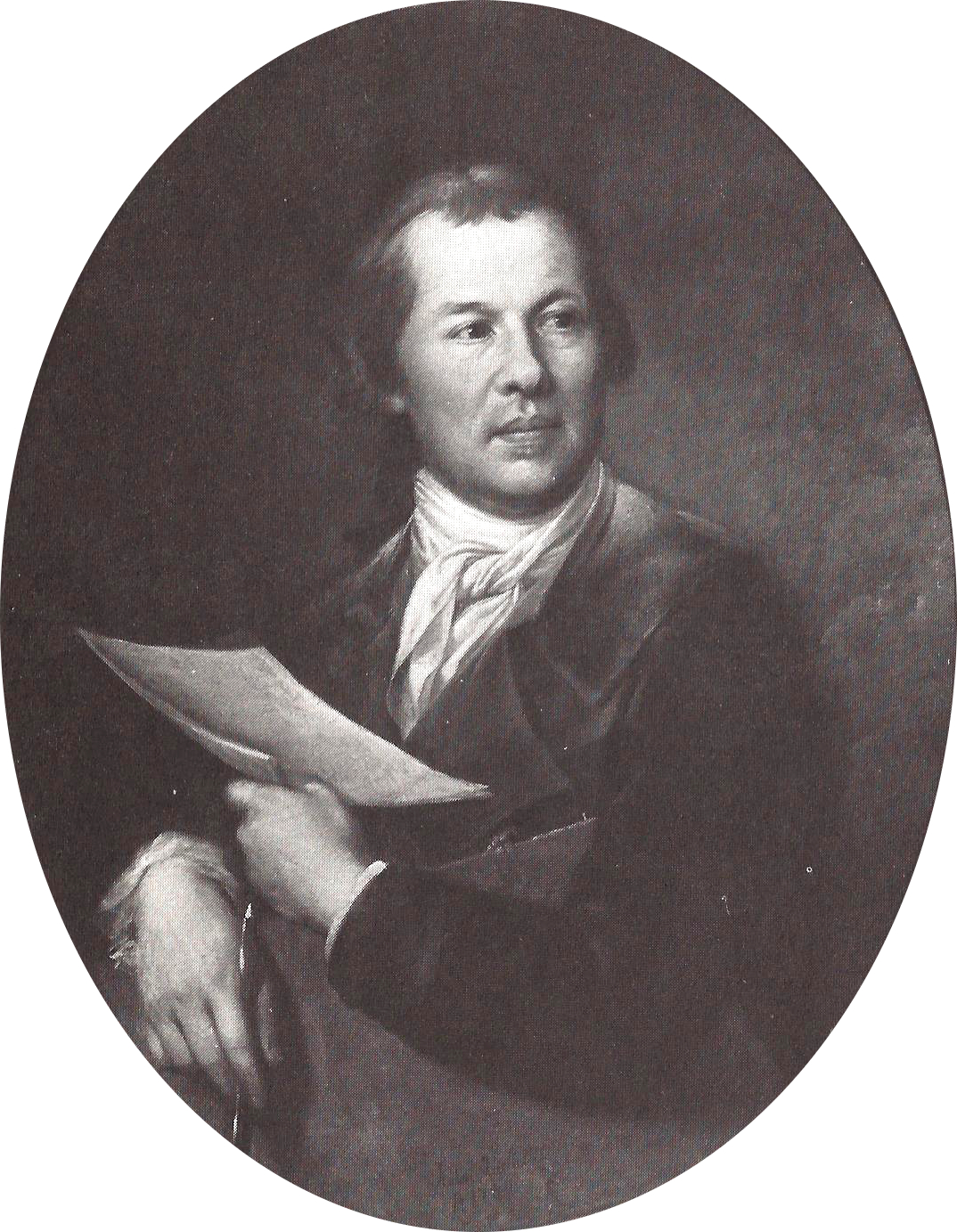
- Portrait by Anton Hickel, 1786
- Born: 16 June 1745; Bern, Switzerland
- Died: 15 November 1801 (aged 56); Bern, Switzerland
- Known for: Painting, drawing, engraving, etching
- Spouse: Marianne Mesmer

Sigmund Freudenberger (16 June 1745 – 15 November 1801) was a Swiss painter, engraver and etcher associated with the Bernese Kleinmeister tradition. After training in Switzerland and working in Paris, he returned to Bern, where rural genre scenes became central to his work.

== Biography ==
Sigmund Freudenberger was born in Bern on 16 June 1745. He studied with Emanuel Handmann from 1761 to 1764, following him from Bern to Basel in the final year of his training. After spending several months in Lausanne on portrait commissions, Freudenberger left for Paris in 1765 with the engraver Adrian Zingg. In Paris, Zingg helped introduce him to artistic circles, including that of Johann Georg Wille.

While in Paris, Freudenberger attended Jakob Schmutzer's evening academy. He also joined Wille on outdoor study excursions between 1766 and 1770 and came into contact with François Boucher through Wille. He returned to Bern in 1773 and married Marianne Mesmer in 1776. Freudenberger died in Bern on 15 November 1801.

== Work ==
Freudenberger produced paintings, drawings, engravings and etchings, with a focus on Swiss genre subjects. His work included pastel portraits, rural genre scenes and depictions of traditional dress, and he adapted elements of Parisian Rococo art to rural Bernese subjects. After his return to Bern in 1773, he had success with rural genre scenes, many of which were reproduced as engravings and circulated widely. From the mid-1770s onward, rural genre scenes became a central part of his work.

In 1778, Freudenberger received official protection against unauthorised copies of his prints. The Heptaméron Français, which he illustrated with Balthasar Anton Dunker, was published from 1778 to 1780. In 1785, he produced the costume series Premier Cahier des différents Habillements de la Ville de Berne. Freudenberger is considered one of the leading Bernese Kleinmeister of the late 18th century.

Works by Freudenberger are held in collections including the Öffentliche Kunstsammlung Basel, Kunstmuseum Bern, the Swiss National Library, Kunsthaus Zürich and the Graphische Sammlung of ETH Zurich.

== Gallery ==
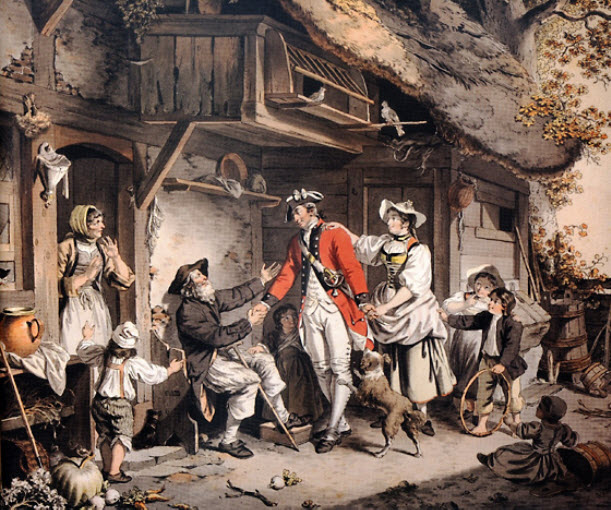
Return of the Swiss Soldier

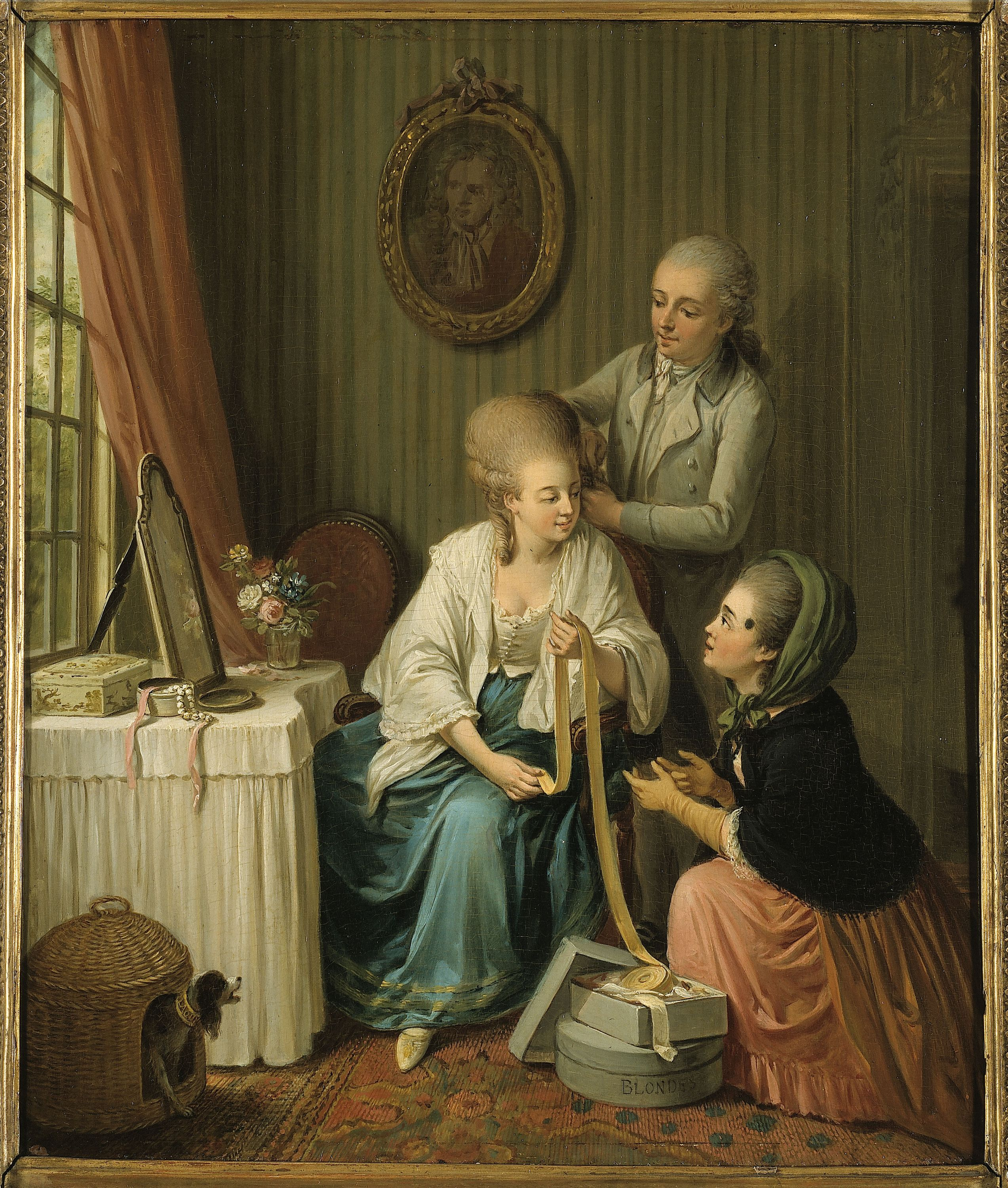
The Ribbon Seller

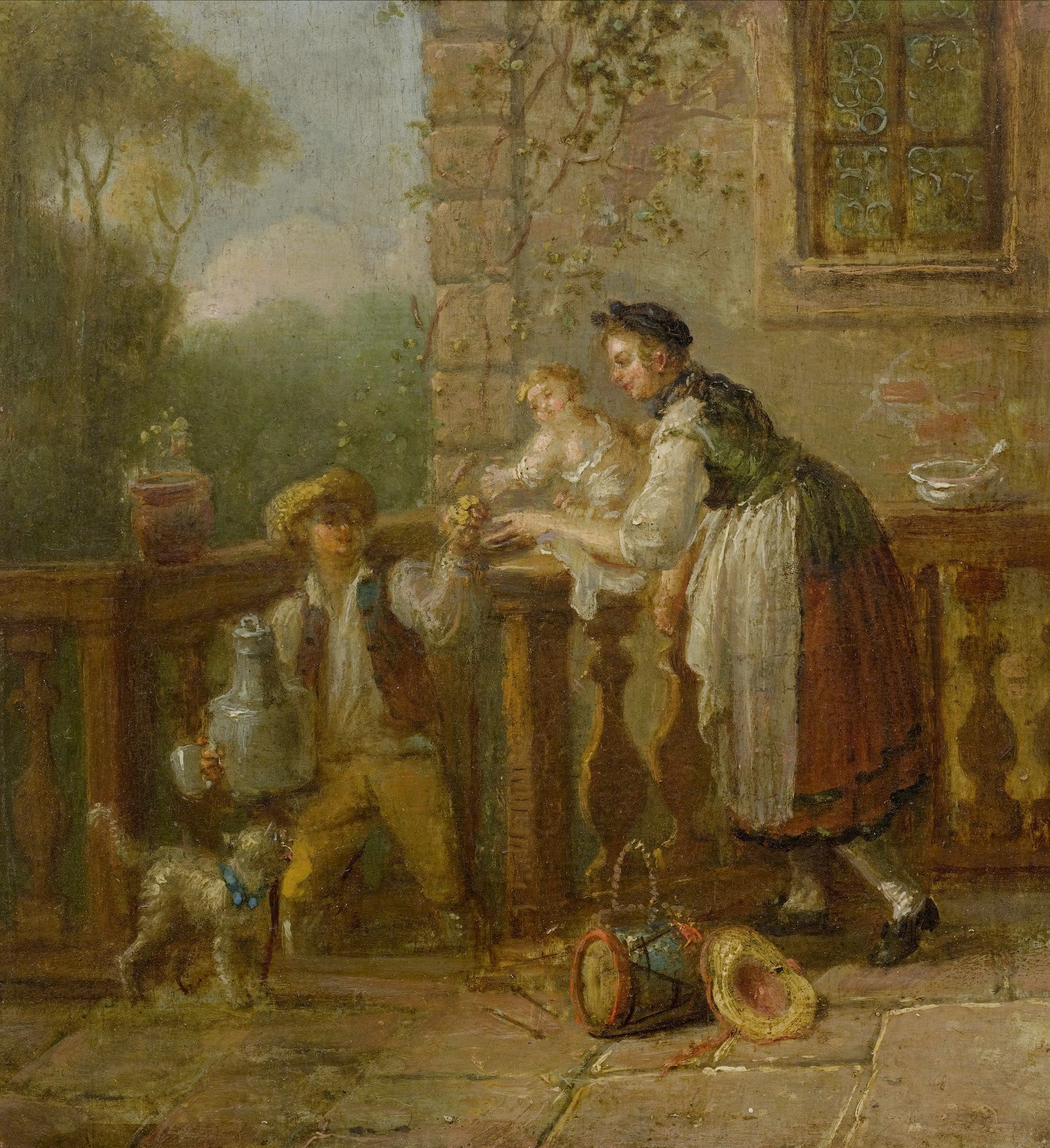
Scene on a balcony
