= Dunc =

Dunc is a masculine given name, usually a short form (hypocorism) of Duncan. It may refer to:

- Duncan Dunc Annan (1895–1981), American National Football League player
- Dunc “Turbo” Dindas (fl. 1985-present), Turkish graffiti artist
- Duncan Dunc Fisher (born 1927), Canadian National Hockey League player
- Edgar Dunc Gray (1906–1996), Australian track cyclist
- Duncan Dunc McCallum (1940–1983), Canadian World Hockey Association and National Hockey League player and Western Hockey League coach
- Duncan Dunc Munro (1901–1958), Canadian National Hockey League player and coach and 1924 Olympic champion team captain
- Duncan Dunc Rousseau (born 1945), Canadian ice hockey forward
- Duncan Dunc Wilson (born 1948), Canadian National Hockey League goaltender
- Dunc, a fictional character in the Culpepper Adventures series by Gary Paulsen

== See also ==
- Dunc Gray Velodrome, Sydney, Australia
- Dunc McCallum Memorial Trophy, awarded annually to the Coach of the Year in the Western Hockey League
- Duncan Ferguson (born 1971), Scottish football coach and former player nicknamed "Big Dunc"
- Dunk (disambiguation)
