= Dunk =

Dunk or Dunks may refer to:

== People ==
=== Dunk ===
- Ben Dunk, (born 1987), Australian cricketer
- Bill Dunk, (born 1938), Australian golfer
- Chris Dunk (born 1958), American former tennis player
- George Montagu-Dunk, 2nd Earl of Halifax (1716–1771), British statesman
- Harrison Dunk (born 1990), English footballer
- Lewis Dunk (born 1991), English footballer
- Mark C. Dunk (born 1957), also known as Kosmo Vinyl, sometime manager of the English rock band The Clash and record producer
- Thomas Dunk (died 1718), English ironmonger, benefactor and Sheriff of London
- Thomas von der Dunk (born 1961), Dutch cultural historian, writer and columnist
- William Dunk (1897–1984), Australian government official
- Henry Dunks (1882–1955), Australian politician

=== Fictional characters ===
- Dunk, a main character in the Tales of Dunk and Egg fantasy novella series by George R. R. Martin
- Dunk (mascot), mascot of the National Security Agency unveiled in 2015

== Places ==
- Dunk, Queensland, a locality in the Cassowary Coast Region, Australia
- Dunk Island, off the coast of Queensland, Australia

== Entertainment ==
- Dunk (2020 TV series), a Pakistani drama serial that premiered in 2020 on ARY Digital
- Dunk (band), a 1990s Canadian power pop band
- "Dunk", a 2026 single by Todoroki Hajime

== Other uses ==
- Slam dunk, type of basketball shot
- Nike Dunk, a type of basketball shoe from Nike
- Dunk (elephant), the first elephant to reside at the National Zoo in Washington, D.C.

== See also ==
- Dunking, a form of water torture
- Dunking (biscuit), dipping food into a drink
- Dunker (disambiguation)
- Dunkin (surname)
- Dunc, a given name
