= Duncker =

Duncker is a surname. Notable people with the surname include:

- Alexander Duncker (1813–1879), German publisher and bookseller
- Carl Friedrich Wilhelm Duncker (1781–1869), German publisher
- Franz Duncker (1822–1888), German publisher, politician, and social reformer.
- Georg Duncker (1870–1953), German ichthyologist
- Hans Julius Duncker (1881–1961), German ornithologist
- Hermann Duncker (1874–1960), German Marxist politician, historian and social scientist
- Joachim Zachris Duncker (1774–1809), Swedish soldier
- Karl Duncker (1903–1940), German psychologist
- Käte Duncker (1871–1953), German activist and politician
- Maximilian Wolfgang Duncker (1811–1886), German historian and politician
- Patricia Duncker (born 1951), British novelist and academic
- Wolfgang Duncker (1909–1942), German journalist and film critic

== See also ==
- Dunker (disambiguation)
