= Heinrich Theodor Wehle =

German-Sorbian landscape painter

- Born: 7 March 1778; Förstgen, Görlitz
- Died: 1 January 1805 (aged 26); Bautzen
- Burial place: Kreba
- Other names: Hendrich Božidar Wjela
- Education: Dresden Academy of Fine Arts
- Occupation: landscape painter
- Known for: position at Tsar Alexander I's Imperial Academy of Arts
- Notable work: expedition to Russia's Asian possessions
- Parents: Johann Wehle (father); Rahel Dorothea (mother)

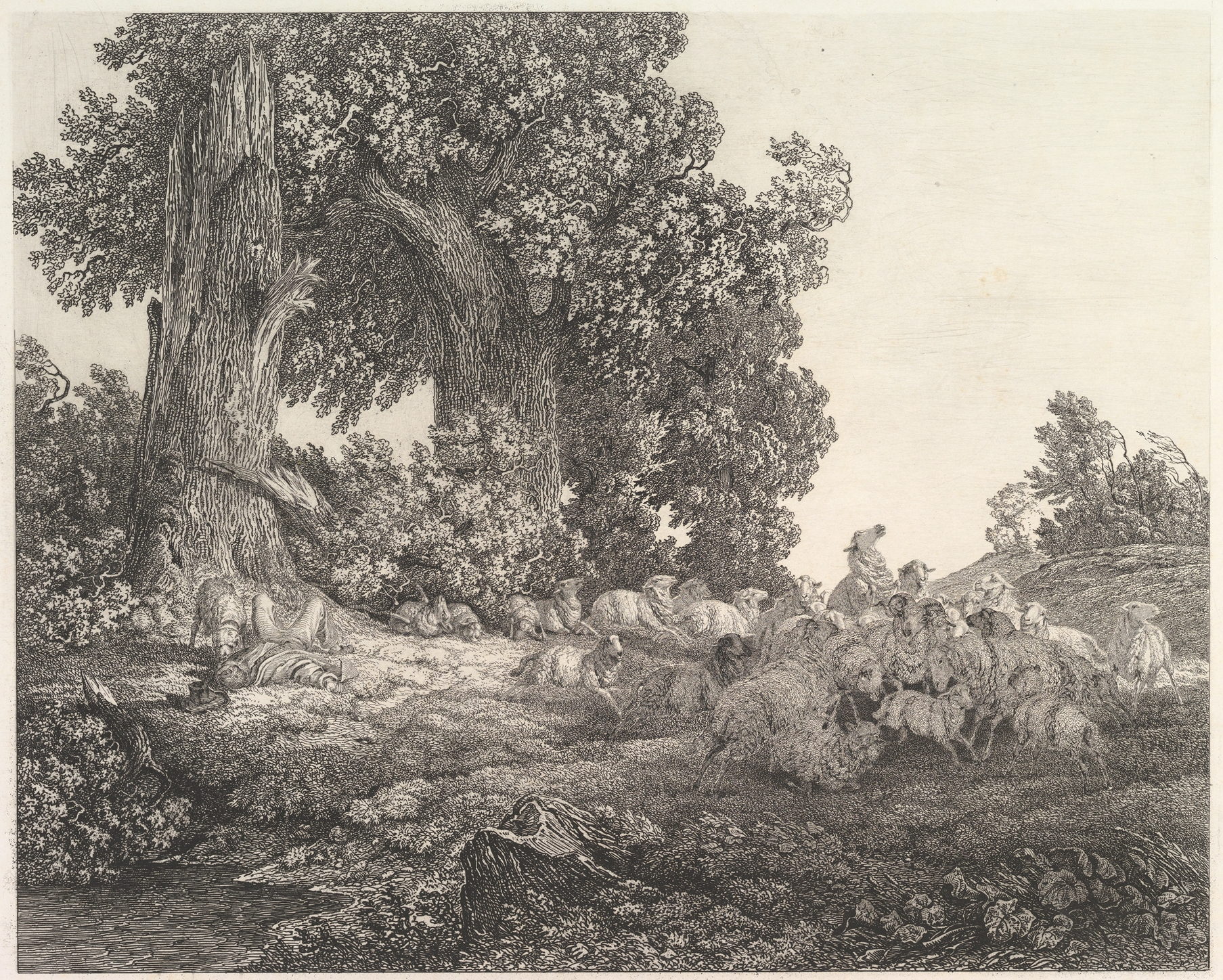
Arcadian Landscape with Shepherd and Sheep

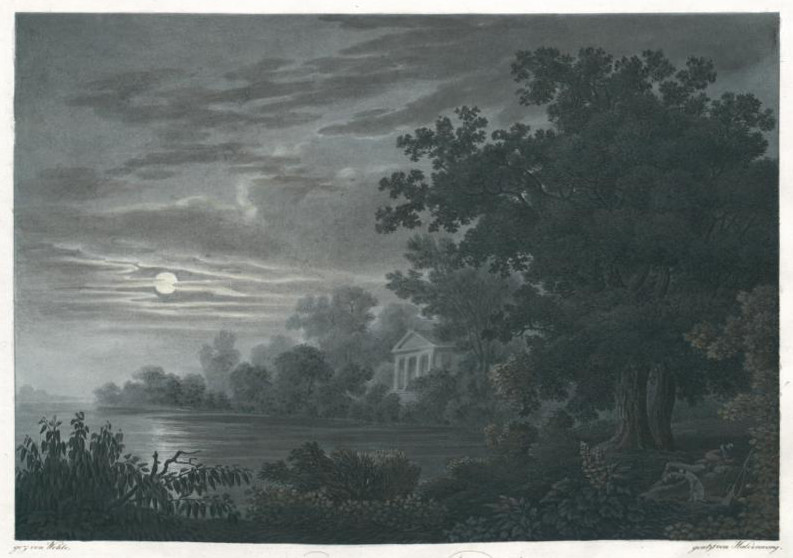
On the Banks of the Elbe; after Haldenwang

Heinrich Theodor Wehle, or Hendrich Božidar Wjela, in Sorbian (7 March 1778 in Förstgen, Görlitz – 1 January 1805, Bautzen) was a German-Sorbian landscape painter and etcher.

== Life and work ==
His father, Johann Wehle, was a pastor. His mother, Rahel Dorothea, was a daughter of Heinrich Gottlob Rieschke, the financial administrator of Görlitz. In 1782, his family moved to Kreba, when his father was assigned to the parish there.

He received his first lessons around 1790, at the local drawing school. Later, he studied with the landscape engraver, Christoph Nathe. Finally, he attended the Dresden Academy of Fine Arts, where he learned history painting from Giovanni Battista Casanova, and continued his landscape studies with Johann Christian Klengel. His academic achievements led to his being hired as a draftsman at the Chalkographische Gesellschaft zu Dessau, a publishing company, in 1799. As an enthusiastic horseman, he sold many of his works for only a few Thalers, to rent horses at the stables outside Dessau.

In 1801, at the invitation of Russia's new Tsar, Alexander I, he took a position at the Imperial Academy of Arts. Soon, he received a commission to accompany an expedition to Russia's Asian possessions, led by the naturalist, Count Apollo Mussin-Pushkin, to document the exotic landscapes. They arrived in Georgia in 1802, and continued on to Persia.

As it turned out, he was not sufficiently fit to cope with the rigors of travelling in that area, and was forced to leave the expedition. He decided to return to Germany, but died in Bautzen before reaching his hometown. He was buried in Kreba, next to his father. A street in Bautzen is named after him.

== Sources ==
- Georg Kaspar Nagler: Neues allgemeines Künstler-Lexicon, 1851 (Digitalisat mit Werksverzeichnis)
- Hermann Arthur Lier (1910). "Wehle, Heinrich Theodor" . Allgemeine Deutsche Biographie (in German). Vol. 55. Leipzig: Duncker & Humblot. pp. 358–359.
- Alfred Krautz: Die abenteuerliche Reise des Malers Heinrich Theodor Wehle von der Spree bis zum Kaukasus, Domowina-Verlag, Bautzen 1992, ISBN 978-3-7420-0514-4
- Christina Bogusz, Marius Winzeler: Im Reich der schönen, wilden Natur. Der Landschaftszeichner Heinrich Theodor Wehle 1778–1805. (exhibition catalogue), Sorbischen Museum Bautzen, Anhaltischen Gemäldegalerie Dessau and the Kulturhistorischen Museum Görlitz, Domowina-Verlag, Bautzen 2005, ISBN 978-3-7420-2026-0
