= Jacob Binck =

German artist (1485–1568/1569)

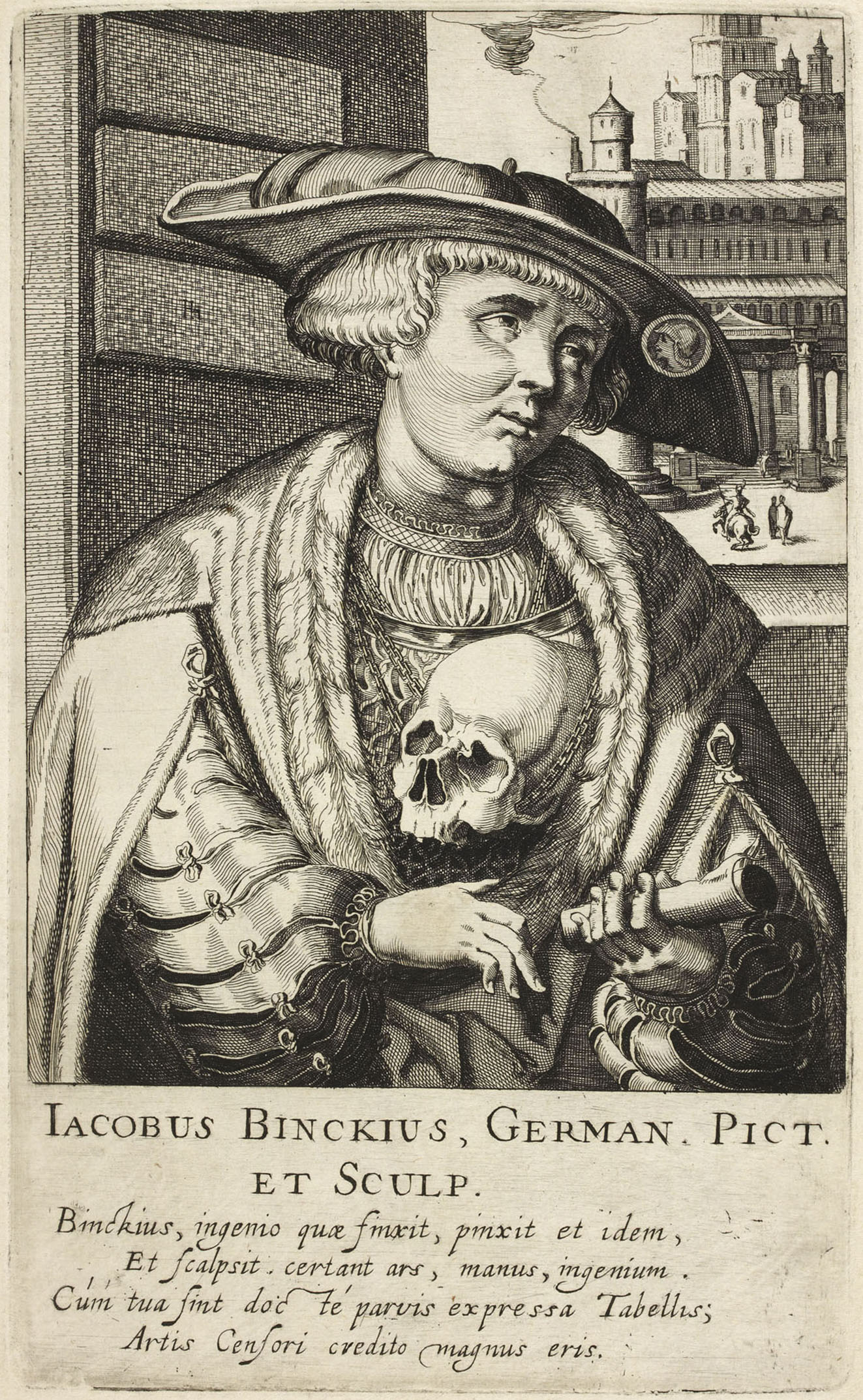
Portrait of Jacob Binck engraved after self-portrait by Simon Frisius

Jakob Binck (or Bink) (1485 – 1568/1569) was a German engraver, etcher, painter, medalist, copyist and art dealer. He was a peripatetic artist who worked for various courts in Northern Europe, especially the Danish court, and also resided in Antwerp for a while. As an engraver he is counted as a peripheral member of the Little Masters group.

== Life ==
Binck was born at Cologne between 1490 and 1504. From the earliest accounts of Binck, we must consider it probable that he was a pupil of Dürer, but this is by no means certain, while his early residence in Italy throws a doubt upon the supposition. He is also said to have worked under Marcantonio Raimondi in Rome. One of his largest plates is a rather feeble copy of the very popular Massacre of the Innocents by Raphael. Previous to the year 1546 he was appointed painter to King Christian III of Denmark, whose portrait and that of his wife Queen Dorothea, by him, are said to be at Copenhagen. He was also employed by Prince Albrecht of Brandenburg, who sent him in 1549 to the Netherlands, to erect a monument to the late Princess. Binck now received a fixed annual salary from Albrecht, and moved to Königsberg with his wife and family. He died in Königsberg about twenty years later, in 1568 or 1569.

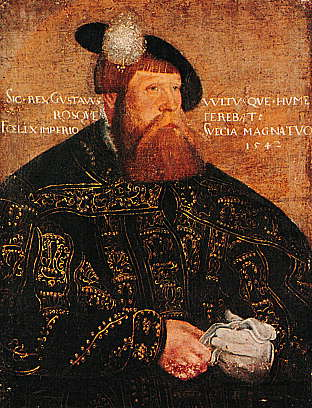
Portrait of Gustav I of Sweden, 1542 (possibly a later copy). Now in the Uppsala University's art collection.

All his known paintings are portraits. In the Garderobe at Königsberg are those of 'Prince Albrecht' and his 'First Wife,' and his own portrait is in the Belvedere, Vienna. Binck's pictures are remarkable for correctness of drawing and general artistic taste. His style is very neat, sometimes resembling the works of H. Aldegrever, but his plates evince less mastery in the execution. His drawing is correct, and there is an agreeable taste in the turn of his figures. There has existed considerable confusion respecting the marks of the artists of this period, particularly those whose names commence with a B. The works of this master are generally marked with a cipher, the C meaning Coloniensis. Several other engravers used the initials I. B., one of whom, very skilful indeed, and possessed of much invention, is mistaken by Sandrart for Bink.

== Works ==
The following are his principal prints:

- The Portrait of Jacob Bink, with a cap, a skull in his cloak, and a cup in his right hand.
- The Portrait of Lucas Gassel; I. B. 1529. Inscribed Imago ab Jacob Binck ad vivum delineata.
- Portrait of Francis I; Franciscus rex Franciae.
- Portrait of Claude, First Queen of Francis I. 1528.
- Christiernus II. Danorum Rex. 1525.
- Elisabeta Danorum Begina.
- Christian III, surrounded by nine shields of arms and six Cupids, is one of his most elaborate and excellent engravings. It is rare, and not in Bartsch's catalogue.
- St. Jerome, with the Lion.
- Twenty, representing the Divinities; copied after Caralius, who engraved these plates after Il Rosso.
- Adam holding the branch of a tree.
- Eve, with a branch with two apples.
- Lot and his Daughters; circular; marked twice.
- David, with the head of Goliath. 1526.

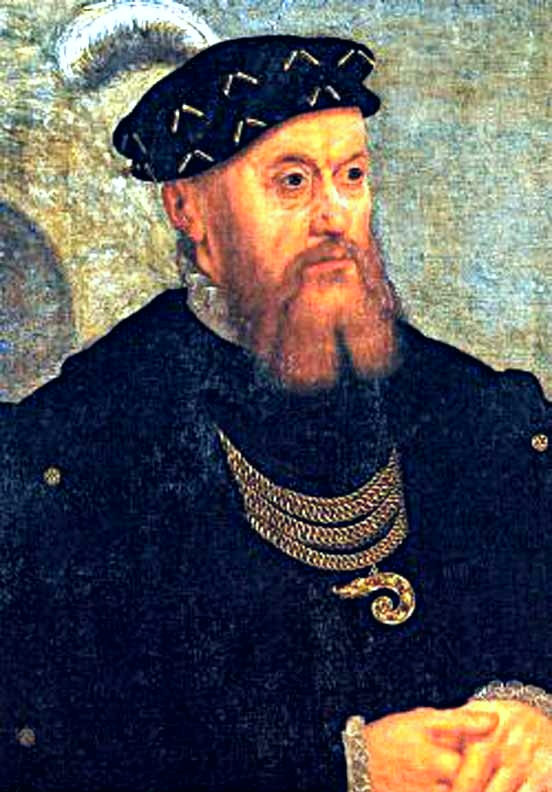
Portrait of Christian III of Denmark.

- Judith, with the head of Holofernes.
- St. Michael vanquishing the Evil Spirit.
- The Virgin Mary adoring the Infant Jesus in the manger.
- Virgin sitting on a bank.
- Saints, various small prints, including SS. Anthony, the Virgin with Catharine and Barbary, Magdalene, George.
- The Beheading of St. John.
- The Soldier struggling with Death. A fine design.
- Many subjects from fable and allegory, including Cupid, Venus, Hercules and Nessus, Pride, Fortune, Justice.
- The Massacre of the Innocents; copied after Marc' Antonio; very scarce; an inferior print.
- A Woman beating and driving away the Devil with her crutch. 1528.
- A painting of Gustav Vasa
- A Soldier and a young woman.
- A Peasant carrying a basket of eggs.
- A Peasant and woman dancing.
- A Vignette, four Cupids mounted on dolphins.
- A Vase, ornamented with the heads of two unicorns.

With about fifteen other ornamental trifles. His prints amount in number to 140, but many of them are copies from Dürer, Sebald Beham, and others.
