= Balthasar Anton Dunker =

German artist (1746–1807)

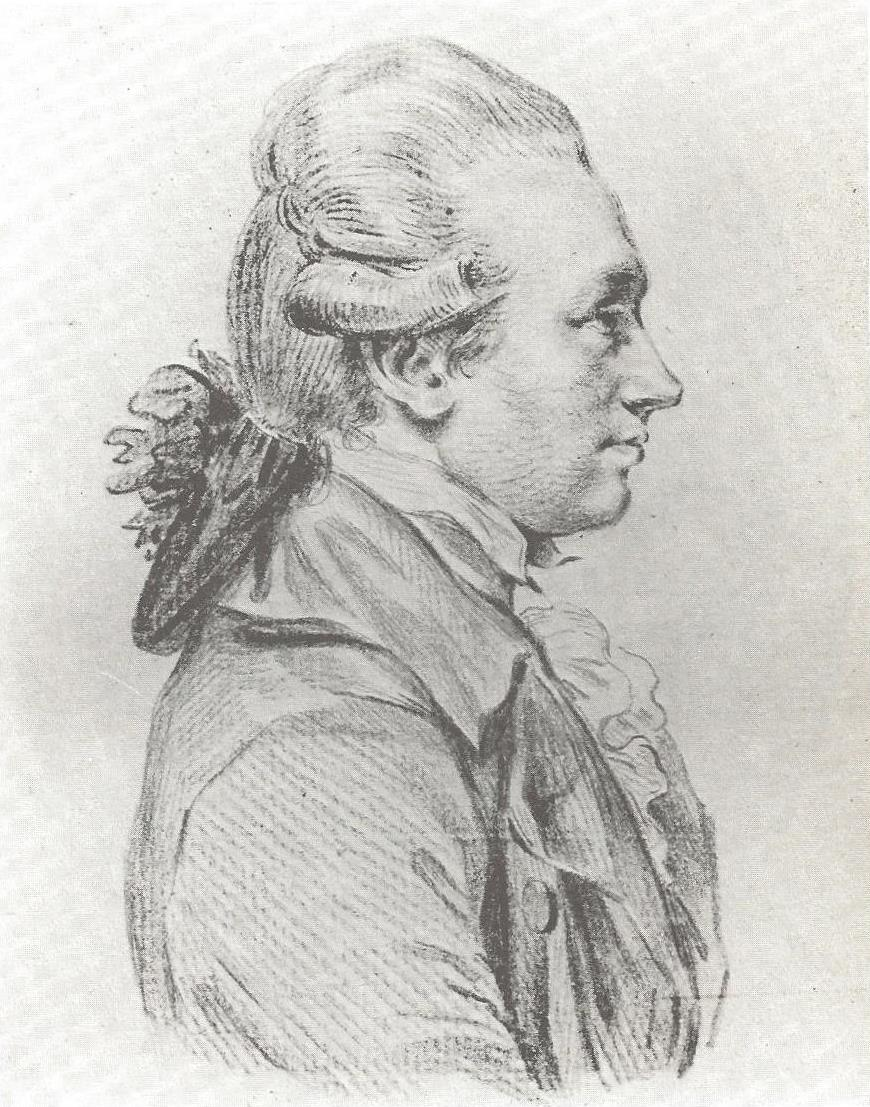
Balthasar Anton Dunker; portrait by Sigmund Freudenberger

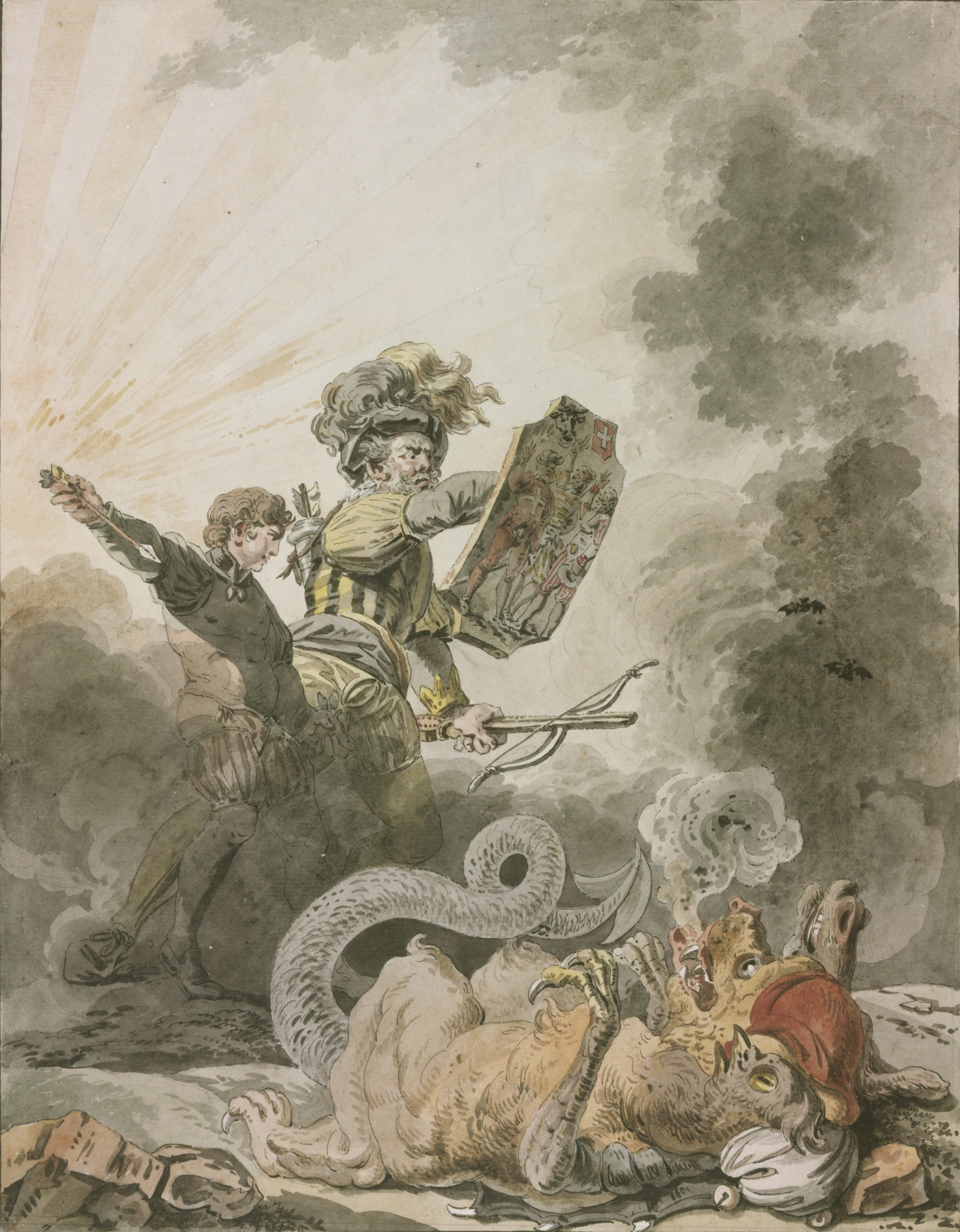
William Tell fights the revolution, drawing with aquarel colours, 1798, now in the Swiss National Museum

Balthasar Anton Dunker (15 January 1746, Saal – 2 April 1807, Bern) was a German landscape painter and etcher.

== Biography ==
He was the eldest son of pastor Albert Andreas Duncker (1706–1781) and his second wife, Sophie Dorothea von Olthof (d.1761). His early artistic career was promoted by his uncle, Adolf Friedrich von Olthof, a Swedish Pomeranian Councilor from Stralsund, who arranged for him to study with the landscape painter Jakob Philipp Hackert. In 1765, Hackert took him to Paris and, after the Olthofs lost their fortune in 1768, took over his upbringing.

In addition to receiving lessons from Joseph Marie Vien and Noël Hallé, he was influenced by the work of the copper engraver, Johann Georg Wille. He also studied the basics of etching with Jacques Aliamet. His first commissions came from the art dealer, Jacques-Gabriel Huquier, and enabled him to support himself. His etchings for the personal gallery of Duke Étienne-François de Choiseul are considered to be his first major work.

In 1772, he went to Basel, to study with Christian von Mechel. Three years later, he married Johanna Franziska Fahrni, from Eriz. They had fifteen children; six of whom survived to adulthood, including Philipp Heinrich, who worked as a landscape painter and engraver in Nuremberg.

Following a disagreement between himself and Michel, he set out for Paris, but got only as far as Bern, Switzerland, where there was a thriving market for art and carvings. In 1777, he received his Bürgerrechte. He worked primarily as a landscape painter, artist and etcher, but also did portraits, caricatures, and bookplates. In addition he provided illustrations for two works by Louis-Sébastien Mercier: Tableau de Paris, and The Year 2440.

In the 1790s, his commissions decreased significantly, due to the unrest caused by the French Revolution. Between 1798 and 1800, he wrote and drew caricatures for several works that were critical of the Revolution's outcome; including bitter, satirical attacks on the city of Bern, for capitulating during the French Invasion.

His last years were spent in poverty.

== See also ==
- List of German painters

== Sources ==
- "Dunker, Balthasar Anton". SIKART Lexicon on art in Switzerland.
- Hans Herzog (1904). "Dunker, Balthasar Anton". Allgemeine Deutsche Biographie (in German). Vol. 48. Leipzig: Duncker & Humblot. pp. 169–170.
- Henriette Mentha Aluffi (1990), Kunstmuseum Bern (ed.), Balthasar Anton Dunker 1746–1807 (in German), Bern
- Adolf Thürlings: Zur Erinnerung an Balthasar Anton Dunker, 1746–1807. Eine Auslese aus seinen Gedichten nebst einigen seiner Vignetten. Bern 1907.
