= Johann Ludwig Aberli =

Swiss painter and etcher (1723–1786)

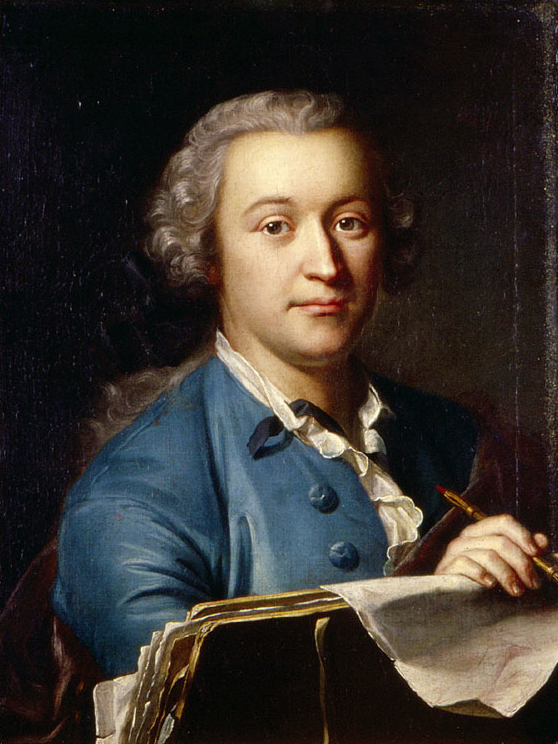
- Johann Ludwig Aberli: portrait by Jakob Emanuel Handmann
- Born: 14 November 1723; Winterthur, Switzerland
- Died: 17 October 1786 (aged 62); Bern, Switzerland
- Known for: Painting, etcher
- Spouse: Christina Barbara Janss

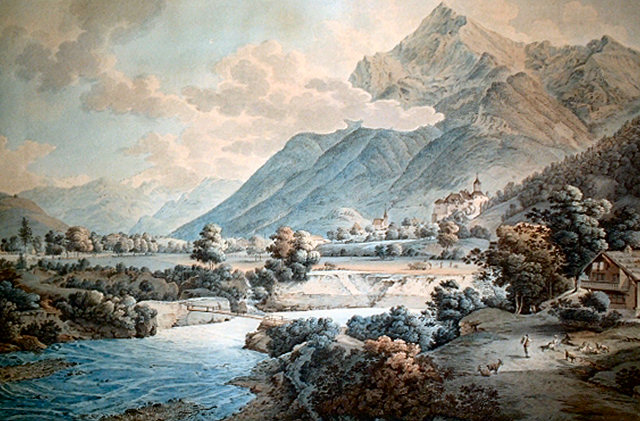
Wimmis (engraving, around 1783)

Johann Ludwig Aberli (14 November 1723 – 17 October 1786) was a Swiss painter and etcher.

== Biography ==
Aberli was born on 14 November 1723, in Winterthur. His father was a watchman. After completing his basic education, he became the student of a local artist named Heinrich Meyer. With his recommendation, in 1741, Aberli was accepted at the drawing school operated by Johann Grimm. While studying there, he worked as a decorative painter.

In the mid-1740s, he and Philipp Hieronymus Brinckmann took a trip through the Bernese Oberland, which stimulated his interest in painting landscapes. In 1747, he married Christina Barbara Janss, from Saanen. They had only one daughter, who died young. That same year, he succeeded his former teacher Grimm as operator of the drawing school. He often took his students on trips to lake Geneva, Lake Biel, Lake Neuchâtel, and the Oberland.

He established his own workshop in the 1750s, together with a publishing company to issue his works. He also trained his employees, including the engraver, Adrian Zingg, and the vedutist, Samuel Hieronymus Grimm. In 1759, he took them to Paris, to study the Old Masters at the museums, and to show them the famous engraving workshop of Johann Georg Wille.

After returning from Paris, he had a small summer house built in Köniz and began collecting art. His greatest financial success came with copper engravings, but he also made a decent profit on his watercolours. In order to reproduce them, he developed an etching method that came to be known as the "Aberlische Manier".

In 1774, he travelled throughout the Jura Mountains with his colleague, Sigmund Freudenberger. He was visited by Johann Wolfgang von Goethe, on his second trip to Switzerland in 1779.

He died on 17 October 1786, aged 62, in Bern. His business operations were continued by the artist, Heinrich Rieter, while the remainder of his estate was auctioned off. A street in Biel is named after him.

== Sources ==
- Frédéric-Charles Lonchamp: J.-L. Aberli (1723-1786). Son temps, sa vie et son oeuvre avec un catalogue complet, méthodique et raisonné a) de son oeuvre gravé; b) de l'oeuvre gravé de ses interprétateurs; c) de ses peintures et de ses dessins (crayons, aquarelles, esquisses, etc.), Paris 1927.
- Wilhelm Adolf Schmidt (1875). "Aberli, Johann Ludwig" . Allgemeine Deutsche Biographie (in German). Vol. 1. Leipzig: Duncker & Humblot. p. 20.
- "Aberli, Johann Ludwig". SIKART Lexicon on art in Switzerland.
- "Aberli, Johann Ludwig" in German, French and Italian in the online Historical Dictionary of Switzerland.
