= Dunc Dindas =

Turkish graffiti artist

Tunç Dindaş, who goes by the nickname "Turbo", is a Turkish graffiti artist who does most of his work in Istanbul, Turkey. His work has appeared in corporate offices, commercials, and in multiple neighborhoods of Istanbul. The style he champions is unique for Turkish art in the sense that it combines New York style subway art with bubble lettering. Many know him as the most popular graffiti artist in Istanbul.

== Career ==
Dindas began painting graffiti since 1985, when rap and graffiti, specifically subway art, were becoming extremely popular in the United States. He was arrested in 1989 for painting what police thought was political propaganda and was sentenced to five years in prison. While the graffiti scene in Istanbul is relatively small compared to other cities like New York, Dindas leads the scene, and has gained a reasonable sized following.

His art includes animal caricatures and bubble letters. His style is considered to be street art, a cultural phenomenon that is popular throughout the world. He targets mostly the younger “hip” crowd.

Graffiti art has become a business for Dindas, as he even has a manager to help him organize his corporate projects. Many companies in Turkey ask him to do specific projects because he adds a rebellious touch to corporate culture that usually appeals to the young and fashionable consumer base that many companies are interested in targeting. Some of his projects were done for large companies, including Samsung, Bellona, and Coca-Cola. Many of these projects can be found in some of his YouTube videos. While he enjoys the anonymity of being called by his nickname “Turbo,” unlike artists like Banksy, he has released his real name because it helps him secure commercial deals.

Turbo uses social media platforms, Tumblr and Facebook, to show his fans his most recent graffiti projects.
