= Johann Adam Klein =

German painter and engraver (1792–1875)

- Engraved portrait of Johann Adam Klein by Paul Barfus (1823–1895)
- Born: 24 November 1792; Nuremberg, Free Imperial City of Nuremberg
- Died: 21 May 1875 (aged 82); Munich, German Empire
- Education: Academy of Fine Arts Vienna
- Known for: Painter and engraver
- Movement: Romanticism
- Spouse: Karoline Wüst (m. 1823)

Johann Adam Klein (24 November 1792 – 21 May 1875) was a German painter and engraver.

== Biography ==
Johann Adam Klein was born in Nuremberg. At the age of eight, he received his first drawing lessons from the landscape etcher, Georg Christoph von Bemmel (1765–1811). From 1802, he attended the Nuremberg drawing school, under Gustav Philipp Zwinger. Three years later, he became an apprentice in the studios of the copper engraver, Ambrosius Gabler, who taught him etching. Gabler noticed that he had a special talent for drawing animals, so he sent him to the cattle market to sketch.

With support from the art dealer, Johann Friedrich Frauenholz, he went to Vienna in 1811, where he enrolled at the Academy of Fine Arts. Inspired by the Napoleonic Wars, he drew and etched the soldiers of the warring parties, in their uniforms and with their baggage, their horses and wagons, in great detail.

Back in Nuremberg in 1815, he made a survey of the Rhine with Count Erwein von Schönborn, a noted art collector. He was back in Vienna the following year, with his friend, the etcher Johann Christoph Erhard, where Prince Klemens Wenzel Lothar von Metternich became a patron and sent him to Hungary to study and sketch horses. He continued to travel, seeking inspiration for his works, visiting Styria and making his way to Italy, with the help of a grant from Prince Louis of Bavaria, where he was in contact with the German artists' colony in Rome.

He finally settled down in 1823, when he married Karoline Wüst, and remained in Nuremberg until her death in 1837. Shortly after, he moved to Munich where, in 1839, he married the widow of an engraver named Wolf. He remained there until his death in 1875.

== Gallery ==
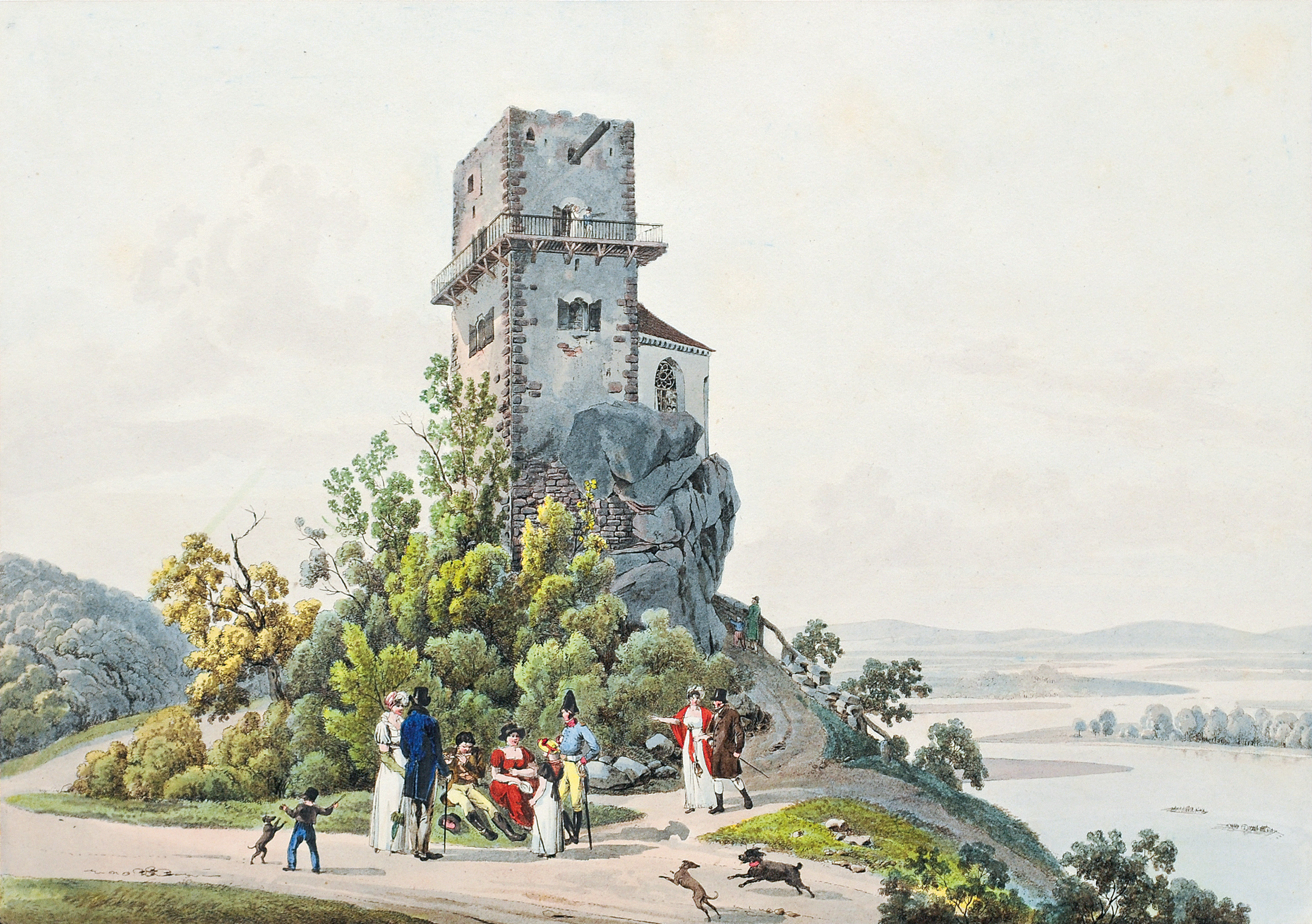
Burg Greifenstein on the Danube, colored etching, 1812, Kunstmuseum Liechtenstein, Vaduz

Austrian Peasants with Vienna in the Distance, watercolor over graphite, 1816-1818, Getty Center, Los Angeles

Insel Schütt with a view of the Schuldturm, 1809, priv. col.

Dairy Maid from Berchtesgaden, 1818, Los Angeles County Museum of Art, Los Angeles

Two saddled military horses, tied to a post, Städel, Frankfurt

Carousel at the Walpurgis Market on the Ehrenbürg Near Forchheim, 1816, Hamburger Kunsthalle, Hamburg

Don Cossacks, Leiden University Library, Leiden

Cattle near a river, Leiden University Library, Leiden

At the Laufen fountain in Bern, Swiss National Library

== Sources ==
- Constantin von Wurzbach: "Klein, Johann Adam." In: Biographisches Lexikon des Kaiserthums Oesterreich (Biographical Lexicon of the Empire of Austria). Part 12 Kaiserlich-königliche Hof- und Staatsdruckerei, Vienna 1864, p. 58 (digitalised).
- Rudolf Bergau (1882). "Klein, Johann Adam" . Allgemeine Deutsche Biographie (in German). Vol. 16. Leipzig: Duncker & Humblot. pp. 95–96.
- Klein, Johann Adam. In: Hans Vollmer (Ed.): Allgemeines Lexikon der Bildenden Künstler von der Antike bis zur Gegenwart, Vol.20: Kaufmann–Knilling. E. A. Seemann, Leipzig 1927, pp. 440–442.
- Johann Adam Klein 1792–1875. Zeichnungen und Aquarelle. Collection catalog of the Stadtgeschichtlichen Museen Nürnberg, Renate Freitag-Stadler (Ed.), Verlag Hans Carl, Nürnberg 1975. ISBN 3-418-00442-3
- Kurt Pilz (1977). "Klein, Johann Adam". Neue Deutsche Biographie (in German). Vol. 11. Berlin: Duncker & Humblot. pp. 741–742. (full text online).
- Romantische Entdeckungen – Johann Adam Klein (1792–1875). Gemälde, Zeichnungen, Druckgrafik. Exhibition catalog, Museen der Stadt Nürnberg, Nürnberg 2006. ISBN 3-921590-56-6
