= Dunk (mascot) =

Mascot of the National Security Agency

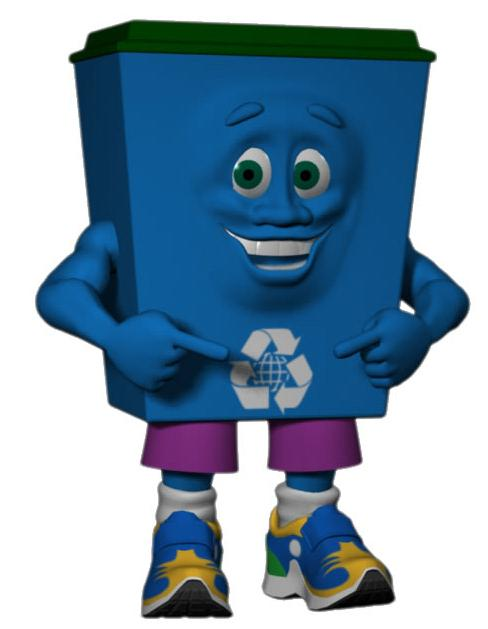
A picture of Dunk from the NSA website

Dunk is an anthropomorphic recycling bin who functioned as a mascot for the National Security Agency (NSA), in order to promote recycling. He debuted in 2015.

== Reception ==
Dunk was criticized for his rough CGI design. He was mocked on a segment of The Daily Show With Jon Stewart, described as "the stuff of nightmares" by The Verge, and as "terrifying" by USA Today.
