= Christoph Nathe =

German miniaturist, watercolorist and etcher

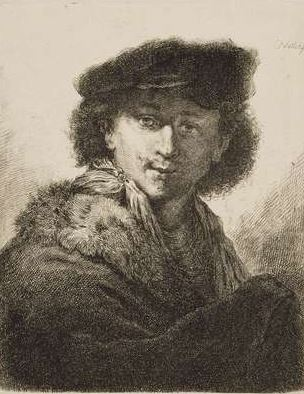
Self-portrait (date unknown)

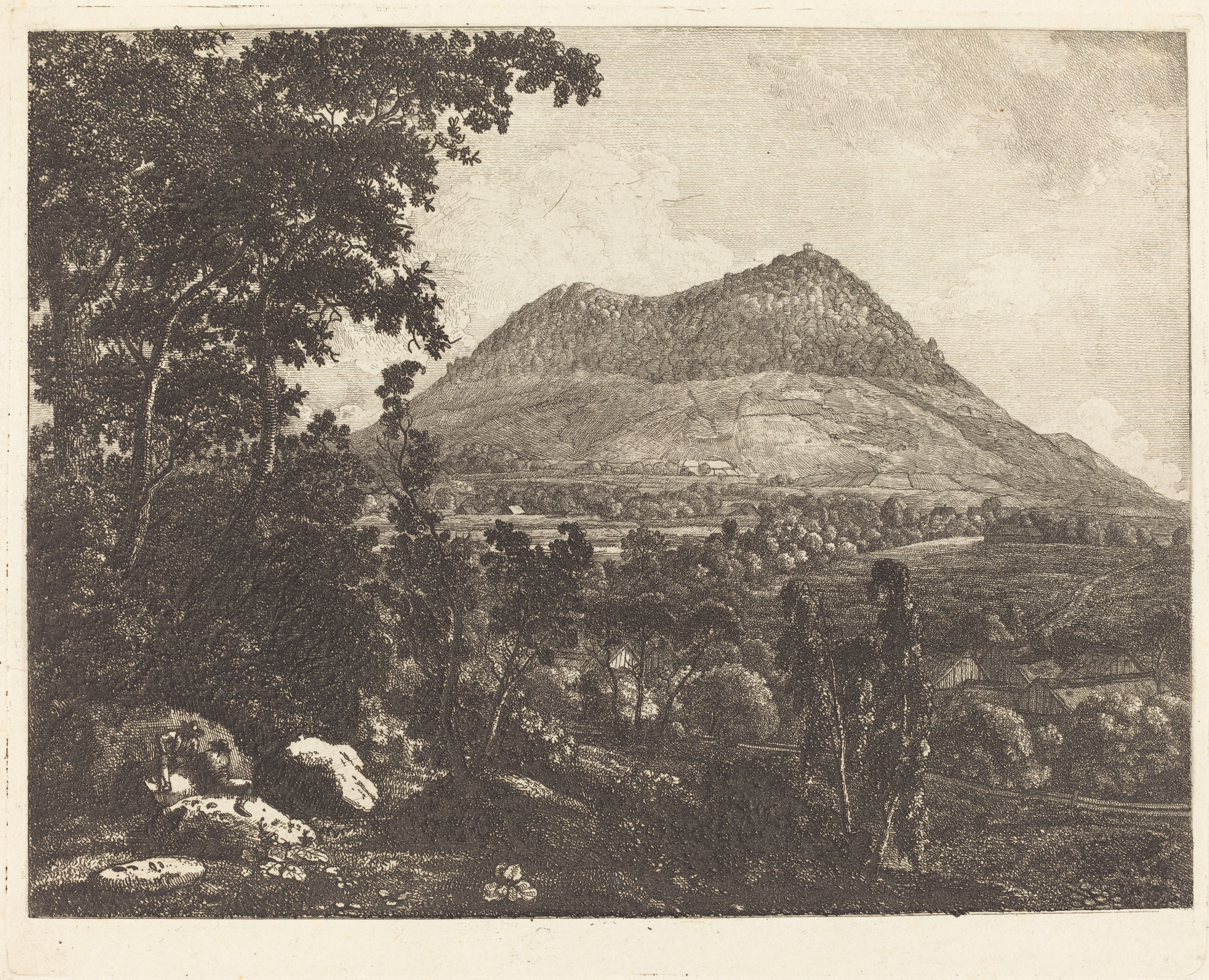
Landeskrone Mountain, near Görlitz

Christoph Nathe (3 January 1753, Nieder-Bielau - 10 December 1806, Schadewalde) was a German miniaturist, watercolorist and etcher.

== Life and work ==
He was born to a family of farmers. After completing his secondary education, he took his first drawing lessons from Johann Gottfried Schultz. His work was noticed by the naturalist, Adolf Traugott von Gersdorff, who became his patron. When Gersdorff went to Leipzig, In 1774, he made it possible for Nathe to study at the Academy of Fine Arts with Adam Friedrich Oeser. He also received professional advice from Johann Friedrich Bause, a portrait engraver.

From 1783 to 1784, he accompanied the ornithologist, Karl Andreas von Meyer zu Knonow (1744-1797), a relative of Gersdorff's, on an extensive tour of Switzerland, which he later described as the high point of his life. The drawings he created while there were in great demand in Leipzig.

Despite this, he felt that his financial situation was insecure so, in 1787, he left Leipzig to accept the position of Director at the Görlitz drawing school, and taught at the local gymnasium. He still travelled frequently, to acquire material for his drawings.

In 1795, he married one of his students; Caroline von Meyer, who was Gersdorff's niece and brought a small fortune with her. She died only three years later. In 1799, thanks to his improved finances, he was able to retire from his positions and move to Lauban. He continued to work, however; executing a series of views of the Riesengebirge for Queen Louise.

An old friend from the Leipzig Academy, Johann Christian Reinhart, invited him to come to Rome in 1801. He spent some time learning Italian, and intended to relocate there, but his plans never came to fruition. He died in 1806, while taking a short hike near Schadewalde.

The largest collection of his works is in the Graphische Kabinett at the Kulturhistorischen Museum Görlitz.

== Sources ==
- Biography and sources @ Sächsische Biografie
- Biography @ Kulturstiftung
- Ernst Scheyer: Christoph Nathe und die Landschaftskunst des ausgehenden 18. Jahrhunderts. Würzburg : Verl. Kulturwerk Schlesien, 1958
