= Little Masters =

Group of German printmakers

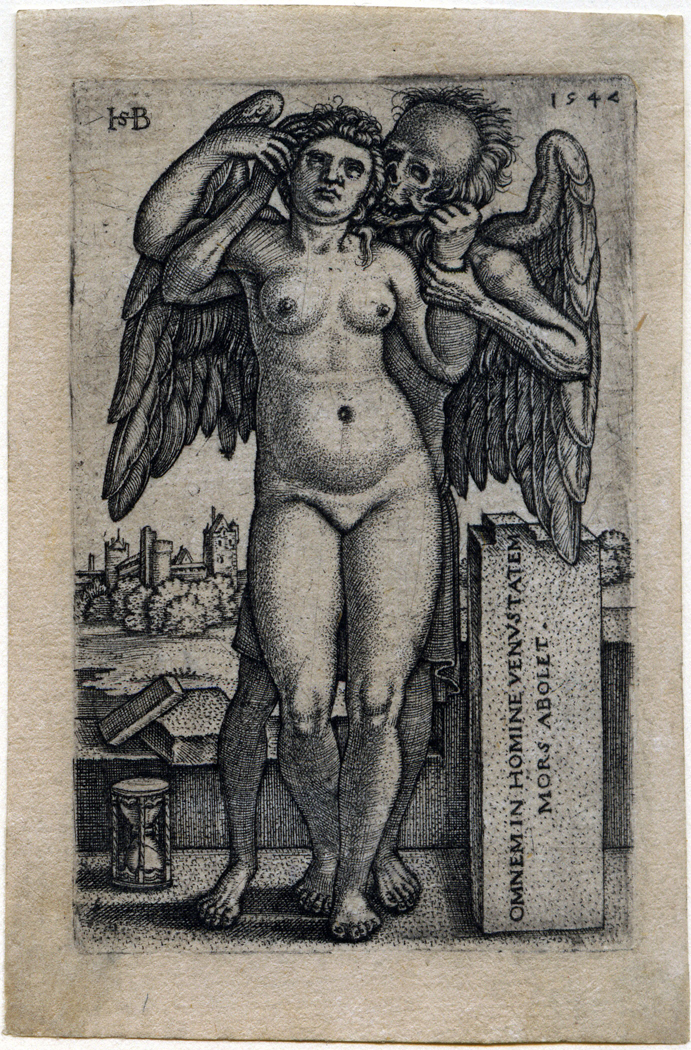
Death and the Standing Nude, 1547, by Hans Sebald Beham, 7.5 x 4.8 cm

The Little Masters ("Kleinmeister" in German), were a group of German printmakers who worked in the first half of the 16th century, primarily in engraving. They specialized in very small finely detailed prints, some no larger than a postage stamp. The leading members were Hans Sebald Beham, his brother Barthel, and George Pencz, all from Nuremberg, and Heinrich Aldegrever and Albrecht Altdorfer. Many of the Little Masters' subjects were mythological or Old Testament stories, often treated erotically, or genre scenes of peasant life. The size and subject matter of the prints shows that they were designed for a market of collectors who would keep them in albums, of which a number have survived.

The term Kleinmeister was used of the Nuremberg Little Masters as early as 1679, by Joachim von Sandrart, and has been applied to other groups of artists, from the genre masters of the Dutch Golden Age to a group of 6th-century BC Ancient Greek vase-painters.

== Artists ==
The earliest artist to make very small intricate engravings was Altdorfer in 1506–7, probably following the example of Italian niello prints, although their size was in fact no smaller than the bottom end of the very cheap devotional woodcuts made throughout the 15th century. However Altdorfer's printmaking developed in different directions, though he continued to produce some small engravings until the 1520s, by which time the style had been taken up by the Nuremberg artists, the Beham brothers and their close friend Pencz.

Hans Sebald Beham and Pencz continued to produce engravings until shortly before their deaths in 1550, which effectively ended the style; Barthel Beham had died in 1540. Barthel is generally considered the most inventive of the Nuremberg trio, but his brother Sebald was much more productive, with perhaps the finest technique, and also copied some of Barthel's prints after his death. Aldegrever was a convinced Lutheran who developed Anabaptist leanings, which perhaps led to him spending much of his time producing ornament prints with no human figures.

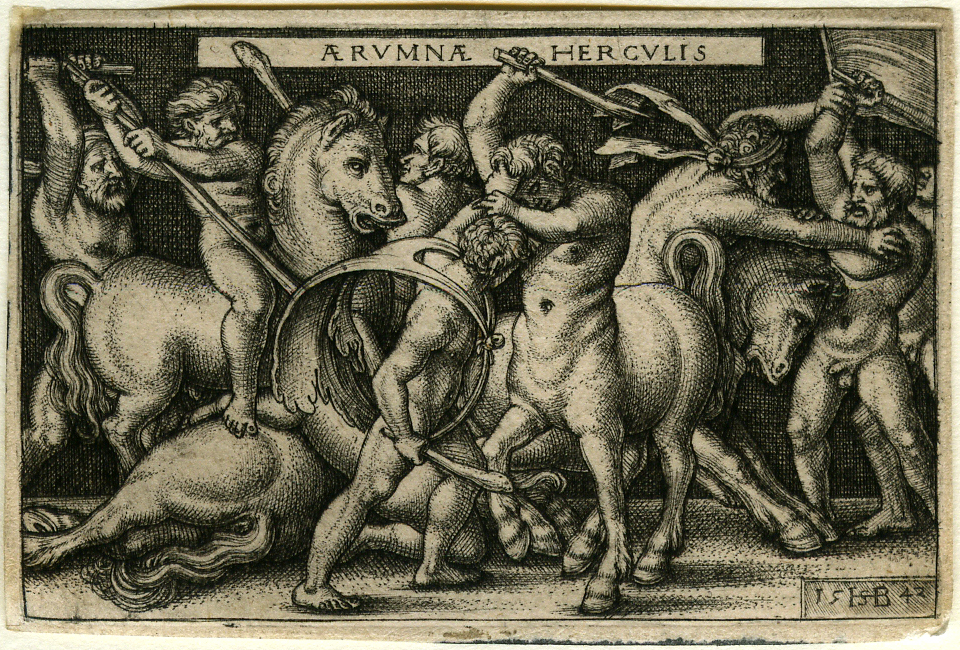
One of a series of tiny (about 5.1 x 7.9 cm) prints of the Labours of Hercules by Hans Sebald Beham; the Little Masters did not let small size deter them from tackling the largest subjects of history painting. The influence of the friezes of Polidoro di Caravaggio is seen here.

Their engraving style was based on the work of Nuremberg master printmaker Albrecht Dürer, who was still living in the city until 1528, and in whose workshop Pencz at least may have trained, and the Italian Marcantonio Raimondi, with whom Barthel Beham is supposed to have worked in Rome. Raimondi, and the exterior fresco friezes of Polidoro di Caravaggio, influenced their choice of subjects and compositional style, to which Northern themes of death (Death appears personified in many prints, as above) and humour are added. The prints of Hans Baldung Grien contain similar treatments of sexual themes.

Compared to their contemporaries, devotional subjects are notably absent in the work of the Nuremberg artists, who were all expelled from the city for their religious views in 1525 – an episode that still remains rather unclear. Their prints were very widely disseminated, and both drawn copies and examples of the originals have been found in albums from Mughal India, and their figurative compositions were copied in Limoges enamel and various other decorative media, from bronze plaques to stoneware pottery. In addition many of their prints were "ornament prints", consisting entirely of ornament in the Renaissance style, which as well as being collected were designed to be used as patterns for craftsmen in various media.

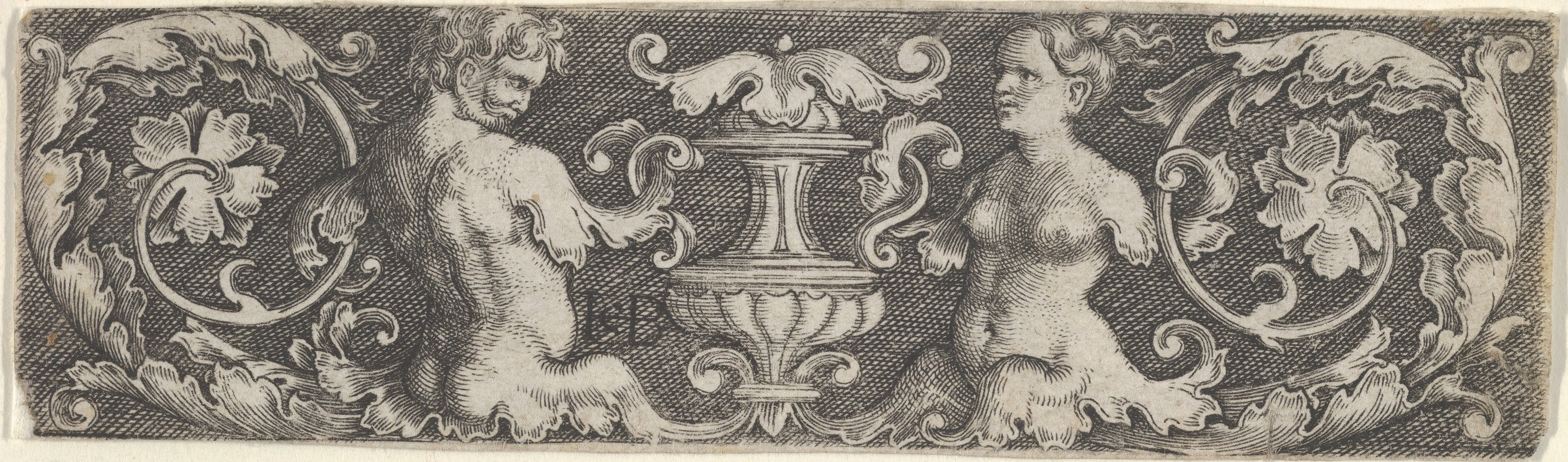
Ornament print by Jacob Binck, 2.4 × 8.4 cm.

Minor members of the group were Jacob Binck and Hans Brosamer, and there are some prints by a "Master IB", named after his monogram, who may be either Pencz, Sebald Beham, or a separate artist. Other artists who did some work on a similar small scale, but are not usually classified as part of the "Little Masters" group, include: Virgil Solis, Matthias Zundt, Jost Amman, and Conrad Saldörfer in Germany, Hans Holbein the Younger in Switzerland and England, and Dirk Vellert (in etching) and "Master S" in the Netherlands. The etched work of the Hopfer family is often similar in size and must have appealed to a similar market, as did the rather later work of the French printmaker Etienne Delaune.

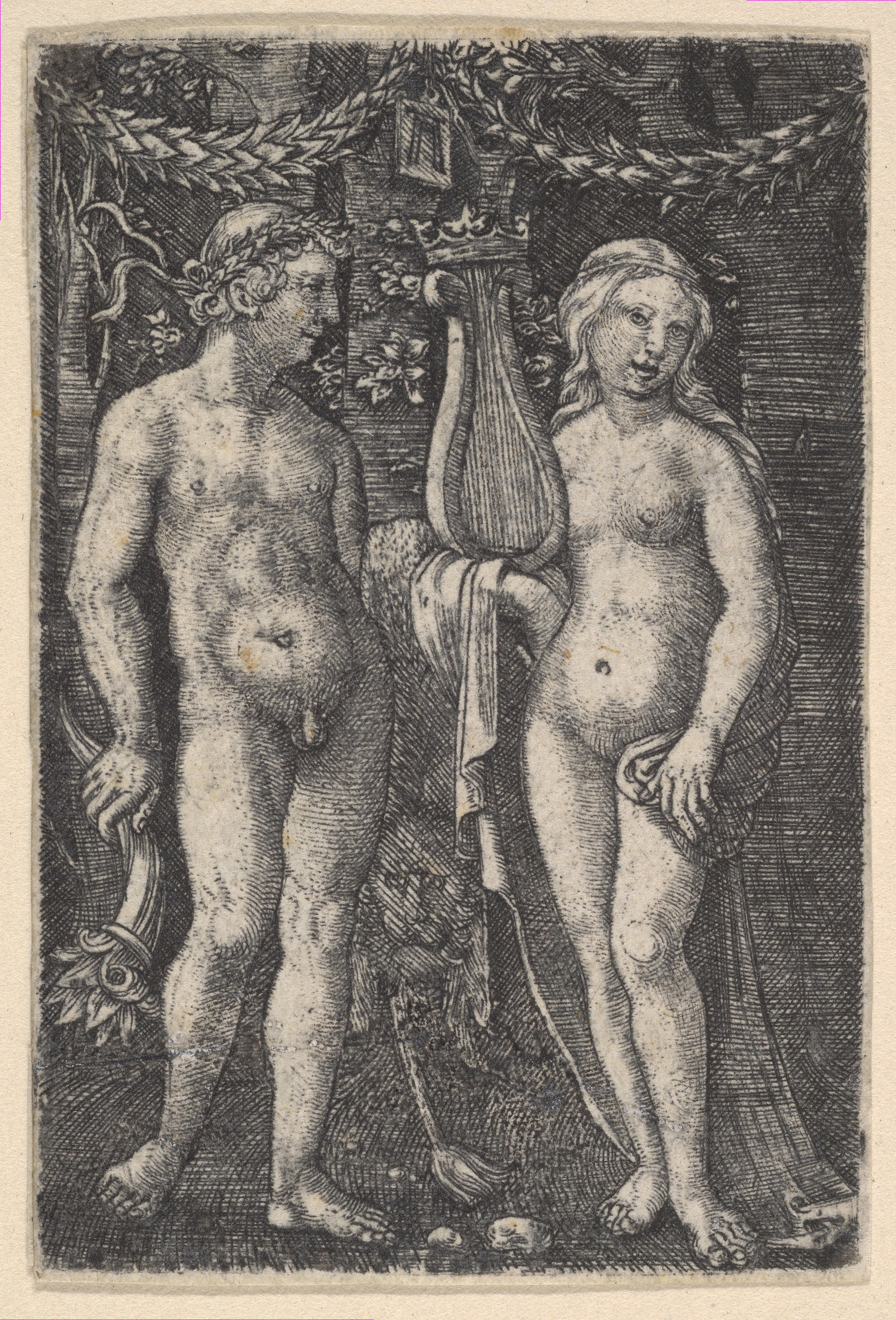
Albrecht Altdorfer, Hercules and a Muse, 7.8 × 4.5 cm.

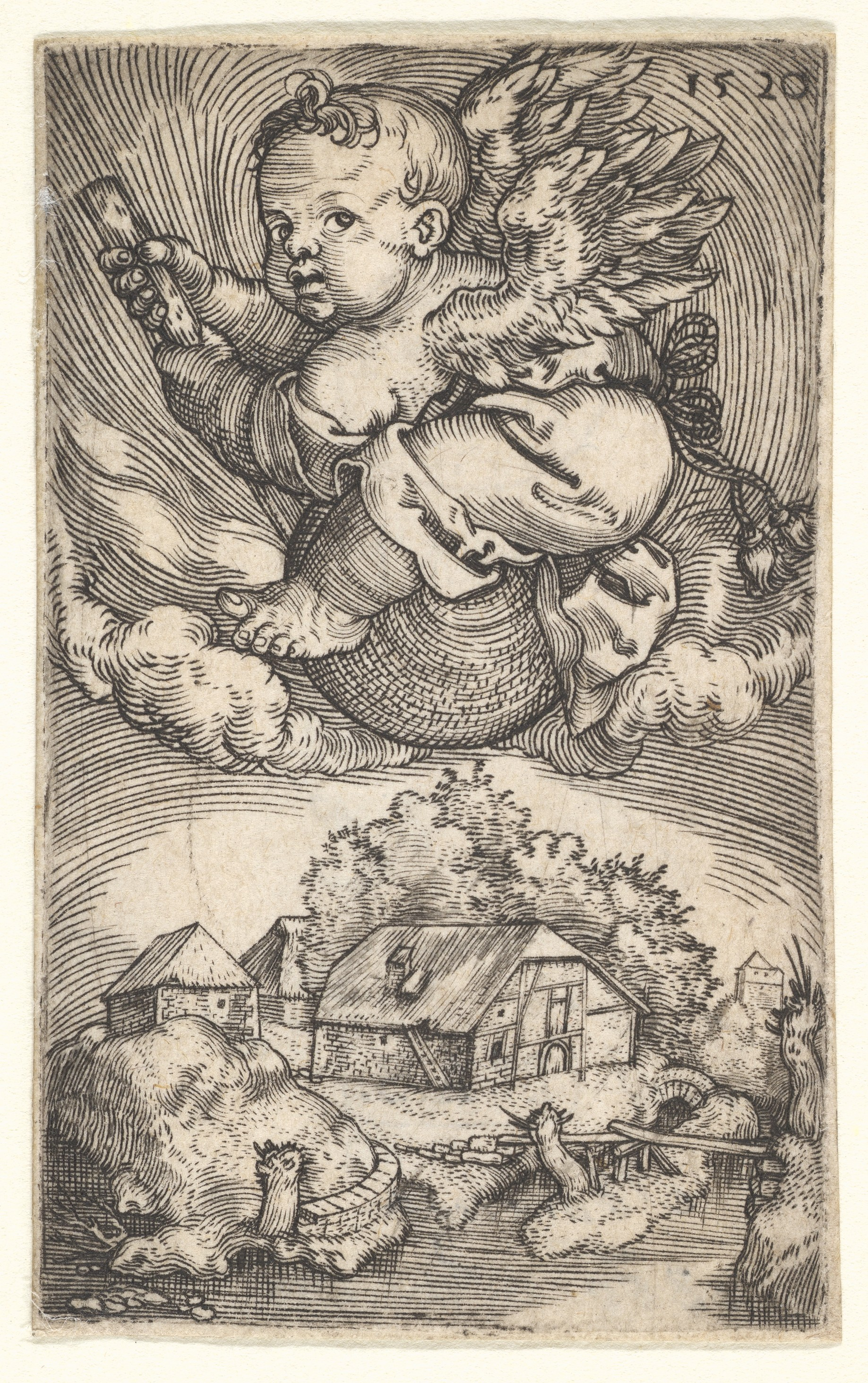
Barthel Beham, Genius on a Globe Floating in the Air, engraving, 1520, 5.7 × 3.6 cm, perhaps a parody of Dürer's Nemesis.

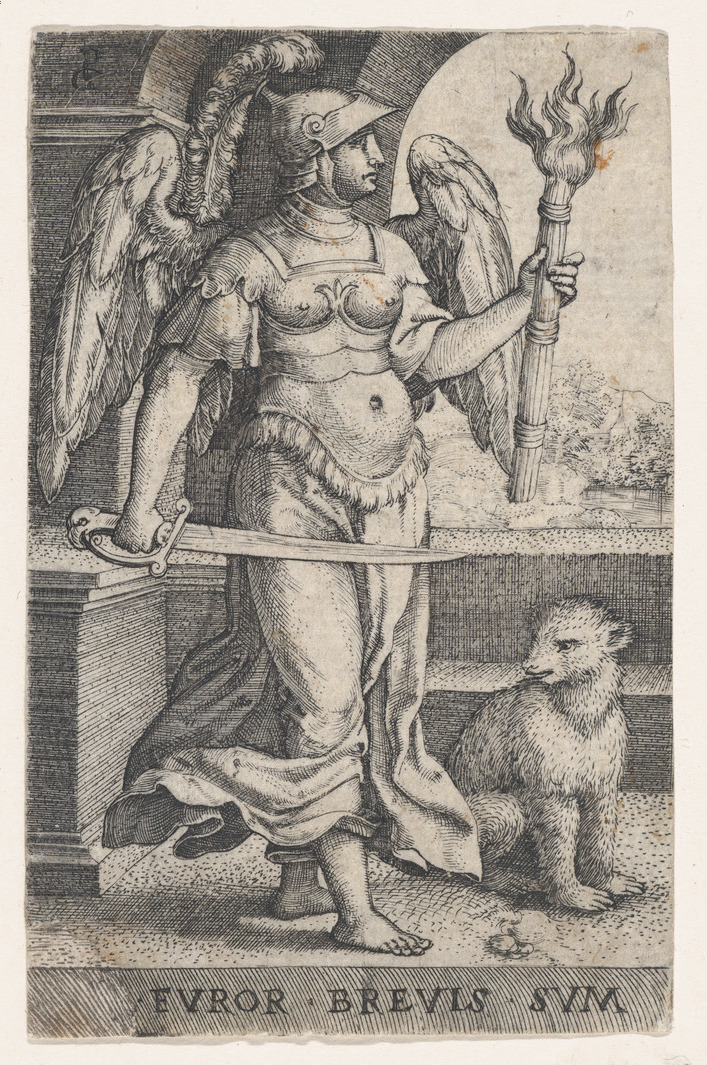
Georg Pencz, Wrath (Ira), from a set of The Seven Vices, 8.4 × 5.4 cm

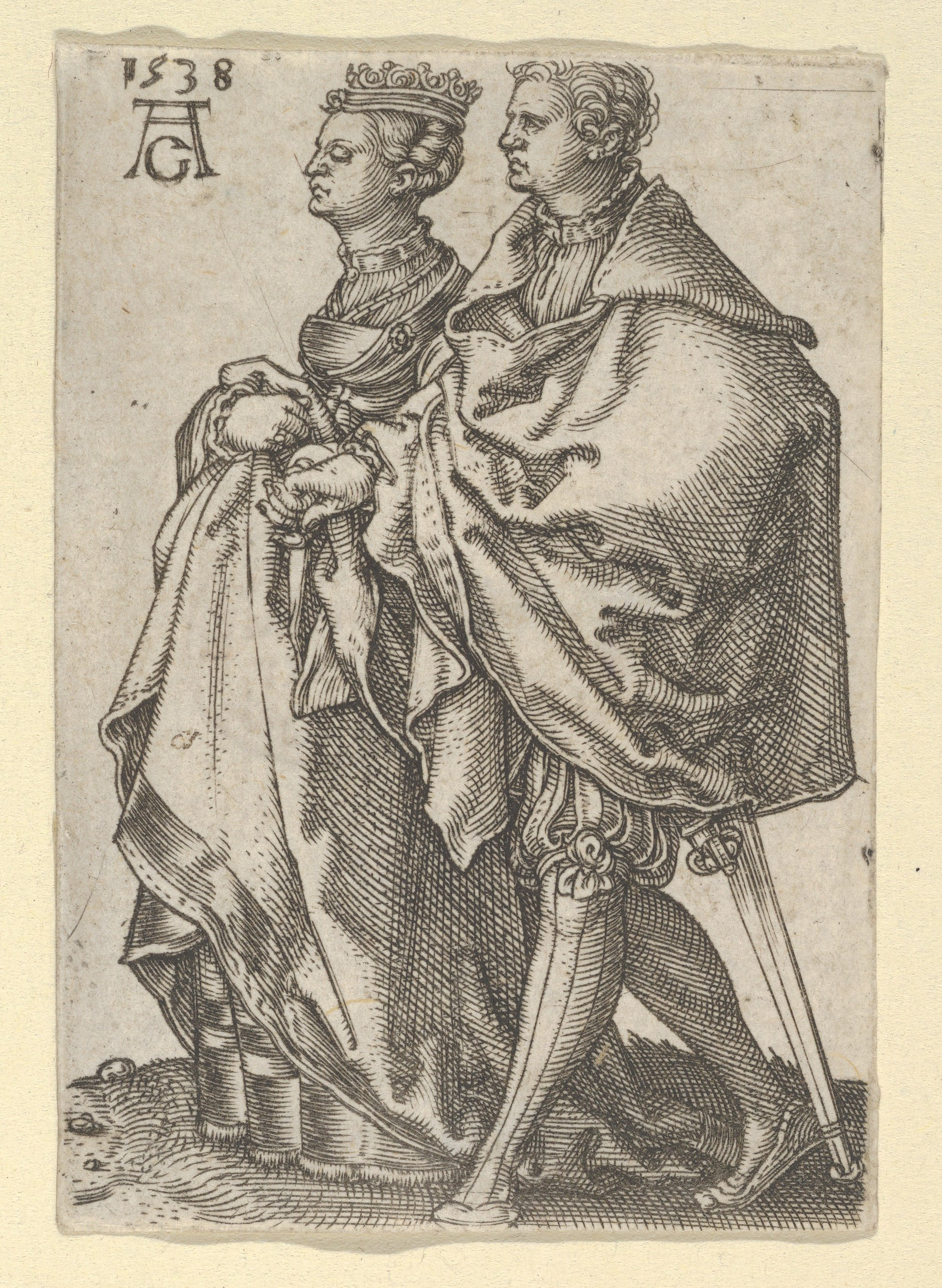
Heinrich Aldegrever, Dancing Couple from The Small Wedding Dancers set, 5.3 × 3.8 cm

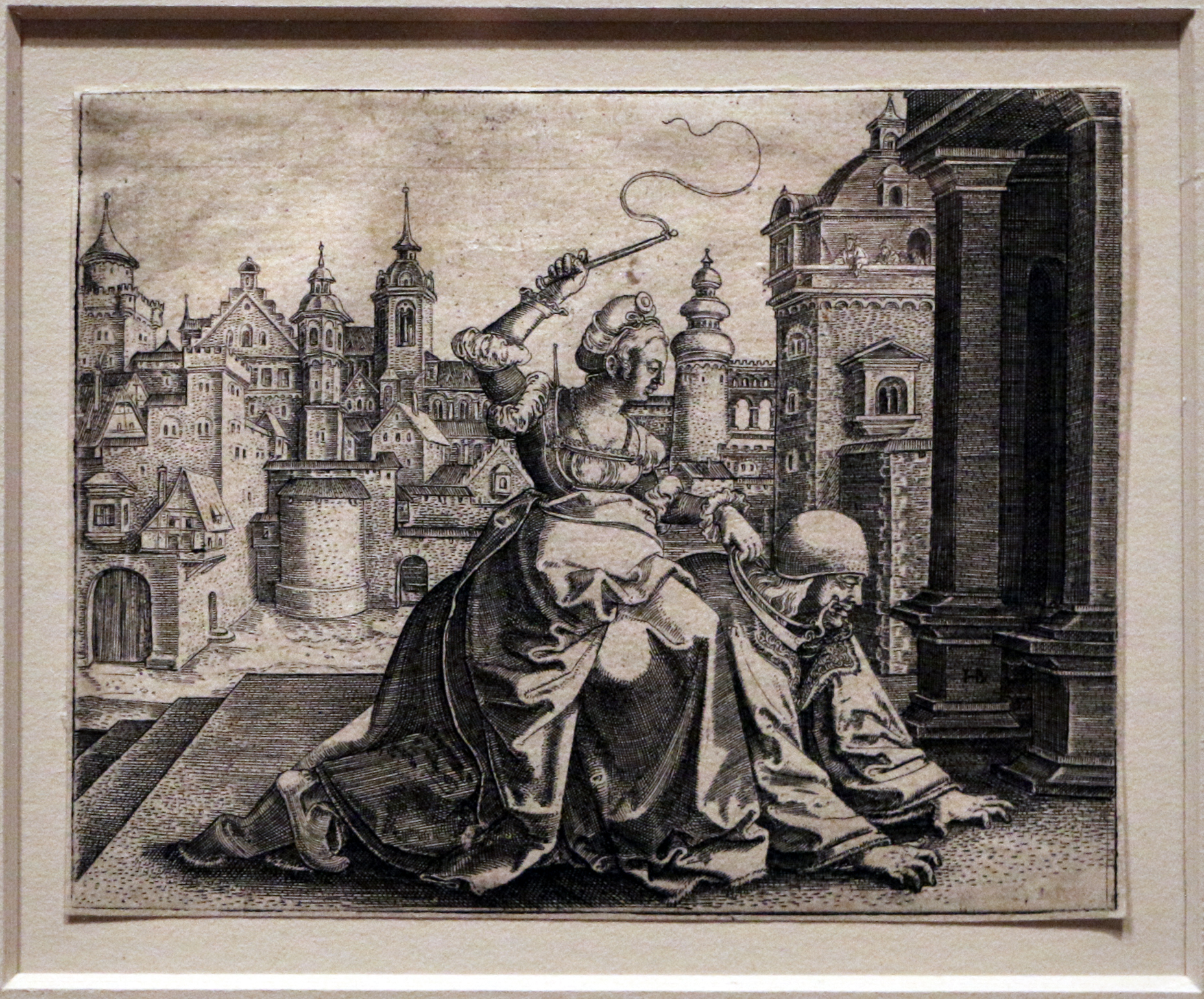
Hans Brosamer, Phyllis and Aristotle, c. 1545
