= Heinrich Aldegrever =

German painter and engraver (1502 – c. 1558)

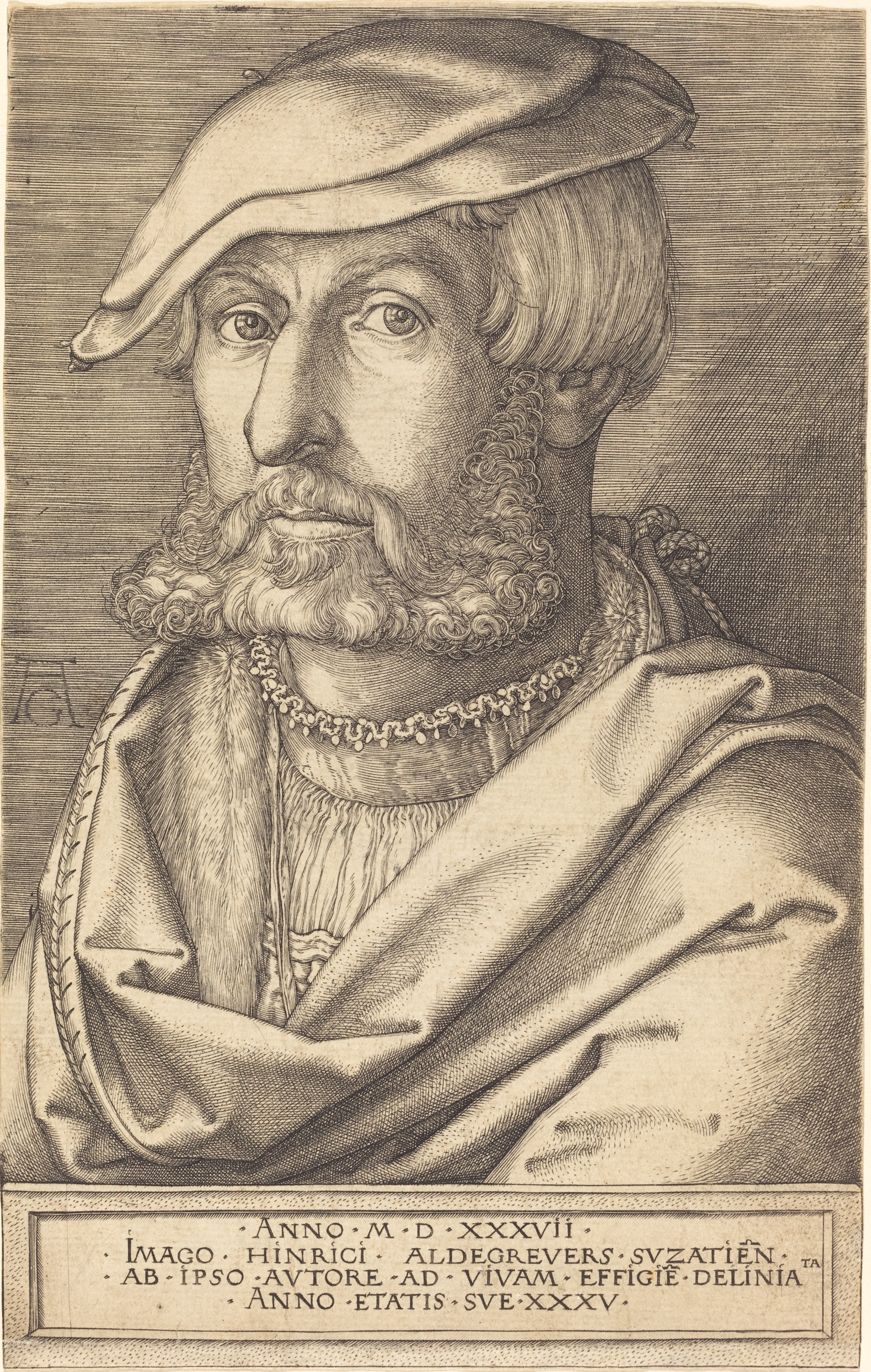
Heinrich Aldregrever, self-portrait

Heinrich Aldegrever or Aldegraf (1502–1555, 1558 or 1561) was a German painter and engraver. He was one of the "Little Masters", the group of German artists making small old master prints in the generation after Albrecht Dürer.

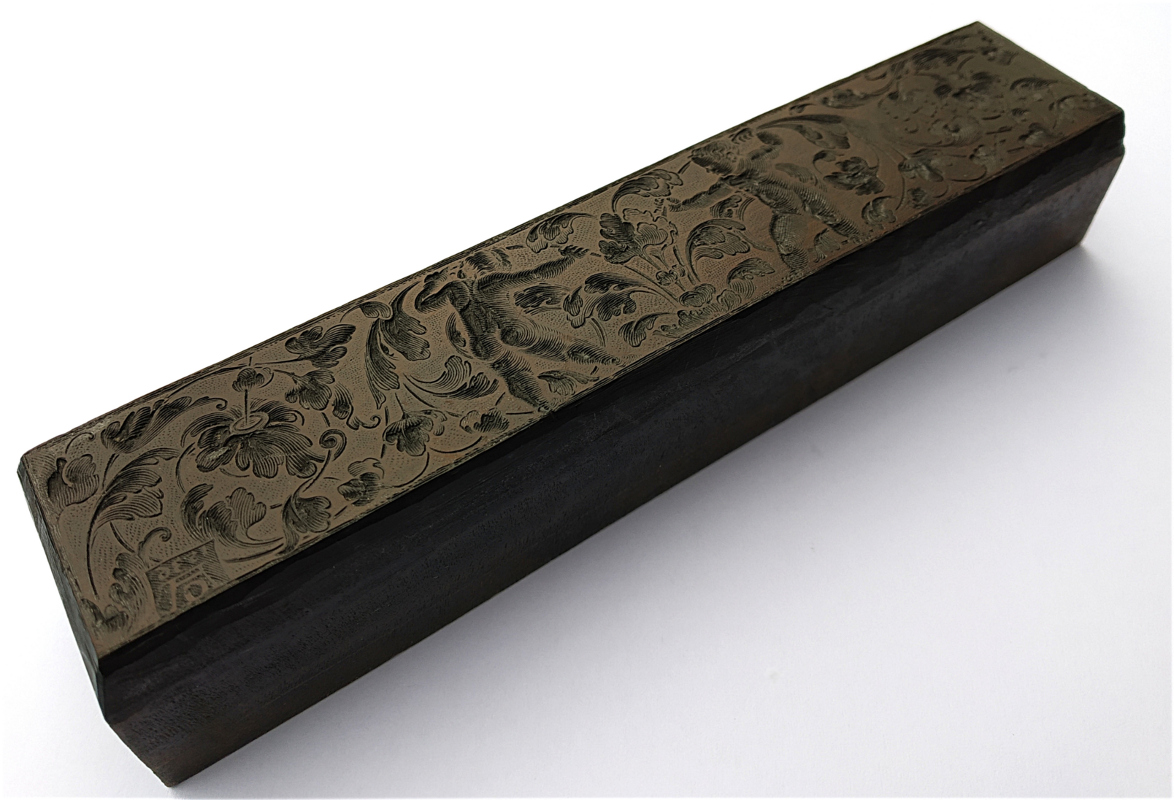
Heinrich Aldegrever engraved woodblock (1536)

== Biography ==
Aldegrever was a painter, printmaker and goldsmith active in a Westphalia milieu. He was born in Paderborn. His real name was Trippenmecker, which in Westphalian dialect means a clog-maker. It is not known where Aldegrever was taught. He probably worked in a workshop of one of the Soest goldsmiths. His early works show a strong Westphalian influence. Aldegrever made a journey to the Netherlands, where he became acquainted with works of Joos van Cleve, Barendt van Orley, Lucas van Leyden and Jacob Cornelisz.

Around 1525 he moved to Soest, where a year later he painted the wings and predella of the Mary altar for the church of St. Peter. His signature and symbolic clog show that he was still using his father's name.

His first engravings appeared in 1527. They were signed with a monogram "AG", resembling closely that of Albrecht Dürer. In 1531, influenced by surrounding religious fervour, he became a Lutheran. Because of lack of church commissions he devoted most of his time to portrait painting and printmaking. Aldegrever's some 290 engravings and woodcuts, chiefly from his own designs, are delicate and minute, though somewhat hard in style, and entitle him to a place in the front rank of the so-called "Little Masters": Barthel Beham, his brother Hans Sebald Beham, and Georg Pencz, with whom he is often compared. Like them, he was also a skilled ornament designer. From the close resemblance of his style to that of Albrecht Dürer he has also sometimes been called the "Albert of Westphalia".

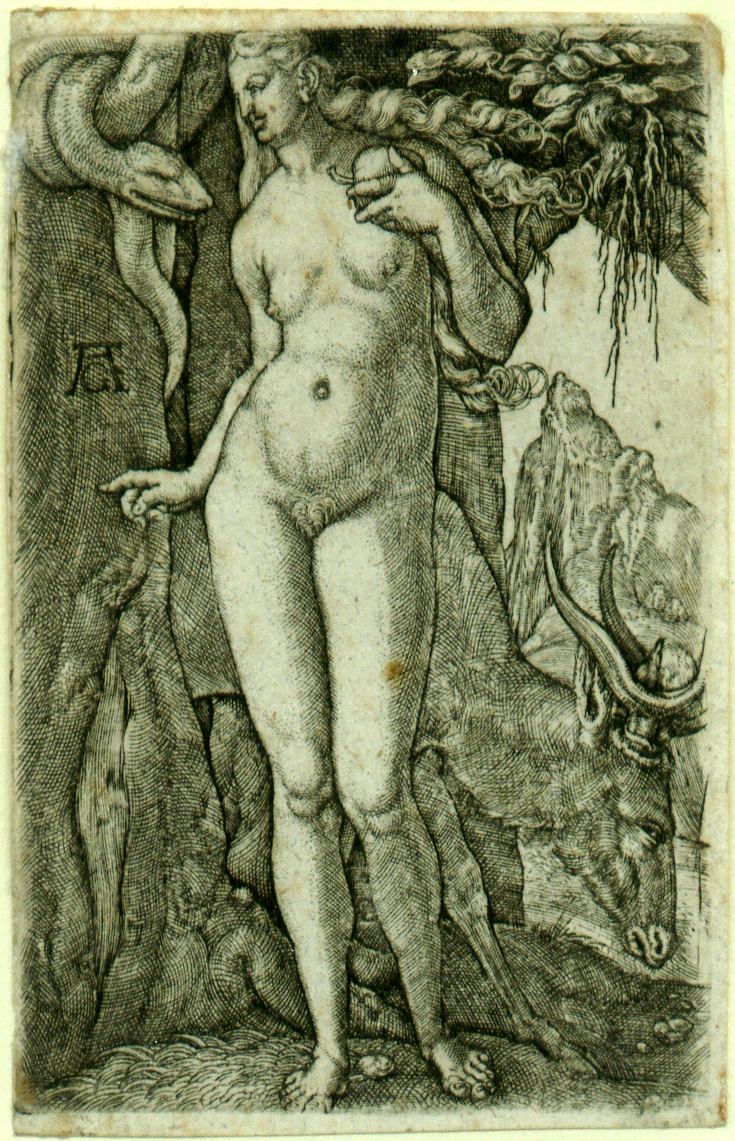
Eve with a Stag, c.1540

About a third of his prints were ornamental engravings; they were used as models by artists and craftsmen well into the seventeenth century.

Aldegrever, who actively supported the Reformation, executed portraits of Martin Luther and Philip Melanchthon. Although he chose the Lutheran Church, he had friends among the Anabaptists. He was commissioned by the bishop of Münster in 1535–36 to engrave portraits of Anabaptist leaders Jan van Leyden and Bernhard Knipperdolling, although they were already imprisoned, and only caricatures of them circulated. In the cycle Power of Death, done under visible influence of Hans Holbein, he criticizes the vices of the Catholic Church.

Aldegrever was interested also in folk subjects. In 1538 and 1551 two series of prints depicting marriage dances were made. An important part of his oeuvre are prints on mythological subjects, the Deeds of Hercules being one of the best examples.

Only two paintings are firmly attributed to him: the wings and predella of the Marienaltar (c. 1525-6) in the Wiesenkirche in Soest, and a portrait of Graf Phillip von Waldeck (1837) in Schloss Aroldsen.
