= Lisiewski =

Lisiewski, feminine: Lisiewska is a Polish surname. Notable people with the surname include:

- Anna Dorothea Lisiewski (Anna Dorota Lisiewska), birth name of Anna Dorothea Therbusch (1721–1782), German artist
- Anna Rosina Lisiewska, birth name of Anna Rosina de Gasc (1713–1783), German artist
- Christoph Friedrich Reinhold Lisiewski (1725–1794), German portrait painter
- Georg Lisiewski (1674–1750), Polish Baroque portrait painter
