= Georg David Matthieu =

German engraver and painter

Georg Matthieu
- Born: 20 November 1737; Berlin, Prussia
- Died: 3 November 1778 (aged 40); Ludwigslust, Mecklenburg-Schwerin
- Parent: David Matthieu

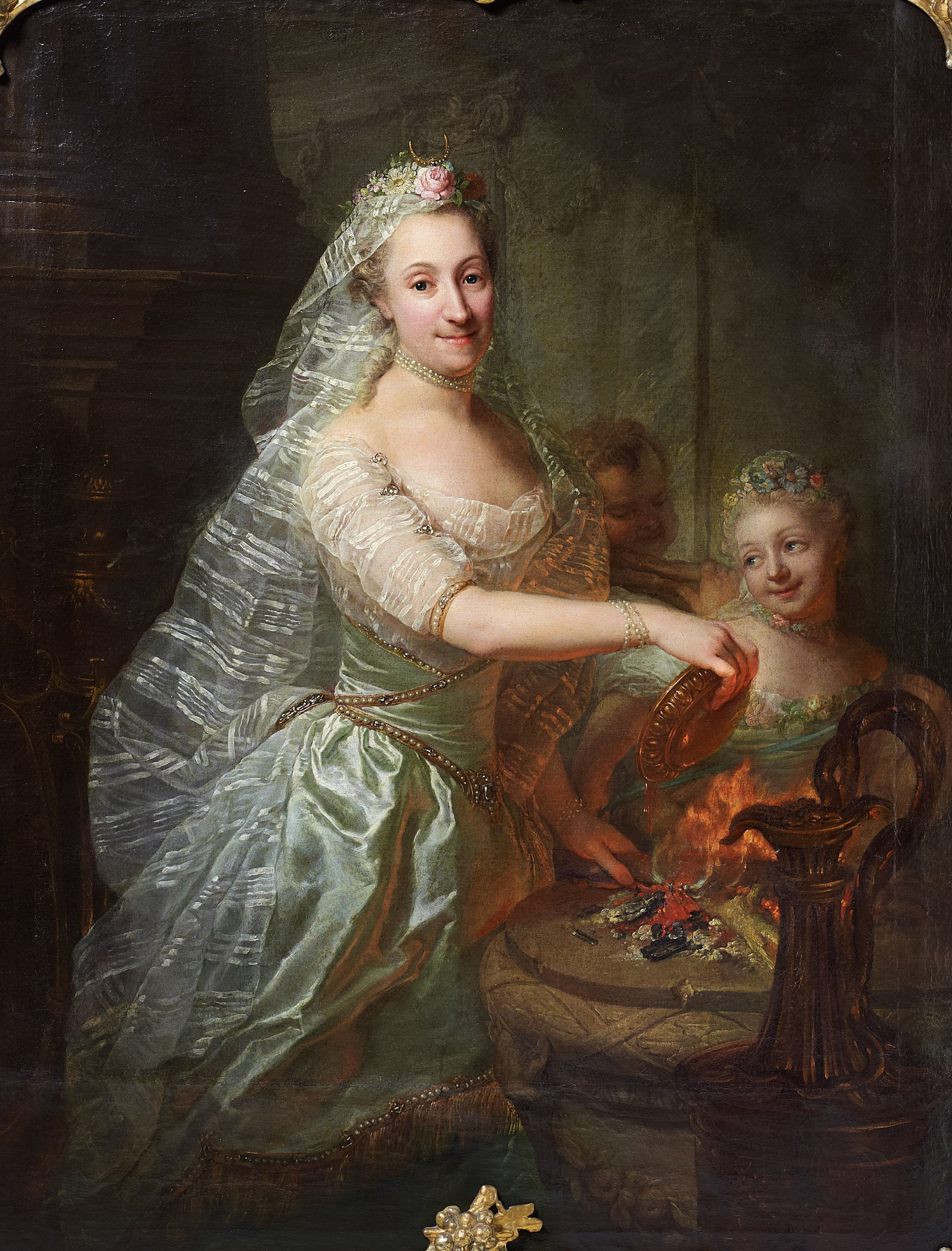
Portrait of Magdalene von Olthof as a Sacrificial Priestess (1762/64)

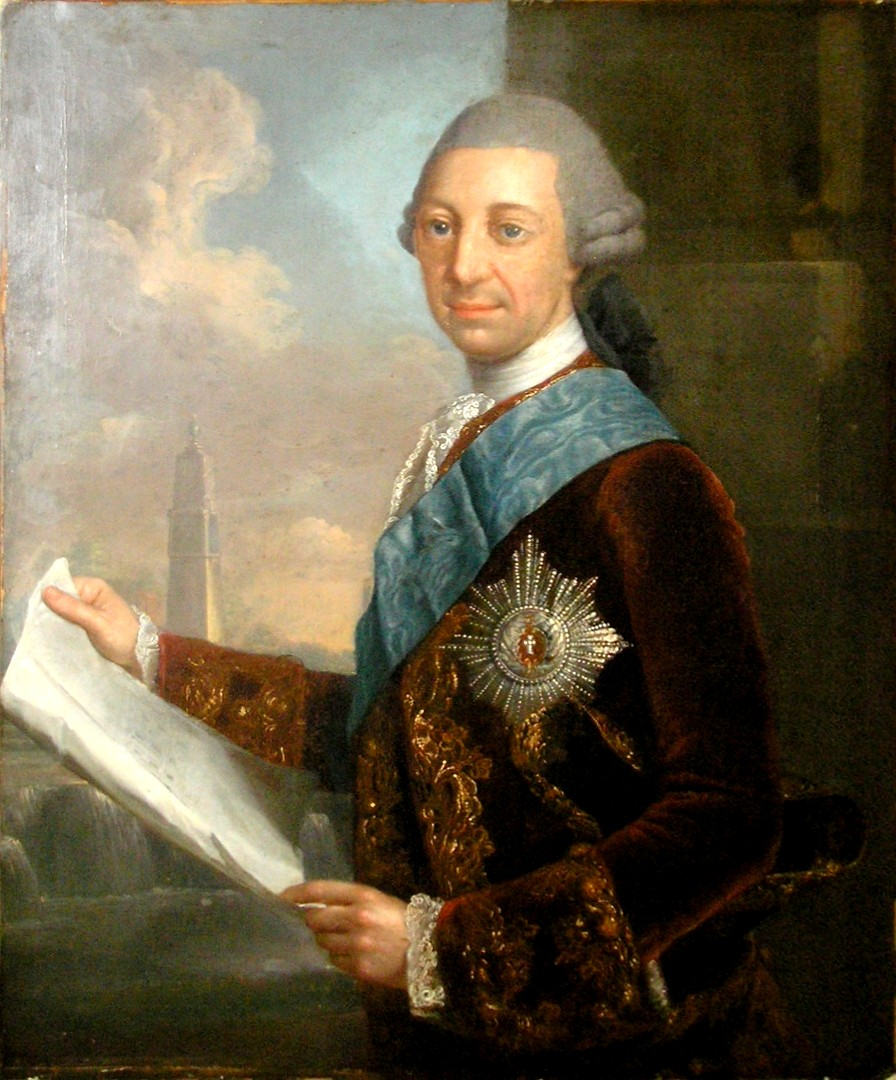
Frederick II, Duke of Mecklenburg. (1772)

Georg David Matthieu (20 November 1737 - 3 November 1778, Ludwigslust) was a German engraver and portrait painter in the Rococo style who worked as court painter for the Duke of Mecklenburg.

== Life ==
He grew up in a family of artists. His father, David Matthieu (1697–1756), was a court painter in Prussia. Through his stepmother Anna Rosina (his father's third wife), he was related to Georg Lisiewski (1674–1750) (her father), who also worked at the Prussian court, and her siblings, Anna Dorothea Therbusch and Christoph Lisiewski. Her children, Leopold (1750–1778) and Rosina (1748–1795) also became painters.

He was a close friend of Jakob Philipp Hackert and probably accompanied him on study trips to Italy. From 1762 to 1764, he was a guest in the home of Adolf Friedrich von Olthof, the Swedish Governor in Stralsund, which was part of Swedish Pomerania at that time. In return, he produced many portraits of the Von Olthofs and other Swedish nobility. It was there that he was commissioned to do a portrait of Queen Sophie Charlotte (who had just married King George III) for display at Gripsholm Castle.

In 1764, as a result of that portrait, he became the court painter for the Grand Duchy of Mecklenburg-Schwerin and was given an apartment in Ludwigslust Palace. For the remainder of his life, he was on call and kept busy, painting portraits of the ducal family and their relatives. He also gave lessons to Christian Ludwig Seehas, who would later become the court painter at Ludwigslust, but the relationship was apparently not a harmonious one, as Seehas left to study in Dresden instead. Matthieu's step-uncle, Christoph Lisiewski, succeeded him as court painter.

Matthieu's paintings may now be seen in all of the ducal residences, although some have also been acquired by the Staatliches Museum Schwerin and the Gemäldegalerie, Berlin.
