= Adolf Friedrich von Olthof =

Politician (1718–1793)

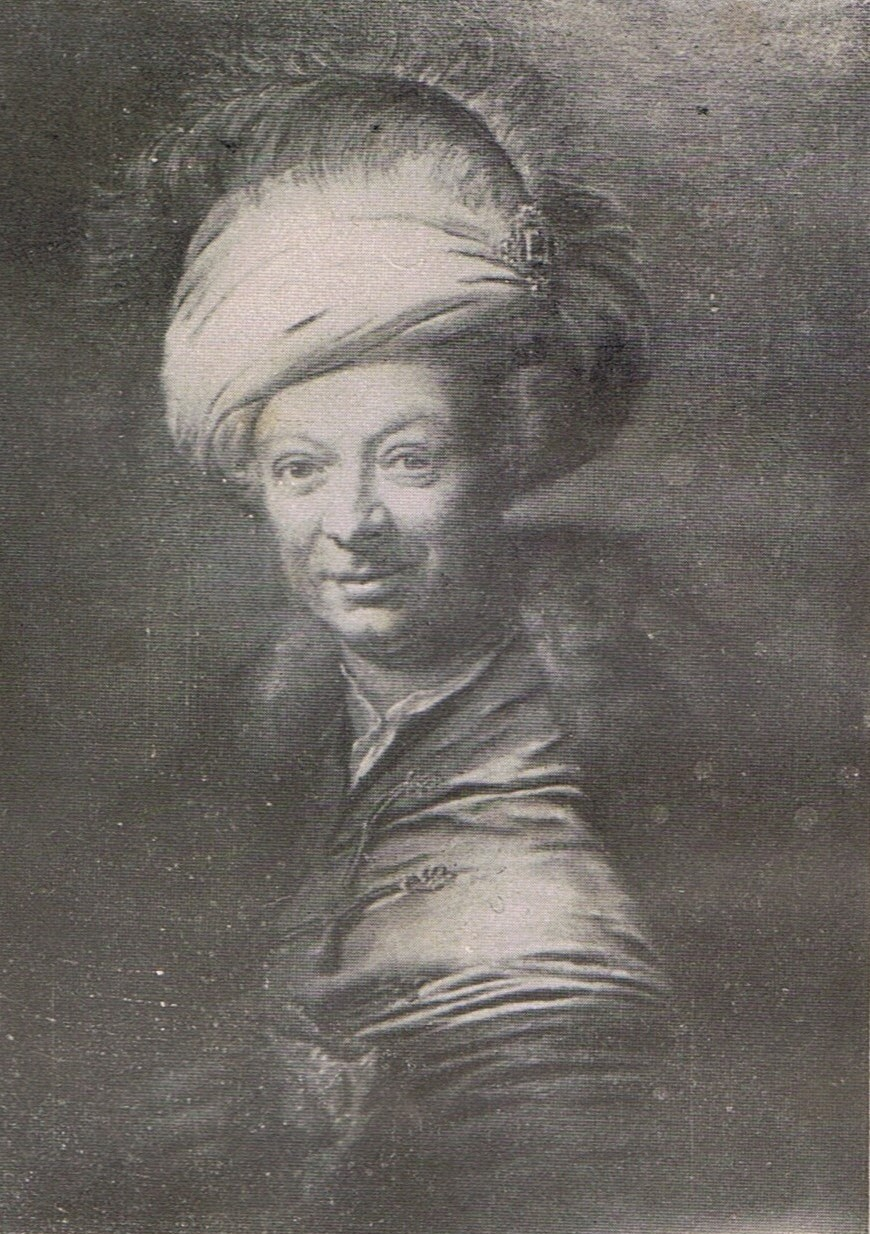
Von Olthof in Turkish costume; portrait by Georg David Matthieu

Adolf Friedrich von Olthof (7 September 1718, Strelitz-Alt - 30 June 1793, Stralsund) was a Swedish Pomeranian councilor, and patron of the arts.

== Biography ==
Von Olthof was the son of the Court Archivist, Lucas Anton Olthoff (d. 1752), who was raised to the nobility the year of his death. From 1728 to 1734, he attended the Gymnasium Stralsund. Later, he studied at the University of Halle and the University of Greifswald. In 1738, he became his father's assistant and, in 1742, a "Secretary of the Knighthood" for Pomerania. Two years later, he succeeded his father in his position of Syndic. From 1747 to 1756, he worked in Stockholm, on behalf of the Knighthood, and gained a knowledge of Swedish law.

In 1757, together with the merchant and banker, Joachim Ulrich Giese, he leased the newly established Stralsund Mint, resigning his various offices. Later that same year, Sweden entered the Seven Years' War, and he was named to the War Commission. In October 1759, he was taken prisoner in Demmin, Prussia, and was held for a year. Upon his release, he acquired several estates along the North Sea. He also profited from efforts to ward off the effects of the devaluation of Prussian currency.

He was commissioned by King Adolf Friedrich to help negotiate peace with Prussia. In 1762, he concluded the Treaty of Hamburg with the Prussian Ambassador, Johann Julius von Hecht. He was also appointed a Councilor but, the following year, once again resigned all his positions to devote himself to his business activities.

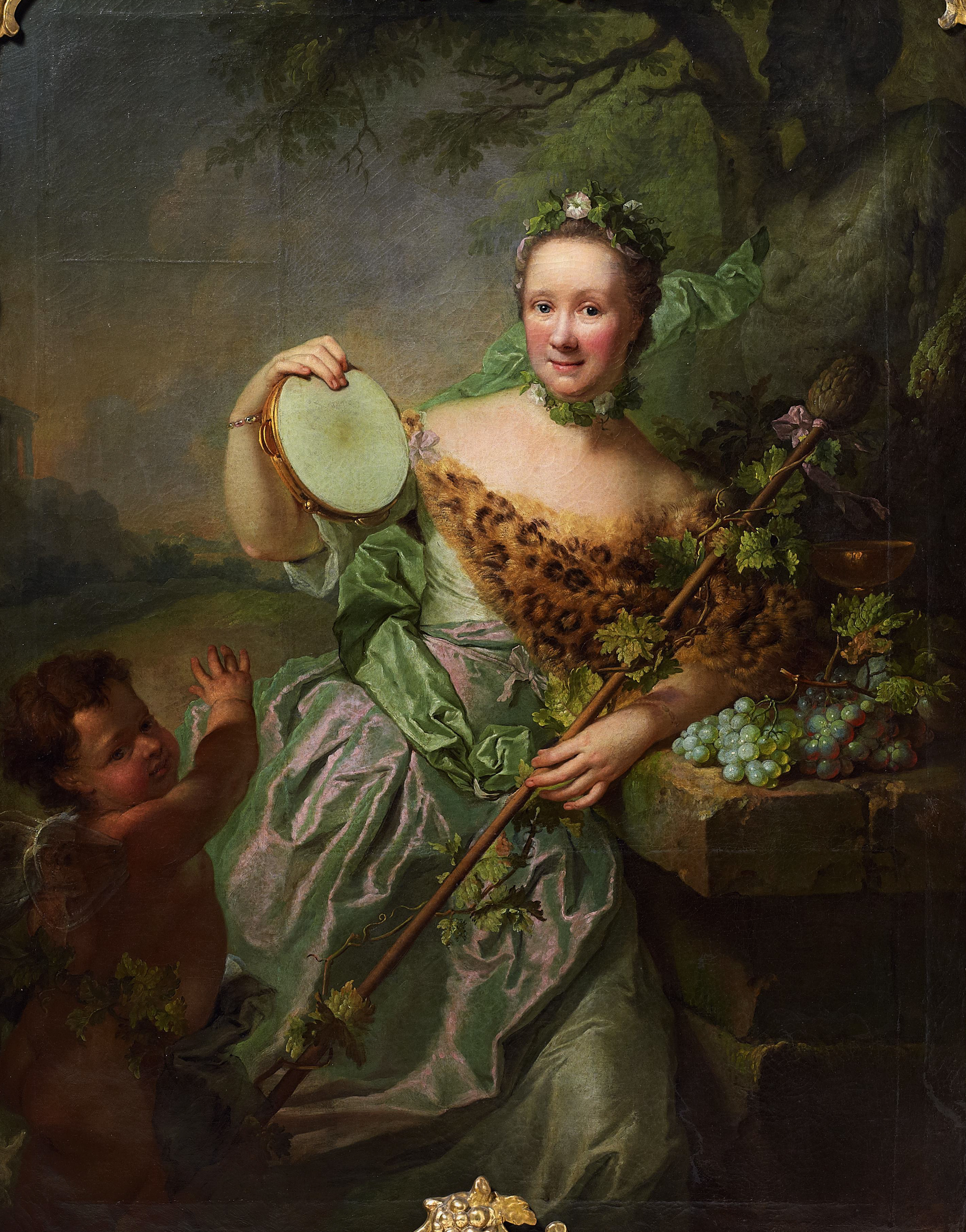
Von Olthof's sister Anna Regina, as a Bacchante; portrait by Matthieu

Some of his wealth went into patronage. His estate near Parchtitz became a gathering place for friends and relatives who were interested in supporting the arts. Shortly after signing the Treaty, he invited the painters Georg David Matthieu and Jakob Philipp Hackert, along with the writer Johann Caspar Lavater, to visit as his guests. The artists provided decorations for his townhouse, and six large-scale landscapes were provided for the ballroom. Later, Hackert would accompany him and Giese on a trip to Sweden. Balthasar Anton Dunker, Olthof's nephew, became Hackert's student, and went to Paris with him to complete his training.

Their contract with the mint expired in 1763. Three years later, after checking their claims, the Swedish government paid them less than half the expenses he and Giese were claiming. This was not enough to cover their debts, due to their lavish lifestyles. When Olthof was reappointed as a Councilor in 1773, half his annual salary was seized by creditors; a settlement was reached in 1775. The terms gave him and Giese licenses to run a lottery and a pawn shop, secured with bonds. Despite this, the Royal Court in Greifswald opened bankruptcy proceedings against him in 1777. Only half of his debt was covered, and he resigned from the government.

In 1787, von Olthof was named Vice-Chancellor at his alma mater, the University of Greifswald, where he received a professorship. He sold the pawn shop concession in 1792, to help Giese's widow and provide himself with a small pension. He died impoverished and childless, having never married, and was interred at St. Jürgen's Cemetery in Stralsund.
