= Harvest Time at Carditello =

1791 painting by Jacob Philipp Hackert

- Mietitura a Carditello (Italian)
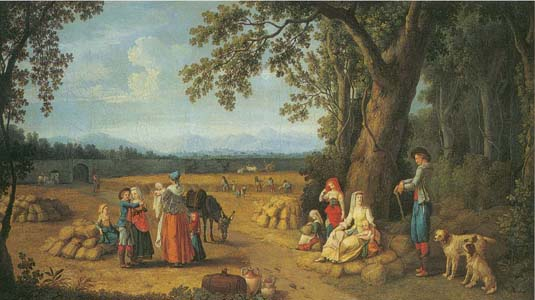
- Artist: Jakob Philipp Hackert
- Year: 1791
- Medium: Oil on canvas
- Dimensions: 141 cm × 219 cm (56 in × 86 in)
- Location: Museo di Capodimonte, Naples

Harvest Time at Carditello is a 1791 oil on canvas painting by Jakob Philipp Hackert, who had become a painter to the royal court at Naples. In 1791 he was commissioned to paint frescoes in the 'salottino' of the manorhouse at Carditello, but the cycle was partly destroyed by anti-Bourbon figures following the unification of Italy.

The painting depicts Ferdinand I of the Two Sicilies and his wife Maria Carolina of Austria standing or sitting under a tree in outdoor country clothes as the peasants busy themselves with the harvest..

The work is now in the National Museum of Capodimonte in Naples, Italy.

== Sources ==
- Museo di Capodimonte
- Touring Club Italiano, Museo di Capodimonte, Milano, Touring Club Editore, 2012. ISBN 978-88-365-2577-5
