= Christoph Friedrich Reinhold Lisiewski =

German portrait painter (1725–1794)

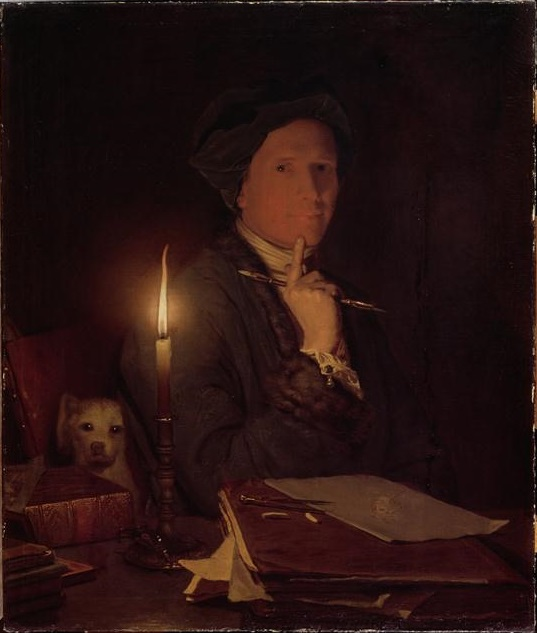
Self-portrait, c. 1760

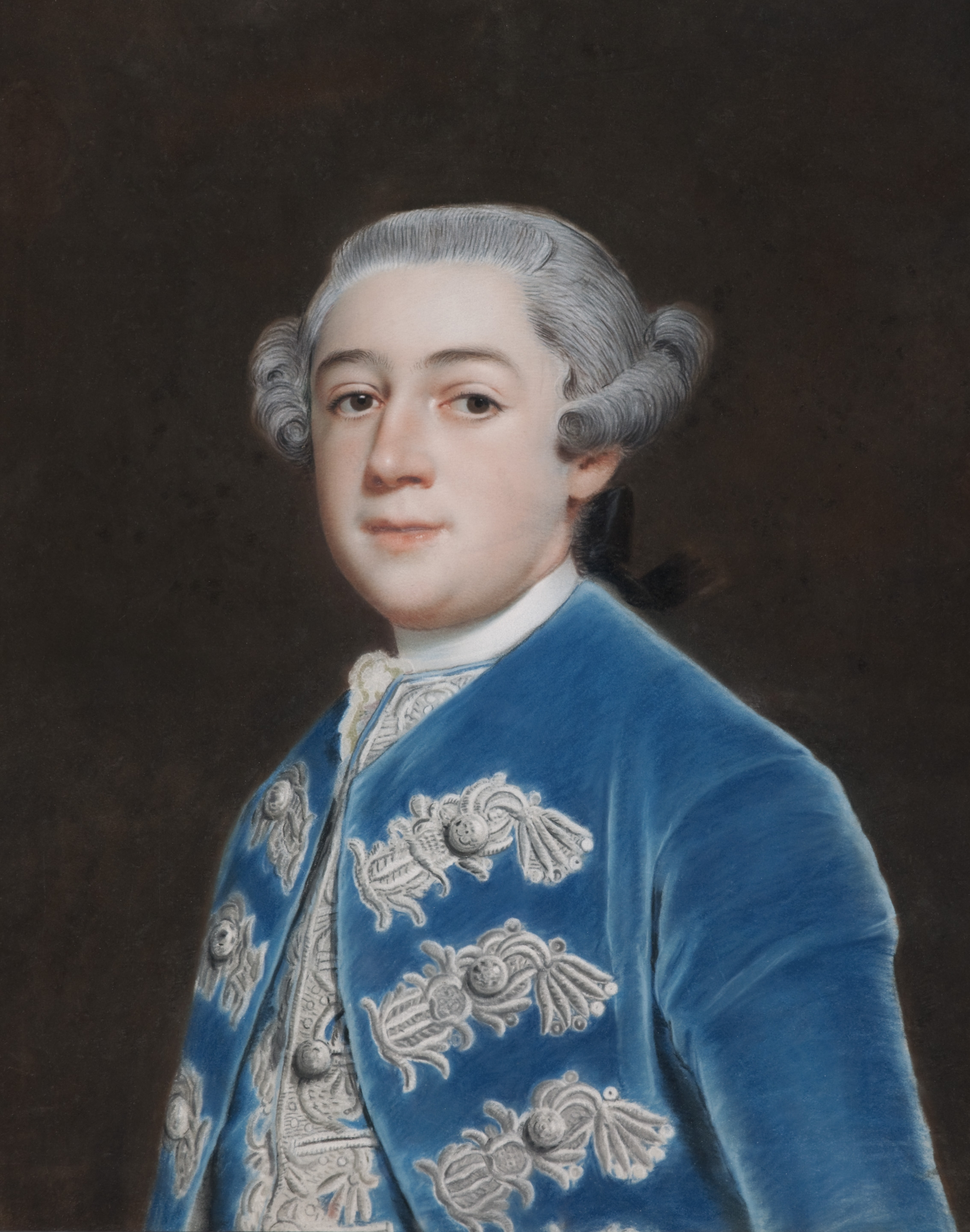
Leopold III of Anhalt-Dessau, portrayed by Lisiewsky

Christoph Friedrich Reinhold Lisiewski (or Lisiewsky) (3 June 1725 in Berlin – 11 June 1794 in Ludwigslust) was an 18th-century German portrait painter.

== Biography ==
Lisiewski belonged to a family of painters founded by his father, Georg Lisiewski, a native of Poland who was an active portrait painter in Berlin. Christoph Lisiewski was from 1752 to 1772 court painter to the Prince of Anhalt-Dessau. In that time, he also traveled to Dresden and Leipzig to work. He then brought together with his sister Anna Dorothea Therbusch a workshop in Berlin in which a shared work was performed, activities lasted from 1773 to 1779. His other sister was the portrait painter Anna Rosina de Gasc. In 1783 he became an honorary member of the Prussian Academy of Arts in Berlin.

As the successor to his nephew Georg David Matthieu, he was a portrait painter for the Mecklenburg-Schwerin court at Ludwigslust palace. He worked there for 18 years until his death.

== Family ==
Christoph Friedrich Reinhold Lisiewski was married. His daughter is the artist Friederike Julie Lisiewska (1772–1856). At Christoph Lisiewski was more one daughter Julie Lisiewska (1767–1837), who was married Wilhelm Barthold Rudolf Wildfang (1750–1820).
