= Anna Rosina de Gasc =

German artist (1713–1783)

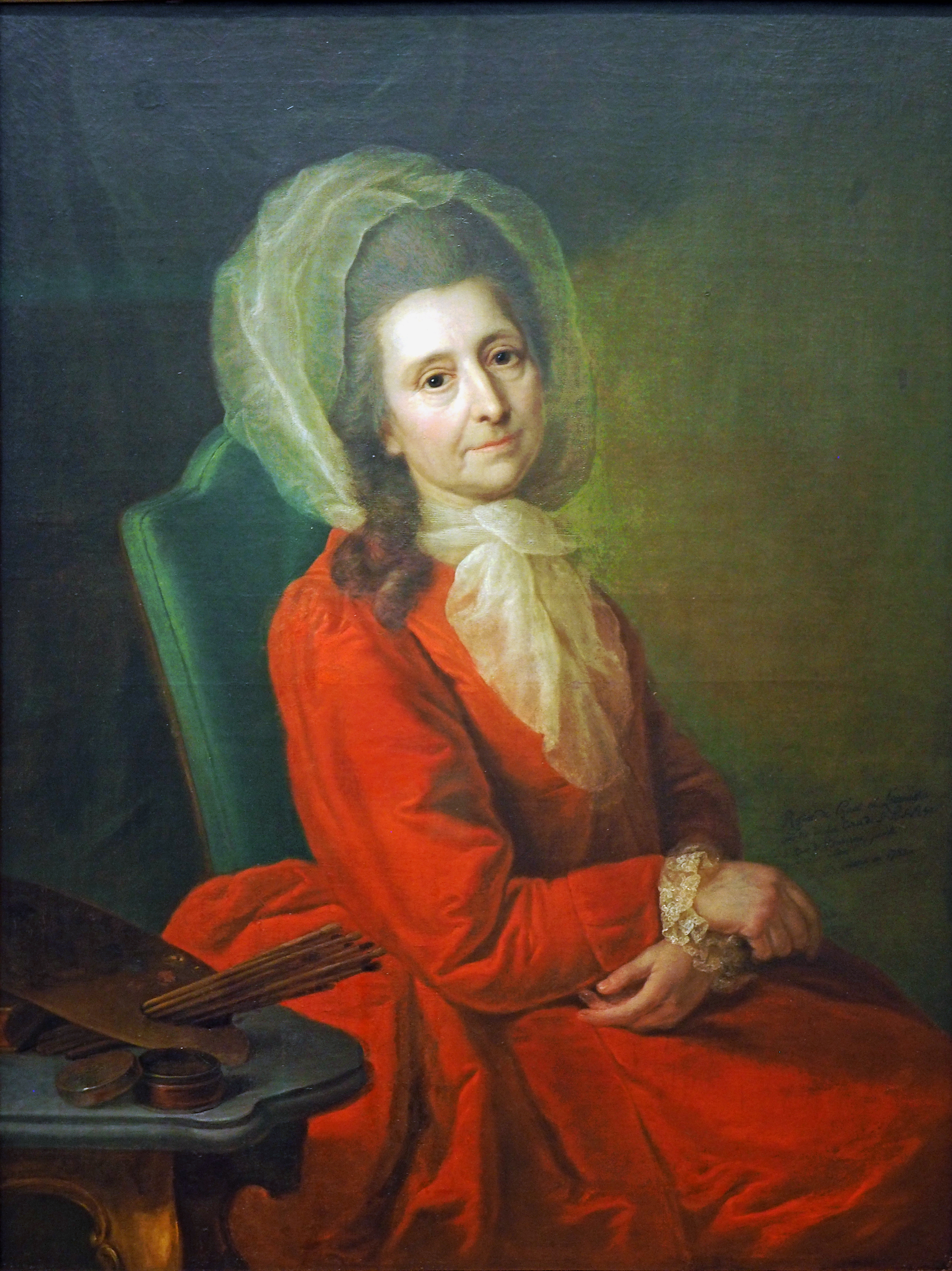
- Self-portrait, 1782
- Born: Anna Rosina Lisiewska; 10 July 1713; Berlin
- Died: 26 March 1783 (aged 69); Dresden
- Education: Georg Lisiewski (her father); Antoine Pesne
- Known for: Painting

Anna Rosina de Gasc (born Anna Rosina Lisiewska; 10 July 1713 – 26 March 1783) was a German portrait painter.

== Early life ==
Anna Rosina was born into a family of painters of Polish noble origin in Berlin. Her mother was Maria Elizabeth Kahl from Pomerania. Her father, Georg Lisiewski (1674–1751), taught painting to Rosina and her siblings Anna Dorothea (1721–1782) and Christoph Friedrich (1725–1794). She later studied with the painter Antoine Pesne and learned his style of painting.

== Career ==
She mostly painted portraits.

In 1757, she was appointed as court painter by Frederick Augustus of Anhalt-Zerbst. During her ten-year stay at the court, she painted a gallery of forty ladies. Later, she moved to the ducal court in Brunswick, where she received a generous grant from Duchess Philippine Charlotte of Brunswick-Wolfenbüttel.

Her work is held in the permanent collections of several museums worldwide, including the Kunsthistorisches Museum, the University of Michigan Museum of Art, and the National Museum, Warsaw.

== Personal life ==
In 1741, Anna Rosina married the Prussian court painter David Matthieu (1697–1756) and became the stepmother of Georg David Matthieu. After David's death, she married in 1760 to Louis de Gasc, who was a friend of Gotthold Ephraim Lessing. She had two children with him.

Anna Rosina de Gasc died in 1783 in Dresden.

== Honors ==
- 1757: Court painter in Anhalt-Zerbst
- 1769: Honorary Member of the Dresden Academy of Fine Arts
- 1777: court painter of the Duchy of Brunswick-Wolfenbüttel

== Gallery ==
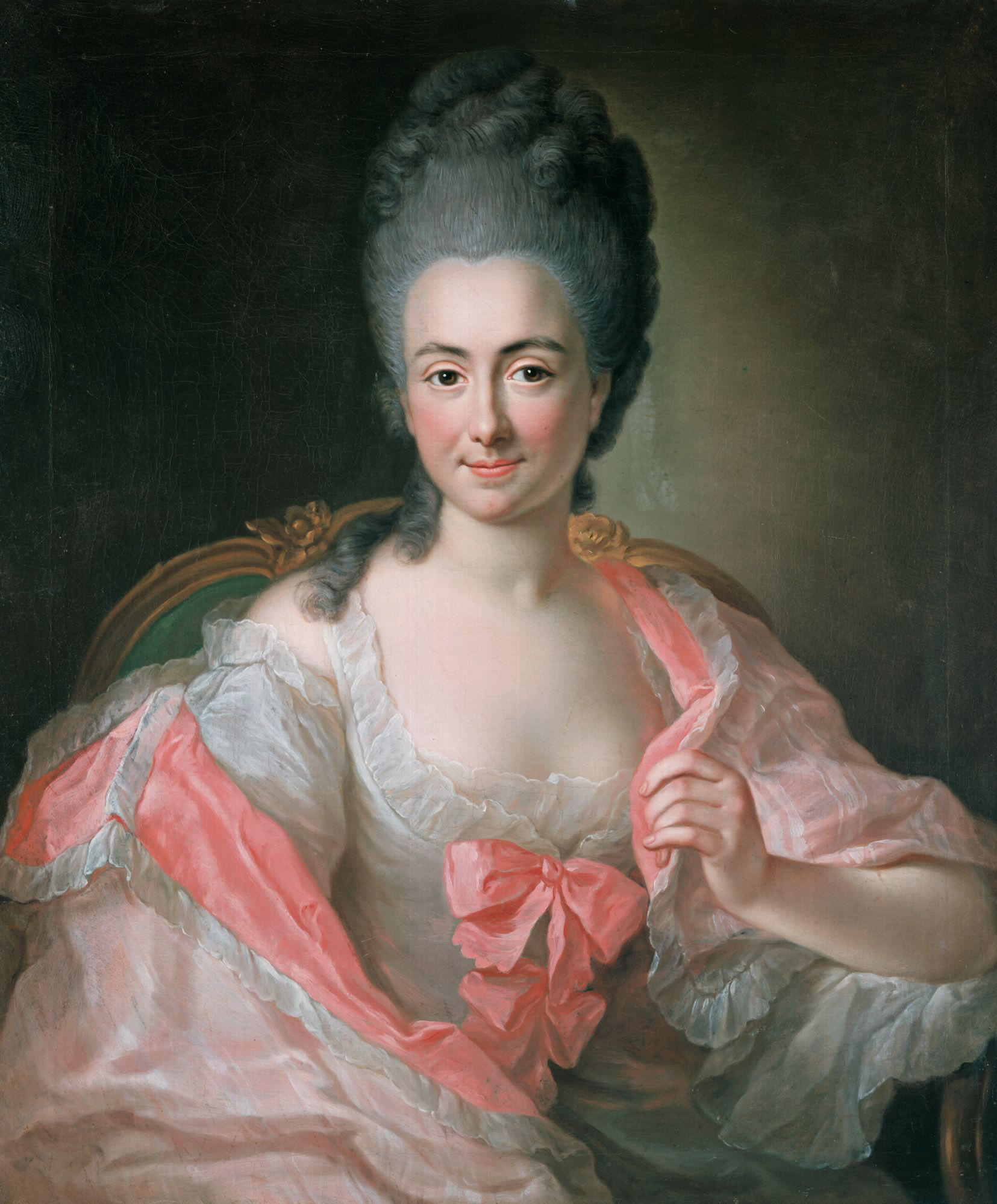
Portrait of Maria Antonia Branconi

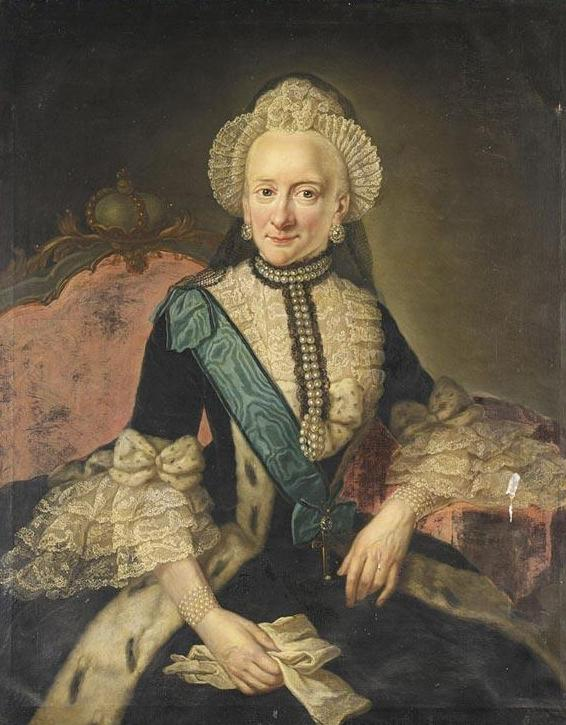
Portrait of the Princess-Abbess Therese of Gandersheim

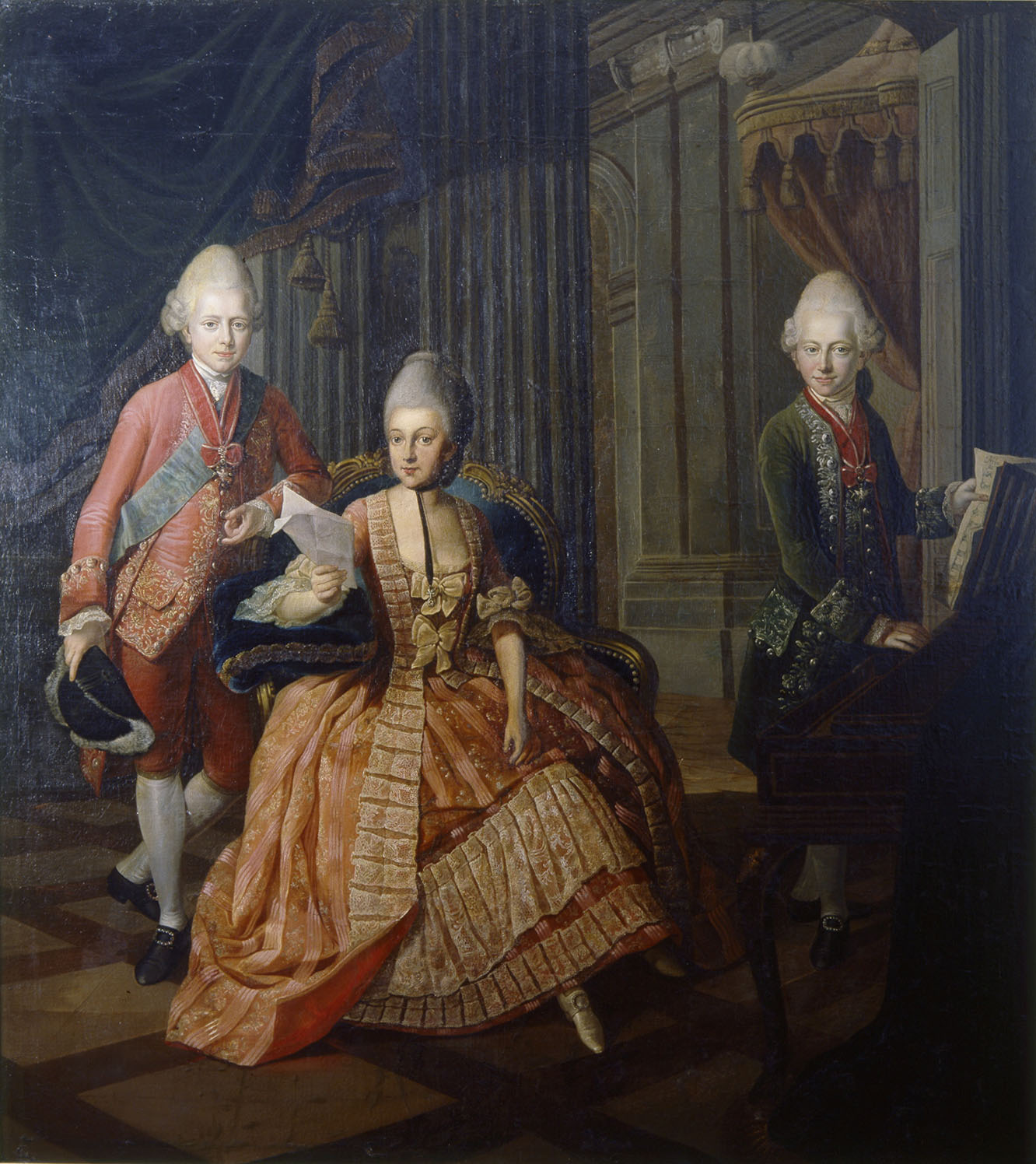
Duchess Anna Amalia, Hereditary Prince Karl August and Prince Frederick Ferdinand Constantin of Saxe-Weimar-Eisenach

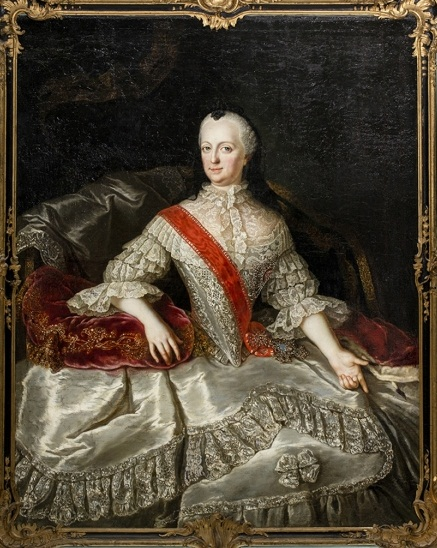
Johanna Elisabeth of Schleswig-Holstein-Gottorf, later Princess of Anhalt-Zerbst

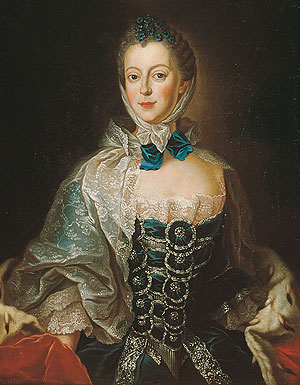
Elisabeth Friederike Sophie of Brandenburg-Bayreuth

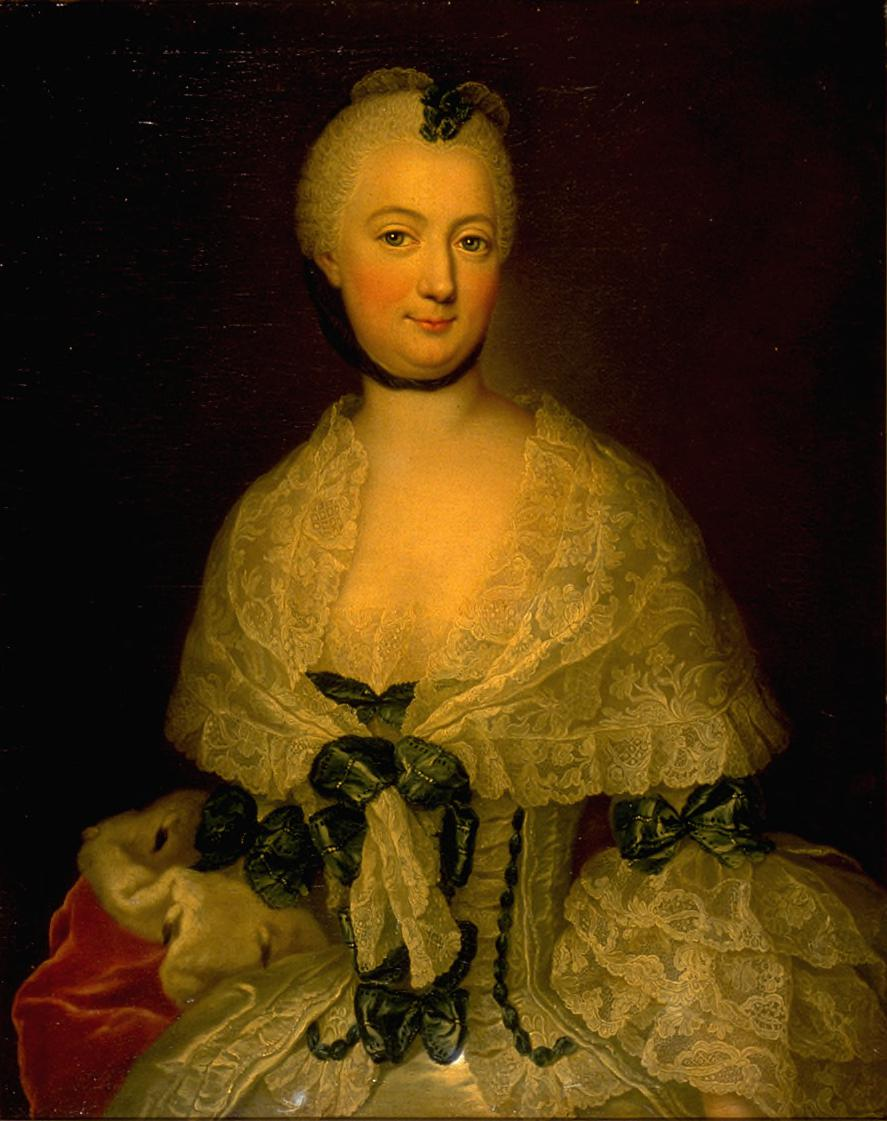
Portrait of a Lady, Anna Rosina Mathieu, 1754, University of Michigan Museum of Art

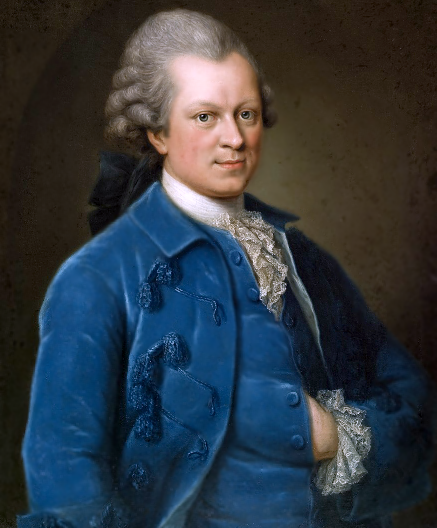
Portrait of Gotthold Ephraim Lessing

== Sources ==
- Anna Rosina de Gasc, in: Ulrich Thieme, Felix Becker et al.: Allgemeines Lexikon der Bildenden Künstler von der Antike bis zur Gegenwart, vol. 23, E. A. Seemann, Leipzig, 1929, p. 283
- Frances Borzello: Wie Frauen sich sehen. Selbstbildnisse aus fünf Jahrhunderten, Karl Blessing Verlag, Munich, 1998
- Gottfried Sello: Malerinnen aus fünf Jahrhunderten, Ellert & Richter, Hamburg, 1988, ISBN 3-89234-077-3
