= Georg Lisiewski =

Polish Baroque portrait painter (1674–1750)

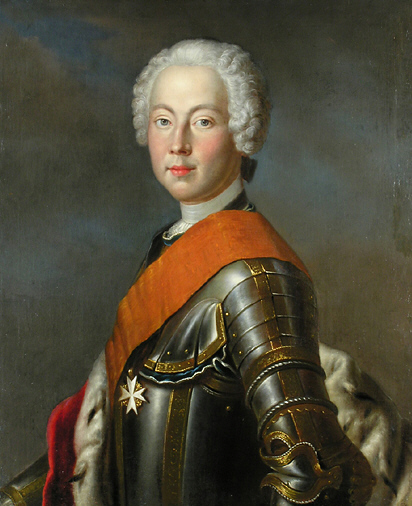
Portrait of Frederick, Margrave of Brandenburg-Bayreuth

Georg Lisiewski or Jerzy Lisiewski (1674 – 6 January 1750), was a Baroque portrait painter at the court of King Frederick William I of Prussia. Lisiewski, of Polish descent, became head of a notable family of painters spanning three generations.

== Biography ==
According to an older tradition, he was born in Olesko, a town then belonging to the Polish Ruthenian Voivodeship (now in Ukraine) and was probably taught by painters active at Olesko Castle, that was also the birthplace of King John III Sobieski (1629–1696). However, other sources claim he was born in Olecko (Marggrabowa) in the Duchy of Prussia, into a Lutheran Polish family. A mezzotint decorated by the signature of Georg Lisewsskij, illustrating a travelogue by Otto Friedrich von der Groeben was issued in Prussian Marienwerder (Kwidzyn) in 1694. He may have received an apprenticeship by the Swedish court painter David von Krafft in Swedish Pomerania, with regard to similarity in style.

About 1700 Lisiewski moved to Berlin, where on 24 November 1707 he married Maria Elizabeth Kahl (1688–1733) from Pomerania. Both were members of the pietistic community founded by Philipp Spener at the St. Nicholas' Church. He became the father of the German painters Anna Dorothea Therbusch (1721–1782), Anna Rosina de Gasc (1713–1783), and Christoph Friedrich Reinhold Lisiewski (1725–1794). He was also the teacher of the court painters Thomas Huber (1700–1779) and David Matthieu (1697–1756), the father of Georg David Matthieu (1737–1778).

At Georg Lisiewski was more six children:

- Johann Paul Lisiewski (b. 1709)
- Dorothea Elisabeth Lisiewska (1711–1740), second wife of court painter in Prussia David Matthieu and mother of engraver and painter Georg David Matthieu.
- Maria Christina Lisiewska (b. 1715)
- Maria Magdalena Lisiewska (1717–1771)
- Maria Elisabeth Lisiewska (b. 1719)
- Christina Sophie Lisiewska (1723–1794)

Among his grandchildren were Dorothea Wilhelmine Therbusch (b. 1743), who was married painter Johann Christian Samuel Gohl (1743–1825), genre and still life painter Rosina Christiana Ludovica Matthieu (1748–1795), portrait and history painter Leopold Matthieu (1750–1778), Julie Lisiewska (1767–1837), who was married Wilhelm Barthold Rudolf Wildfang (1750–1820), and artist Friederike Julie Lisiewska (1772–1856).

Under the rule of the sober 'Soldier King' Frederick William I from 1713, the artistic life at the Berlin court came to a standstill, nevertheless, Lisiewski's austere portraits remained highly appreciated. Supported by the cultured queen consort Sophia Dorothea, he rivalled with Antoine Pesne as the leading court painter. On behalf of the king and the Prussian Army, he painted portraits of generals such as Prince Leopold of Anhalt-Dessau, colonels, and members of the Potsdam Giants for the rooms of the Potsdam City Palace. In 1715 Prince Christian August of Anhalt-Zerbst summoned him to Stettin to portray the subalterns of his infantry regiment. Lisiewski also pictured numerous Prussian state officials, nobles, and Berlin merchants.

He established even closer relations with the Anhalt House of Ascania, when in 1730 he accompanied his daughter Anna Rosina to the Stettin court of Prince Christian August, where she portrayed Princess consort Joanna Elisabeth. When Frederick II succeeded to the Prussian throne, Lisiewski's career in Berlin came to an end, nevertheless he obtained more orders from the Anhalt-Dessau court, even after the death of Prince Leopold in 1747.

Lisiewski died in Berlin. His paintings were appreciated by contemporary artists like Joachim Martin Falbe (1709–1782).
