= Anna Dorothea Therbusch =

German artist (1721–1782)

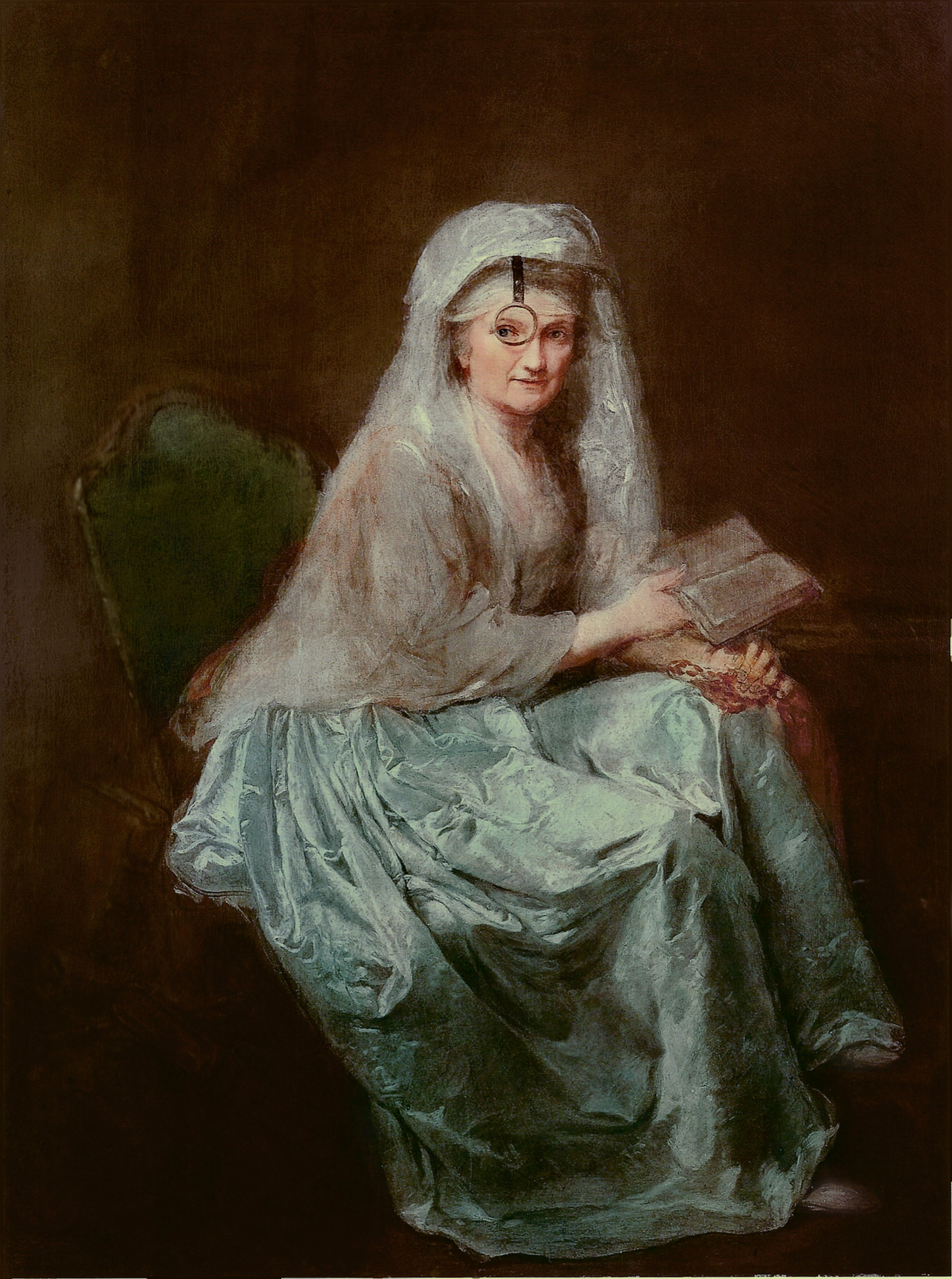
- 1771 self-portrait of Therbusch
- Born: 23 July 1721; Berlin, Kingdom of Prussia
- Died: 9 November 1782 (aged 61); Berlin, Kingdom of Prussia
- Other name: Lisiewski (maiden name) Madame Therbouche
- Occupation: Painter

Anna Dorothea Therbusch (born Anna Dorothea Lisiewski, Polish: Anna Dorota Lisiewska, 23 July 1721 – 9 November 1782) was a prominent Rococo painter born in the Kingdom of Prussia. About 200 of her works survive, and she painted at least eighty-five verified portraits.

== Life ==
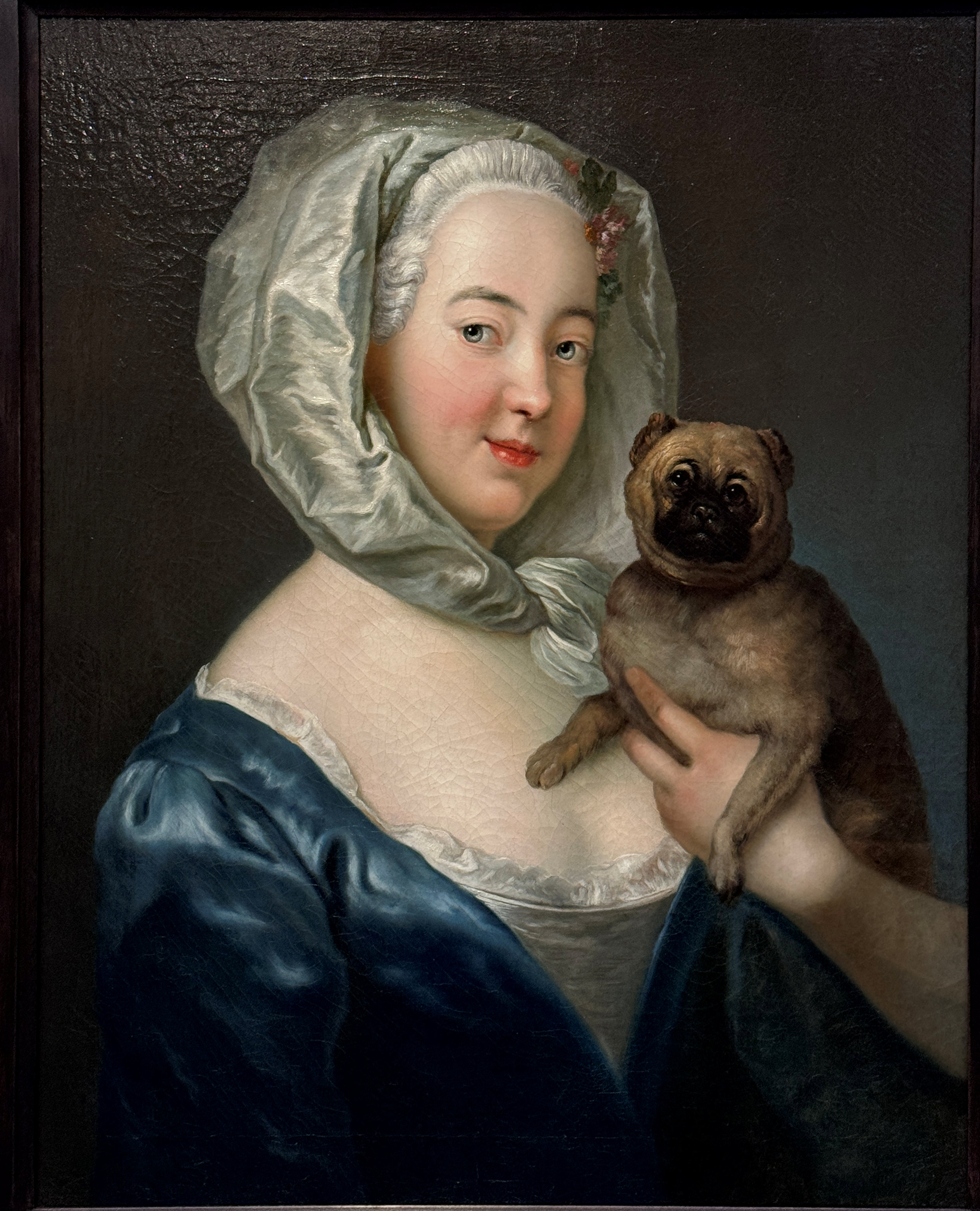
Portrait of Marie de Rège with pug dog (after Antoine Pesne), ca.1740, Anhaltische Gemäldegalerie Dessau

Anna Dorothea Therbusch was born in Berlin. She came from a noted family, the daughter of Maria Elisabetha (née Kahlow) and Georg Lisiewski (1674–1751), a Berlin portrait painter of Polish stock who arrived in Prussia in 1692 as part of the retinue of the court architect Johann Friedrich Eosander von Göthe. Georg taught Anna, her sister Anna Rosina Lisiewski and their brother Christian Friedrich Reinhold to paint. She trained as a painter during her teens. Anna Dorothea and her elder sister Anna Rosina were hailed as Wunderkinder of painting. In her youth, she painted copies of Antoine Pesne's fetes galantes and, like Pesne, learned to emulate the styles of Watteau, Lancret, and Pater – artists who Frederic II especially admired.

Therbusch painted in all genres. She also did history paintings, and experimented with Dutch-style genre scenes similar to those of Gerard Dou.

By the end of her life, she had received honours from Berlin, Stuttgart, and Mannheim. She made lucrative commissions from her works and eventually received royal patronage, after many letters of introduction from her patrons in Paris, Italy, Germany, and Prussia.

== Marriage ==
Anna Dorothea married Berlin innkeeper Ernst Friedrich Therbusch (1711–1773) in 1742 and gave up painting until around 1760 to help her husband in the restaurant. Not until her spousal obligations were discharged, as a "short-sighted, middle-aged woman", did she return to her art career in 1760. She had three children by the age of forty. She left Berlin to paint in Stuttgart for the court of Karl Eugen, Duke of Wurttemberg, seeking increased recognition for her works.

== Notable works ==
The Swing and Game of Shuttlecock (Neues Palais, Potsdam) are a pair of conversation pieces that defined her first period of work. Game of Shuttlecock was signed and dated in 1741. These two paintings were modeled on works of Jean-Antoine Watteau and similar to those of Nicolas Lancret.

== Paris ==
She does not lack the talent to arouse interest in a country like ours, she lacks youth, beauty, modesty, coquetterie. She could have been enthusiastic about the merits of our great artists, taken lessons from them, had more bosom and a handsome posterior and have had to offer both to the artists.

— Denis Diderot.

Therbusch's first recorded return to painting was in 1761 in the Stuttgart court of Duke Karl Eugen. She completed eighteen paintings in the shortest time for the castle gallery. In 1762 she became an honorary member of the Stuttgart Académie des Arts, founded by Duke Karl Eugen in 1761, and worked in Stuttgart and Mannheim. She did receive recognition for her works. Her talent was recognized by the Academia of Bologna. She was also honored by the court of Mannheim. Therbusch had painted the Kurfurst Karl Throdor in and received commissions from the Prince of Hohenzollern-Hechingen. In 1765 she went to Paris. The French Royal Academy of Painting and Sculpture displayed her work first, proudly supporting a female artist. Denis Diderot, the controversial and outspoken art critic and philosopher, was sympathetic to her, even to the point of posing naked for her. Anna Dorothea was elected as a member of the Académie Royale in 1767, lived with Diderot and met famous artists, and even painted Philipp Hackert but she remained unsuccessful in Paris. That time is, however, seen as her most creative.

== Return to Prussia ==
Paris was, and is, an expensive city and Anna Dorothea had financial difficulties. From November 1768 until early 1769, the heavily indebted painter returned to Berlin, via Brussels and the Netherlands, and became the primary painter in Prussia, where she was held in high esteem. She was portrait painter to Frederick II of Prussia (Frederick the Great), whose newly built palace of Sanssouci she decorated with mythological scenes. She also painted portraits of eight Prussian royals for Catherine II of Russia (Catherine the Great). Though Anna Dorothea never went to Russia, Russian collectors also appreciated her work. She also met the group of artists surrounding Johann Wolfgang von Goethe. Therbusch would continue to paint into her late life. She frequently painted self-portraits, twelve total. As her eyesight started to fail her, she would frequently add monocles into her self-portraits. Her late paintings were loosely classical, with garbs and hints of Roman goddesses.

She died in Berlin on 9 November 1782 at the age of 61, and was buried at Dorotheenstadt cemetery, whose pertaining church was destroyed in World War II. Her tomb remains intact.

Her relationship with Diderot inspired Éric-Emmanuel Schmitt to write his play Der Freigeist ("The Free Spirit"), also known as Der Libertin ("The Libertine").

== Gallery ==
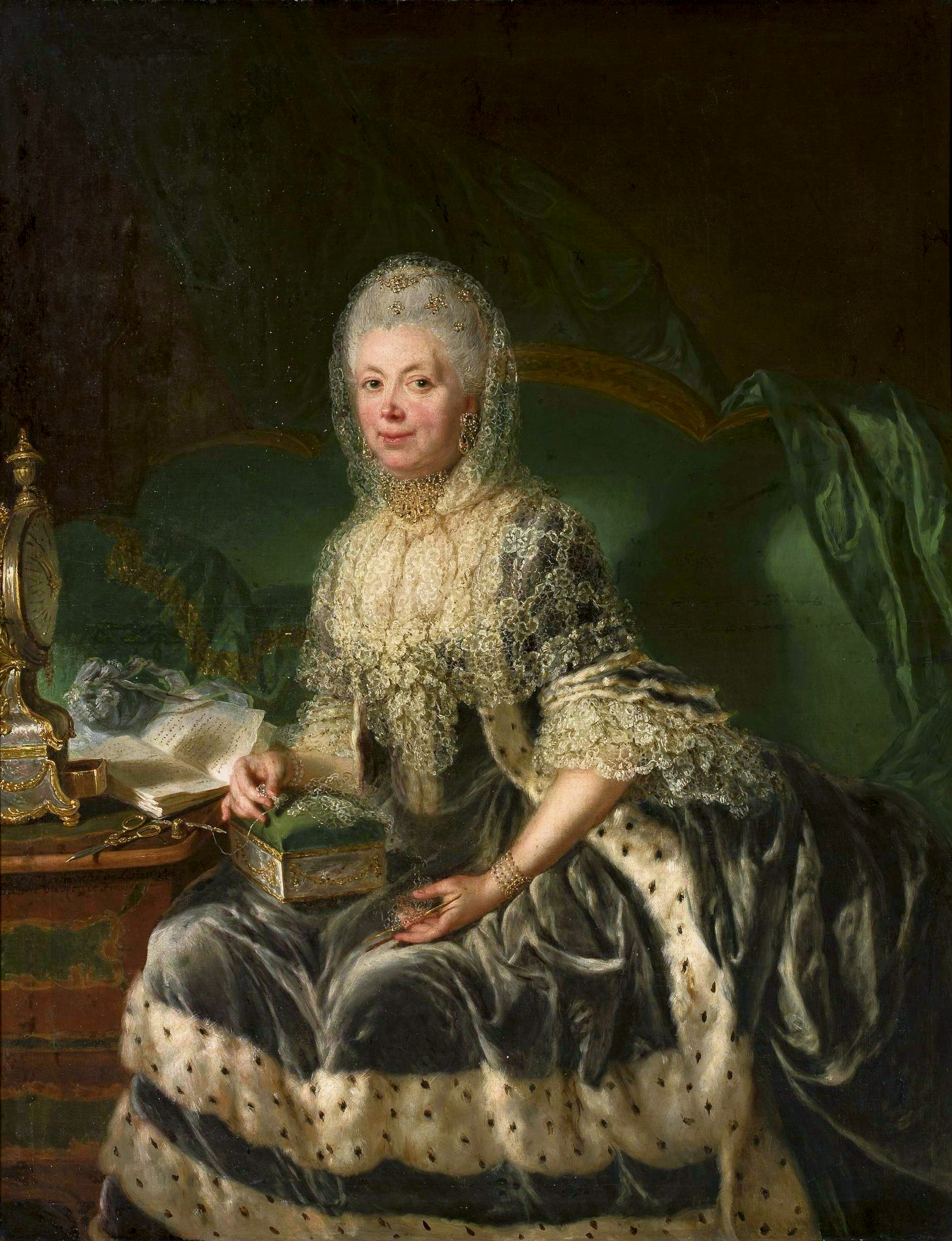
Anna von Wartensleben, 1760s

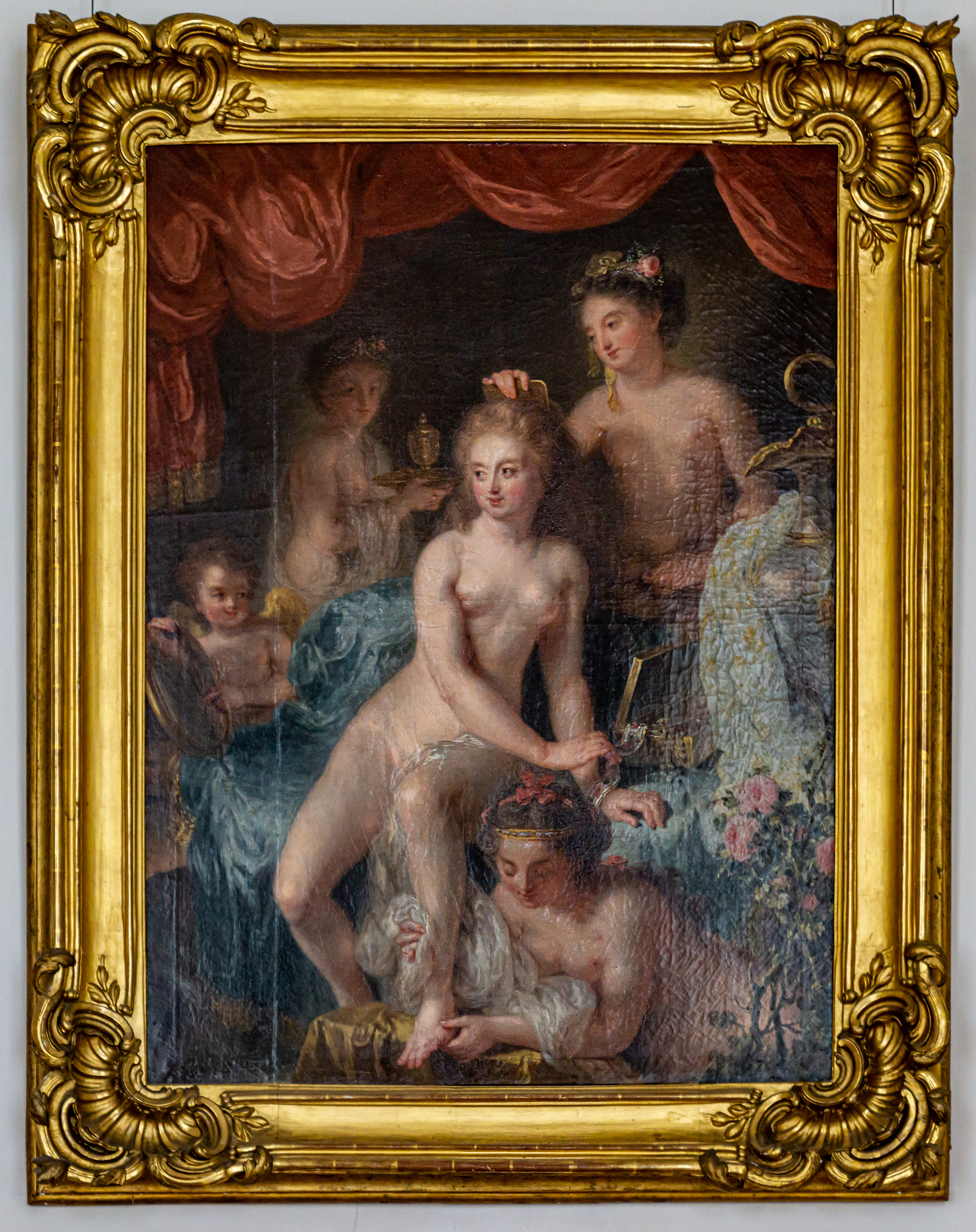
Toilet of Venus, 1772

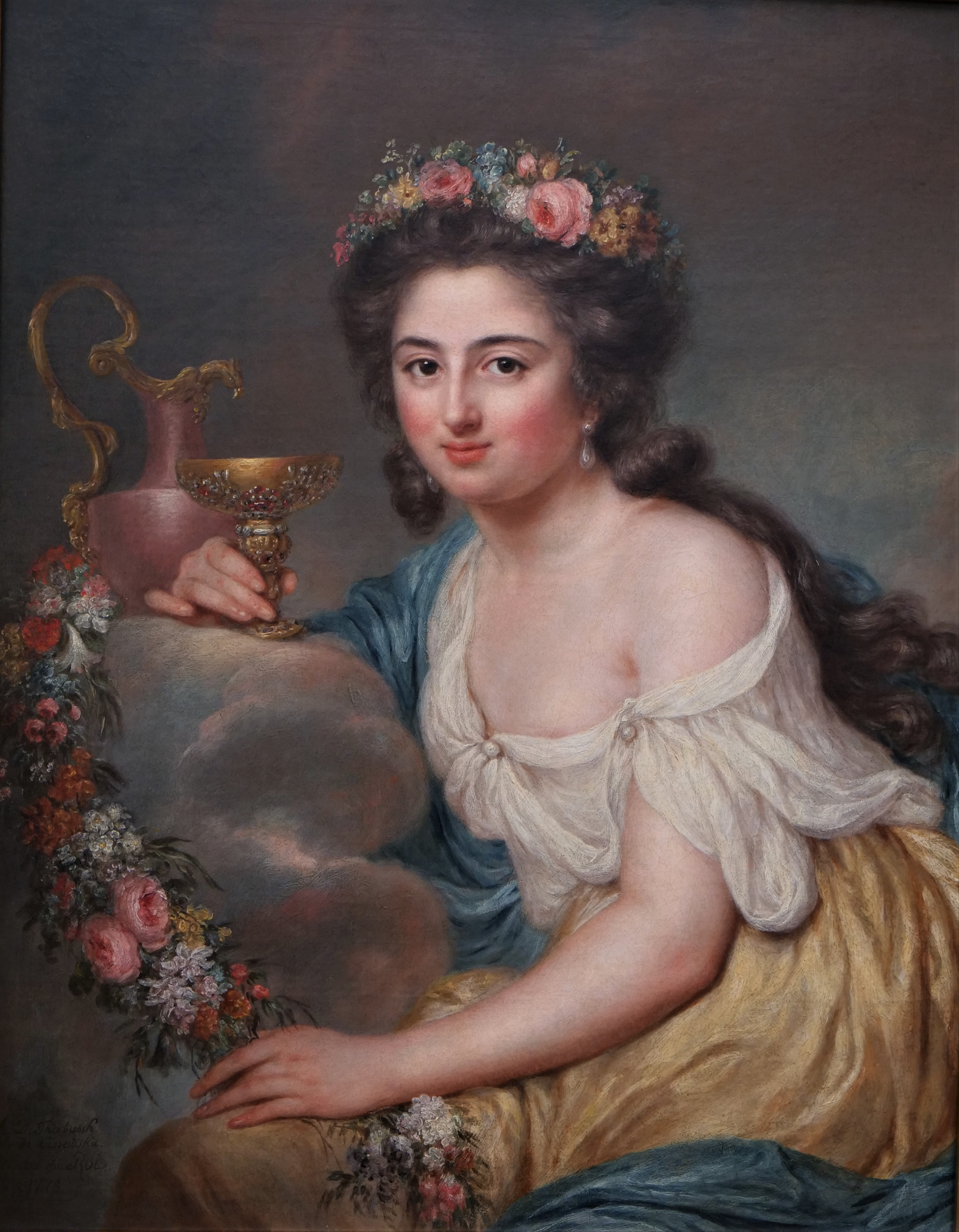
Henriette Herz, 1778

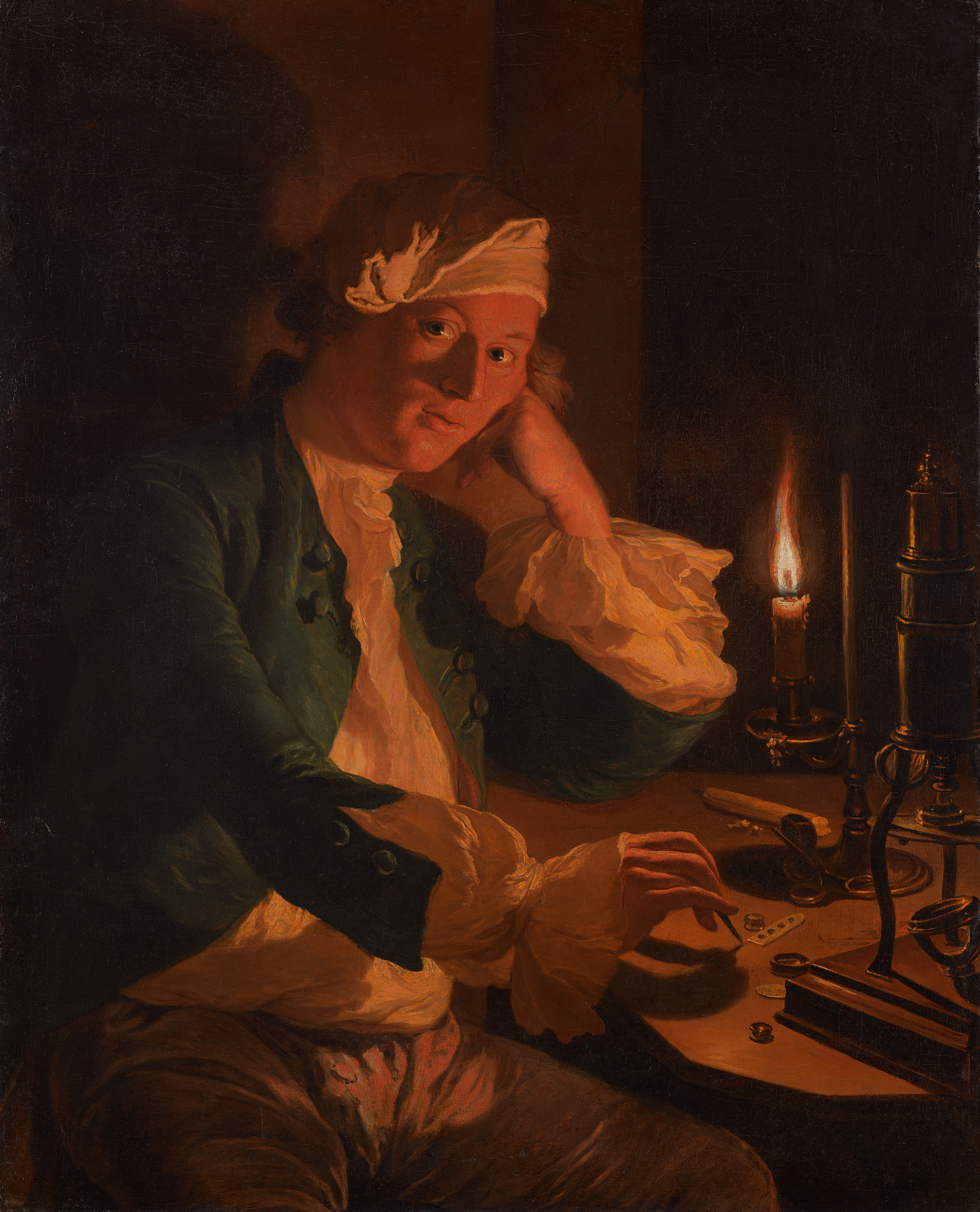
A Scientist Seated at a Desk by Candlelight, 1767

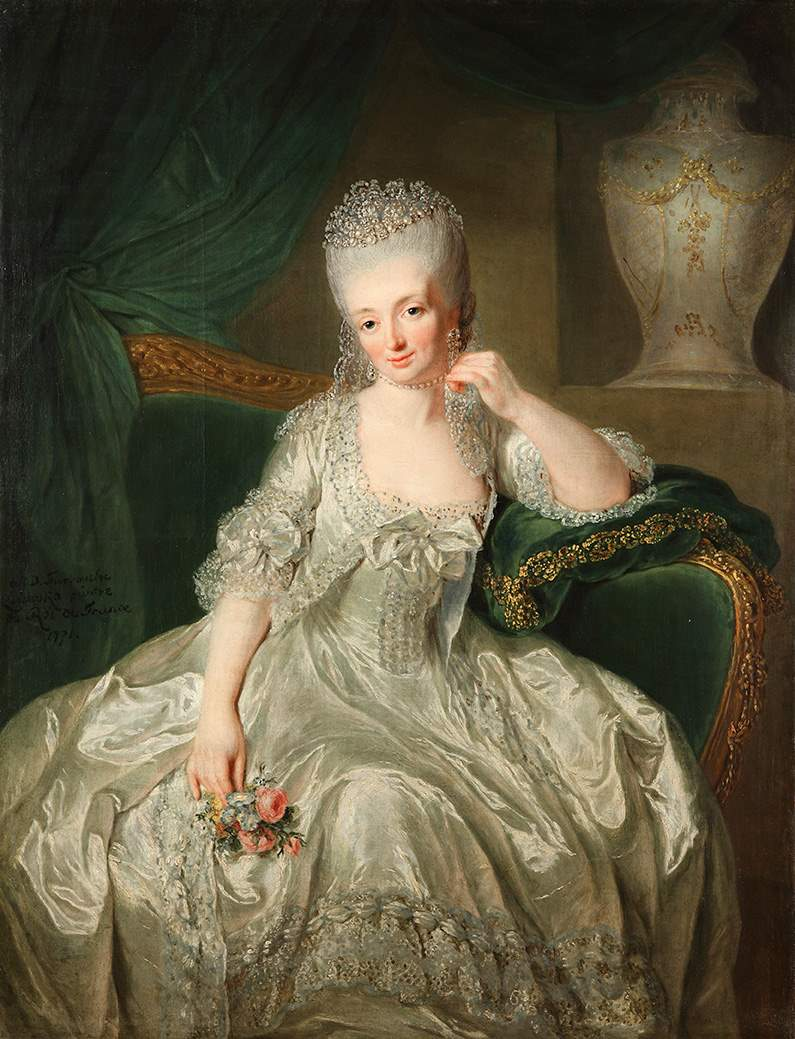
Anna Amalia, Abbess of Quedlinburg, 1771

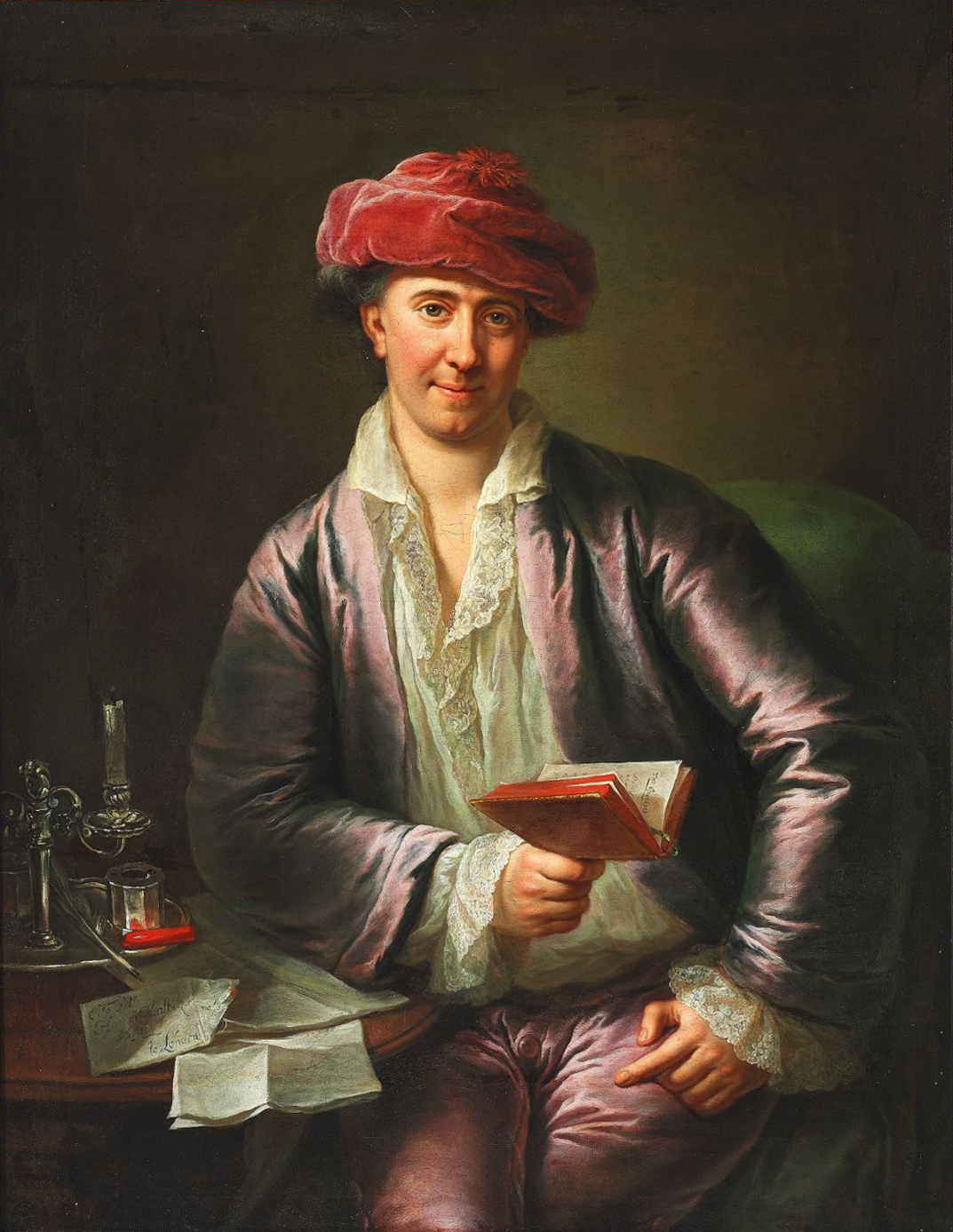
Heinrich Albert Thalbitzer, 1762

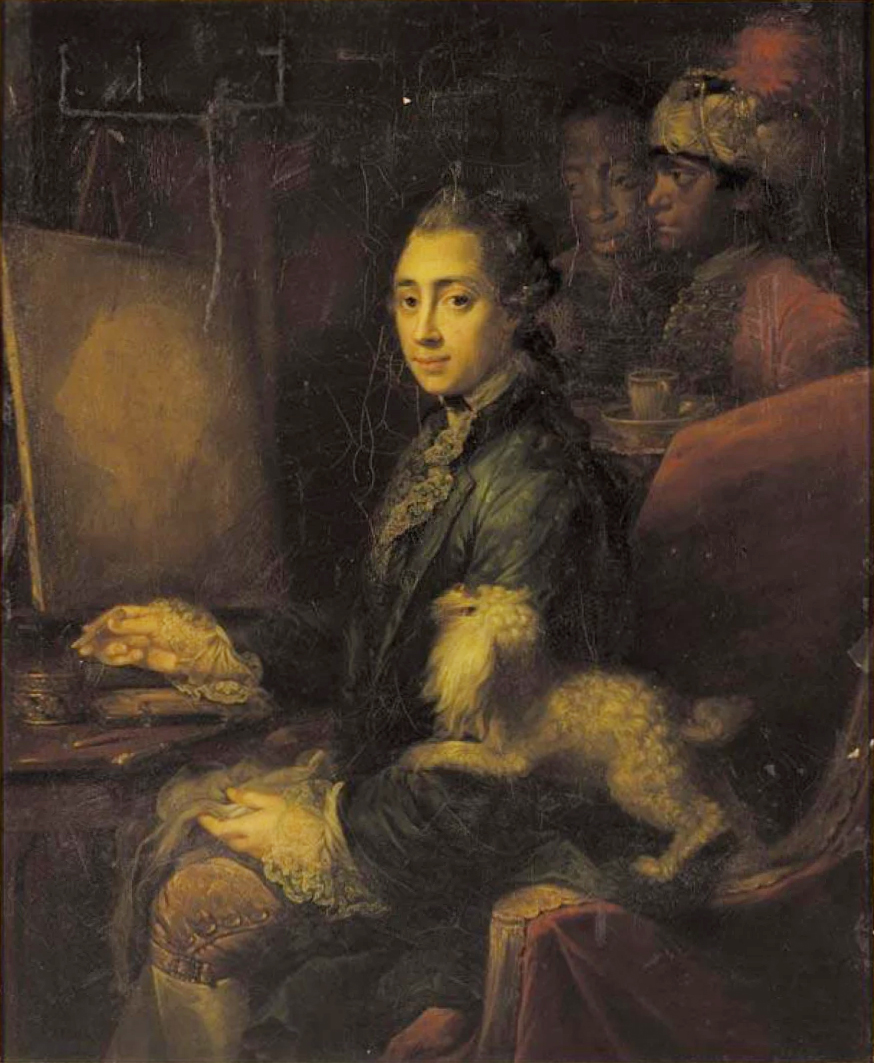
Duke Ernest Gottlob of Mecklenburg

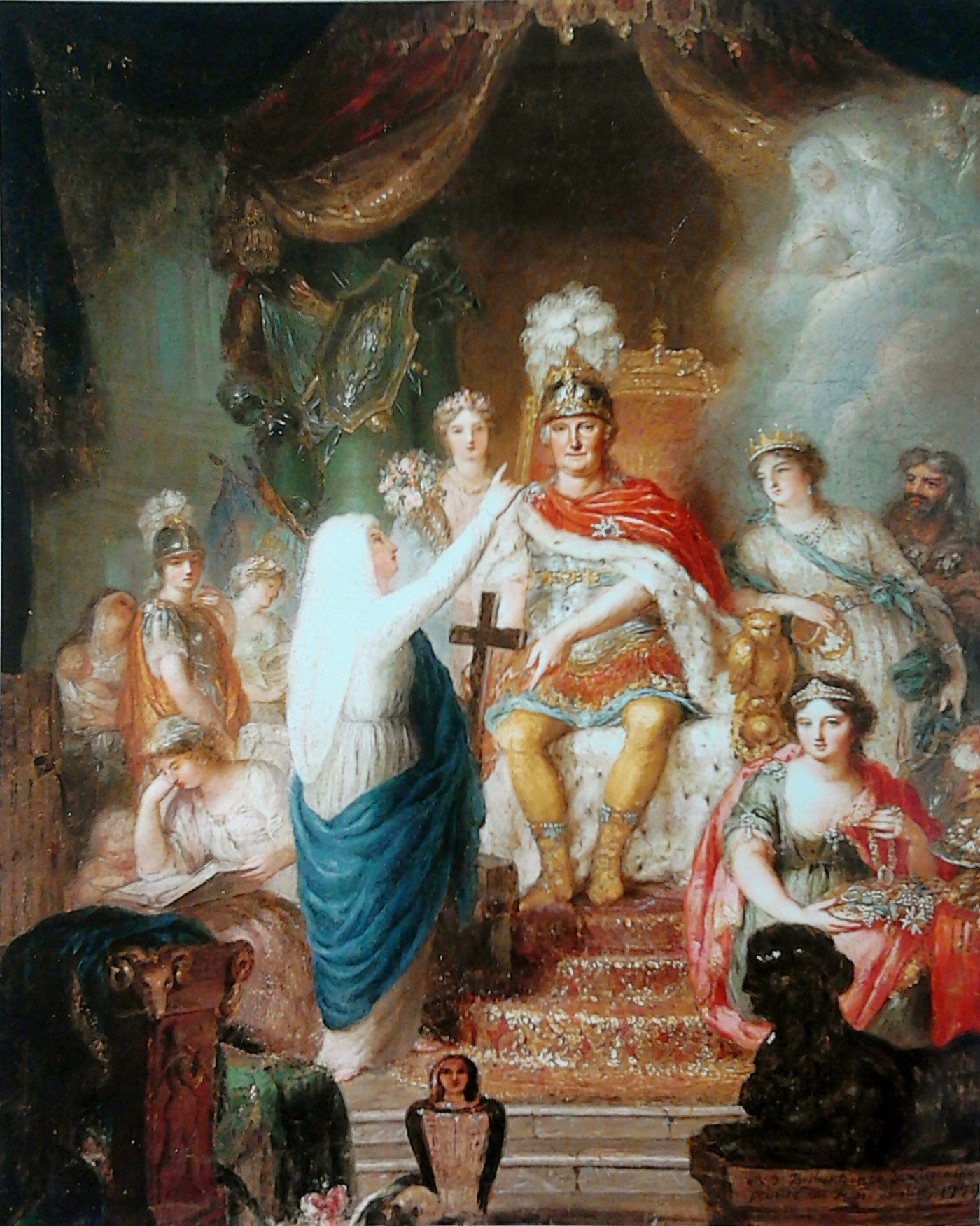
Apotheosis of Prince Augustus Ferdinand of Prussia, 1779

== References and sources ==
This article was translated from its equivalent in the German Wikipedia on 20 July 2009.

- Katharina Küster, Beatrice Scherzer and Andrea Fix: Der freie Blick. Anna Dorothea Therbusch und Ludovike Simanowiz. Zwei Porträtmalerinnen des 18. Jahrhunderts. (Catalog for exhibition at the Metropolitan Museum Ludwigsburg, Kunstverein Ludwigsburg, Villa Franck, 2002/2003), Kehrer Verlag Heidelberg, ISBN 3-933257-85-9
- Bärbel Kovalevski (ed.): Zwischen Ideal und Wirklichkeit, Künstlerinnen der Goethe-Zeit zwischen 1750 und 1850, exhibition catalogue, Hatje Crantz Verlag, Gotha, Constance, 1999, ISBN 3-7757-0806-5
- Frances Borzello: Wie Frauen sich sehen. Selbstbildnisse aus fünf Jahrhunderten. Karl Blessing Verlag Munich 1998.
- Gottfried Sello: Malerinnen aus fünf Jahrhunderten. Ellert und Richter, Hamburg 1988, ISBN 3-89234-077-3
