= Lautensack =

Lautensack is a surname. Notable people with the surname include:

- Hanns Lautensack (1524–c. 1560), German painter and etcher
- Heinrich Lautensack (1522–1590), German painter and goldsmith
- Paul Lautensack (1478–1558), German painter and organist, father of Hanns Lautensack and Heinrich Lautensack
