= Christ and the Sheep Shed =

Polemical woodcut from 1524

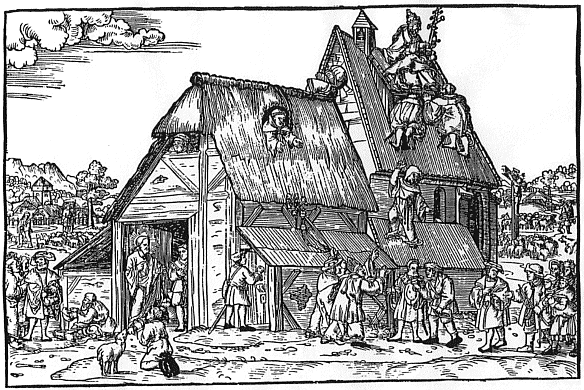
Christ and the Sheep Shed, by Barthel Beham, 1524

Christ and the Sheep Shed is a polemical woodcut made in 1524 by the Nuremberg artist Barthel Beham, one of the Little Masters. Created in the early part of the Protestant Reformation, this woodcut illustrates the beliefs of the artist, as well as other reformers, about the manipulation of the Catholic hierarchy. His work was influenced by reformers, such as Martin Luther, as well as other artists like Barthel's older brother, Sebald. This woodcut was created during the height of the peasant revolts and, though they were less severe in Nuremberg than in other parts of Germany, the social implications were greatly felt. Though there is little information on this particular woodcut, it represents much of the political and social aspects of the Reformation, and interpretation provides insight on the artist's perspective of the era. The distribution of woodcuts was one of the most effective modes of propaganda during the Protestant Reformation. Christ and the Sheep Shed depicts the radical sentiment of the period in which it was created, and portrays the wide-ranging effects of the Reformation and religion on all aspects of German culture. The image is unrealistic as an authentic situation. However, it was used as a symbolic interpretation of the Catholic Church’s manipulation over people and their faith.

== Historical context and interpretation ==
In 1517, Martin Luther posted his Ninety-Five Theses to the wall of the Castle Church in Wittenberg attacking several practices of the Catholic Church; in particular the use of indulgences. His theology argued that the sins of man could never be revealed but that Christ’s grace could save them. Among many reactions to this, a consequence was the criticism of religion and an increased amount of artwork for the propagation of the denial of the Catholic Church. "Christ and the Sheep Shed" was created in 1524, several years after Luther's posting, and demonstrates the long-lasting effect this act had. Barthel's inspiration comes from his elder brother, Hans Sebald Beham, and the well-known artist, Albrecht Dürer. He was born in Nuremberg in 1502 and it is suggested that he studied in the workshop of Dürer, which had significant influences on his artwork and decisions made in his career.

The premise of this woodcut is based on a passage from the Bible, John 10:1-42. This passage articulates Christ as the shepherd, his followers as the flock, and all others as thieves. "All who ever came before me were thieves and robbers, but the sheep did not listen to them. I am the gate; whoever enters through me will be saved". Barthel used characters in this scene that clearly show the Papacy as the "thieves"; they are climbing the sheep shed and entering through windows in the approach of a thief. At the top of the shed is the Pope, symbolizing his authority and domination over the rest of the church hierarchy. The shed is deliberately shaped by Beham to look like a church, with its steeple and cathedral-like windows, to avoid any confusion of what the scene attempts to depict. Christ is in the front doorway of the shed, as he is the ‘gate’ to be entered through. Also seen are peasants grovelling to the nobility, which demonstrates Barthel's sympathy towards the peasantry. In the bottom-right corner of the woodcut people are gathered to buy indulgences, portraying the anxiety about salvation. In the background a crucifixion scene is created; what is strange is that it is less visible than the shed and the church hierarchy, showing the insignificance of the actions of Christ himself, and an emphasis on the use of indulgences in the Catholic Church. The scene created by Barthel depicts the mood of Germany in 1524 as a conflicted place between Protestantism and Catholicism, as well as the observations of the artist himself. His depiction of the Papacy as thieves is impractical, yet its reasoning is to exaggerate the situation to make the idea more influential.

== Propaganda and distribution ==
Prior to the reformation, woodcuts were used as devotional images in monastic centres. Artists would be hired to create a woodcut that would illustrate text in chronicles. They found a new purpose when they were used to support humanism in the reformation. The communication and spread of ideas was central to this time period. Arguably, the reformation would not have been as influential without the use of the printing press. Gutenberg’s invention allowed the mass production of texts, giving Luther and his contemporaries the opportunity for widespread theology. Woodcuts were printed on covers of texts to increase interest of potential readers. However, sixteenth-century German society was predominantly illiterate. The learned areas were in the centre of towns and cities, but these numbers remained few. Print culture required a particular social group with the ability to absorb the information at hand. For reforms to be effective then, the reformers would need to target the entire population and not simply the educated elites. Paintings and woodcuts, such as Christ and the Sheep Shed, provided visual interpretations of papal corruption which required no literacy whatsoever. Interpretations could be made by the people themselves, facilitated by popular knowledge and word of mouth. Often woodcuts were accompanied by text; nevertheless, this was only used to assist the depiction and message thereof, not to stand independent from it. The printed text was usually simple requiring only basic reading skills. Even without this text the illustrations were to the point and understandable without a broad based knowledge of politics or further explanation.

Woodcuts were used rather than engravings on copper to produce thousands of copies without wearing out the plate. The cost of woodcuts depended on the cost of the paper, which by the sixteenth century was high, as printing increased. Religious art that depicted the Papacy as anything but pious often provoked physical acts against the clergy and nobility. On Easter day 1525, in Upper Swabia, peasants started taking a more militant attitude. Johann Herlot wrote a report on the instances: "...the peasants roused themselves... [They] arrived so unexpectedly that the count and his subordinates could not return to the castle..."

== Radicalism ==
The radicals of the Reformation are hard to define because they were so large in numbers and occupied a variety of beliefs. Barthel Beham was radical in his beliefs on the Bible and the sacraments, like numerous other reformers, and he portrayed this through many pieces of artwork. He sympathized with the peasants, especially during the German Peasants' War. When Luther attacked the peasantry in an article in May 1525, Against the Robbing and Murdering Hordes of Peasants, he wrote, "...we must go beyond our duty, and offer the mad peasants an opportunity to come to terms...if that does not help, then swiftly grasp the sword". That year Barthel, along with his brother Sebald and painter, Georg Pencz, were exiled from Nuremberg on account of their radical views on religious and political concerns. When questioned on their views of Christ, Barthel replied in a manner suggesting that he did not believe in him. From this incident these three artists were given the name "the Godless painters" and were shunned by different groups of society. These radical views began because the pace of the reforms was seen as moving too slow. Large groups of people wanted changes implemented immediately, but when this did not happen radical efforts were made. In Wittenberg, the reformer Karlstadt, protested against the worshipping of images and promoted their destruction (iconoclasm). This was a form of radical reformation. Luther and Karlstadt had very different approaches on matters concerning the implementation of reforms, teachings and artwork in general. "Every community, whether small or large, should see for itself that it acts correctly and well and waits for no one." This depicts the mood of Germany at the time of reform and the desire for quick change, which frequently resulted in violent actions to see an outcome. As a result of Karlstadt's promotion of the defacing of religious artwork and advocation of speedy changes, he and Luther had a falling out after years of companionship.

Not only did radicalism stem from the desire for a speedier reformation, but also from dissatisfaction of it altogether. As his expulsion from Nuremberg illustrates, Barthel was not happy with the reforms that Luther or his equals were enforcing; as a result he denied Christ as legitimate; thus the given name, "the godless painters".

== Social and political implications ==
The Reformation quickly spread its impact from being purely religious into political and social concerns. Beham's woodcut Peasant Holiday further depicts his feelings on the oppression of the peasantry. In it, the dominant classes are violently attacking the peasants with swords, while the women try to intercept. The perpetual use of the peasantry in religious, social and political matters shows the interconnection of the three. The political and moral upheaval that Germany faced as a result of the reformation is seen in the German Peasants' War. Many feared an overthrow of the existing social order; Barthel's pieces of art facilitated this as he often reflected the oppression of the peasantry and the advocation of uprising against the elite. More people became concerned with politics and therefore the interest in pamphlets grew. Consequently, so did the proportion of learned people and literacy. Many of the criticisms made in these pamphlets, accompanied by woodcuts, were against Church hierarchy and predominantly towards the Pope. He was portrayed as a demon, the anti-Christ, a thief, and a hoarding rich-man. However, many others were targeted in a negative religious aspect as well. Such people were economic figures. Attacking the sale of indulgences and monopolies on the church, an artist depicted a merchant marking up prices in the sale of these indulgences. In this, the artist was arguing for the return of order and morality to the Catholic Church. Though it is a religious piece, it includes social issues, and reveals the influence that artists had over popular opinion. Artists such as the Beham brothers and Georg Pencz created woodcuts that were widely distributed. That these artists were questioned at their trial about their feelings about Christ shows the fear that authorities had about their influence on society, as does their ejection from Nuremberg after the trial. In 1527, after returning to Nuremberg following his expulsion, Barthel left permanently to become a court painter to the Catholic dukes in Munich. This suggests that his religious beliefs were irrelevant to his need for income.

Reformation art helped promote print publishing; many people opened print shops and publishing industries because there was an increased demand for pamphlets and propaganda.

== Notes ==
=== References ===
- Briggs, Asa; Burke, Peter (2002). A Social History of the Media: From Gutenburd to the Internet. Cambridge: Polity Press.
- Christensen, Carl C. (1979). Art and the Reformation in Germany. Boulder, CO: University of Colorado.
- Dixon, C. Scott (1996). The Reformation and Rural Society. Cambridge: Cambridge University Press.
- Lindberg, Carter (2007). The European Reformations. Boston: Blackwell Publishing.
- Melton, James Van Horn (2002). Cultures of Communication from Reformation to Enlightenment. Burlington: Ashgate Publishing.
- Moxey, Keith (1989). Peasants, Warriors and Wives: Popular Imagery in the Reformation. Chicago, IL: The University of Chicago Press.
- Reinhart, Max (1998). Infinite Boundaries: Order, Disorder and Reorder in Early Modern German Culture. Kirksville: Sixteenth Century Journal Publishers.
- Scribner, R. W. (1987). Popular Culture and Popular Movements in Reformation Germany. London: The Hambledon Press.
