= Hanns Lautensack =

German etcher and draughtsman (1524–c. 1560)

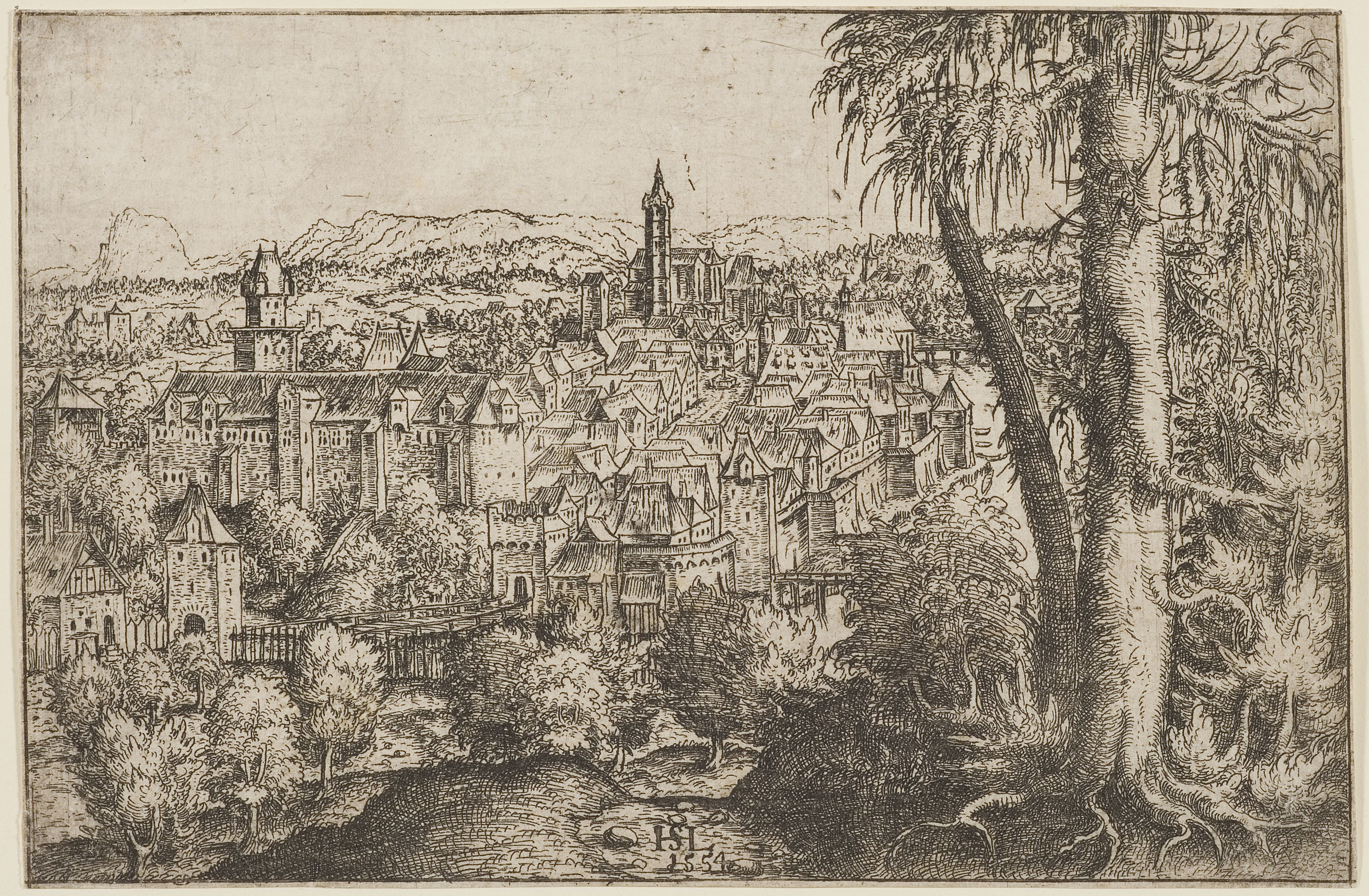
View of Steyr, etching by Hanns Lautensack (1554)

Hanns Lautensack (sometimes erroneously referred to as Hans Sebald Lautensack) (1524 – c. 1560) was a German etcher and draughtsman.

He was one of two sons of Paul Lautensack, a painter of Bamberg, where he was born in 1524. When still a child his parents settled in Nuremberg, and there he lived during the greater portion of his life. In 1556 he was working in Vienna. He may have been summoned to Vienna by the Emperor, Ferdinand I, to make pictures of his collection of coins from antiquity. He died in Vienna sometime between 1564 and 1566. His etchings are generally marked with a monogram composed of the letters H. S. L. His brother Heinrich was a goldsmith.

Lautensack is known primarily for his etchings. Stylistically, these can be divided into two periods, one from the time when he was working in Nuremberg and the other comprising his Vienna years.

The Nuremberg etchings include several portraits of burghers of the city portrayed by a window opening on to a distant landscape. In his treatment of the subject matter, Lautensack here displays influences from the Little Masters and the Danube school; as for individual artistic links, Barthel Beham, Sebald Beham, Georg Pencz, Albrecht Altdorfer and Wolfgang Huber can be mentioned.

In Vienna, Lautensack received more prestigious commissions, making portraits for the aristocracy and similar commissions. He contributed to several illustrated books. His style of portraits became more mannered, similar to that of the School of Fontainebleau, while his landscapes drew more inspiration from Netherlandish printmaking, notably Hieronymus Cock.

In his characterisation of Lautensack, Michael Bryan notes that his landscapes are etched in a dark, forbidding style; and also opines that some portraits, etched and finished with the graver, possess considerable merit.

Arthur Mayger Hind points to similarities with the etchings made by Augustin Hirschvogel and Albrecht Altdorfer, but notes that "the usual charm of this school of landscape is in Lautensack somewhat marred by the overcrowding of detail, and in the attempt at working more in a painter's manner the value of line is lost."
