= Heinrich Lautensack =

German painter and goldsmith (1522–1590)

Heinrich Lautensack (1522–1590) was a painter and goldsmith from the Holy Roman Empire.

Lautensack was born at Bamberg in 1522. He was a son of Paul Lautensack, with whom he went to Nuremberg whilst young. In 1550 he went to Frankfurt, where he established the first collection of paintings, and in 1553 published a treatise on "Perspective". He died at Frankfurt in 1590. Some plates are attributed to him, but on very insufficient grounds; they are in the style of Hans Sebald Beham, though much inferior.

Lautensack's brother Hans was also a printmaker.
