= Godless Painters =

Term to refer to Sebald and Barthel Beham and George Pencz

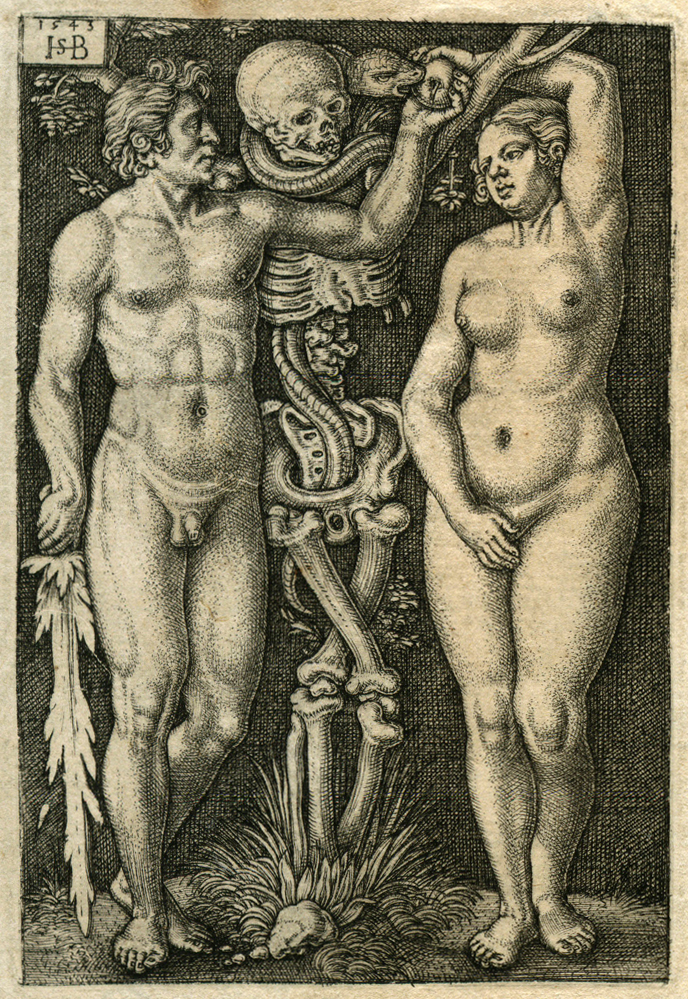
Sebald Beham, Adam and Eve, 1543, 82 x 56 mm.

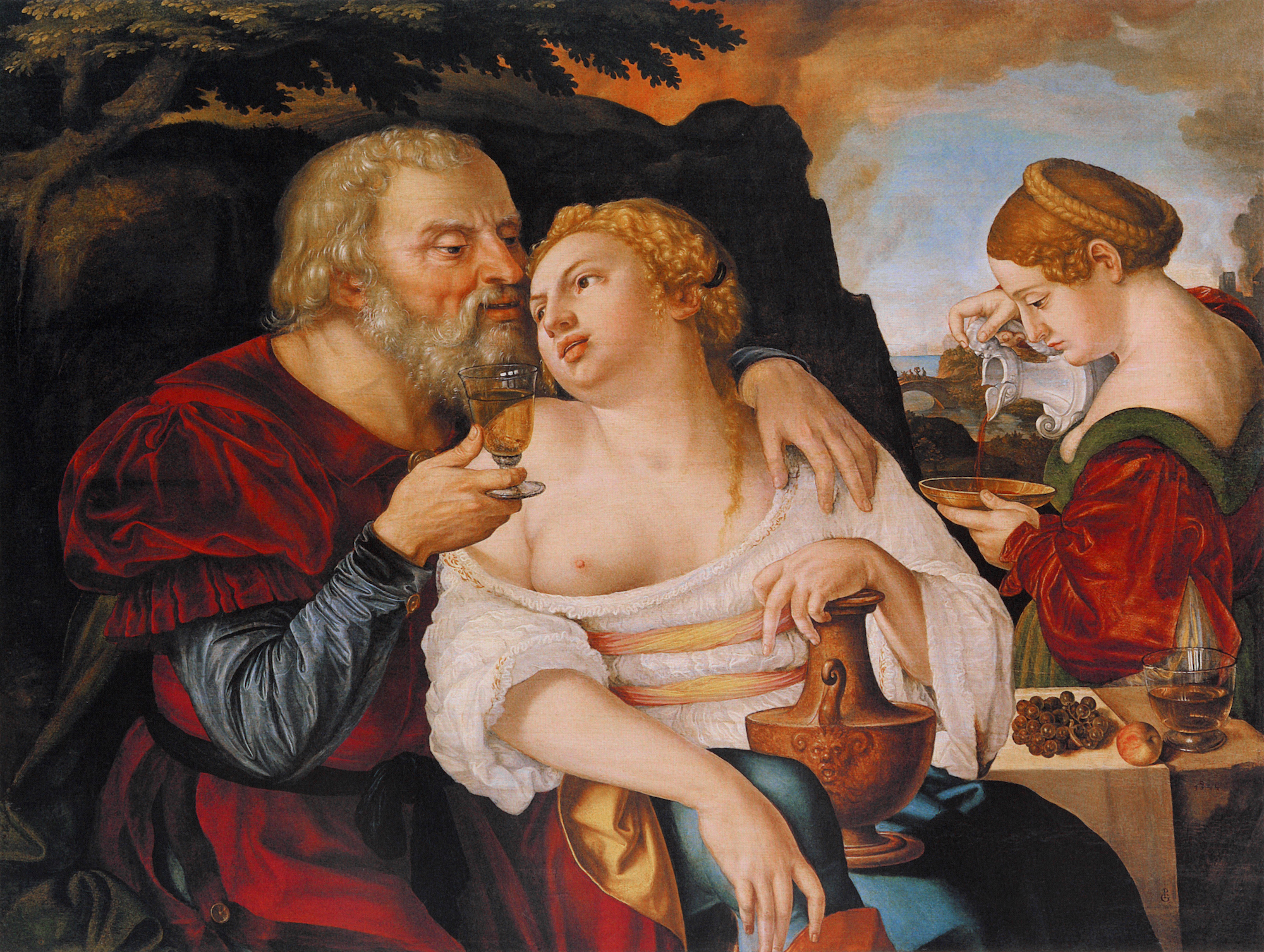
George Pencz, Lot and his daughters, 1544.

"Godless painters" is a term used by art historians to refer to Sebald Beham, his brother Barthel, and George Pencz, as exemplified in the title of a 2011 catalog of the Beham brothers' works, The Godless Painters of Nuremberg: Convention and Subversion in the Printmaking of the Beham Brothers. The epithet was coined in derision of the three painters during an inquest conducted by the Lutheran dominated city council of Nuremberg in 1525, which concerned the artists' protestant heterodoxy. The term is a double entendre alluding both to the content of the "godless painters'" works and to the doctrinal views for which they were condemned. The typically small-scale prints often depicted biblical or moral themes with a touch of eroticism. The "godless painters" are also considered to be leading representatives of the group of little masters.

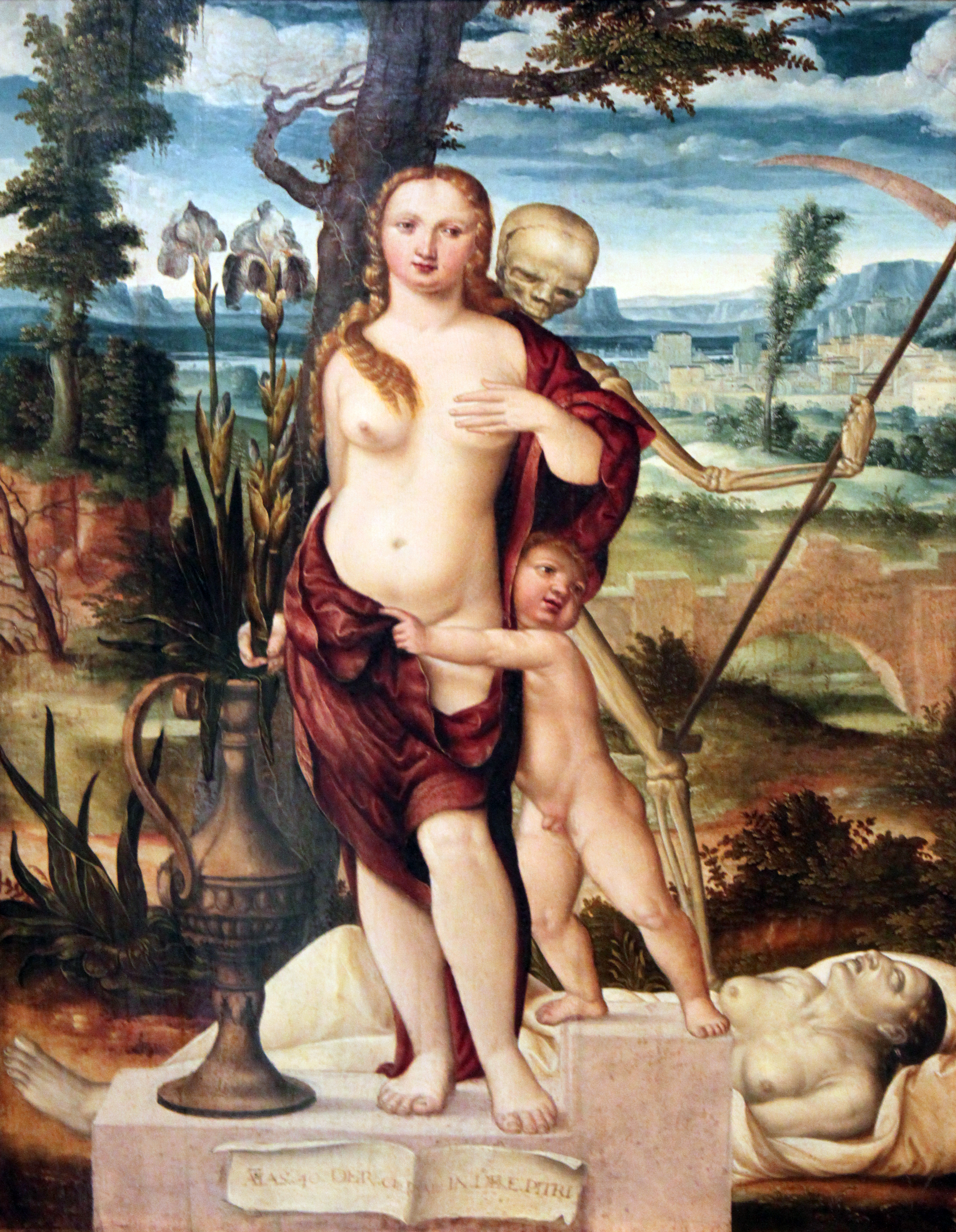
Barthel Beham, Vanity, 1540, Hamburger Kunsthalle.

The inquest consisted of numerous interrogations concerning matters of baptism, the Eucharist, and the role of secular authorities. Imprisonment and torture were threatened, but ultimately the three were condemned to short-term exile from the city.

The inquiries took place during the German Peasants' War, which involved theological controversies between Martin Luther and Thomas Müntzer on the matters at issues in the inquest into the beliefs of the painters.

Historical accounts regarding the painters have often been cursory, and sometimes confused due to the lack of availability of primary sources. The aforementioned catalog, The Godless Painters of Nuremberg, promises to correct this deficit.
