= Paul Lautensack =

German painter and organist (1478–1558)

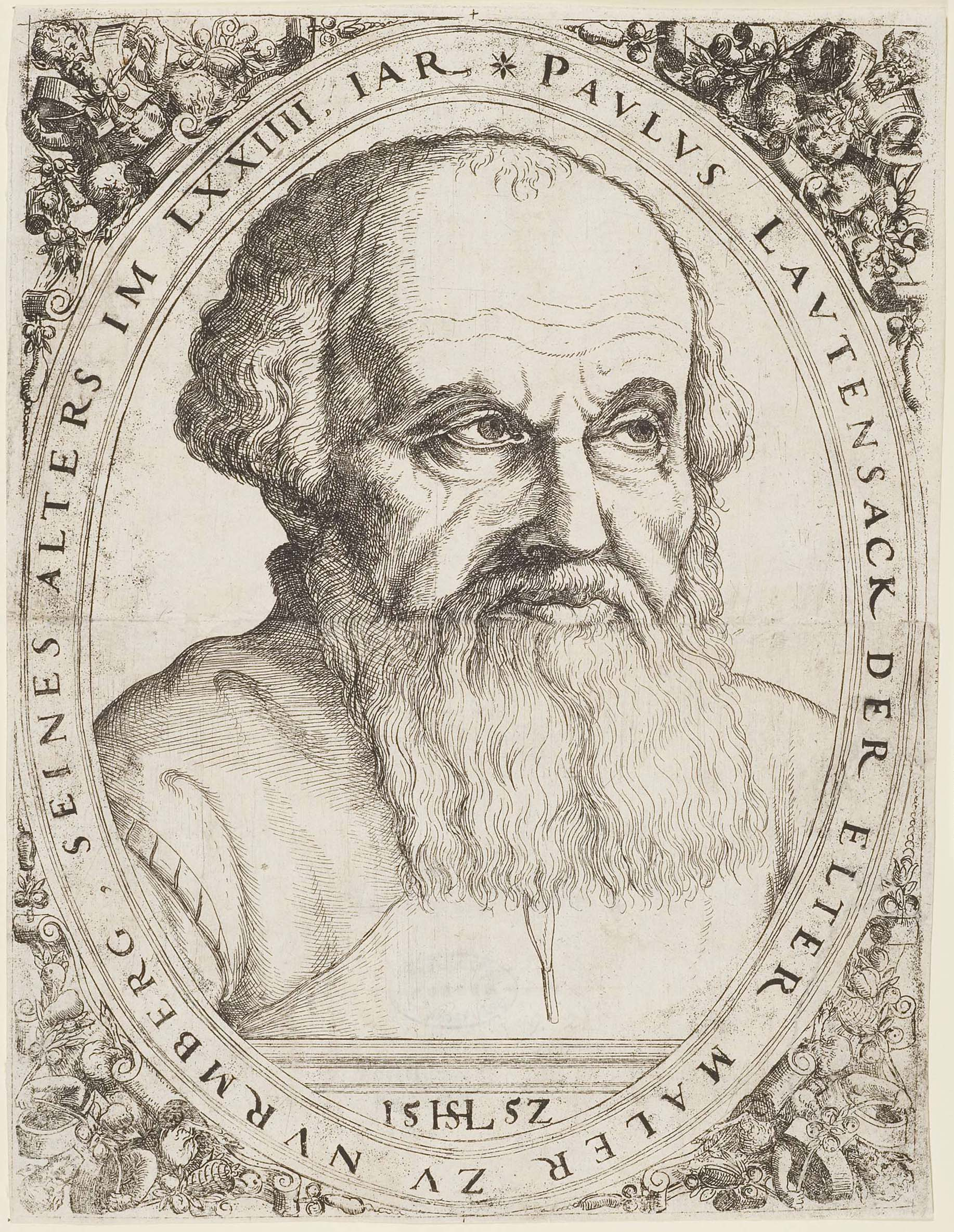
- Portrait of Paul Lautensack made by his son, Hans Sebald Lautensack
- Born: 1478; Bamberg, Germany
- Died: August 15, 1558
- Occupations: Painter, Organist
- Children: Hans Sebald Lautensack, Heinrich Lautensack

Paul Lautensack (1478 – 15 August 1558) was a German painter and organist.

Lautensack was born in Bamberg, but in 1525, on account of his having embraced the Reformation, he left that city and settled in Nuremberg. There he painted many subjects from the Apocalypse, and also wrote some treatises upon it, which were collected and published in Frankfurt in 1619. However, his fanaticism became such a public nuisance that he was in 1542 expelled from the city. After a time he was allowed to return, and is believed to have died there in 1558. Some of his paintings still exist in Bamberg, chiefly copies of the prints of Martin Schongauer and the woodcuts of Albrecht Dürer. His portrait, dated 1529, is in the Germanic Museum at Nuremberg.

The first major study of Lautensack by Berthold Kress was published in 2014, Divine Diagrams the Manuscripts and Drawings of Paul Lautensack.

Lautensack was the father of Hans Sebald Lautensack, a painter and printmaker, and the goldsmith and printer Heinrich Lautensack.
