= Barthel Beham =

German engraver and miniaturist (1502–1540)

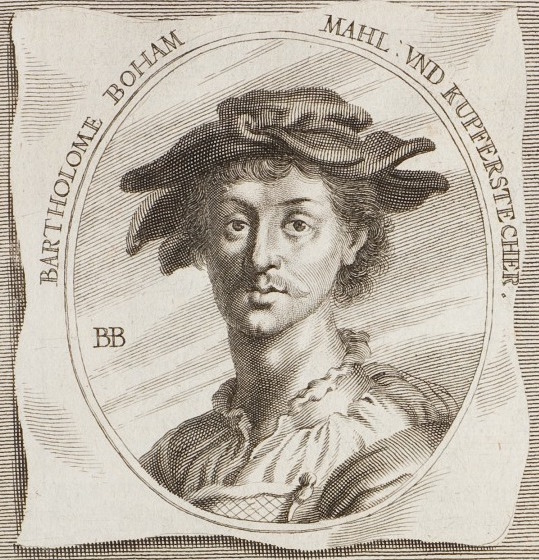
- Born: 1502
- Died: 1540
- Occupations: Painter, court painter (1537–1538), graphic artist, drawer, exlibrist, engraver
- Relatives: Sebald Beham

Barthel Beham (or Bartel) (1502–1540) was a German engraver, miniaturist, and painter.

== Biography ==
The younger brother of Hans Sebald Beham, he was born into a family of artists in Nuremberg. Learning his art from his elder brother, and Albrecht Dürer, he was particularly active as an engraver during the 1520s, creating tiny works of magnificent detail, positioning him in the German printmaking school known as the "Little Masters". He was also fascinated with antiquity and may have worked with Marcantonio Raimondi in Bologna and Rome at some time in his career.

In 1525, along with his brother and Georg Pencz, the so-called "godless painters", he was banished from Lutheran Nuremberg for asserting his disbelief in baptism, Christ, or transubstantiation. Although later pardoned, he moved to Catholic Munich to work for the Bavarian dukes William IV and Ludwig X. Whilst there, his exceptional talent established him as one of Germany's principal portrait painters, favoured by distinguished patrons such as Emperor Charles V.

According to Joachim von Sandrart, he died in Italy during a trip under the patronage of Duke William.

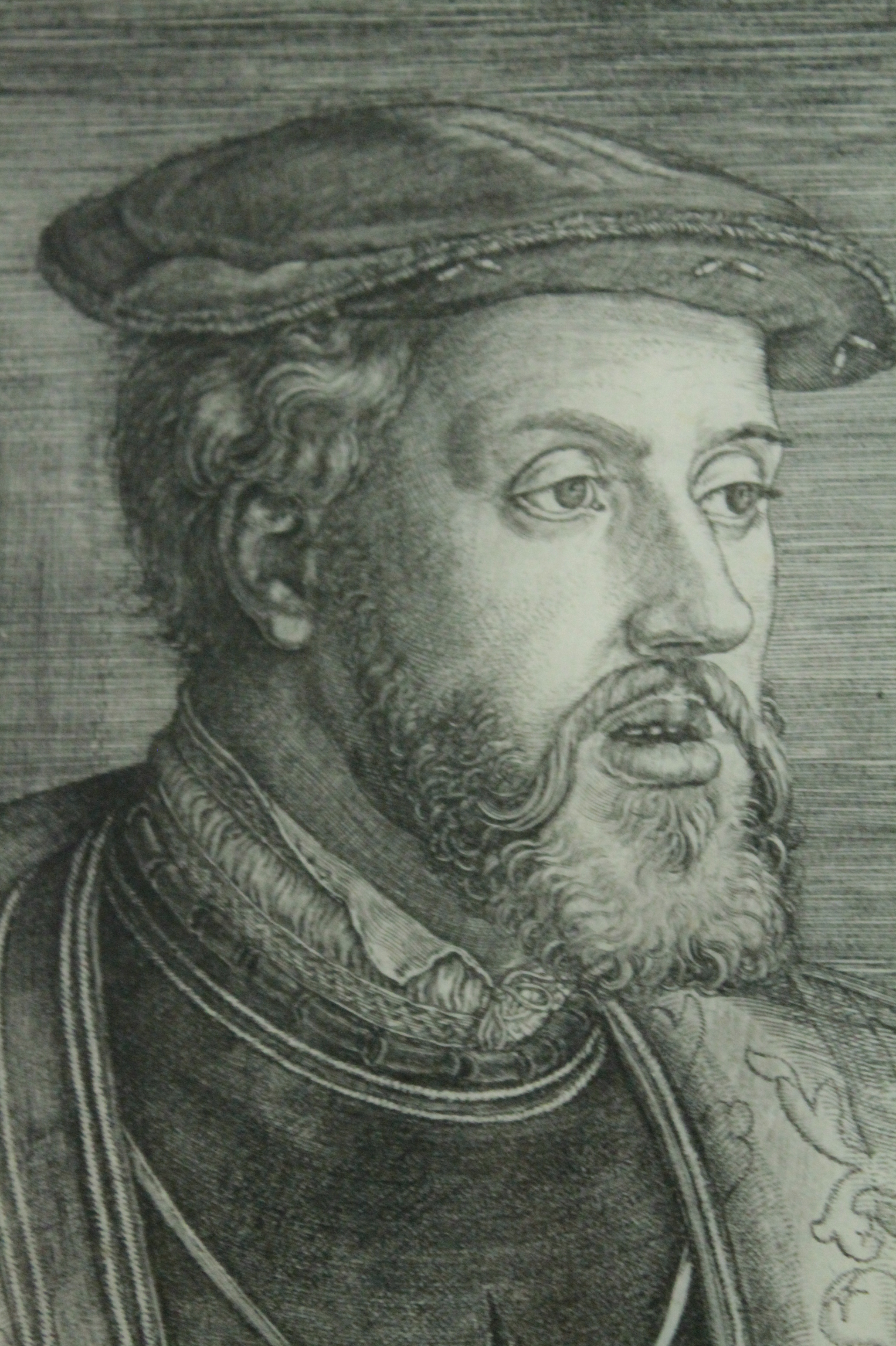
Charles V, Holy Roman Emperor by Barthel Beham 1531

== Gallery ==
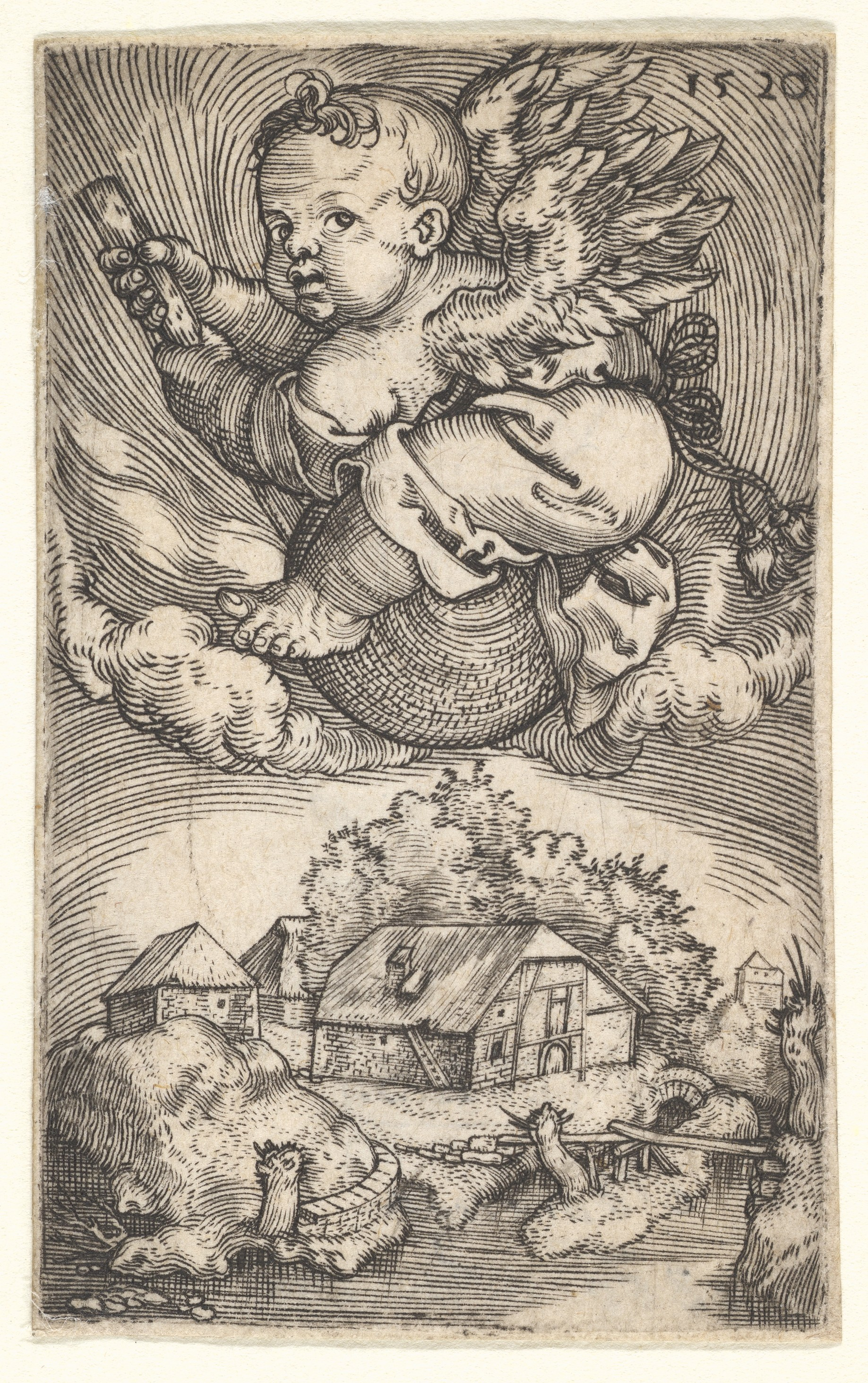
Genius on a Globe Floating in the Air, engraving, 1520, 5.7 × 3.6 cm, perhaps a parody of Dürer's Nemesis.

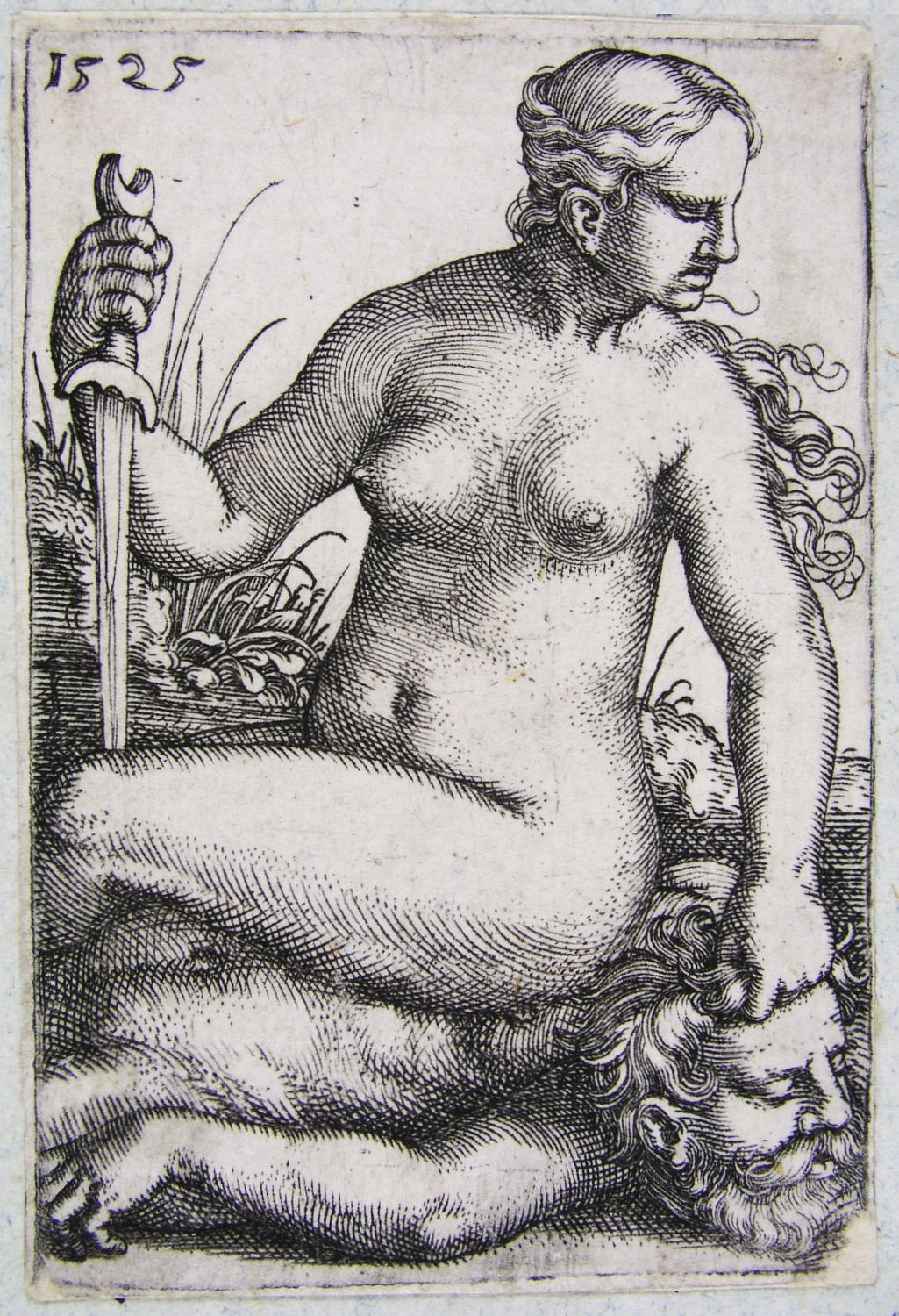
Judith, engraving, 1525

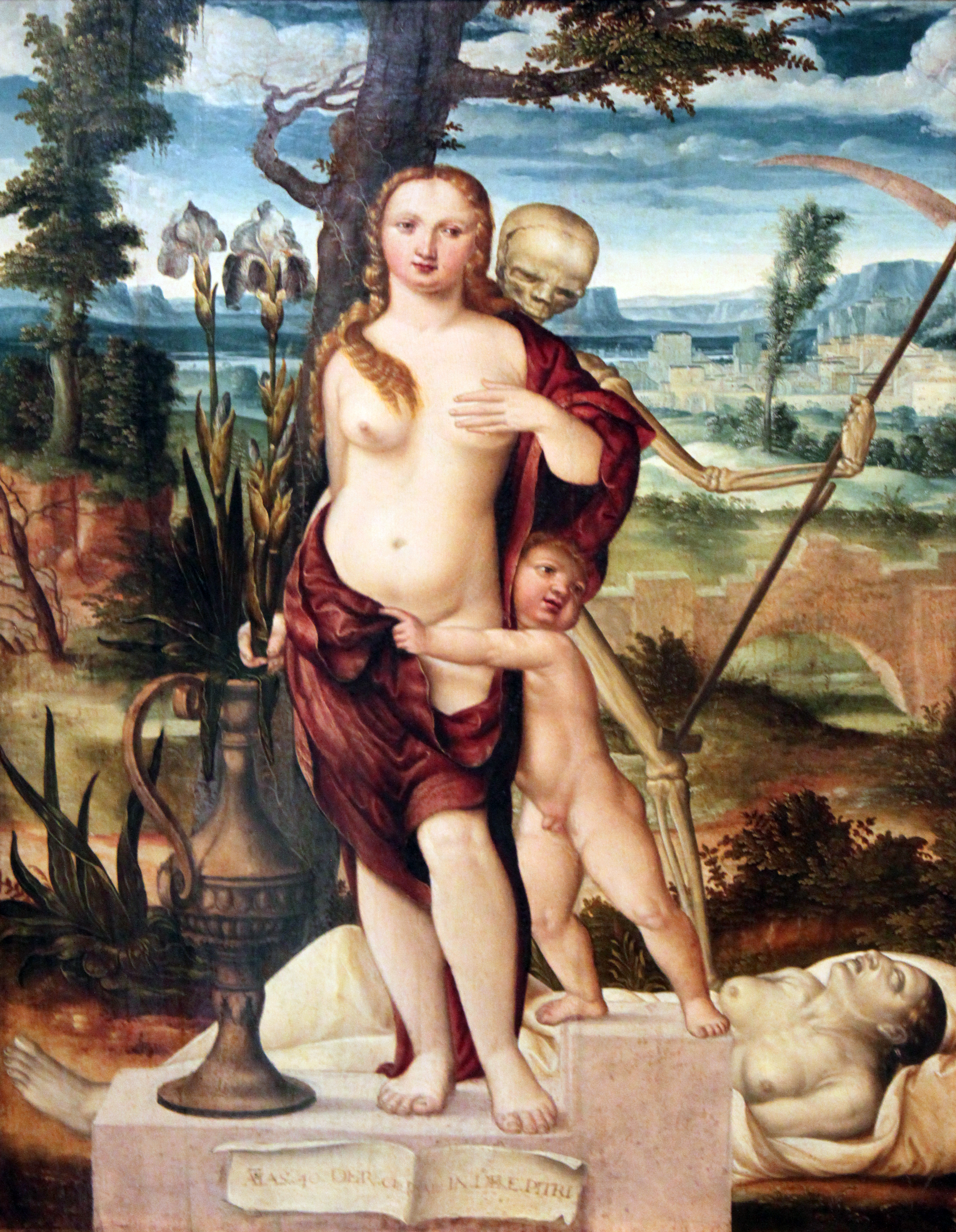
Vanity, 1540, Hamburger Kunsthalle

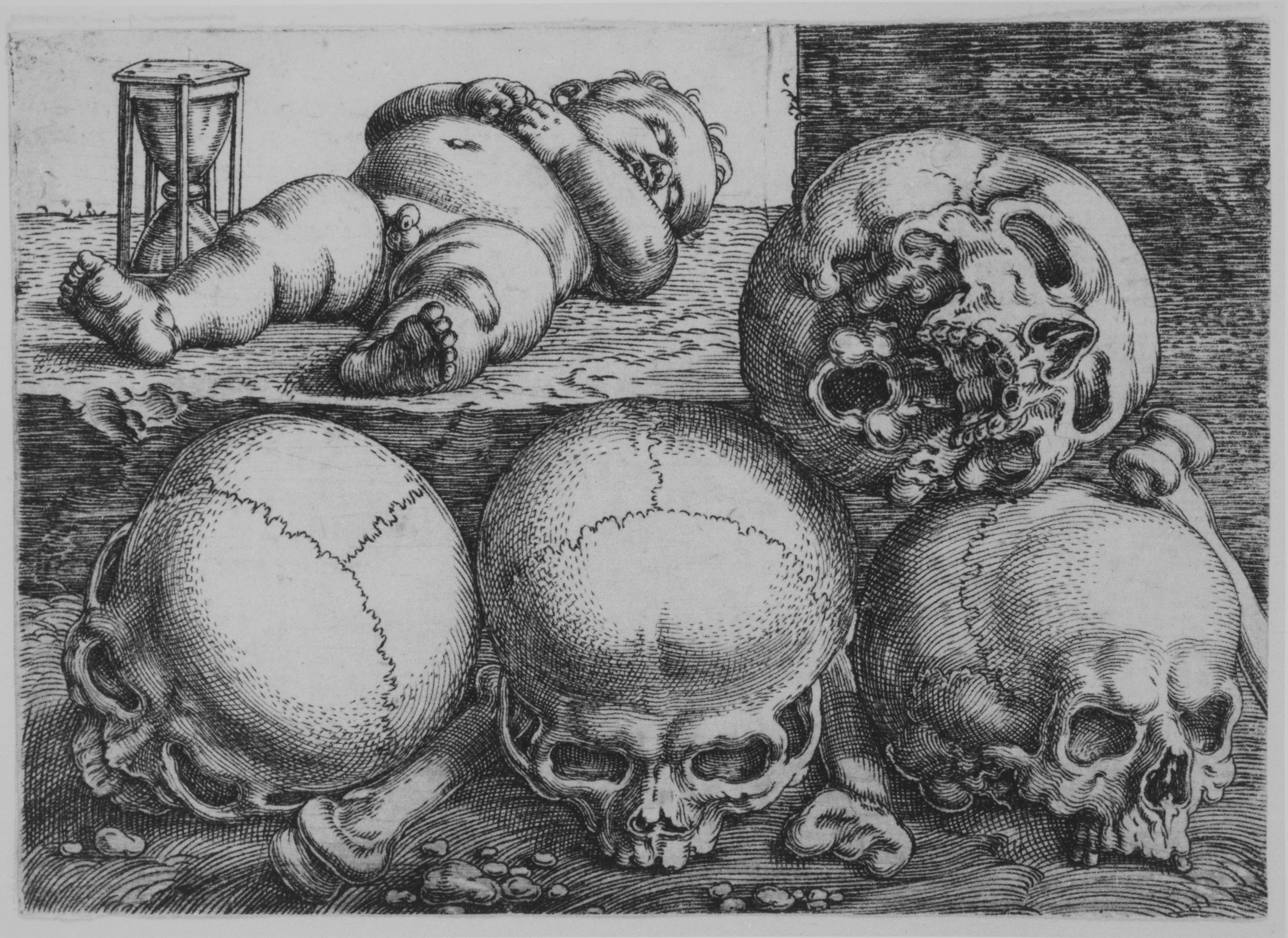
Engraving: Dead Child with Four Skulls

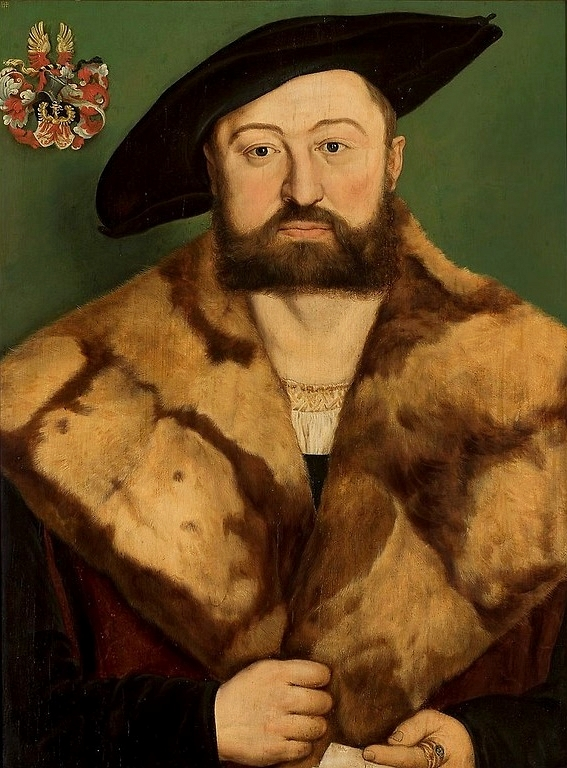
Portrait of the goldsmith Jörg Herz, c. 1525

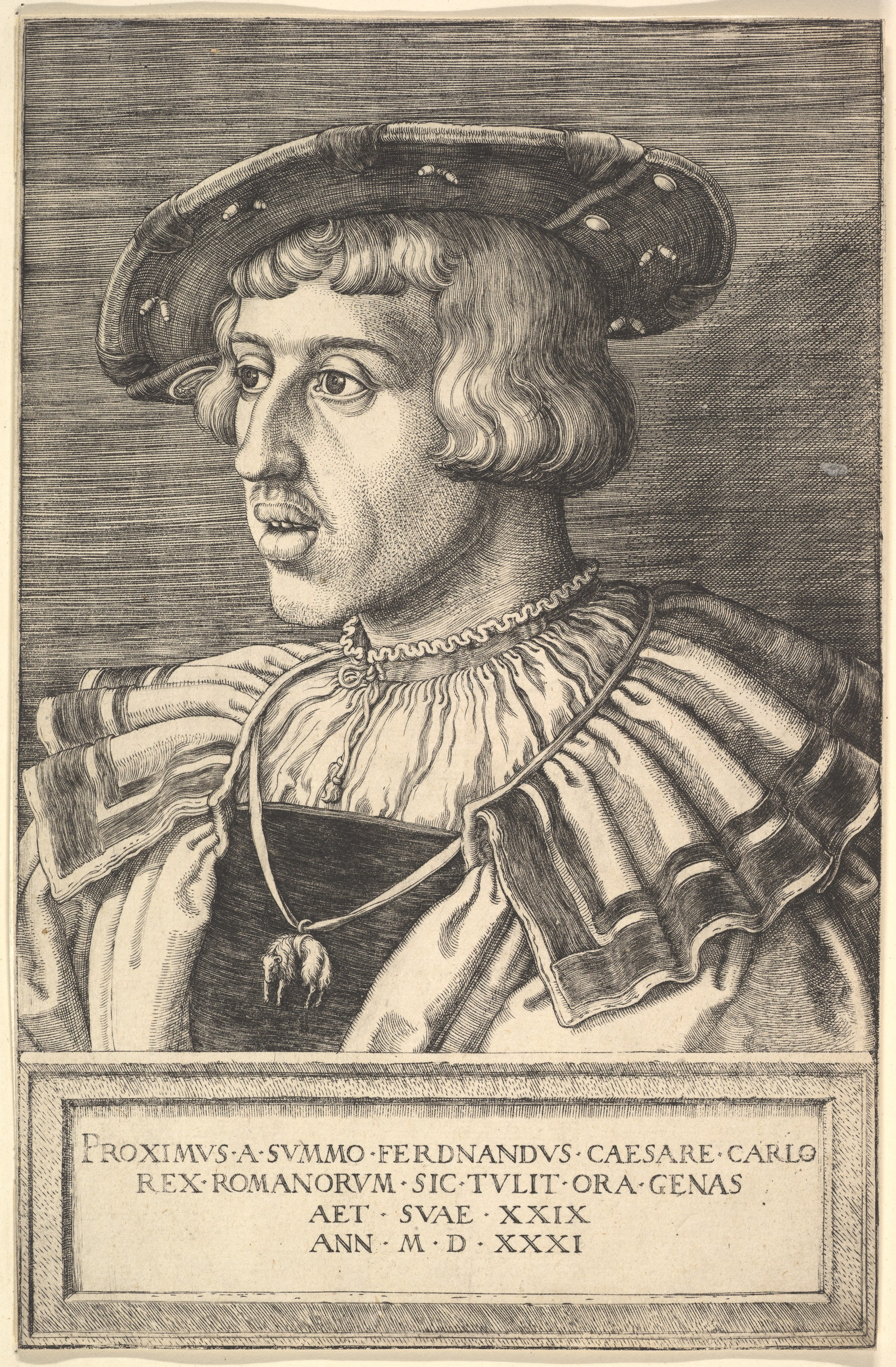
Engraving: The Emperor Ferdinand, 1531

== See also ==
- Christ and the Sheep Shed a polemical woodcut
