= Georg Pencz =

German engraver, painter and printmaker

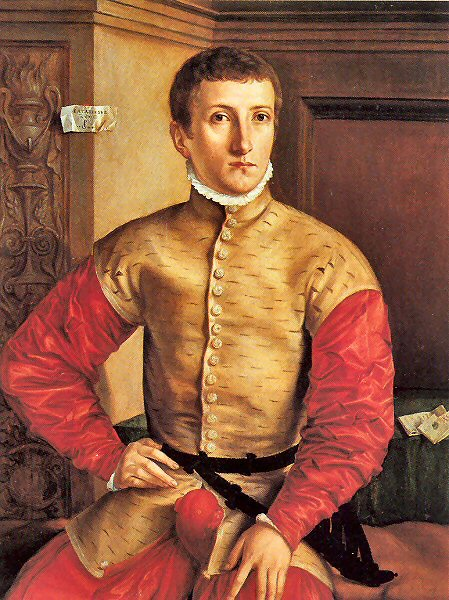
Portrait of a Seated Youth, 1544, Galleria degli Uffizi, Florence

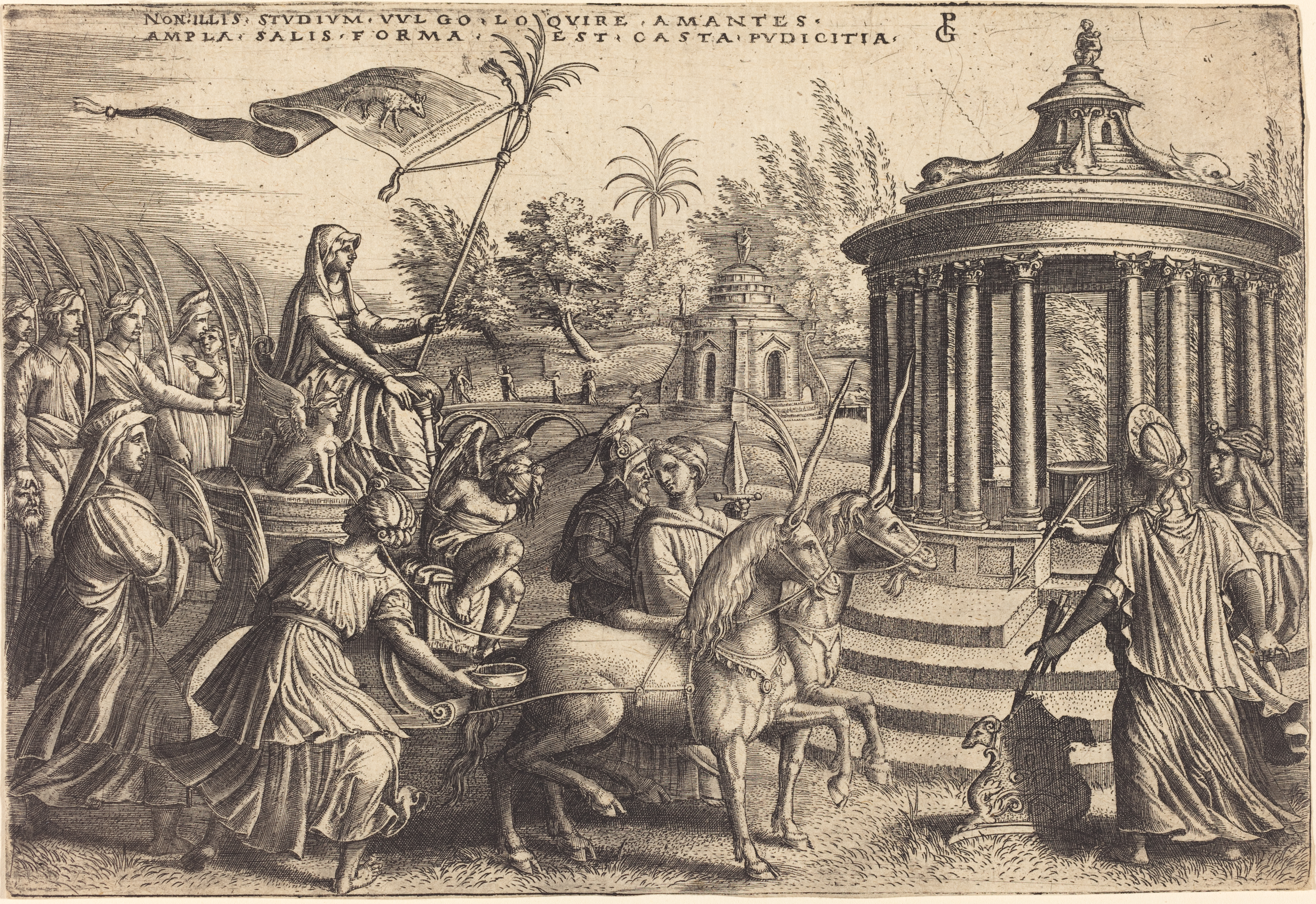
The Triumph of Chastity

Georg Pencz (c. 1500 – 11 October 1550) was a German engraver, painter and printmaker.

Pencz was probably born in Westheim near Bad Windsheim/Franconia. He travelled to Nuremberg in 1523 and joined Albrecht Dürer’s atelier. Like Dürer, he visited Italy and was profoundly influenced by Venetian art; it is believed he worked with Marcantonio Raimondi. In 1525, he was imprisoned with the brothers Barthel Beham and Hans Sebald Beham, the so-called "godless painters", for spreading the radical views of Thomas Müntzer by asserting disbelief in baptism, Christ, and transubstantiation. The three were pardoned shortly afterwards and became part of the group known as the "Little Masters" because of their tiny, intricate, and influential prints.

In Nuremberg, influenced by works he had seen in Italy, Pencz painted a number of trompe-l'œil ceilings in the houses of patrician families; one, for which a drawing survives, showed workmen raising building materials on a hoist, against an open sky, to create the illusion that the room was still under construction.

Around 1539, Pencz briefly returned to Italy, visiting Rome for the first time, returning to Nuremberg in 1540, where he became the city painter and earned his greatest success as a portraitist. As an engraver, he ranks among the best of the German “Little Masters”. Notable prints include Six Triumphs of Petrarch and Life of Christ (26 plates). The best of his paintings are portraits, such as Portrait of a Young Man, Portrait of Marshal Schirmer, and Portrait of Erhard Schwetzer and his wife.

In 1550, he was named court painter by Albert, Duke of Prussia, but died in Leipzig before arriving at the court.

== Legacy: Nazi looting and restitution ==
In March 1939, the Nazi Gestapo seized Pencz's "Young Couple in a Landscape" from the home of Arthur Feldmann, a Jewish collector who was murdered in the Holocaust. The Pencz was sold at Sotheby’s in 1946. The art collector Rosi Schilling donated it to the British Museum, which settled a Nazi spoliation claim from Feldmann's grandson in 2013.
