= Sebald Beham =

German painter and printmaker (1500–1550)

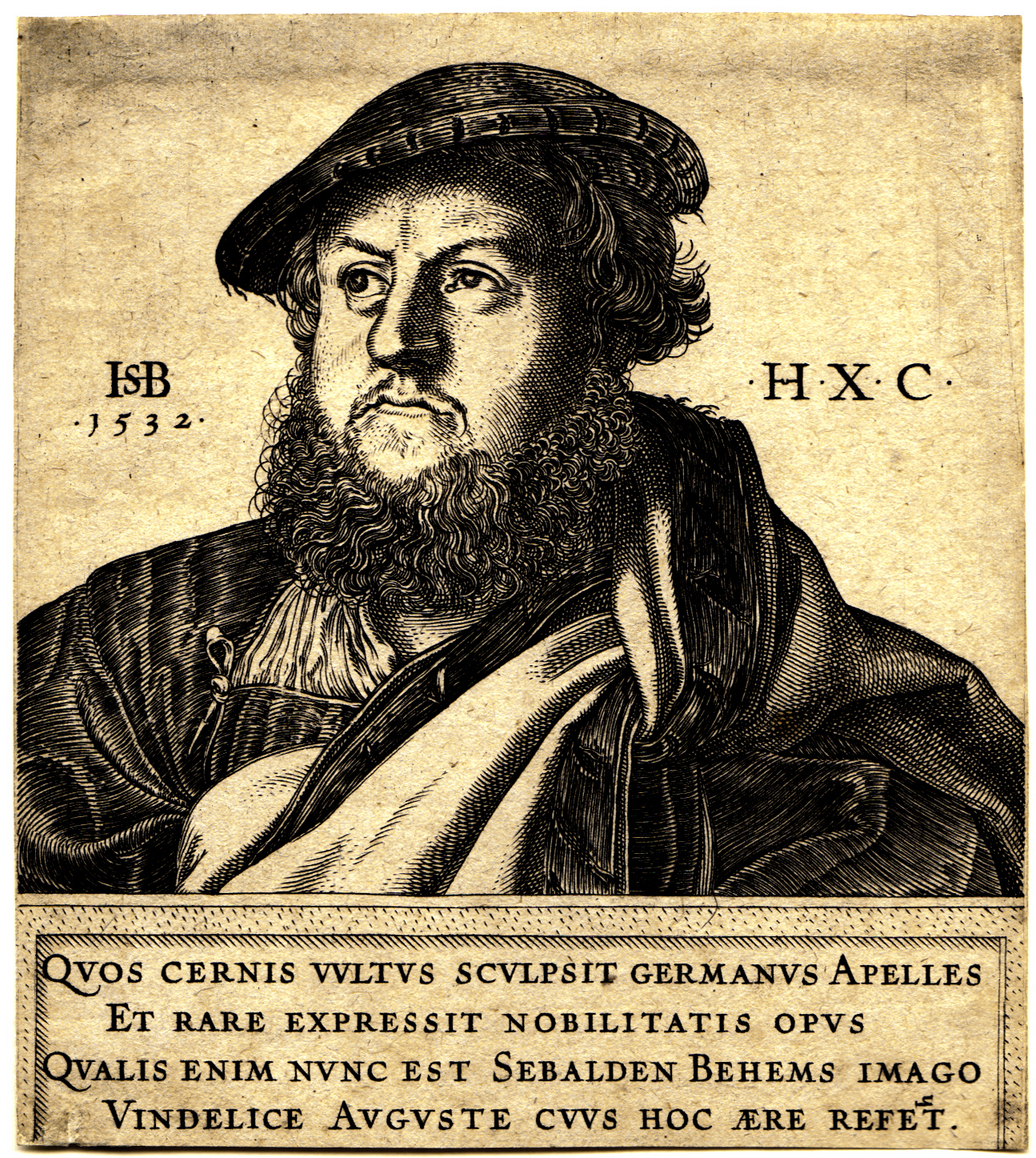
- Born: 1500; Nuremberg
- Died: 22 November 1550; Frankfurt
- Occupations: Painter, printmaker, exlibrist, drawer
- Relatives: Barthel Beham

Sebald Beham (1500–1550) was a German painter and printmaker, mainly known for his very small engravings. Born in Nuremberg, he spent the later part of his career in Frankfurt. He was one of the most important of the "Little Masters", the group of German artists making prints in the generation after Dürer.

His name is often given as Hans Sebald Beham although there is no documentary evidence that he ever used that additional forename.

He produced approximately 252 engravings, 18 etchings and 1500 woodcuts, including woodcut book illustrations. He worked extensively on tiny, highly detailed, engravings, many as small as postage stamps, placing him in the German printmaking school known as the "Little Masters" from the size of their prints. Those works were printed and published by him, and his much larger woodcuts were mostly commissioned work. The engravings found a ready market among German bourgeois collectors. He also made prints for use as playing cards and wallpaper.

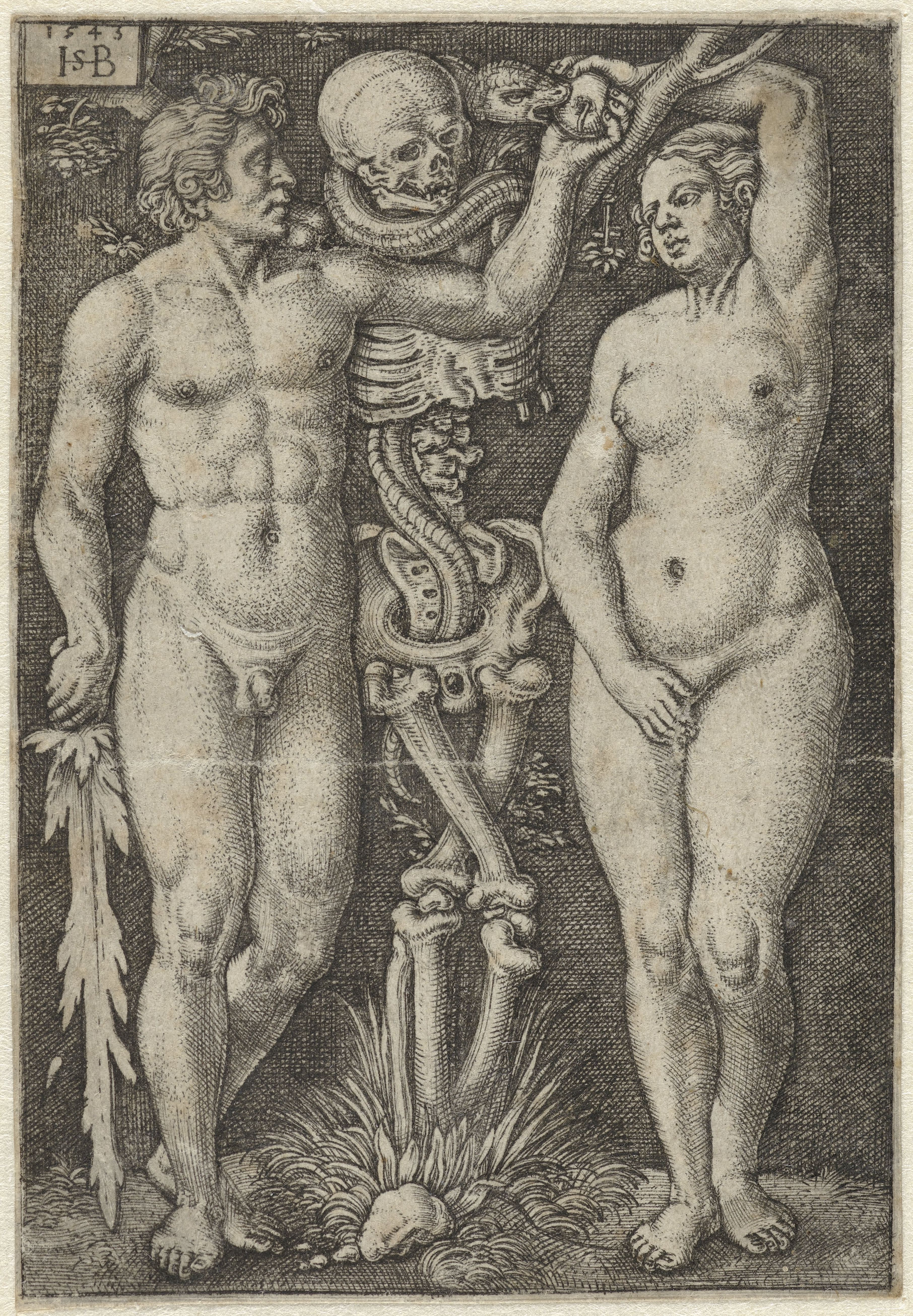
Adam and Eve, 1543, 82 × 56 mm

His engravings cover a range of subjects, but he is especially known for scenes of peasant life and scenes from classical myth or history, both of which often had an erotic element. His early work was done under the shadow of Dürer, who was still working in Nuremberg, and one early woodcut "Head of Christ", to which the "AD" monogram was added in the second state (though probably not by Beham), was long misattributed to Dürer by Adam Bartsch and others. He also borrowed from his brother Barthel's rather more original works. In his later work he boldly re-interpreted many of Dürer's most famous prints in works such as his Melancholia of 1539, exploiting the difference in scale between his work and the original. His dark backgrounds may have been inspired by Italian Niello prints.

== Life ==
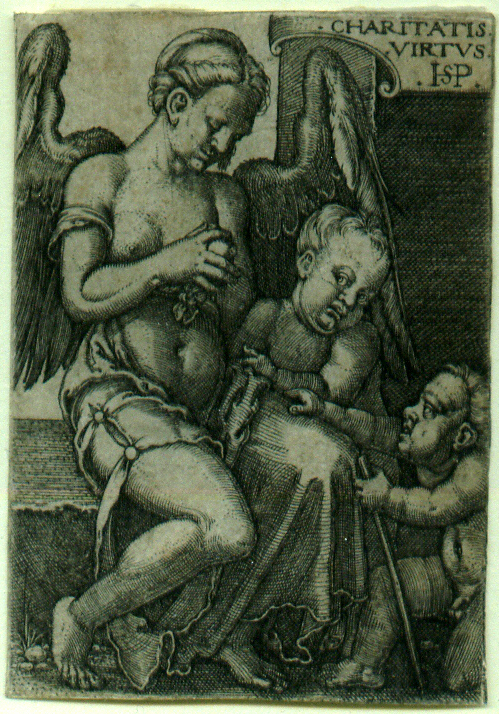
Charitatis virtus, undated but with the early monogram 'HSP'

Beham was born in Nuremberg. Nothing is known of his parents. His brother Bartel Beham, two years his junior, was also an artist. His training is undocumented. In 1521 he is recorded as a Malergeselle ("journeyman painter"), and by 1525 he was master of his own workshop in Nuremberg.

In January 1525, along with his brother and Georg Pencz, he was banished from Nuremberg, accused of heresy, blasphemy and not recognising the authority of the City council. The three thus became known as "godless painters". The accusations against Beham were connected with his Lutheran beliefs, the city authorities then being Catholic, although they adopted Lutheranism as the city's official religion only two months later. The three artists were soon allowed to return to Nuremberg, but in 1528 Beham hurriedly left the city once more, following the threat of legal action over his treatise on the proportions of the horse which was regarded as having been plagiarised from an unpublished manuscript by Albrecht Dürer, who had recently died. He then spent time working in various German cities; his woodcuts were published at Ingolstadt between 1527 and 1530, and in the latter year he was in Munich, where he recorded the triumphal entry of Emperor Charles V in a woodcut entitled The Military Display, 10 June 1530. He lived mostly in Frankfurt from 1532, becoming a citizen there in 1540, and remaining until his death ten years later.

Until about 1532 his prints were monogrammed 'HSP', reflecting the Nuremberg pronunciation of his surname: Peham. After this date, by which time he had established himself in Frankfurt, his monogram became "HSB". This monogram has often led to his name being given as "Hans Sebald Beham", but there is no documentary evidence for this additional forename, the "H" in the monogram probably representing the second syllable of his surname.

He is known to have married twice. A pair of models for medals, designed by Matthes Gebel and dating from 1540, shows Beham and his wife Anna. In 1549, by then a widower, Beham married Elizabeth Wolf, the daughter of a shoemaker from Büdingen.

He is not to be confused with his contemporary Hans Beham (or Behem or Böhm), also of Nuremberg, who cast the "Sigismund" bell (Zygmunt) at the Wawel Castle in Poland for the Sigismund I the Old.

== Other work ==
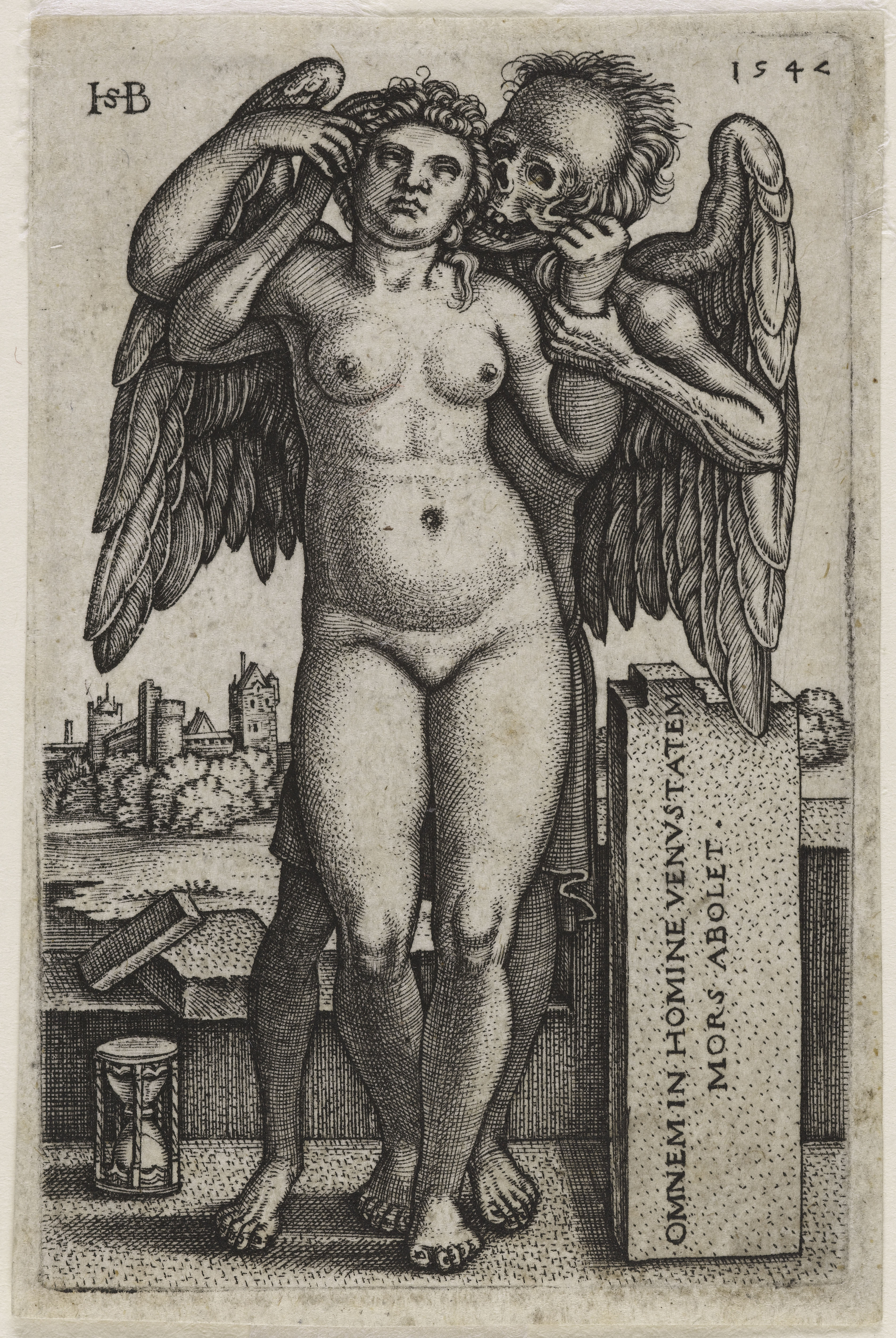
Death and the Standing Nude, 1547, 75 × 48 mm

Beham is best known as a prolific printmaker, but also painted, designed stained glass, and wrote two successful illustrated books, manuals for artists.

=== Paintings ===
He is known to have designed stained glass in Nuremberg. His only known panel painting, however, is a tabletop painted with scenes from the life of King David, now in the Louvre. This was done following his move to Frankfurt, for Cardinal Albrecht of Brandenburg. He also painted miniatures for a prayer-book for Albrecht, now in the collection of the Hofbibliothek, Aschaffenburg. Some coats of arms, painted on vellum for newly ennobled patrons, survive in the city archives in Frankfurt.

=== Artists' manuals ===
The book on the proportions of the horse, for which he was briefly exiled in 1528 following accusations of plagiarism, was an artists' manual, which he later followed with one on the human figure. These publications were simplified borrowings of Dürer's works on the subjects, but rather easier to use (and cheaper), and thus had a long-lasting success.

== Gallery ==
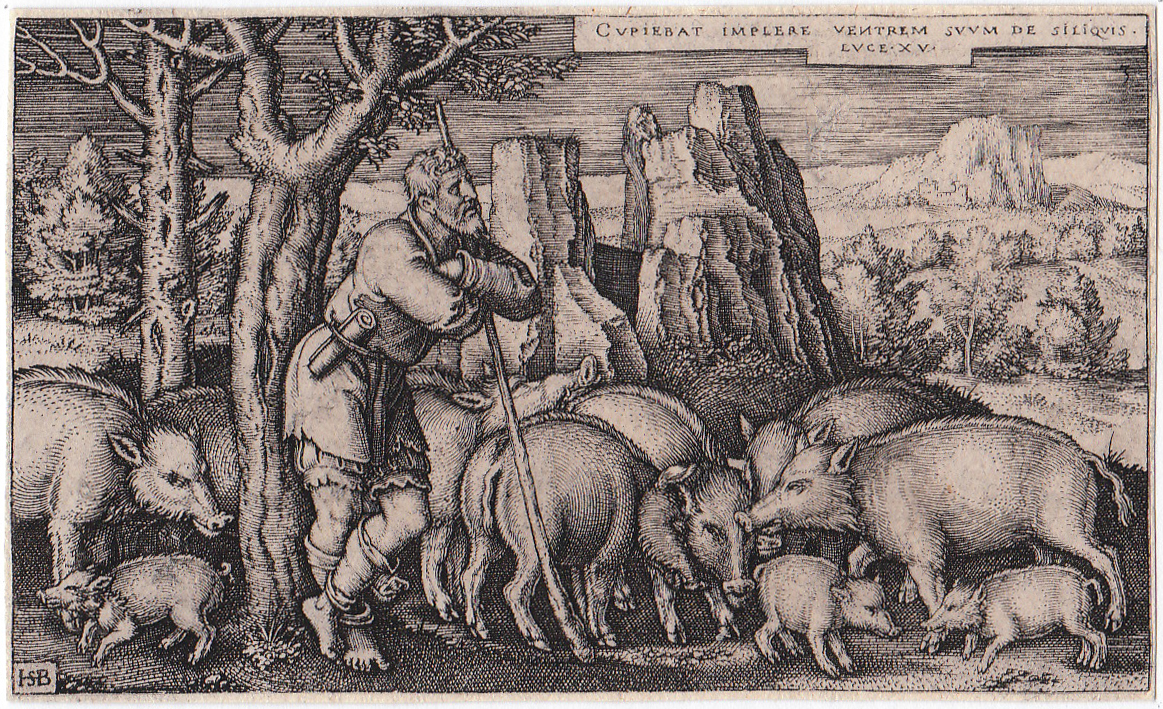
One of a set on the Prodigal Son, 1538

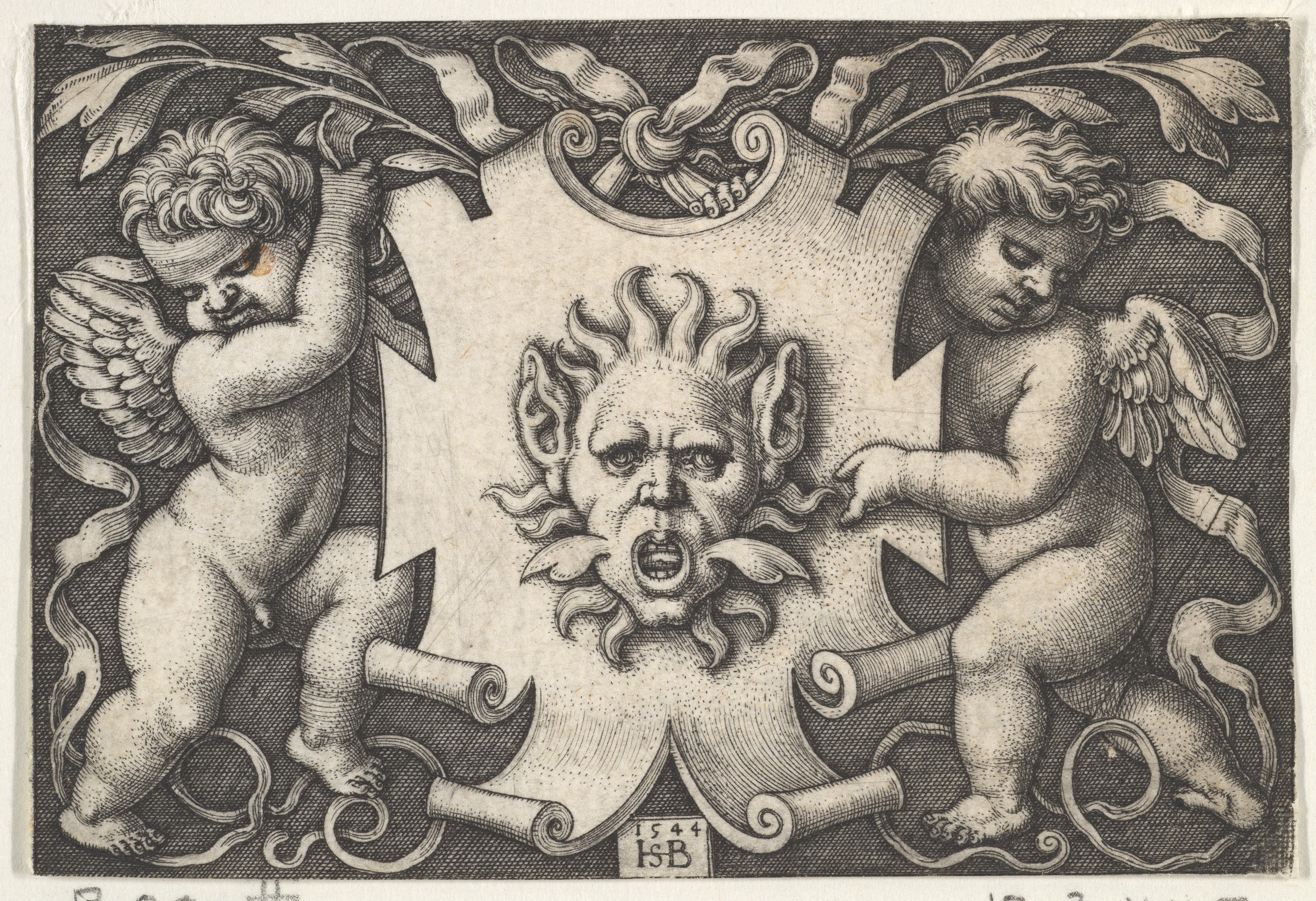
A Mask on an Escutcheon Supported by Two Genii, 1544

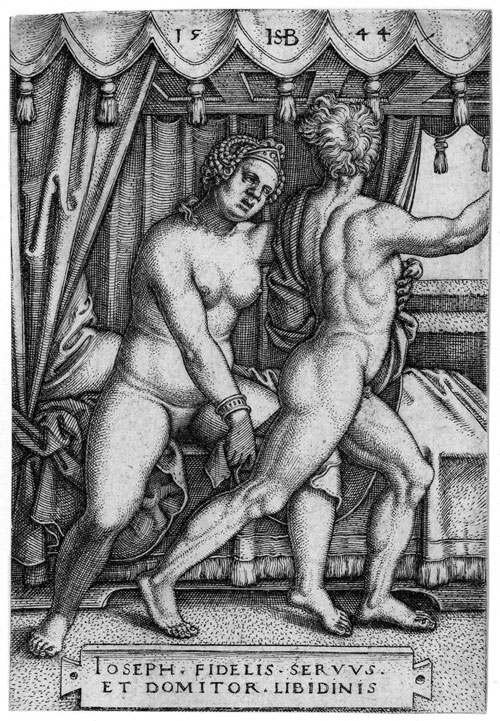
Joseph and Potiphar's Wife, 1544, 81 × 56 mm

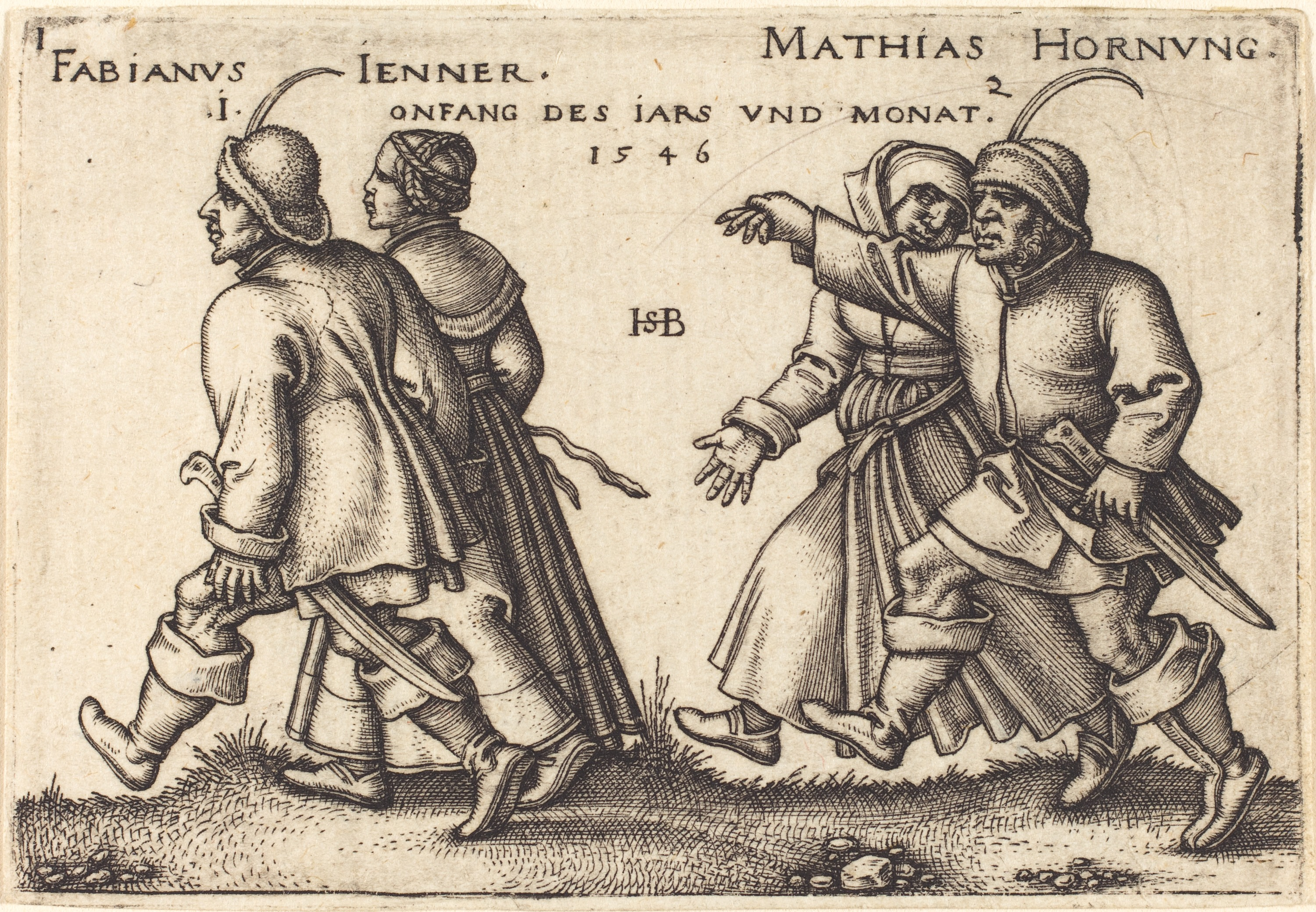
Peasant couples representing the months, from a set, 1545

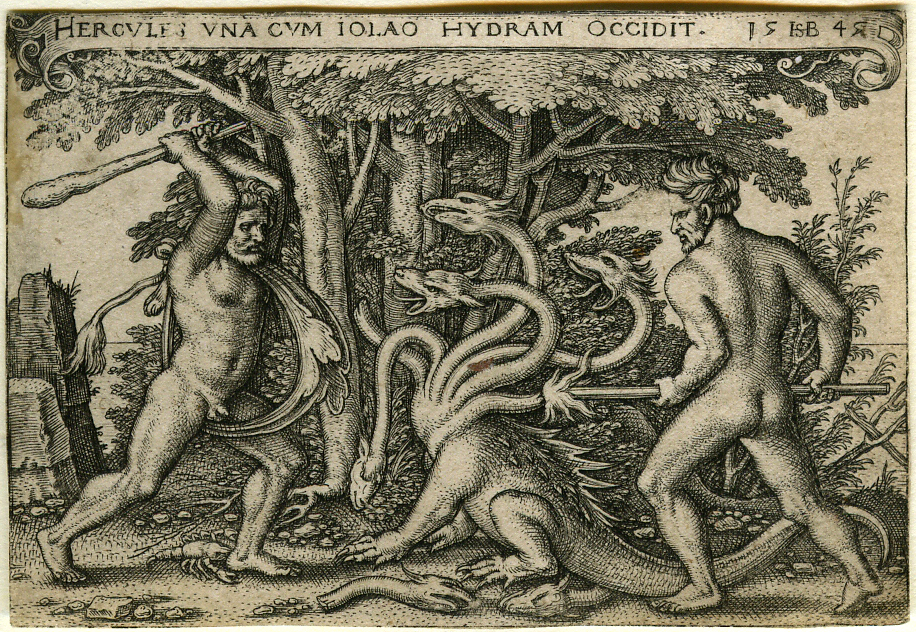
Hercules and Iolaus slaying the Hydra, 1545

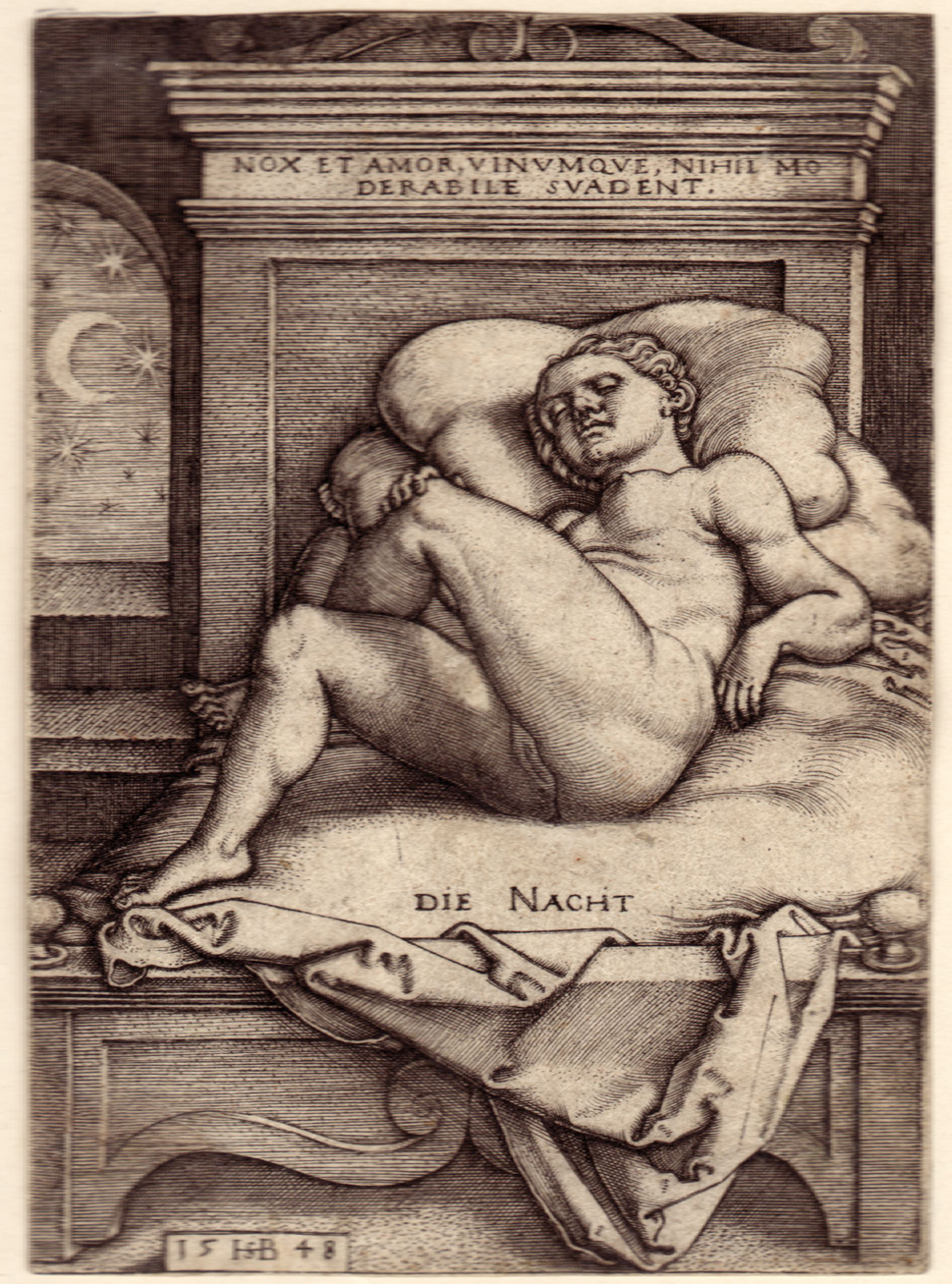
Night, 1548

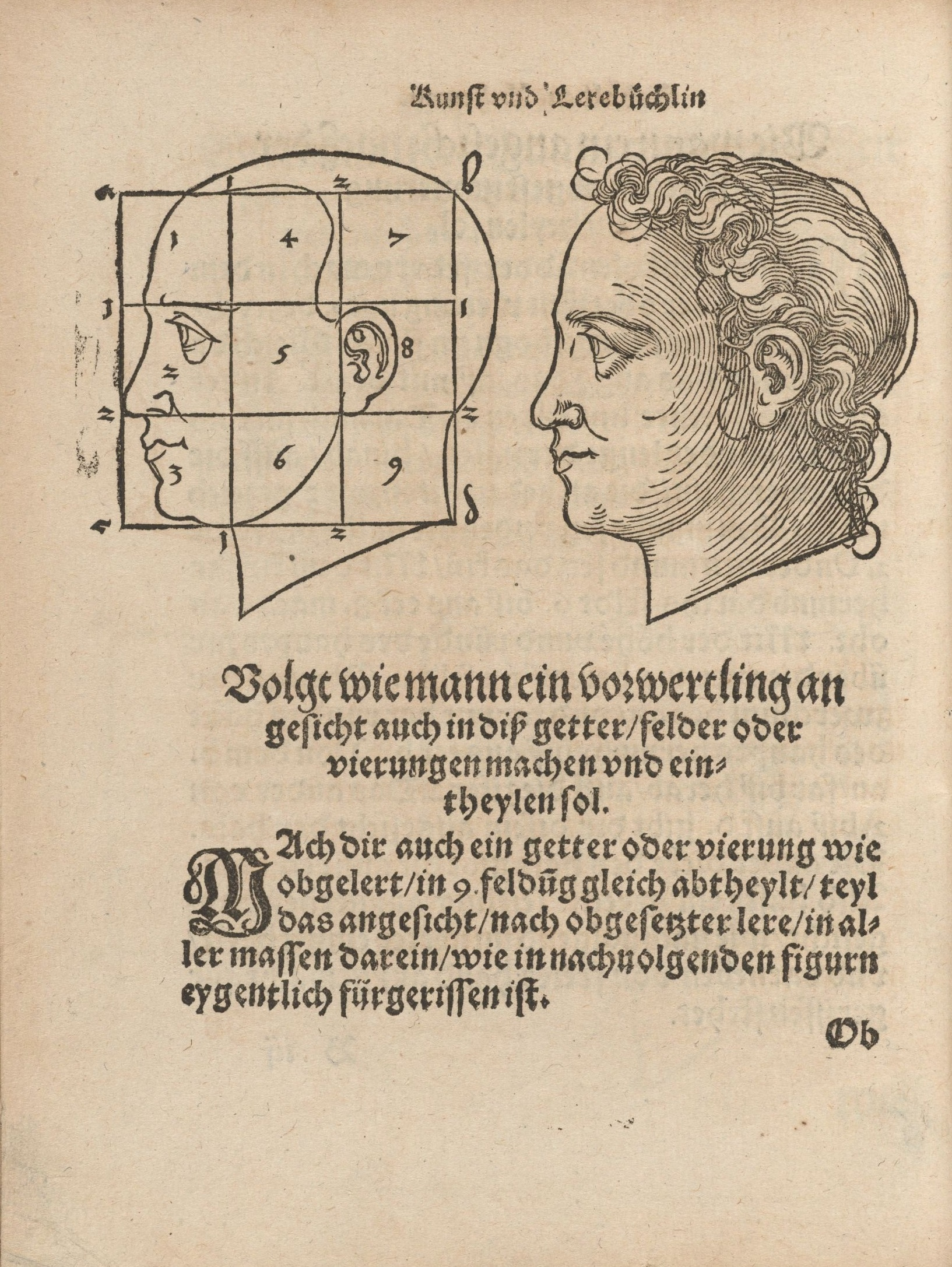
Illustration from Das Kunst vnd Lere Büchlin, 1567

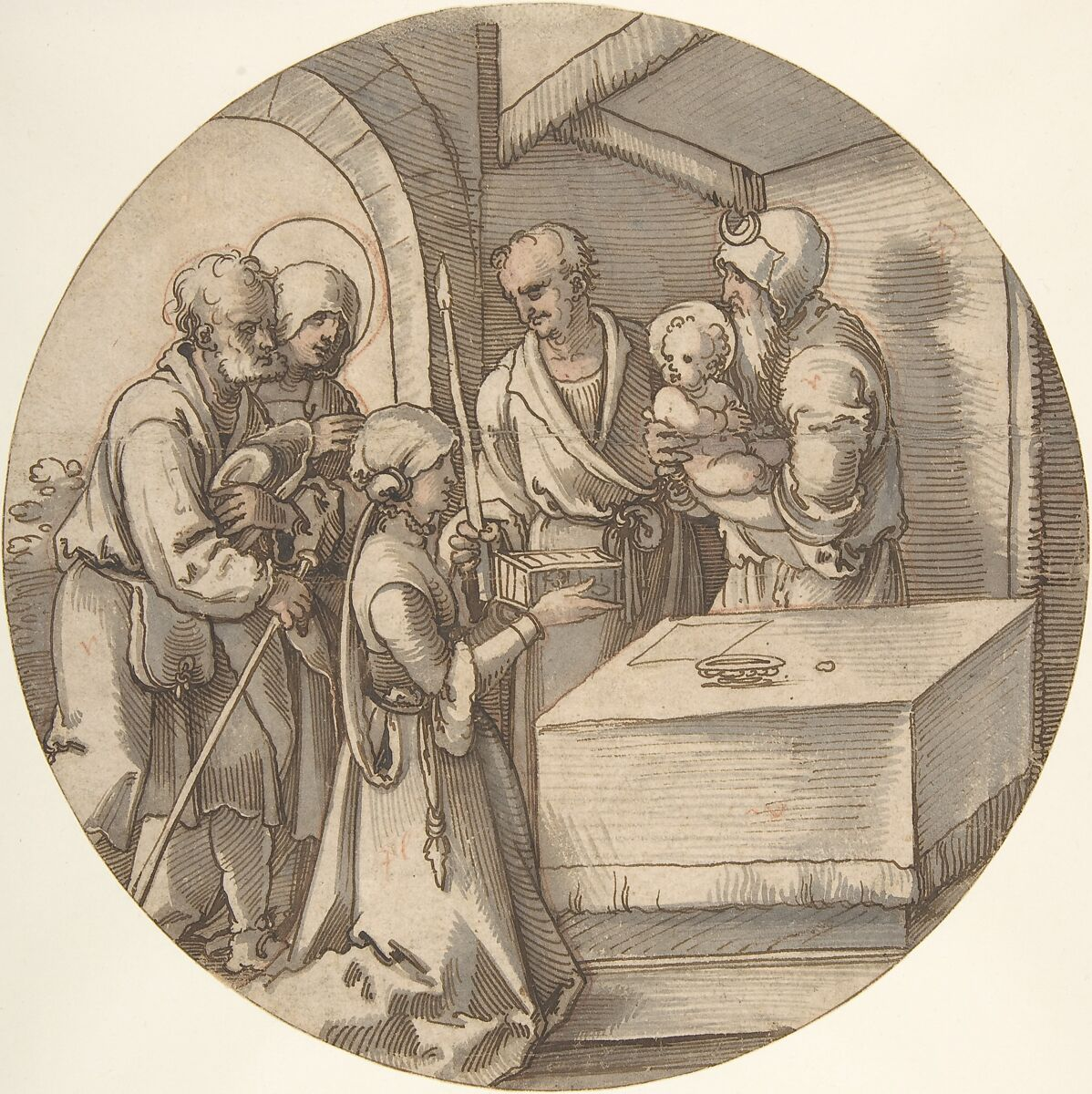
The Presentation of the Infant Jesus in the Temple. The Met.

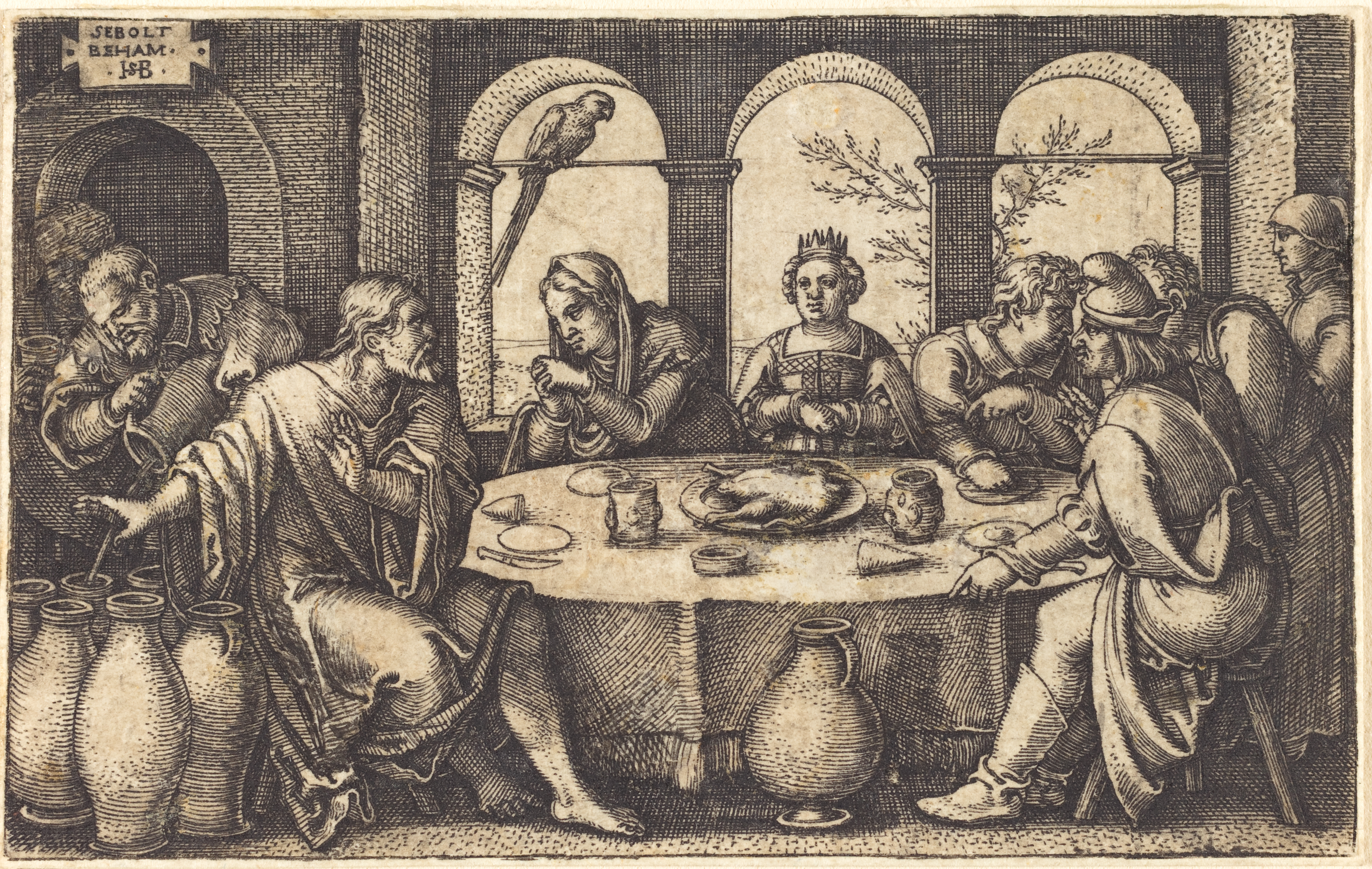
The Marriage at Cana

== See also ==
- Barthel Beham
