= List of people from Tbilisi =

This is a list of famous people who have lived in Tbilisi, including both natives and residents. Some figures in the list may be included in several of the categories simultaneously, but are only included in the sections which pertain to their achievements or occupations the most.

- Irakli Bagration-Mukhraneli (1909—1977), Georgian prince, exiled to Spain
- Tsotne Bakuria (born 1971), legislature member of Autonomous Republic of Adjara, Georgia
- Kakha Bendukidze (1956—2014), Georgian businessman
- Lavrenti Beria (1899—1953), head of the NKVD (the predecessor to the KGB), supervisor and one of the initiators of the Soviet Union's Nuclear Project
- Giga Bokeria (born 1972), Georgian political leader
- Ilia Chavchavadze (1837—1907), writer, politician, public benefactor
- Gela Charkviani (1939—2021), politician, current Ambassador of Georgia in the UK
- Kakutsa Cholokashvili (1888—1930), national hero of Georgia
- Zviad Gamsakhurdia (1939—1993), former president of Georgia
- Alexander Griboedov (1795—1829), diplomat, playwright, composer
- Tedo Isakadze (born 1966), politician and business founder
- Vyacheslav Ivankov (1940—2009), Russian mafia boss and thief in law
- Merab Kostava (1939—1989), national hero and anti-Soviet activist
- Zurab Pololikashvili (born 1977), 6th Secretary-General of the World Tourism Organization
- Mikheil Saakashvili (born 1967), former president of Georgia
- Eduard Shevardnadze (1928—2014), former president of Georgia and Minister of Foreign Affairs of the Soviet Union
- Joseph Stalin (1878—1953), leader of the Soviet Union
- Ekvtime Takaishvili (1862—1953), politician and public benefactor
- Giorgi Targamadze (born 1973), Georgia politician
- Aslan Usoyan (1937—2013), Georgian mobster, Russian mafia boss and thief in law
- Noe Zhordania (1868—1953), Prime Minister of independent Georgia in 1918-1921
- Zurab Zhvania (1963—2005), former prime minister of Georgia

== Writers ==
- Boris Akunin (born 1956), writer
- Hovaness Toumanian (1869—1923), poet and writer
- Nikoloz Baratashvili (1817—1845), poet and writer
- Konstantine Gamsakhurdia (1893—1975), one of the most influential Georgian writers of the 20th century
- Mirza Fatali Akhundov (1812—1878), writer
- Hakob Melik-Hakobyan (Raffi) (1835—1888), writer
- Ryurik Ivnev (1891—1981), poet
- Dagny Juel (1867—1901), writer
- Nar-Dos (1867—1933), Armenian writer
- Zurab Samadashvili (1955—2021), writer and playwright
- Akaki Tsereteli (1840—1915), writer
- Lesya Ukrainka (1871—1913), Ukrainian poet
- Friedrich Martin von Bodenstedt (1819—1892), writer
- Irina Yanovskaya, journalist and human rights activist
- Chabua Amirejibi (1921—2013), writer

== Scientists, engineers, designers and inventors ==
- Malkhaz Abdushelishvili (1926—1998), scientist (anthropologist)
- Andria Apakidze (1914—2005), scientist (archaeologist)
- Viktor Amazaspovich Ambartsumian (1908—1996), astronomer
- Georgy Mikhailovich Beriev (1903—1979), aircraft designer, founder of the Beriev Design Bureau
- Felix d'Herelle (1873—1949), French-Canadian microbiologist, one of the discoverers of bacteriophages
- Revaz Dogonadze (1931—1985), physicist
- Tamaz Gamkrelidze (1929—2021), linguist
- Joseph Jordania (born 1954), ethnomusicologist, evolutionary musicologist
- Alexander Kartveli (Kartvelishvili) (1896—1974), aircraft engineer
- Gustav Radde (1831—1903), scientist
- Alexander de Seversky (1894—1974), aircraft engineer
- Otto Wilhelm Hermann von Abich (1806—1886), mineralogist and geologist
- Armais Arutunoff (1893-1978), inventor of electric submersible pump popular in oil industry

== Musicians, singers and composers ==
- Robert Bardzimashvili (1934—2003), singer, founder of Orera, Via-75
- Lisa Batiashvili (born 1979), violinist
- Rashid Behbudov (1915—1989), singer
- Paata Burchuladze (born 1955), operatic bass, civil activist and politician
- Feodor Chaliapin (1873—1938), opera singer
- Irakli Charkviani (1961—2006), Georgian poet and rock/pop singer
- Niaz Diasamidze (born 1973), Georgian composer and folk rock singer, founder of the band 33a
- Givi Gachechiladze (born 1938), composer, conductor, Tbilisi State Orchestra "Rero", The Mardzhanishvili Theater Orchestra, Tbilisi Municipal Concert Orchestra
- Hamlet Gonashvili (1928—1985), tenor
- Stella Grigorian (born 1968), opera singer
- Alexander Melik-Pashayev (1905—1964), Soviet conductor
- Niyazi Hajibeyov (1912—1984), conductor, composer
- İdris Ağalarov (1917-1975), opera singer
- Mikhail Ippolitov-Ivanov (1859—1935), composer
- Giya Kancheli (1935—2019), composer
- Rudolf Kehrer (1923—2013), pianist
- Aram Khachaturian (1903—1978), composer
- Srbui Lisitsian (1893—1979), Armenian-Soviet folk dance ethnographer
- Zakharia Paliashvili (1871—1933), composer, founder of Georgian classical music
- Anita Rachvelishvili (born 1984), Georgian mezzo-soprano
- Sayat-Nova (1712—1795), ashugh
- Irma Sokhadze (born 1955), singer, pianist, composer and TV presenter
- Tsisana Tatishvili (1939—2017), opera singer
- Anoushavan Ter-Ghevondyan (1887—1961, Armenian composer, pedagogue, and sociocultural activist
- Alexander Toradze (1952—2022), pianist
- Lev Vlassenko (1928—1996), pianist
- Elena Dzamashvili (1942—2020), pianist
- Nicolas Namoradze (born 1992), pianist and composer

== Theatre, cinema, arts and entertainment ==
- Tengiz Abuladze (1924—1994), film director
- Elene Akhvlediani (1898—1975), painter
- Nino Ananiashvili (born 1963), ballerina
- Gela Babluani (born 1979), film director; directed the acclaimed film 13 Tzameti
- Temur Babluani (born 1948), film director
- Ramaz Chkhikvadze (1928—2011), theatre, cinema artist
- Georgi Daneliya (1930—2019), film director
- Haykanoush Danielyan (1893—1958), opera singer
- Lado Gudiashvili (1896—1980), painter
- Otar Ioseliani (born 1934), film director
- Jadvyga Jovaišaitė (1903–2000), ballet dancer
- Gayane Khachaturian (1942—2009), Georgian-Armenian painter
- Vakhtang Kikabidze (1938—2023), actor
- Yervand Kochar (1899—1979), Armenian painter
- Robert Kondakhsazov (1937—2010), Georgian-born artist, writer and philosopher
- Arpenik Nalbandyan (1916—1964), Armenian painter
- Dmitry Nalbandyan (1906—1993), Armenian painter
- Sergei Parajanov (1924—1990), producer
- Elena Satine (born 1989), actor, singer
- Robert Sturua (born 1938), director
- Natela Tchkonia (born 1961), opera singer
- Georgy Tovstonogov (1915—1989), Russian theatre director
- Avksenty Tsagareli (1857—1902), playwright
- Zurab Tsereteli (born 1934), artist, architect
- Marie Vorobieff (1892—1984), painter
- Ruben Zakharian (1901—1992), Armenian painter

== Sports figures ==
- Shota Arveladze (born 1973), soccer player
- Maia Chiburdanidze (born 1973), former women's world chess champion
- Vitali Daraselia (1957—1982), former football (soccer) player for Dinamo Tbilisi and the Soviet Union National Team
- Merab Dvalishvili (born 1991), mixed martial-artist in the UFC and former holder of the UFC Bantamweight Championship
- Roman Dzindzichashvili (born 1944), chess grandmaster
- Teymuraz Gabashvili (born 1985), tennis player
- Nona Gaprindashvili (born 1941), former women's world chess champion
- Elene Gedevanishvili (born 1990), figure skater
- Kakha Kaladze (born 1978), football (soccer) player for AC Milan and the Georgia national football team
- Giorgi Kinkladze (born 1973), former football (soccer) player for Dinamo Tbilisi, Manchester City and the Georgia national football team
- David Kipiani (1951—2001), former football (soccer) player for Dinamo Tbilisi and the Soviet Union National Team
- Khvicha Kvaratskhelia (born 2001), football (soccer) player for PSG and the Georgia national football team
- Zaza Pachulia (born 1984), NBA player
- Tigran Petrosian (1929—1984), former world chess champion
- Murtaz Shelia (born 1969), former football player for Dinamo Tbilisi and Manchester City
- Zurab Zviadauri (born 1981), judoka
- Ilias Iliadis (born 1986), judoka
- Tornike Shengelia (born 1991), basketball player

== Military figures ==
- Konstantine "Kote" Abkhazi (1867—1923), general
- Timur Apakidze (1954—2001), general
- Pavel Bermondt–Avalov (1877–1973), major general and warlord
- Aleksei Brusilov (1853—1926), Russian cavalry general
- Anatoli Gekker (1888—1937), Soviet commander
- Giorgi Kvinitadze (1874—1970), founder of the Tbilisi Junker school
- Mikhail Tarielovich Loris-Melikov (1824—1888), general
- Giorgi Mazniashvili (1870—1937), general
- Ivan Abamelik - (1768—1828), general

== Other ==
- Mikael Aramyants (1843—1923), businessman and philanthropist
- Zurab Avalishvili (1876—1944), historian
- Arnold Chikobava (1898—1985), linguist
- Jeanne de Salzmann (1889—1990), mystic
- Pavel Florensky (1882—1937), philosopher, theologian
- Irene Galitzine (1916—2006), fashion designer
- Ivane Javakhishvili (1876—1940), historian, public benefactor
- George Maisuradze (born 1970), professor
- Alexander Mantashev (1842—1911), prominent Armenian oil magnate, industrialist, financier, and philanthropist
- Tako Natsvlishvili (born 1998), fashion model
- Tamar Tumanyan (1907–1989), Soviet Armenian architect

== Honorary citizens ==
People awarded the honorary citizenship of Tbilisi are:

Date	Name	Notes
1983	Avlipi Zurabashvili	Georgian psychiatrist and neuromorphologist
1987	Tina Asatiani	Armenian physicist of Georgian origin
27 September 2017	Johannes Hahn	Austrian politician and European Commissioner for Enlargement and European Neighbourhood Policy
15 September 2018	Mikhail Baryshnikov	Soviet ballet dancer
10 March 2022	Elizabeth Sombart	French Classical Pianist

== See also ==
- al-Tiflisi

== Bibliography ==
- თბილისის საპატიო მოქალაქეები.
- თბილისის საპატიო მოქალაქეები. ქალაქ თბილისის მუნიციპალიტეტის მერია/ TBILISI CITY HALL.
