= The Battle of Alexander at Issus =

Painting by Albrecht Altdorfer

- Artist: Albrecht Altdorfer
- Year: 1529
- Medium: oil painting on panel
- Dimensions: 158.4 cm × 120.3 cm (62.4 in × 47.4 in)
- Location: Alte Pinakothek, Munich

The Battle of Alexander at Issus (German: Alexanderschlacht) is a 1529 oil painting by the German artist Albrecht Altdorfer (c. 1480–1538), a pioneer of landscape art and a founding member of the Danube school. The painting portrays the 333 BC Battle of Issus, in which Alexander the Great secured a decisive victory over Darius III of Persia and gained crucial leverage in his campaign against the Persian Empire. The painting is widely regarded as Altdorfer's masterpiece, and is one of the most famous examples of the type of Renaissance landscape painting known as the world landscape, which here reaches an unprecedented grandeur.

Duke William IV of Bavaria commissioned The Battle of Alexander at Issus in 1528 as part of a set of historical pieces that was to hang in his Munich residence. Modern commentators suggest that the painting, through its abundant use of anachronism, was intended to liken Alexander's heroic victory at Issus to the contemporary European conflict with the Ottoman Empire. In particular, the defeat of Suleiman the Magnificent at the siege of Vienna may have been an inspiration for Altdorfer. A religious undercurrent is detectable, especially in the extraordinary sky; this was probably inspired by the prophecies of Daniel and contemporary concern within the Church about an impending apocalypse. The Battle of Alexander at Issus and four others that were part of William's initial set are in the Alte Pinakothek art museum in Munich.

== Subject matter ==
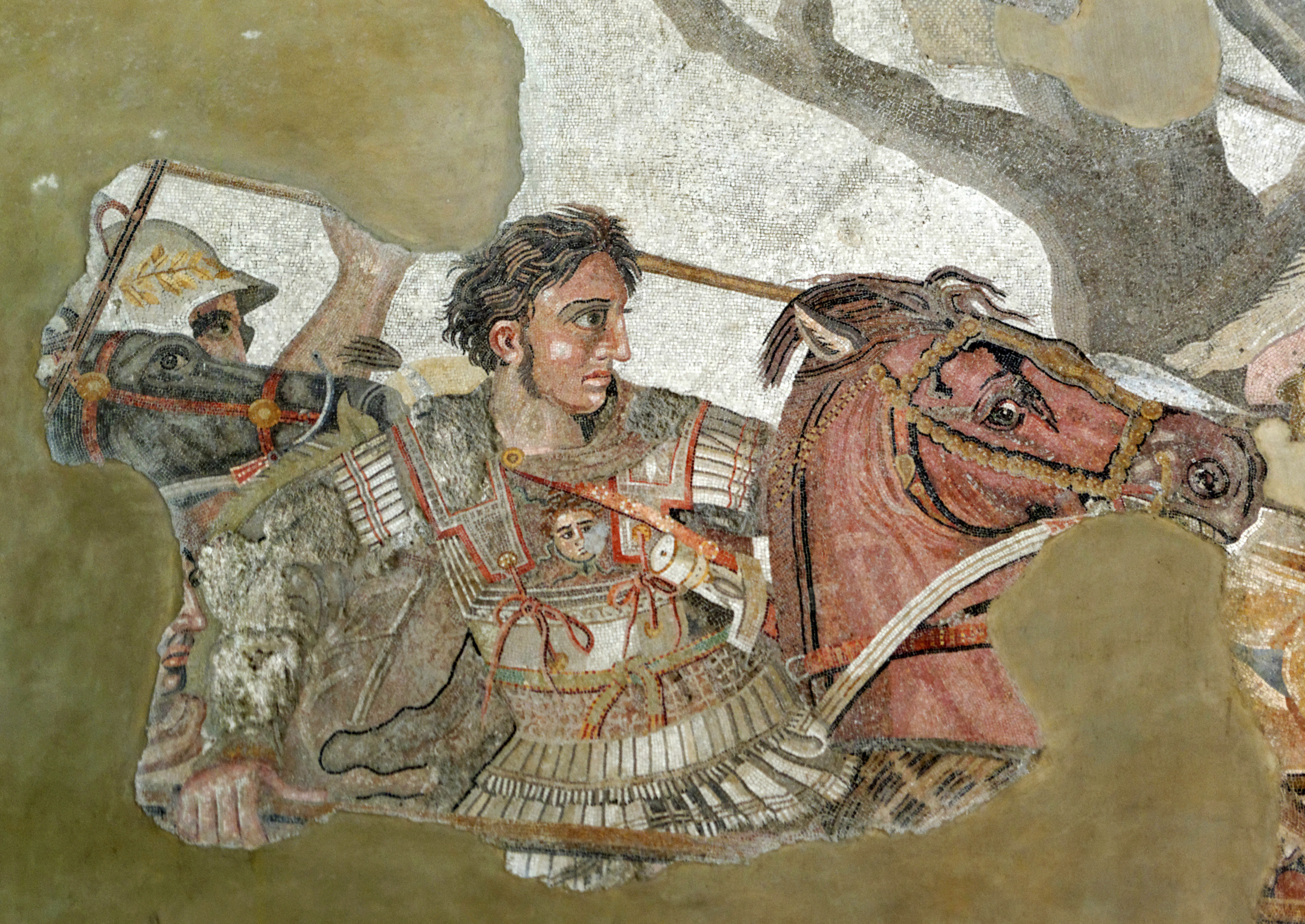
Detail of Alexander the Great from the Alexander Mosaic c. 100 BC

Alexander III of Macedon (356–323 BC), best known as Alexander the Great, was an Ancient King of Macedon who reigned from 336 BC until his death. He is widely regarded as one of the greatest military tacticians and strategists in history, and is presumed undefeated in battle. Renowned for his military leadership and charisma, he always led his armies personally and took to the front ranks of battle. By conquering the Persian Empire and unifying Greece, Egypt and Babylon, he forged the largest empire of the ancient world and effected the spread of Hellenism throughout Europe and Northern Africa.

Alexander embarked on his expedition to conquer the Persian Empire in the spring of 334 BC, having pacified the warring Greek states and consolidated his military might. During the first months of the Macedonian passage into Persian Asia Minor, Darius III – king of Persia – largely ignored the presence of Alexander's 40,000 men. The Battle of the Granicus, fought in May, was Persia's first major effort to confront the invaders, but resulted in an easy victory for Alexander. Over the next year, Alexander took most of western and coastal Asia Minor by forcing the capitulation of the satrapies in his path. He continued inland, travelling northeast through Phrygia before turning southeast toward Cilicia. After passing the Cilician Gates in October, Alexander was delayed by fever in Tarsus. Darius, meanwhile, mustered an army of up to 100,000 (some ancient sources posit exaggerated figures of over 600,000) and personally directed it over the eastern slopes of the Amanus Mountains. In early November, as Alexander proceeded about the Gulf of Issus from Mallus via Issus, the two armies inadvertently passed one another on opposite sides of the mountains. This was decidedly to Darius' advantage: now at the rear of Alexander, he was able to prevent retreat and block the supply lines Alexander had established at Issus. It was not until Alexander had encamped at Myriandrus, a seaport on the southeastern shores of the Gulf of İskenderun, that he learned of the Persian position. He immediately retraced his route to the Pinarus River, just south of Issus, to find Darius' force assembled along the northern bank. The Battle of Issus ensued.

The initial dispositions at the Battle of Issus. The Pinarus River separates the belligerents, and Issus is 7 miles (11 km) to the north. Cavalry is concentrated on the shores of the Gulf of İskenderun (or Gulf of Issus) on both sides. Alexander devotes himself to a right approach with his Companion cavalry, having unseated the Persian foothill defence.

Darius' initial response was defensive: he immediately stockaded the river bank with stakes to impede the enemy's crossing. A core vanguard of traitorous Greek mercenaries and Persian royal guard was established; as was usual for Persian kings, Darius positioned himself in the centre of this vanguard, in order that he might effectively dispatch commands to any part of his large army. A group of Persian light infantry was soon sent to the foothills, as it was suspected that Alexander would make an approach from the right, away from the coast. A mass of cavalry commanded by Nabarsanes occupied the Persian right.

Alexander made a cautious and slow advance, intending to base his strategy on the structure of the Persian force. He led a flank of his Companion cavalry on the right, while the Thessalian cavalry were dispatched to the left, as a counter to Nabarsanes' mounted unit. Aware of the importance of the foothills to his right, Alexander sent a band of light infantry, archers, and cavalry to displace the defence Darius had stationed there. The enterprise was successful – those Persians not killed were forced to seek refuge higher in the mountains.

When within missile range of the enemy, Alexander gave the order to charge. He spearheaded the assault of his heavily armed Companion cavalry, who quickly made deep cuts into the Persian left flank. The Macedonian left wing, commanded by Parmenion, was meanwhile driven back by Nabarsanes' large cavalry. The Macedonians' central phalanx crossed the river and clashed with the renegade Greek mercenaries who fronted Darius' vanguard. As the Companion cavalry pushed further into the Persian left, the danger arose that Darius would exploit the gap that had formed between Alexander and the rest of his army. When he was satisfied that the left wing was crippled and no longer a threat, Alexander remedied the situation by moving the Companions to assault the Persian centre in the flank. Unable to handle the added pressure, the Persian vanguard was forced to withdraw from the river bank, allowing the Macedonian phalanx to continue their advance and lifting the pressure on Parmenion's left wing.

Upon realising that the onslaught of Alexander's Companion cavalry was unstoppable, Darius and his army fled. Many were killed in the rush, trampled by those who fled with them or collapsed with their horses. Some escaped to regions as remote as Egypt, and others reunited with Darius in the north. The onset of darkness ended the chase after approximately 20 km (12 mi); Alexander then recalled his army and set about burying the dead. Darius' family were left behind in the Persian camp; it is reported that Alexander treated them well and reassured them of Darius' safety. Darius' royal chariot was found discarded in a ditch, as were his bow and shield.

Ancient sources present disparate casualty figures for the Battle of Issus. Plutarch and Diodorus Siculus approximate 100,000 Persian deaths, in contrast with the 450 Macedonian deaths reported by Quintus Curtius Rufus. In any case, it is probable that more Persians were killed as they fled than in battle; Ptolemy I, who served with Alexander during the battle, recounts how the Macedonians crossed a ravine on the bodies of their enemies during the pursuit.

The Macedonian conquest of Persia continued until 330 BC, when Darius was killed and Alexander took his title as king. Alexander died in 323 BC, having recently returned from campaigning in the Indian subcontinent. The cause of death remains a subject of debate.

== Background ==
=== Previous work ===
Saint George in the Forest (1510)

Albrecht Altdorfer is regarded as one of the founders of Western landscape art. He was a painter, etcher, architect, and engraver, and the leader of the Danube school of German art. As evidenced by such paintings as Saint George in the Forest (1510) and Allegory (1531), much of Altdorfer's work is characterised by an attachment to sprawling landscapes that dwarf the figures within them; The Battle of Alexander at Issus epitomises this facet of his style. With reference to Saint George in the Forest in particular, art historian Mark W. Roskill comments that "The accessory material of landscape [in Altdorfer's work] is played with and ornamentally elaborated so that it reverberates with the sense of a sequestered and inhospitable environment". Inspired by his travels around the Austrian Alps and the Danube River, Altdorfer painted a number of landscapes that contain no figures at all, including Landscape with a Footbridge (c. 1516) and Danube Landscape near Regensburg (c. 1522–25). These were the first "pure" landscapes since antiquity. Most of Altdorfer's landscapes were made with a vertical format, in contrast with the modern conception of the genre. The horizontal landscape was an innovation of Altdorfer's Flemish contemporary Joachim Patinir and his followers.

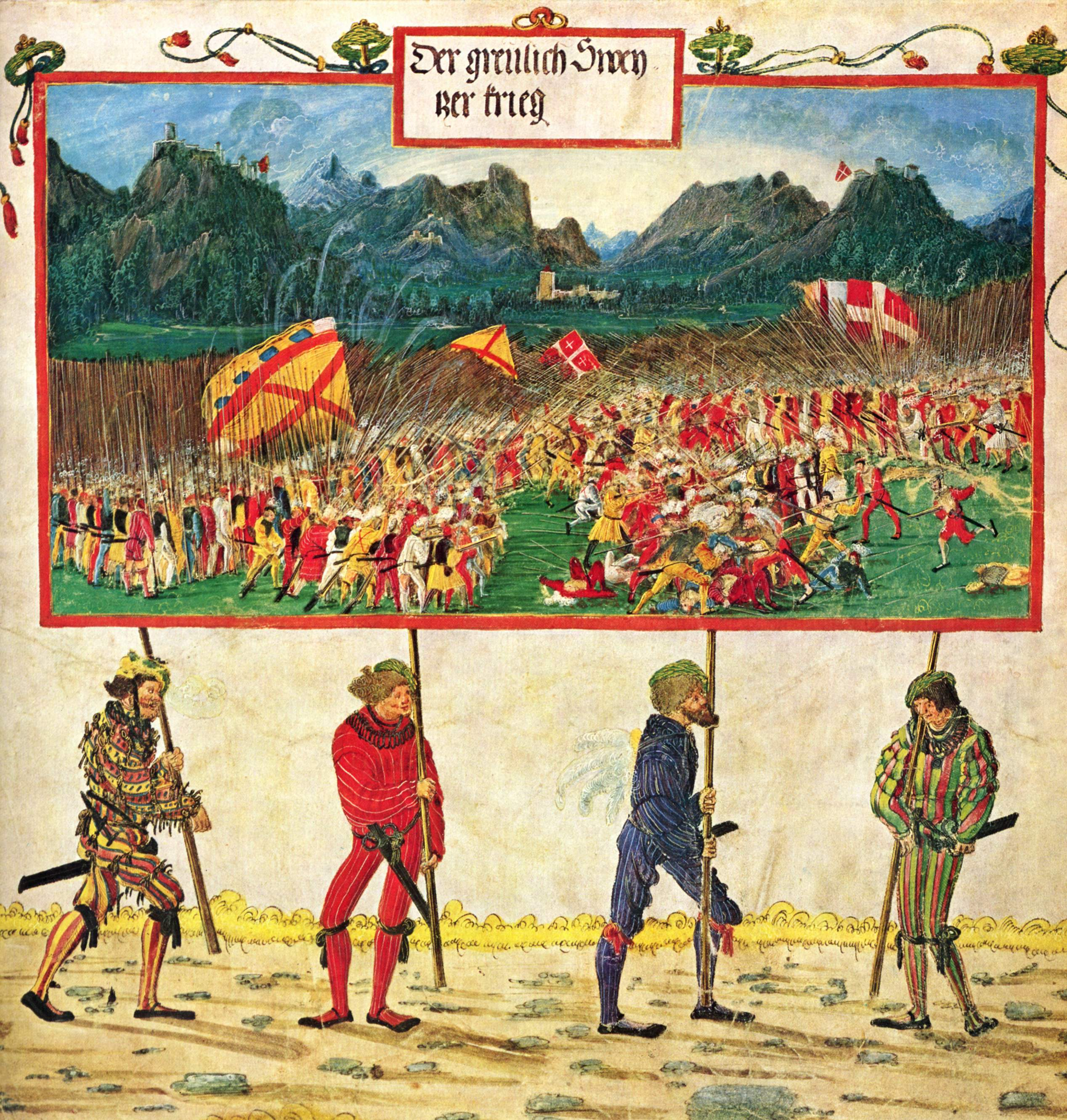
A miniature from Triumphal Procession (1512–1516)

Altdorfer also produced a great deal of religious artwork, in reflection of his devout Catholicism. His most frequent subjects were the Virgin Mary and the life and crucifixion of Christ. As in The Battle of Alexander at Issus, these paintings often feature settings of great majesty and use the sky to convey symbolic meaning. This meaning is not uniform throughout Altdorfer's corpus – for example, the visage of the setting sun connotes loss and tragedy in Agony in the Garden, but serves as "the emblem of power and glory" in The Battle of Alexander at Issus.

Larry Silver of The Art Bulletin explains that The Battle of Alexander at Issus is both similar to and in direct contrast with Altdorfer's previous work: "Instead of the peaceful landscape of retreat for Christian events or holy figures, this panel offers just the opposite: a battleground for one of ancient history's principal epoch-making encounters ... Yet despite its global or cosmic dimensions, the Battle of Issus still looks like Altdorfer's earlier, contemplative liminal landscapes of retreat, complete with craggy peaks, bodies of water, and distant castles."

Although the Battle of Alexander is atypical of Altdorfer in its size and in that it depicts war, his Triumphal Procession – a 1512–16 illuminated manuscript commissioned by Maximilian I of the Holy Roman Empire – has been described as a conceptual antecedent. The Procession was produced in parallel with the Triumph of Maximilian, a series of 137 woodcuts collaboratively executed by Altdorfer, Hans Springinklee, Albrecht Dürer, Leonhard Beck and Hans Schäufelein.

=== Influences and commission ===
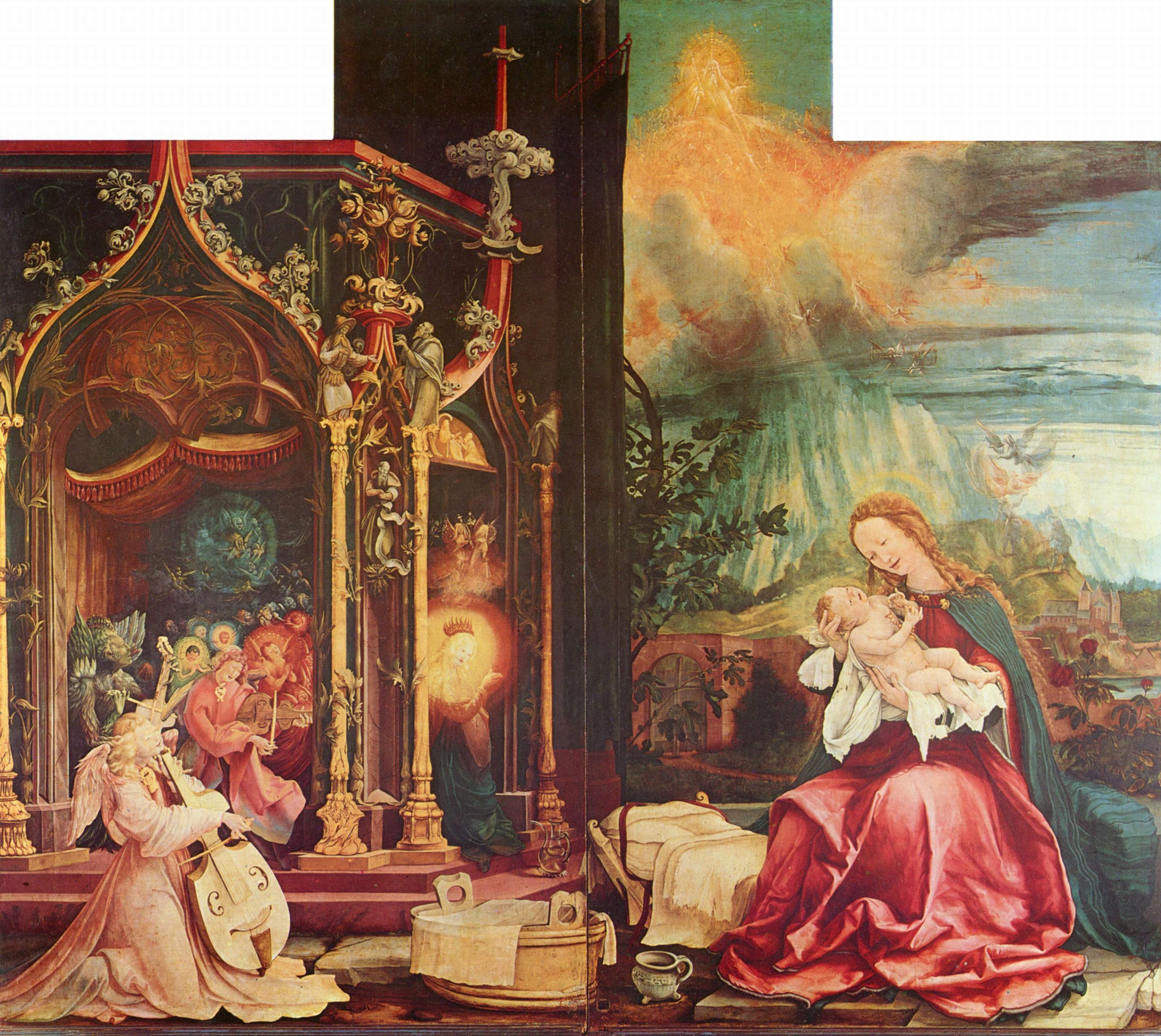
Matthias Grünewald's The Virgin and Child with the Heavenly Host (c. 1515)

Altdorfer's most significant contemporary influence was Matthias Grünewald (c. 1470–1528). Art historian Horst W. Janson remarked that their paintings "show the same 'unruly' imagination". Elements of The Battle of Alexander at Issus – particularly the sky – have been compared to Grünewald's Heavenly Host above the Virgin and Child, which forms part of his masterpiece, the Isenheim Altarpiece. Lucas Cranach the Elder (1472–1553), also associated with the Danube school, was another important influence for Altdorfer. According to Roskill, works by Cranach from about 1500 "give a prominent role to landscape settings, using them as mood-enhancing backgrounds for portraits, and for images of hermits and visionary saints", and seem to play a "preparatory role" for the onset of pure landscape. Altdorfer owed much of his style, particularly in his religious artwork, to Albrecht Dürer (1471–1528); Larry Silver writes that Altdorfer's "use of convincing German landscapes in combination with celestial phenomena for his religious narrative" is "firmly tied" to a tradition "modeled by Albrecht Dürer."

William IV, Duke of Bavaria commissioned The Battle of Alexander at Issus in 1528. Altdorfer was approximately 50 at the time, and was living in the Free Imperial City of Regensburg. As a result of over a decade of involvement with the Regensburg city council, Altdorfer was offered the position of Burgomaster on 18 September 1528. He declined; the council annals reported his reasoning as such: "He much desires to execute a special work in Bavaria for my Serene Highness and gracious Lord, Duke [William]." William probably wanted the painting for his newly built summer Lusthaus ("pleasure house") in the grounds of his palace in Munich, approximately 60 miles (97 km) south of Regensburg. There, it was to hang alongside seven other paintings with a similar format and subject matter, including Ludwig Refinger's The Martyrdom of Marcus Curtius, Melchior Feselen's The Siege of Alesia by Caesar, and the painting of Battle of Cannae by Hans Burgkmair (1473–1531). Another eight, each portraying a famous woman from history, were later added to the set, probably at the behest of the Duke's wife, Jacobaea of Baden. Altdorfer's Susanna and the Elders (1526) was among these.

=== Earlier depictions ===
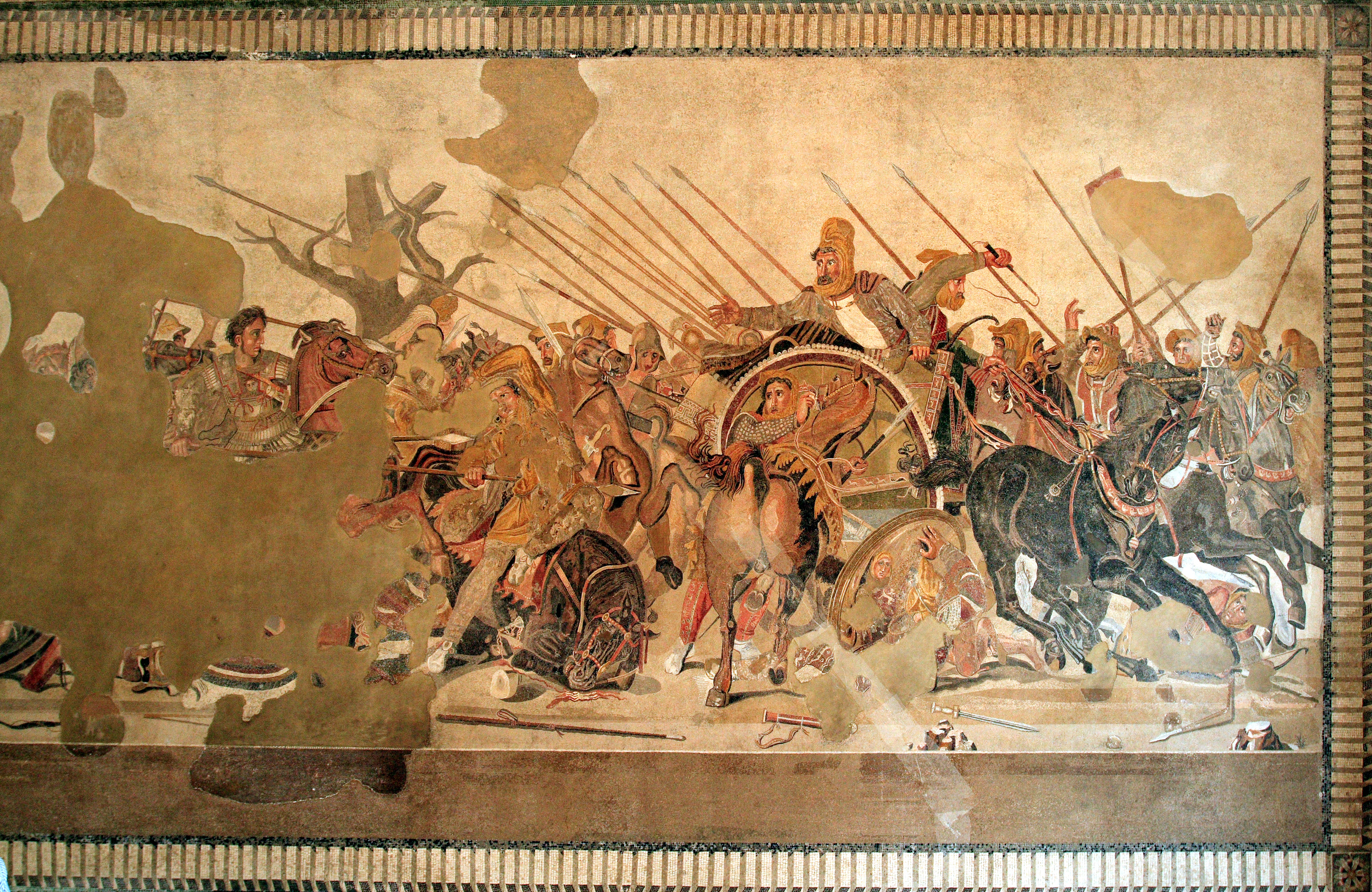
The Alexander Mosaic, as seen in the Naples National Archaeological Museum

Earlier depictions of the Battle of Issus are few. Battle of Issus, a fresco by Philoxenus of Eretria, is probably the first such. It was painted sometime around 310 BC for Cassander (c. 350–297 BC), who was one of Alexander the Great's successors. Alexander and Darius – each within a lance's length of the other – are pictured among a wild fray of mounted and downed soldiers. While Alexander maintains an aura of unshaken confidence, fear is etched in Darius' face, and his charioteer has already turned to rein his horses and escape. Roman author and natural philosopher Pliny the Elder claimed that Philoxenus' portrayal of the battle was "inferior to none". Some modern critics posit that Battle of Issus might not have been the work of Philoxenus, but of Helena of Egypt. One of the few named women painters who might have worked in Ancient Greece, she was reputed to have produced a painting of the battle of Issus which hung in the Temple of Peace during the time of Vespasian.

The Alexander Mosaic, a floor mosaic dating from c. 100 BC, is believed to be a "reasonably faithful" copy of Battle of Issus, though an alternative view holds it might instead be a copy of a work painted by Apelles of Kos, who produced several portraits of Alexander the Great. It measures 5.82 m × 3.13 m (19 ft 1 in × 10 ft 3 in), and consists of approximately 1.5 million tesserae (coloured tiles), each about 3 mm (0.12 in) square. The mosaicist is unknown. Since the mosaic was not rediscovered until 1831, during excavations of Pompeii's House of the Faun, Altdorfer could never have seen it. It was later moved to the Naples National Archaeological Museum in Naples, Italy, where it currently resides.

== Painting ==
=== Description ===
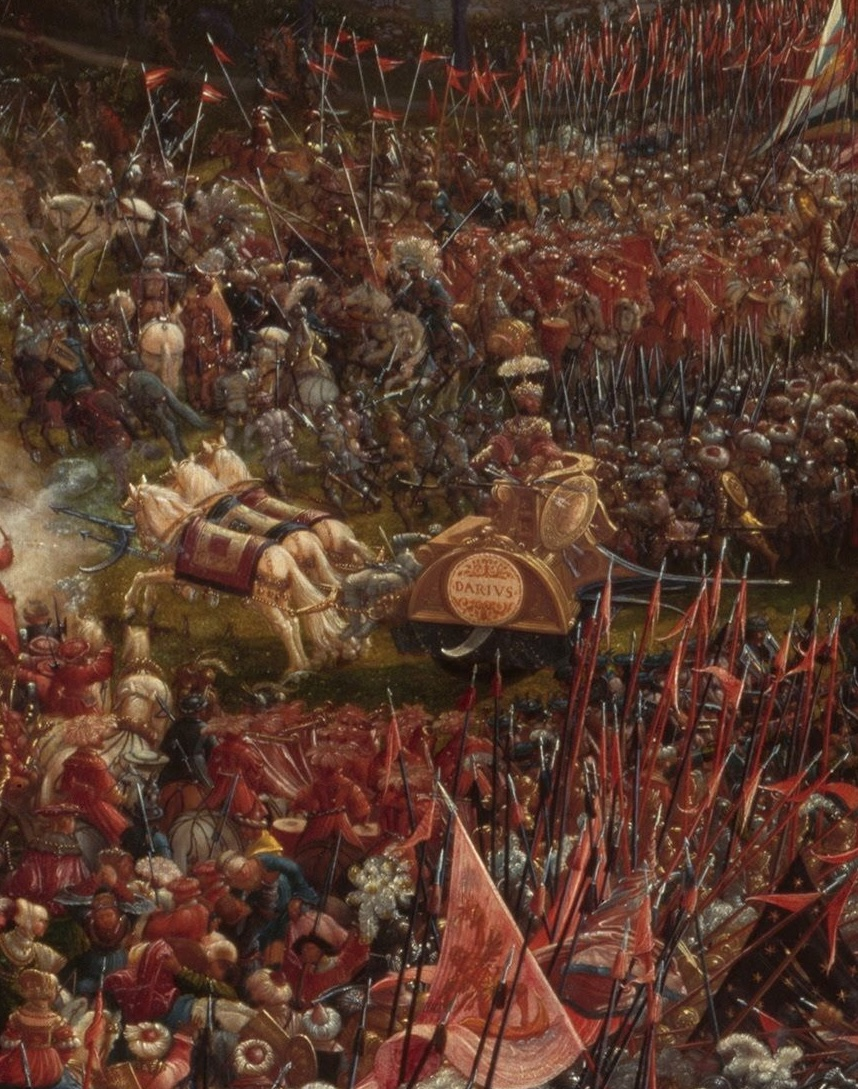
Detail of Darius III of Persia in flight

The Battle of Alexander at Issus is painted on a limewood panel measuring 158.4 cm × 120.3 cm (62.4 in × 47.4 in), and portrays the moment of Alexander the Great's victory. The vertical format was dictated by the space available in the room for which the painting was commissioned – each in William's set of eight was made to be the same size. At an unknown date, the panel was cut down on all sides, particularly at the top, so the sky was originally larger and the Moon further from the corner of the scene. The scene is approached from an impossible viewpoint – at first only feet from the fray, the perspective gradually ascends to encompass the seas and continents in the background and eventually the curvature of the Earth itself.

Thousands of horse and foot soldiers immersed in a sea of spears and lances populate the foreground. The two armies are distinguished by their dress, anachronistic though it is: whereas Alexander's men clad themselves and their horses in full suits of heavy armour, many of Darius' wear turbans and ride naked mounts. The bodies of the many fallen soldiers lie underfoot. A front of Macedonian warriors in the centre pushes against the crumbling enemy force, who flee the battlefield on the far left. The Persian king joins his army on his chariot of three horses, and is narrowly pursued by Alexander and his uniformly attired Companion cavalry. The tract of soldiers continues down the gently sloped battlefield to the campsite and cityscape by the water, gravitating toward the mountainous rise at the scene's centre.

Beyond is the Mediterranean Sea and the island of Cyprus. Here, a transition in hue is made, from the browns that prevail in the lower half of the painting to the aquas that saturate the upper half. The Nile River meanders in the far distance, emptying its seven arms into the Mediterranean at the Nile Delta. South of Cyprus is the Sinai Peninsula, which forms a land bridge between Africa and Southwest Asia. The Red Sea lies beyond, eventually merging – as the mountain ranges to its left and right do – with the curved horizon.

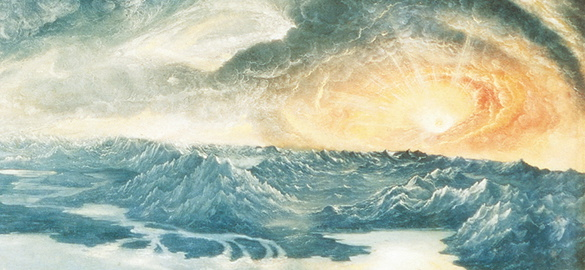
Detail of the Sun and the Nile River

A fierce sky caught in the dichotomy between the setting Sun and the crescent Moon dominates more than a third of the painting. The rain-heavy clouds swirling ominously around each celestial entity are separated by a gulf of calmness, intensifying the contrast and infusing the heavens with an unearthly glow. Light from the sky spills onto the landscape: while the western continent and the Nile are bathed in the Sun's light, the east and the Tower of Babel are cloaked in shadow.

The painting's subject is explained in the tablet suspended from the heavens. The wording, probably supplied by William's court historian Johannes Aventinus, was originally in German but was later replaced by a Latin inscription. It translates:

Alexander the Great defeating the last Darius, after 100,000 infantry and more than 10,000 cavalrymen had been killed amongst the ranks of the Persians. Whilst King Darius was able to flee with no more than 1,000 horsemen, his mother, wife, and children were taken prisoner.

No date is provided for the battle alongside these casualty figures. The lower left-hand corner features Altdorfer's monogram – an 'A' within an 'A' – and the lower edge of the tablet is inscribed with "ALBRECHT ALTORFER ZU REGENSPVRG FECIT" ("Albrecht Altdorfer from Regensburg made [this]"). Tiny inscriptions on their chariot and harness identify Darius and Alexander, respectively. Each army bears a banner that reports both its total strength and its future casualties.

=== Analysis and interpretation ===
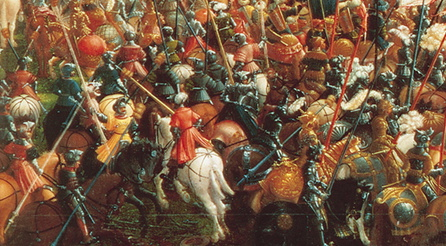
Detail of soldiers from both armies. Reinhart Koselleck comments that the Persians resemble the 16th-century Turks "from their feet to their turbans."

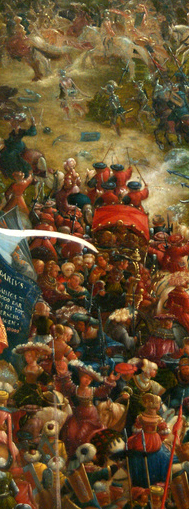
Detail of women on the battlefield

Anachronism is a major component of The Battle of Alexander at Issus. By dressing Alexander's men in 16th-century steel armour and Darius' men in Turkish battle dress, Altdorfer draws deliberate parallels between the Macedonian campaign and the contemporary European–Ottoman conflict. In 1529 – the year of the painting's commissioning – the Ottoman forces under Suleiman the Magnificent laid siege to the Austrian city of Vienna, then also the capital of the Holy Roman Empire and called 'the golden apple' by the Sultans. Although far inferior in number, the Austrian, German, Czech, and Spanish soldiers marshalled to defend Vienna were able to force the enemy into a retreat and stall the Ottoman advance on central Europe. It is probable the painting's underlying allegory was inspired by the siege of Vienna, given its similarities to Alexander's victory at Issus. Some critics go further, suggesting that the inclusion of anachronism may have been an element of Altdorfer's commission.

In his Futures Past: On the Semantics of Historical Time, historian Reinhart Koselleck discusses Altdorfer's representation of time in a more philosophical light. After differentiating between the superficial anachronism found in the casualty figures on the army banners and the deeper anachronism ingrained in the painting's contemporary context, he posits that the latter type is less a superimposition of one historical event over another and more an acknowledgement of the recursive nature of history. With reference to Koselleck, Kathleen Davis argues: "... for [Altdorfer], 4th-century Persians look like 16th-century Turks not because he does not know the difference, but because the difference does not matter ... The Alexanderschlacht, in other words, exemplifies a premodern, untemporalized sense of time and a lack of historical consciousness ... Altdorfer's historical overlays evince an eschatological vision of history, evidence that the 16th century (and by degrees also the seventeenth and eighteenth centuries) remained locked in a static, constant temporality that proleptically saturates the future as always a repetition of the same ... In such a system there can be no event as such: anticipation and arrival are together sucked into the black hole of sacred history, which is not temporalized because its time is essentially undifferentiated ..."

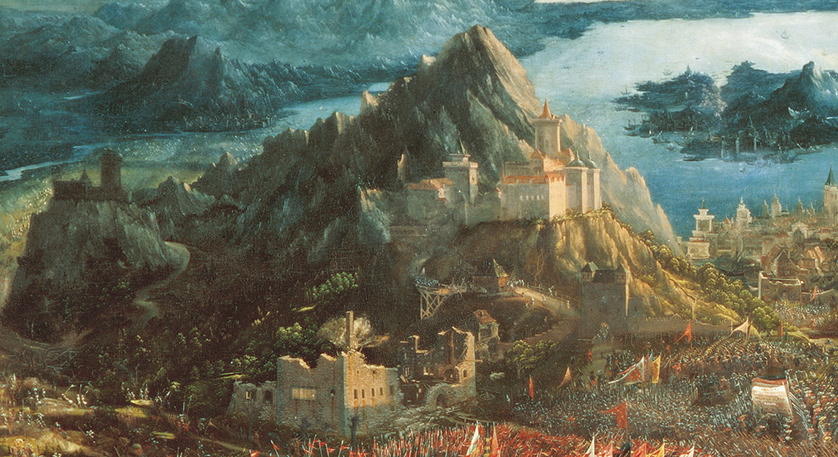
Detail of the fictitious mountain in the painting's centre

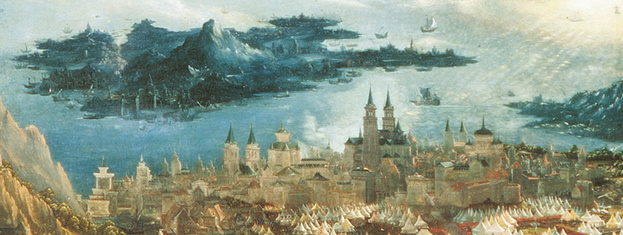
Detail of the oversized island of Cyprus and what is probably the city of Tarsus

Featured alongside the anachronism in The Battle of Alexander at Issus is a genuine lack of historicity. Altdorfer demonstrates minimal hesitance in neglecting the painting's historical integrity for the sake of its heroic style, in spite of the pains he took to research the battle. That the Persian army was up to twice the size of the Macedonian army is not clear, and the relative positioning of the soldiers as reported by ancient sources has been disregarded. According to art critic Rose-Marie Hagen, "The artist was faithful to the historical truth only when it suited him, when historical facts were compatible with the demands of his composition." Hagen also notes the placement of women on the battlefield, attributing it to Altdorfer's "passion for invention", since the wife of Darius, his mother and his daughters were waiting for Darius back at the camp, not in the thick of battle. True to form, however, Altdorfer made the aristocratic ladies "look like German courtly ladies, dressed for a hunting party" in their feathered toques:

Altdorfer's primary point of reference in his research was probably Hartmann Schedel's Nuremberg Chronicle (Schedelsche Weltchronik), an illustrated world history published in Nuremberg in 1493. Schedel was a physician, humanist, historian and cartographer, and his Chronicle was one of the first books produced on the printing press. With a heavy reliance on the Bible, it recounts the seven ages of human history, from Creation to the birth of Christ and ending with the Apocalypse. Altdorfer's statistics for the battle of Issus mirror those of Schedel. Furthermore, the errors in Schedel's maps of the Mediterranean and Northern Africa are also present in The Battle of Alexander at Issus: the island of Cyprus is noticeably oversized, and both the mountain rise in the painting's centre and the range adjacent to the Nile do not exist. Since the Chronicle describes Alexander's victory over the Persians in terms of its proximity to Tarsus and omits mention of Issus, it is likely that the cityscape by the sea is intended to be the former city rather than the latter. Issus in the 16th century was minor and relatively unknown, whereas Tarsus was renowned for its having been a major centre of learning and philosophy in Roman times. Tarsus was also said to be the birthplace of the Apostle Paul, which may explain the presence of the church towers in Altdorfer's portrayal. Another source may have been the writings of Quintus Curtius Rufus, a 1st-century Roman historian who presents inflated figures for the number of killed and taken prisoner and the sizes of the armies.

The sky bears overt metaphorical significance and is the centrepiece of the painting's symbolism. Alexander, identified by the Egyptians and others as a god of the sun, finds his victory in the sun's rays; and the Persians are routed into the darkness beneath the crescent moon, a symbol of the Near East. Considered in terms of the painting's contemporary context, the sun's triumph over the moon represents Christendom's victory over the Islamism of the Ottomans. Eschatological meaning, probably inspired by prophecies in the Book of Daniel, is imbued in the heavenly setting. In particular, Daniel 7 predicts the rise and fall of four kingdoms before the Second Coming; these were thought to be Babylon, Persia, Greece, and Rome at the time of the painting's creation. Altdorfer saw the Battle of Issus as a principal indicator of the transition of power from Persia to Greece, and thus as an event of cosmic significance. The battle also marked a progression toward the end of the world – an important theological concern in the 16th century, given that the last traces of Rome were diminishing with the papacy. As a member of the Regensburg council and a practising Catholic, Altdorfer frequently interacted with the Church and was surely aware of this trend of eschatological thought. Schedel, too, had calculated that the final age of the seven he identified was nigh. It may therefore be inferred that the sky's expression of the momentous event at Issus was intended to be of contemporary relevance as well.

== Legacy ==
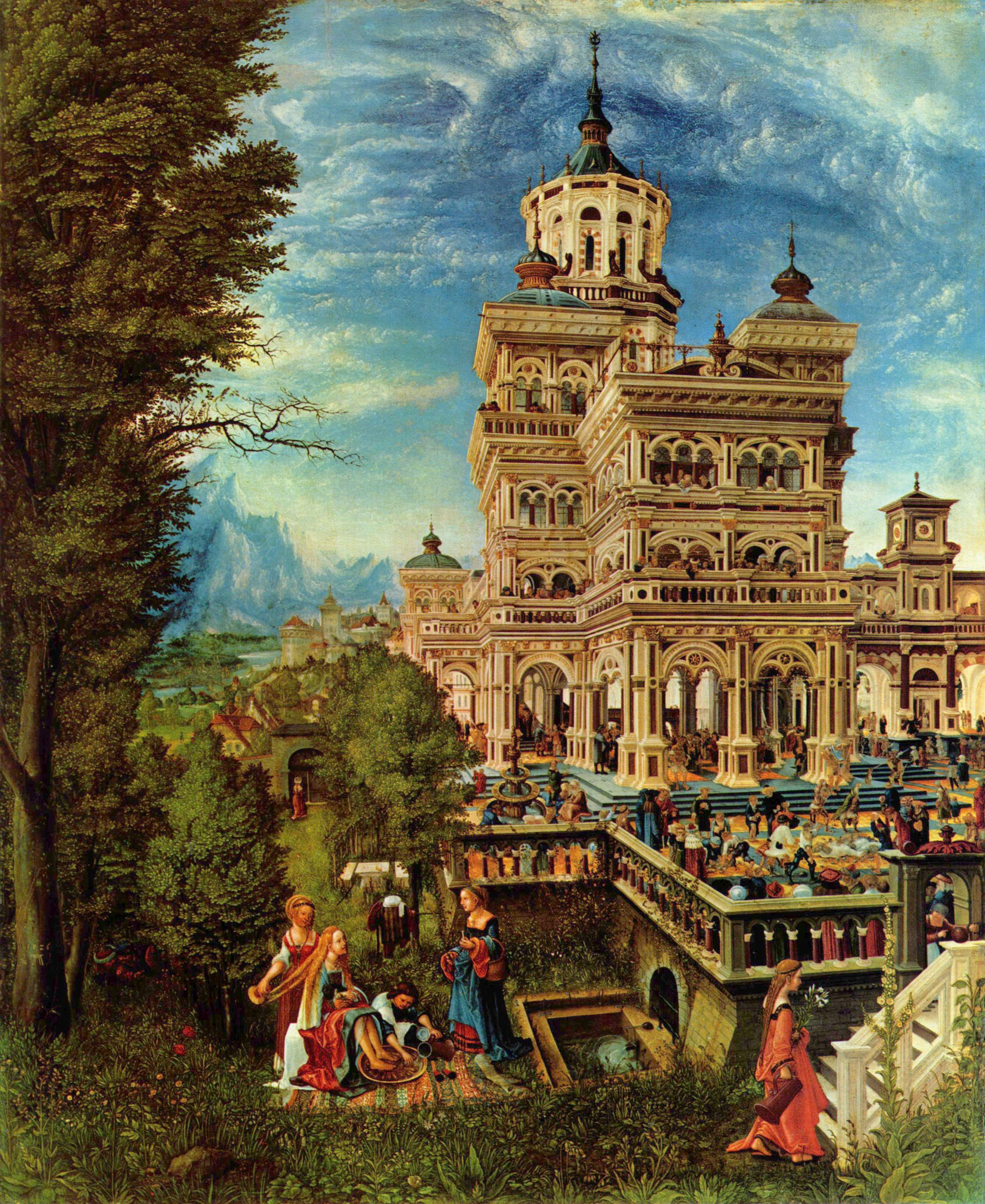
Susannah and the Elders (1526), the only other painting by Altdorfer in the Alte Pinakothek

The Battle of Alexander at Issus remained part of the royal collection of the Dukes of Bavaria for centuries. By the late 18th century, it was regularly featured in public galleries at the Schleissheim Palace. The painting was one of 72 taken to Paris in 1800 by the invading armies of Napoleon I (1769–1821), who was a noted admirer of Alexander the Great. The Louvre held it until 1804, when Napoleon declared himself Emperor of France and took it for his own use. When the Prussians captured the Château de Saint-Cloud in 1814 as part of the War of the Sixth Coalition, they supposedly found the painting hanging in Napoleon's bathroom.

The Battle of Alexander at Issus and 26 others taken in the 1800 invasion were subsequently restored to the King of Bavaria in 1815. Five of the paintings in William IV's original set of eight – including The Battle of Alexander at Issus – later passed from the royal collection to the Alte Pinakothek art museum in Munich, Germany, where they remain; the other three are in the National Museum of Fine Arts in Stockholm, having been looted by the Swedish army in the Thirty Years War of 1618–1648. Susannah and the Elders is the only other work by Altdorfer in the Alte Pinakothek.

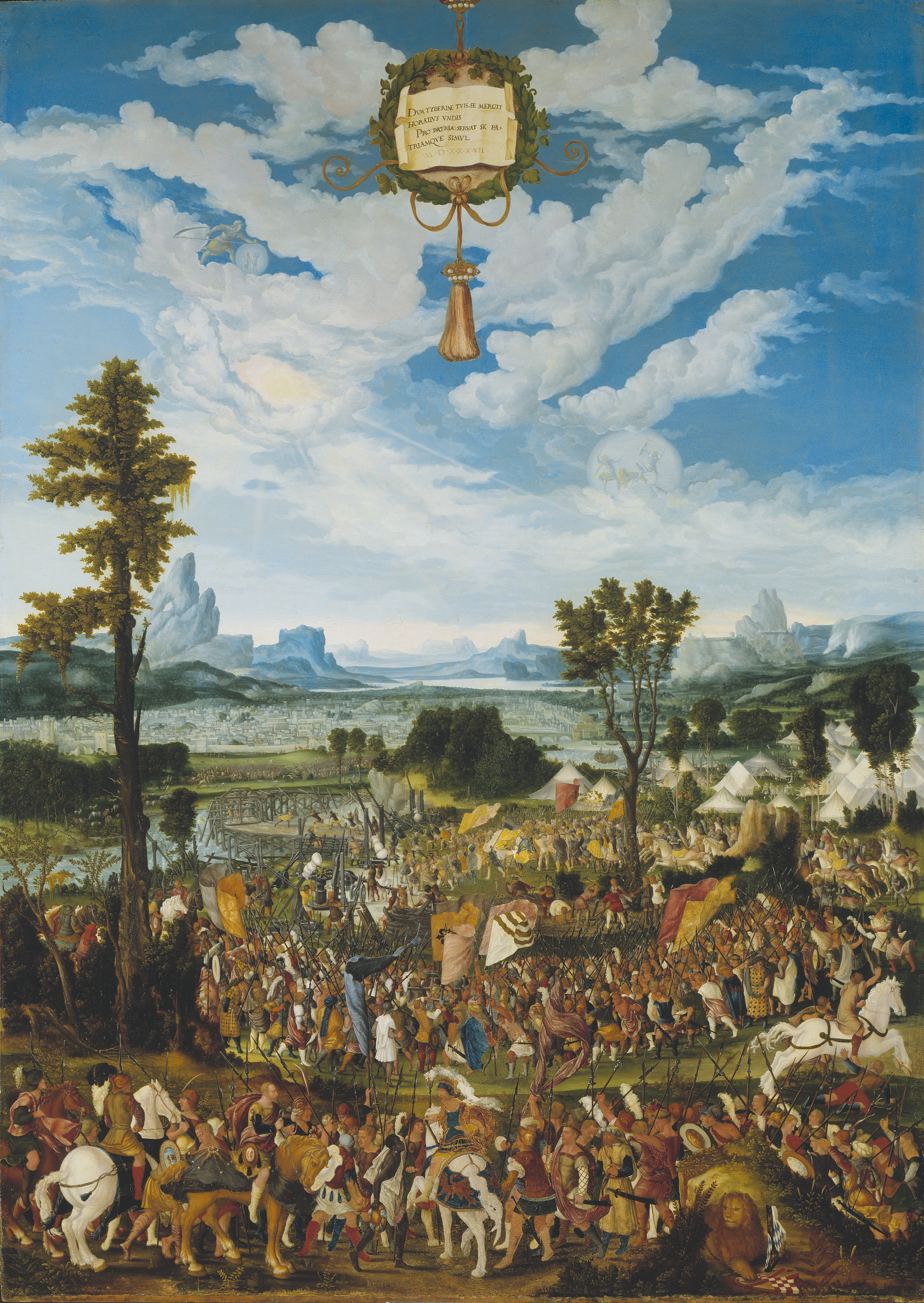
Horatius Cocles Stopping King Porsenna's Army outside Rome, by Ludwig Refinger. From the same historical cycle that The Battle of Alexander at Issus originally belonged to.

Contextually, the painting forms part of the Northern Renaissance, a resurgence of classical humanism and culture in northern Europe during the 15th and 16th centuries. The Renaissance induced a new kind of social individualism which Altdorfer expressed through the heroic emphasis on Alexander and Darius, and which is reflected in the specifics of the painting's commission and by the subjects of its companion pieces. According to Rose-Marie Hagen, "During the Renaissance people no longer saw themselves solely as members of a social group, as the citizens of a town, or as sinners before God in whose eyes all were equal. They had become aware of the unique qualities that distinguished one person from another. Unlike the Middle Ages, the Renaissance celebrated the individual. Altdorfer may have painted row after row of apparently identical warriors, but the spectators themselves would identify with Alexander and Darius, figures who had names, whose significance was indicated by the cord which hung down from the tablet above them."

Altdorfer was not only a pioneer of landscape, but also a practitioner of early incarnations of the Romanticism and expressionism which impacted the arts so greatly in the nineteenth and twentieth centuries. Kenneth Clark writes of Altdorfer and contemporaries Grünewald and Bosch, "They are what we now call 'expressionist' artists, a term which is not as worthless as it sounds, because, in fact, the symbols of expressionism are remarkably consistent, and we find in the work of these early 16th-century landscape painters not only the same spirit but the same shapes and iconographical motives which recur in the work of such recent expressionists as van Gogh, Max Ernst, Graham Sutherland and Walt Disney." According to art critic Pia F. Cuneo, "Altdorfer's construction of landscape on a cosmic scale" in the Battle of Alexander at Issus, and his "spiritual and aesthetic affinities with Romanticism and Modern art (in particular, German Expressionism)", "have been especially singled out for praise".

The Battle of Alexander at Issus is typically considered to be Altdorfer's masterpiece. Cuneo states that the painting is usually "considered in splendid isolation from its fifteen other companion pieces, based on the assumption that it either metonymically stands in for the entire cycle, or that its perceived aesthetic predominance merits exclusive focus." German writer Karl Wilhelm Friedrich Schlegel (1772–1829) was one of many who saw the painting in the Louvre and marvelled, calling it a "small painted Iliad". Reinhart Koselleck comments that Altdorfer's depiction of the thousands of soldiers was executed with "a mastery previously unknown", and Kathleen Davis describes the painting as "epochal in every sense".

== Gallery ==
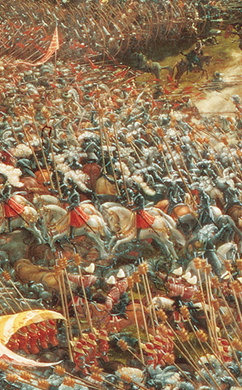
Detail showing the knights of Alexander heading east

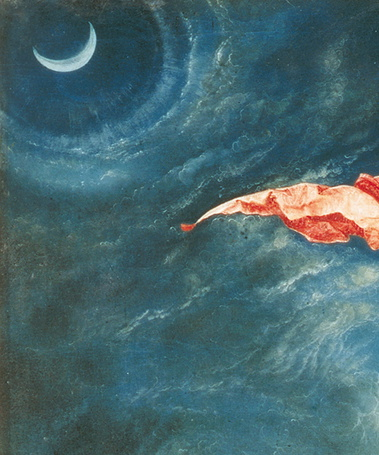
Detail of the crescent moon

Detail of the Tower of Babel

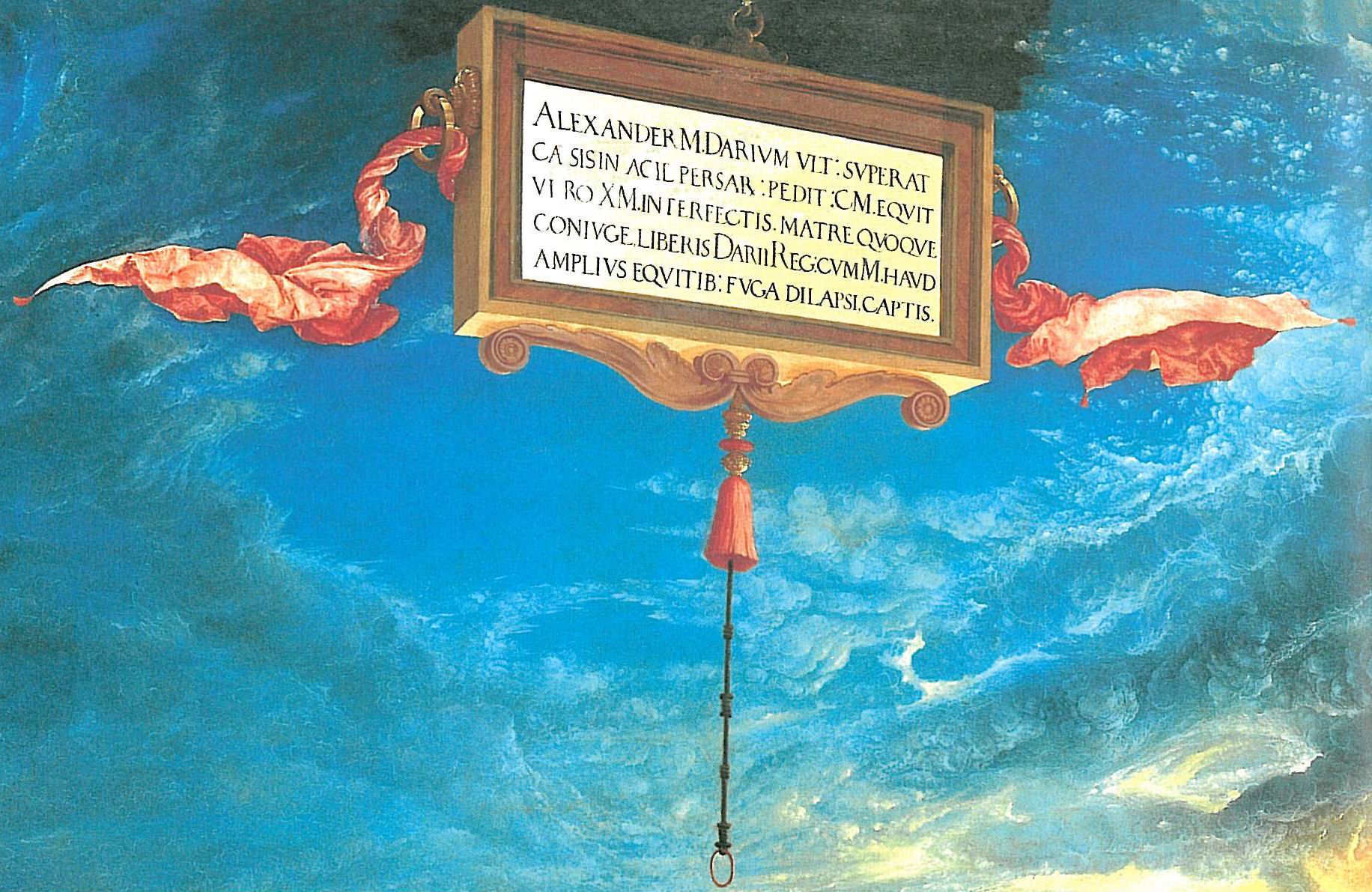
Detail of inscription

== See also ==
- 100 Great Paintings, 1980 BBC series
- List of landscapes by Albrecht Altdorfer
