= Critique and Crisis =

1954 dissertation by Reinhart Koselleck

Critique and Crisis is the title of the dissertation by the historian Reinhart Koselleck (1923–2006) from 1954 at the University of Heidelberg. In the 1959 book edition, it was initially subtitled A contribution to the pathogenesis of the bourgeois world, and later A study on the pathogenesis of the bourgeois world. In this work, Koselleck subjected the Enlightenment and its philosophy of history to a critical appraisal influenced by the authoritarian idea of the state of his early mentor Carl Schmitt. With this, he intended to expose the (seemingly) humanistic-universal theorems of the Enlightenment as "hypocritical" fighting concepts. In misjudging the peace function of the absolutist state in the religious wars of the 17th and 18th centuries, they had undermined its foundations. The elites of the bourgeoisie, who had risen under the protection of absolutism, had triggered a state crisis with their enlightening criticism, which ultimately led to the French Revolution. The widespread attention that the book received can be seen from the multiple reprints (first edition 1959; paperback edition 1973, 11th edition 2010) and the numerous translations.

== Origin ==
Koselleck had studied history, Staatslehre (state studies), sociology and philosophy in Heidelberg from 1947 and had been working on a historical dissertation for some time. To be able to accept a lecturer position at Bristol University, he realized in January 1953 that he had to complete his doctorate by October 1953. He submitted the thesis without annotations, which the faculty accepted (only later were the annotations typed up by a friend subsequently submitted). His doctoral supervisor was Johannes Kühn, a friend of his father's and also godfather to Reinhart Koselleck, who is occasionally referred to in the literature as his maternal uncle.

While writing his dissertation, Koselleck was in written contact with Carl Schmitt. He came into personal contact with Schmitt during his visits to the informal Schmittian circle of friends of Heidelberg students around Nicolaus Sombart, who knew Schmitt from his youth in Berlin, as well as Hanno Kesting and others.

More recent scholarship has criticized the fact that many details of these relationships are often presented inaccurately, speculatively, one-sidedly, misleadingly, or demonstrably incorrectly. However, further information can be expected from the forthcoming publication of the correspondence between Schmitt and Koselleck. At least one personal visit by Koselleck to Plettenberg in the Sauerland, Schmitt's last residence, has been recorded. In the foreword to the first edition and continuously since the third edition, Koselleck thanked Schmitt, who "helped him ask questions and seek answers in conversations".

== Topic ==
The subject of the book is the portrayal of a historical epoch in the 18th century that Koselleck sees as connected in terms of intellectual history: absolutism, the Enlightenment and the French Revolution. The birth of modern civil society from the womb of European absolutism is traced in three chapters. The introduction outlines the topic with two sentences: "Absolutism causes the genesis of the Enlightenment; the Enlightenment causes the genesis of the French Revolution".

According to Jürgen Habermas, this Enlightenment, conceived "from a dialectic of politics and morality", unfolds the premise that the absolutist state performs a pacifying function for "the space devastated by the religious civil wars". As a morally neutral institution, it granted its subjects freedom of conscience in the private sphere, as long as this was not directed against the sovereignty of the state. The absolutist state thus created the conditions for the rise of the bourgeoisie.

In a "secularization of criticism" of church and state, the self-confidence of the bourgeoisie, in alliance with the anti-absolutist nobility, broke the boundaries set by the state. The Enlightenment's criticism of the absolutist state led to a political crisis, the bourgeois revolution. Koselleck uses a medical metaphor to describe the bourgeois world and the crisis it triggered: he sees it as a "destructive disease".

According to the reviewer Helmut Kuhn, the axiomatic of the political "always affirmed in advance" owes much to his mentor Carl Schmitt, who is "present in every chapter of this study". Koselleck also adopted Schmitt's concept of civil war to grasp the structure of European history, as well as that of Schmitt's reading of Hobbes understanding of the absolutist purpose of the state as the perpetual prevention of civil war.

== Contents ==
=== First chapter ===
The first chapter examines the genesis and structure of the absolutist state as a prerequisite for the Enlightenment. Overcoming the religious civil wars is the raison d'être of absolutism. The state becomes the neutralizer of religious antagonisms. Thomas Hobbes's doctrine of the state is based on the fact that man becomes a subject; his actions are completely subject to state law, while he remains free in his private sphere. The state offers protection against obedience. Koselleck concludes that the "moral qualification of the sovereign" consists "in his political function of establishing and maintaining order." It is the "cruel experiences of the confessional civil wars" from which the European order of states has developed.

=== Second chapter ===
The second chapter deals with the emergence of the bourgeoisie as a new class of merchants, bankers, tax tenants and businessmen with a specific self-image. Taking into account the dualism of politics and morality that was constitutive of absolutism, the separation of man and subject, the bourgeois Enlightenment initially made the area of private morality the domain of their self-organization and criticism. Koselleck describes the Masonic lodges and the "Republic of Scholars" as their two most important forms of organization. The moral criticism they practiced in this private sphere first spread to the texts of the Holy Scriptures and then to the state, with the result that its authority was undermined. As its elite "negated the absolutist state and the church", the bourgeois class gained self-confidence and "increasingly regarded itself as the potential bearer of political power". Koselleck traces the stages of the increasingly political criticism of the writings of biblical exegetes Richard Simon and the Enlightenment philosophers Bayle, Voltaire, Diderot and Kant.

=== Third chapter ===
The third chapter describes the escalating crisis in the relationship between bourgeois society and the absolutist state as reflected in the writings of Rousseau, Raynal and Thomas Paine. Sovereign bourgeois criticism explodes the moral interior and brings about the "sovereignty of society" over the state. The crisis affects the state and society and, according to Rousseau, coincides with the revolution. Koselleck notes a blinded "rule of utopia" which, because it fails to recognize the essence of power (the prevention of civil war), takes "recourse to sheer violence" and seeks its justification in philosophy of history.

== Reference to the present ==
In the preface to the 1973 paperback edition and in its introduction, there are a few references to the current world-historical situation. Koselleck suggests that the dynamic set in motion by Enlightenment critique with its utopian exuberance, which led to revolution and terror, still determines the situation after the Second World War in a different constellation. The 18th century is described as the "anteroom of the present period", the tension of which has become increasingly intense since the French Revolution and has gripped the whole world.

For him, the "current world crisis", which is already addressed in the first sentence of the introduction, stands "within the horizon of a historical-philosophical, predominantly utopian self-image". The "legacy of the Enlightenment", he says in the final chapter, is "still omnipresent". In the preface to the 1988 English edition, he writes: "My starting-point was therefore to explain the utopian ideas of the twentieth century by looking at their origins in the eighteenth". In the context of the Cold War, the exclusive claim to moral and philosophical legitimacy of both liberal-democratic America and socialist Russia can be traced back to the ideas of the Enlightenment.

According to Jan-Friedrich Missfelder, Critique and Crisis definitely paraphrases, though never explicitly mentions, what Schmitt brings to the term: World Civil War is the category that analytically links the early modern period and the present. In his later conceptual history (Begriffsgeschichte), Koselleck also adheres to the view that utopias and secularized philosophies of history are the causes of (world) civil wars. His aim remains to "reverse the dialectic of critique-crisis" (Imbriano): to counter-critique the utopia of progress in order to prevent the crisis and "downfall" (Koselleck).

== Reformulation of the concept of crisis ==
In later publications, Koselleck continued to use the concept of crisis to diagnose the conditions of the modern era. However, the emergence of the bourgeois world is no longer negotiated solely on a political level, but is also explained in terms of social, technical and economic changes. He redefines the concept of crisis as a historical category of knowledge. Whereas in Critique and Crisis he diagnosed the crisis as a disease and modernity as the decay of an originally healthy organism, he later uses a historical term that describes the temporal dimension of acceleration. The metaphor of illness is abandoned.

The emergence of the modern world is no longer understood as pathogenesis, but merely as a historical change in social time structures. He considers its concepts of movement, such as "revolution, progress, development, crisis, zeitgeist, all expressions that contain temporal indications", to be an unmistakable criterion of the modern era. He now sees the acceleration of the modern world as a crisis and speaks of "increasing time pressure", even of an "apocalyptic shortening of time" from which humanity seems unable to escape.

He is now concerned with formulating a critique of the dangers of technical progress and conjuring up in the development of technology ever new possibilities of decay and crisis (mention is made of nuclear power and the atomic bomb), indeed catastrophes, which people have become capable of bringing upon themselves with their technical powers of disposal. Nevertheless, he sees the concrete possibility of doom or crisis not only in the acceleration of the technical world, but also as a political crisis on the horizon of world civil war.

== Dialectics of Enlightenment and Critique and Crisis ==
Presumably alluding to Koselleck's corresponding statements, historian Ute Daniel suspects: "If a book by Theodor W. Adorno and Max Horkheimer with the title Dialectic of Enlightenment had not been published in 1947, then Koselleck's dissertation would have been titled thus". The comparison of the two books is initially based on the fact that enlightening criticism turns into its opposite in the historical process, into despotism and comprehensive manipulation. However, the contexts of justification differ considerably: while Horkheimer and Adorno base this dialectic much deeper in the history of mankind, on the self-assertion of the subject, and do not ignore the progressive side of the Enlightenment, Koselleck's "illiberal critique of the Enlightenment" refers to the "illiberal critique of the Enlightenment" on political processes of the 17th and 18th centuries, whose Enlightenment critique would, according to him, lead to political crises and ultimately revolutions of a destructive nature. In the preface to the 1973 paperback edition, Koselleck writes expressly of a "dialectic of the Enlightenment", without, however, referring to the work of Horkheimer and Adorno.

The historian Michael Schwartz also states that Koselleck owes a great deal to Horkheimer and Adorno's critique of the Enlightenment: both approaches coincide in the finding that "Enlightenment is totalitarian". However, Koselleck's critique of the Enlightenment is "not an Enlightenment 'self'-critique as in Horkheimer/Adorno, but a (further) neo-conservative frontal attack from the outside". Koselleck's thesis is not aimed at the self-reflection of the Enlightenment, but at "its 'unmasking' as politically incapable and thus highly dangerous hypocrisy". Schwartz points out a further difference between the two publications: Horkheimer/Adorno's current interest in knowledge was aimed at a deeper understanding of National Socialism and the Second World War, while Koselleck's analysis purported to provide historical insight into the "Cold War" and the totalitarian threat from the East.

== Reception and influence ==
Years after its publication, 'Critique and Crisis' was described as the "most successful dissertation by a German humanities scholar in the 20th century in literary terms". The Swiss Wissenschaftsforscher Mario Wimmer summarized in his brief history of reception that the work was "in all cases perceived, translated and introduced as a 'classic'". The book has been translated into Spanish (1965), Italian (1972), French (1979), English (1988), Serbian (1997), Japanese (1999), Portuguese (1999) and Chinese (2006).

=== Early reviews ===
Koselleck asked Carl Schmitt, who had already accompanied the work on the study with questions and answers, to write a review after the printed version was published. A short review appeared in the yearbook Das Historisch-Politische Buch (an erroneous excerpt was later used as the blurb for the Suhrkamp edition without citing the source). Schmitt categorized the study as a contribution to the "history of ideas in the style of Friedrich Meinecke". According to Mario Wimmer, with this comparison Schmitt had awarded Koselleck the "rank of world renown".

Other early reviews were published by the philosopher Helmut Kuhn, the historian Christian Meier and the social philosopher Jürgen Habermas. This broad spectrum of disciplines of the reviewers alone shows that the dissertation was "neither only historically, nor only sociologically, nor only philosophically clearly identified", as was emphasized in the speeches at the celebratory event on the occasion of the 50th anniversary (an unusual honor for a dissertation).

=== Critical reception ===
Koselleck's writing was often received as a frontal attack on the secular religion of the Enlightenment. Within his conservative crisis theory, modernity is described as a time of decay. Using the metaphor of pathogenesis, he describes the beginning of the bourgeois world as the emergence of a disease within an originally healthy organism.

==== Jürgen Habermas ====
In his study on the formation of the bourgeois public sphere (The Structural Transformation of the Public Sphere, 1962) Habermas took up many of Koselleck's historical references. But as early as 1960 (in an essay in Merkur), he questioned the central thesis of the book: that criticism established as indirect political violence necessarily triggers the crisis was not convincing. By discrediting the "principle of public discussion as one of civil war", Koselleck failed to recognize the objective intention of the public sphere, which was not to moralize but to rationalize politics and later found its fulfilment in the form of the bourgeois constitutional state, through the institutionalization of the public sphere in parliament as an organ of the state. There is an inherent rationality in the developed market traffic between citizens that aims to transform political power into public power. The philosophy of history articulates "the idea of a feasible history", namely that people would take the historical process into their own hands.

==== Caspar Hirschi ====
The Swiss historian Caspar Hirschi sees the writing as a "prime example of historical-philosophical dialectics". Absolutism appears as the antithesis to the religious wars, the Enlightenment as the antithesis to absolutism. Koselleck wanted to convict the Enlightenment thinkers of blindness. His book is an attack with the weapons of the enemy, for he makes himself "the enlightener of the enlighteners, the critic of the critics". "In the best Enlightenment manner, he combines epistemic criticism with a moral verdict": criticism has been "stultified" into hypocrisy. Koselleck stylizes criticism as a "monster of modern power", which for him is incompatible with realpolitik.

==== Michael Schwartz ====
In a later assessment, Michael Schwartz subjected Critique and Crisis to a detailed critique. Identifying what he saw as historiographical errors, he argues that Koselleck adopts an overly sympathetic view of the absolutist understanding of politics. He further argues that Koselleck's account of the absolutist state overlooks the fact that, in many parts of Europe, there was often no causal relationship between confessional civil war and the emergence of absolutism (p. 38). Schwartz also rejected Koselleck's implied historical sequence in which opposition to absolutism leads through revolution to totalitarianism, as the path to modernity in Europe was taken through both revolution and reform (p. 54).

Continuing, Schwartz argues that Koselleck engages in apologetics of the political when he accuses the Enlightenment of having presumed to negate the autonomy of the political via utopian constructions, thereby laying the foundation for modern utopian-ideological totalitarianism (p. 35). In doing so, Schwartz contends, Koselleck made a historico-philosophically normative verdict on a complex historical process (p. 53). Moreover, Schwartz argues that, in his moral disqualification and schematic distortion of the Enlightenment, Koselleck employs the same hypercritical methods that he attributes to the totalitarian philosophy of history (p. 47).

Schwartz concludes by stating that Koselleck's "vacillation between anti-enlightenment moralism and historical-philosophical fatalism ... accumulates in the attitude of the moralizing-criticizing apologist of a 'politics'", "which is supposed to act free of all morality and criticism" (p. 57).

== Text editions ==
- Reinhart Koselleck: Kritik und Krise. Eine Studie zur Pathogenese der bürgerlichen Welt.
  - First edition: Verlag Karl Alber, Freiburg, Munich 1959.
  - Paperback edition: Suhrkamp Verlag, Frankfurt am Main 1973, ISBN 3-518-27636-0; 11th edition 2010.
- English-language editions: Reinhart Koselleck: Critique and Crisis. Enlightenment and the Pathogenesis of Modern Society.
  - Berg Publishers, Oxford 1988, ISBN 0-262-61157-0.
  - MIT Press, Cambridge, Massachusetts 1988.

== Literature ==
- Jürgen Habermas: Zur Kritik an der Geschichtsphilosophie. In: ders.: Kultur und Kritik. 2nd edition, Suhrkamp, Frankfurt am Main 1977, p. 355–364.
- Sisko Haikala: Criticism in the Enlightenment. Perspectives on Koselleck’s Kritik und Krise Study. In: Finnish Yearbook of Political Thought. Vol. 1 (1997), p. 70–86. (Weblink) (PDF; 49 kB)
- Sebastian Huhnholz: Von Carl Schmitt zu Hannah Arendt? Heidelberger Entstehungsspuren und bundesrepublikanische Liberalisierungsschichten von Reinhart Kosellecks „Kritik und Krise“(Academic Essays and Speeches on Philosophy, Politics and Intellectual History, Volume 95), Duncker & Humblot, Berlin 2019.
- Gennaro Imbriano: „Krise“ und „Pathogenese“ in Reinhart Kosellecks Diagnose über die moderne Welt. In: Ernst Müller (Hrsg.): Forum Interdisziplinäre Begriffsgeschichte. In: E-Journal.2nd year (2013), No. 1, p. 33–48. (Weblink) (PDF; 286 kB)
- Jan-Friedrich Missfelder: Weltbürgerkrieg und Wiederholungsstruktur. Zum Zusammenhang von Utopiekritik und Historik bei Reinhart Koselleck. In: Carsten Dutt, Reinhard Laube (Ed.): Zwischen Sprache und Geschichte. Zum Werk Reinhart Kosellecks. Wallstein, Göttingen 2003, p. 268–286.
- Michael Schwartz: Leviathan oder Lucifer. Reinhart Kosellecks ‚Krise und Kritik‘ revisited. In: Zeitschrift für Religions- und Geistesgeschichte. 45. Jahrgang (1993), Heft 1, p. 33–57.
- Mario Wimmer: Über die Wirkung geschichtswissenschaftlicher Texte. In: Schweizerische Zeitschrift für Geschichte (SZG). 62. Jahrgang (2012), No. 2, p. 217–238.

== See also ==
- The Elements of Law, Natural and Politic – 1640 philosophical text by Thomas Hobbes
- Leviathan (Hobbes book) – 1651 book by Thomas Hobbes
