= Tedo =

Tedo (Georgian: თედო) is a Georgian male given name. Notable people with this name include:

- Tedo Abzhandadze (born 1999), Georgian rugby union player
- Tedo Isakadze (born 1966), Georgian politician
- Tedo Japaridze (born 1946), Georgian politician
- Tedo Zhordania (1854–1916), Georgian historian, philologist, and educator
- Tedo Zibzibadze (born 1980), Georgian rugby union player
