= Tsotne =

Tsotne (Georgian: ცოტნე) is a Georgian masculine given name. Notable figures with this name include:

- Tsotne Bakuria (born 1971), Georgian politician
- Tsotne Dadiani (died c. 1260), Georgian nobleman
- Tsotne Machavariani (born 1997), Georgian sport shooter
- Tsotne Rogava (born 1993), Ukrainian Muay Thai kickboxer
