= Al-Tiflisi =

The Arabic nisbah, an attributive title, al-Tiflisi or al-Taflisi denotes an origin from or association with the city of Tbilisi, Georgia (Arabic: Tiflis, Taflis).

Al-Tiflisi may refer to:

- Ishaq b. Isma'il b. Shuab al-Tiflisi (died 853), an emir of Tiflis
- Abu 'Imran Musa al-Za'farani al-Tiflisi, a 9th-century Karaite Jewish leader
- Isa al-Raqqi Abul-Qasim al-Tiflisi, a 10th-century Muslim physician and astrologist
- Abu Muhammad al-Hasan b. Bundar al-Tiflisi, a 10th-11th-century Shiite literary scholar
- Hubaysh-i Tiflisi (died c. 1203/04 or 1231), a Muslim polymath scholar and poet
- Najm al-Din al-Tiflisi (died 1234), a Sufi imam and poet
- Kamal al-Din 'Umar al-Tiflisi (died 1273), a Damascene qadi

== See also ==
- List of people from Tbilisi
- Tiflisi (restaurant), in Toronto, Canada
