= Isakadze =

Isakadze (Georgian: ისაკაძე; Russian: Исакадзе; German: Isakadse) is a Georgian surname. Notable people with the surname include:

- Liana Isakadze (1946–2024), Georgian violinist and musical conductor
- Tedo Isakadze (born 1966), Georgian politician
