= Elizabeth Sombart =

French pianist

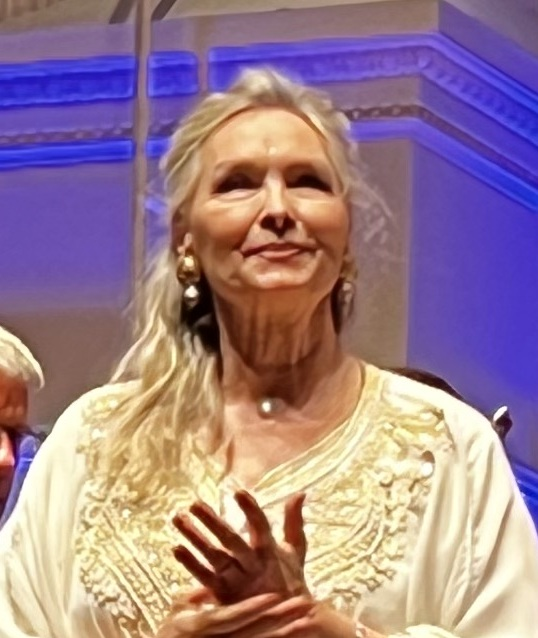
- Elizabeth Sombart, London, February, 2023

Background information
- Born: 1958 (age 66–67); Strasbourg, France
- Genres: Classical
- Occupations: Musician, professor of music
- Instrument: Piano
- Labels: Signum
- Website: https://www.elizabethsombart.com/en/home-english/

Elizabeth Sombart is a French classical pianist. In her youth she studied at the Strasbourg Conservatory where her first public performance was at the age of 11. She won first prize in National Piano Awards and Chamber Music Awards, and left France at age 16 to study with several classical piano masters on various continents. She has been a featured soloist in concerts with orchestras at well-known performance halls in Europe and the U.S. In addition to her concert performances, master classes, and recordings she has authored three books. In 1998, she created the Fondation Résonnance, a philanthropic organization which provides free music education and concerts with the goal of bring classical music to places it would not typically reach, including orphanages, hospitals, prisons and refugee camps. In 2006, Sombart was awarded one of the highest civilian honors France can bestow, the National Order of Merit (Chevalier de l'Ordre National du Mérite) for Lifetime Achievement for her humanitarian work, and in 2008 was made a Chevalier de l'Ordre des Arts et des Lettres for her artistic achievements.

== Career ==
Sombart was born in Strasbourg. Her father was German sociologist and historian Nicolaus Sombart. Her mother played the piano, but "not proficiently", Sombart said in a London interview. Sombart began piano at age seven and soon transitioned into formal study at the Strasbourg Conservatory. She said the piano felt like home to her, and that she never considered taking up any other instrument. After she won first prize in National Piano Awards and Chamber Music Awards, she left France at age 16 to study with several classical piano masters in Europe. These included Bruno Leonardo Gelber in Buenos Aires; Peter Feuchtwanger in London, then Hilde Langer-Rühl in Vienna. Sombart finished her studies with conductor Sergiu Celibidache at the Hochschule für Musik Mainz. She has performed as a featured soloist with many orchestras and performed in many prominent concert halls in Europe and the U.S., including Carnegie Hall (New York), the Théâtre des Champs-Élysées (Paris), Suntory Hall (Tokyo), and Wigmore Hall (London).

Sombart recorded the complete Beethoven piano concertos with London's Royal Philharmonic Orchestra conducted by Pierre Vallet. This work, along with their recording of Chopin's piano concertos was nominated by Classical Music Magazine as one of ten best recordings released for Beethoven's 250th anniversary. From 2011, she taught at Conservatoire Rachmaninoff in Paris. Sombart produced other recordings with the Royal Philharmonic Orchestra including J.S. Bach L’Art de la Fugue performed with Swiss organist Jean-Christophe Geiser in a piano and organ duo. She recorded all Chopin’s Nocturnes. Her Confidences pour piano de Bach à Bártok, a series of 50 works produced by Peter Knapp was broadcast on France 3 TV.

Sombart recorded for various small labels in the 1990s, performing the music of the Classical and Romantic periods. Sombart taught at the Federal Polytechnic School of Lausanne (EPFL) . She has written three books: Music at the Heart of Wonder, Words of Harmony, and They Call Me Plume.

== Humanitarian efforts ==
In 1998 she founded Fondation Résonnance, a philanthropic organization with the aim of bring classical music to hospitals, orphanages, prisons and refugee camps. Sombart said, "I have played in the most unbelievably deprived places where people have never seen a piano, and they were deeply touched by classical music". Based in Switzerland, the foundation has branches in Belgium, France (in Brittany and Paris), Spain, Italy, Lebanon, and Romania. It offers free classical music education, master classes and concerts. Free piano instruction is offered with no age limits or exam needed. Sombart herself typically performs about one hundred free concerts and classes each year, and her associates give about four hundred.

== Awards ==
In 2006, Sombart was awarded the highest honor that the French Government can give to a non-military person, the rank of Chevalier de l'Ordre National du Mérite for Lifetime Achievement for her humanitarian service, and in 2008 was made a Chevalier de l'Ordre des Arts et des Lettres for her artistic achievements. In 2022, she was awarded the title of honorary citizen of Tbilisi.

== Personal life ==
Sombart is the daughter of the German sociologist and historian Nicolaus Sombart (1923–2008). Her grandfather was Werner Sombart (1863–1941), a prominent German economist, also a historian and sociologist who received his PhD from the University of Berlin in 1888. Her great grandfather, Anton Ludwig Sombart (1816–1898), was an industrial entrepreneur, mayor of Ermsleben (in central Germany), and a member of the Prussian diet (parliament) and the German Reichstag.

== Discography ==
- Chopin, Barcarolle, op. 60; Berceuse, op. 57 and Sonata No. 3 op. 58 (1988, Adda) OCLC 658803692
- Schubert, Schumann, Liszt, Brahms (1989, Carrère 96831) OCLC 659102714
- Mozart, Sonatas K. 310 et 331, Variations Ah, vous dirai-je maman (décembre 1993, Quantum) OCLC 658583401
- Jean-Sebastien Bach, (December 1992, Quantum) OCLC 772461288
- Musique française : Satie, Ravel, Franck, Fauré, Desbrière (June 1993, Quantum QM6947) OCLC 658602061
- Schumann, Études symphoniques, op. 13 (1993, Quantum QM6922) OCLC 658584733
- Chopin, Fantaisie-Impromptu, Ballade (no. 1 and 4) 2 études; 2 nocturnes (no. 13 and 20), Mazurka No. 3 (November 1994, Quantum QM6958) OCLC 658600543
- Poulenc, Desbrière, Dutilleux, Roussel, Messiaen, Fauré : œuvres pour flûte - Patrick Gallois, flûte (Thésis) OCLC 25111051
- Confidences pour piano de Bach à Bartok : Schubert, Chopin, Schumann, Liszt, Brahms, Franck, Fauré, Ravel, Debussy, Tchaikowsky, Dvorak, Scriabine, Rachmaninov and Bartok (1997, 3 CD RCA) OCLC 416608463
- Chemin de croix : César Franck, Frédéric Chopin, Franz Schubertand Nicolas Buttet (October 1999, Cascavelle) OCLC 658437322
- Les Plus Belles Berceuses Classiques (The Most Beautiful Classic Lullabies). (Artati) 1998
- The Art of Chopin: the Piano Concertos with the Royal Philharmonic Orchestra/Peter Vallet (RPO) 1998
- Favourite Adagios from the Great Piano Concertos. (Orchid Classics) 2017
- Beethoven:Piano Concertos: Vol. 1,2,3. (Signum Classics) 2020
- Bach, J.S. Die Kunst der Fuge (The Art of the Fugue) (IFO) 2009
