= Saint George in the Forest =

Painting by Albrecht Altdorfer

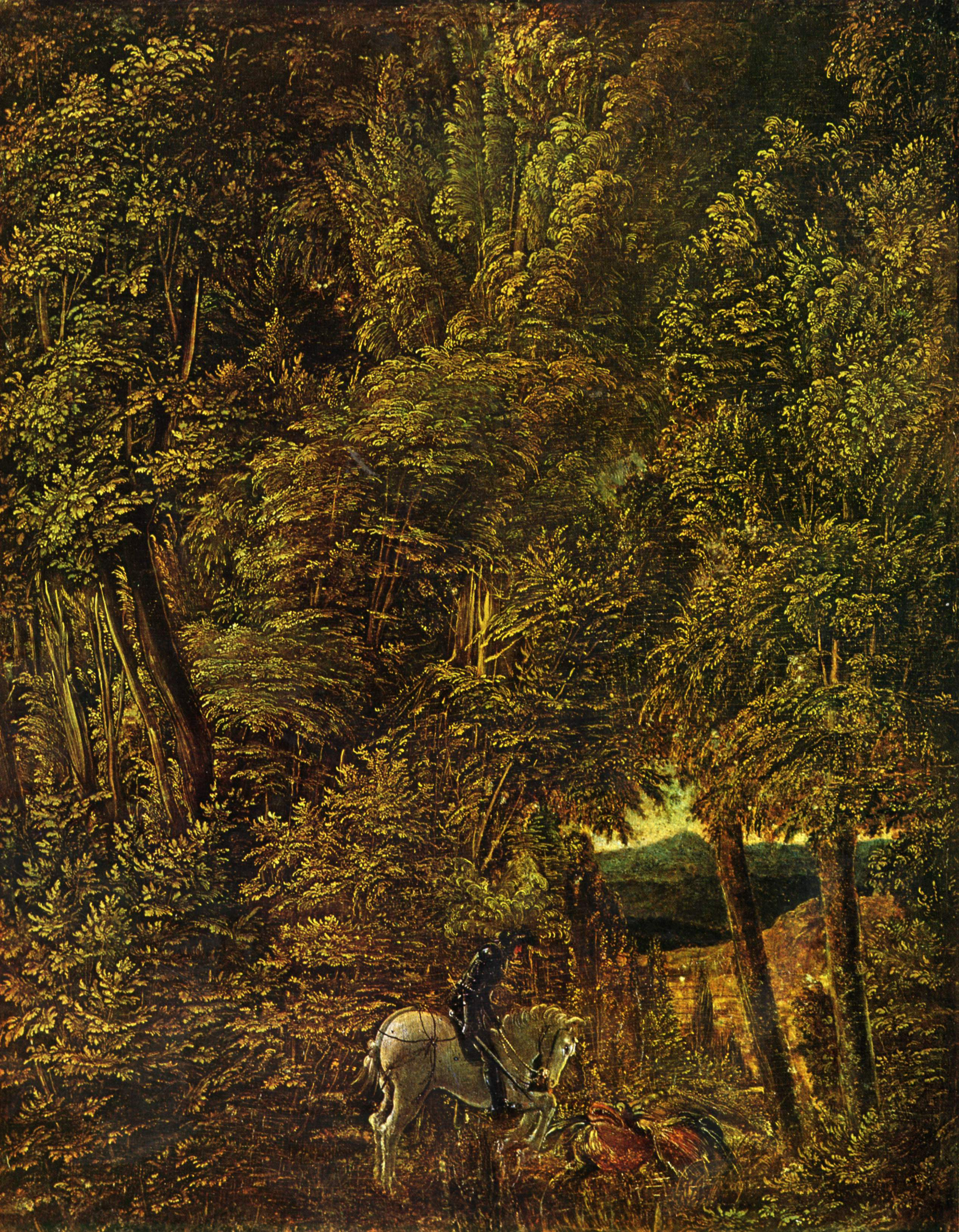
- Artist: Albrecht Altdorfer
- Year: 1510
- Medium: oil painting on parchment, mounted on linden wood panel
- Dimensions: 28 cm × 22 cm (11 in × 8.7 in)
- Location: Alte Pinakothek, Munich

Saint George in the Forest is an oil painting on parchment, mounted on linden wood by German artist Albrecht Altdorfer, datable to 1510 and held in the Alte Pinakothek in Munich.

== Description ==
The picture shows in the lower quarter the black armored saint on a white horse and next to it a rather inconspicuous red dragon. The horse is frightened of the monster, which George is staring at with his lance lowered. Most of the remaining space is filled with foliage; in the lower right half of the picture, the forest thins out and reveals a landscape with fields and mountains. The small-format picture is painted in oil on parchment; such a combination is quite unusual. Altdorfer uses the Alla Prima technique, known since the 16th century, which dispenses with layered structure, like underpainting and glaze, since only the yellow-green leafy scrolls are painted in the dark and the highlights are heightened.

The legendary episode of Saint George on horseback fighting with the dragon appears in this painting in fact more as a pretext, since it is relegated to the lower end of the table, to represent instead the magic of the wooded, harsh, and wild landscape, which evokes an arcane atmosphere full of suggestions, in which the human figures, overturning the traditional relationship, appear small and subordinated to natural forces. The colors are in accordance with the green and brown tones, while a sudden landscape opens in an unusual position, at the bottom right, where the gaze can sweep away towards the mountains that are lost in the distance.

== See also ==
- List of landscapes by Albrecht Altdorfer
