= Elena Dzamashvili =

Georgian pianist (1942–2020)

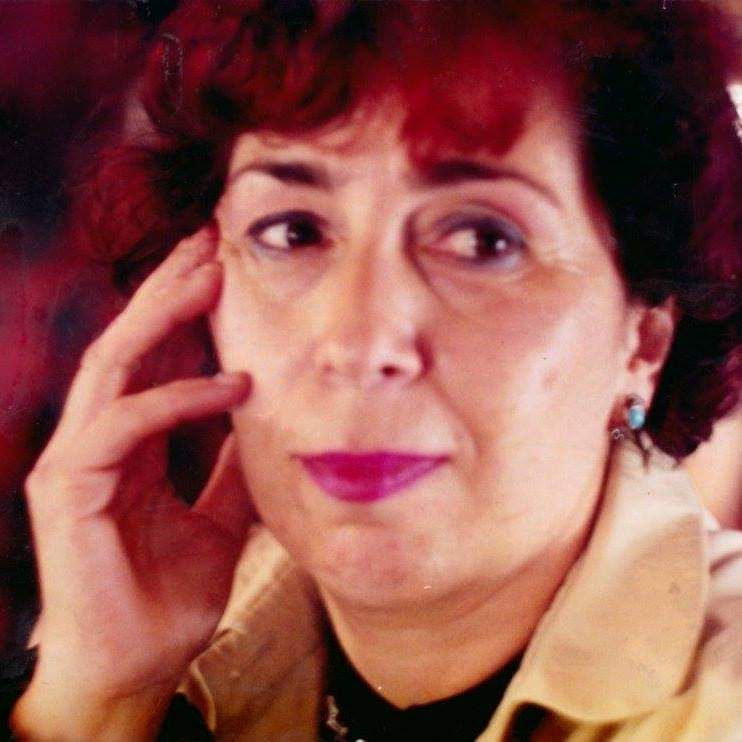
- Dzamashvili in 1990

Background information
- Born: 16 February 1942; Tbilisi, Georgian SSR, Soviet Union
- Died: 21 July 2020 (aged 78); Cairo, Egypt
- Genres: Classical music
- Occupation: Pianist

Elena Dzamashvili (Georgian: ელენე ძამაშვილი, romanized: elene dzamashvili; 16 February 1942 – 21 July 2020) was a Georgian classical pianist, professor of piano and chamber music who developed her professional career in two countries.

== Early life and career in Georgia ==
Dzamashvili was born on 16 February 1942 in Tbilisi.

Her mother Nino Dzamashvili worked at Georgian Public Broadcaster as a piano accompanist for singers. This fact had a crucial influence on Elena. As she recalled in an interview with the Egyptian Al-Ahram Weekly, as a child she would listen to the radio and then transfer her favourite songs into the piano, regardless of how challenging the melody was.

Dzamashvili entered the Second primary musical school, studying in Lusia Esayan's class. Upon its completion she continued her studies in the secondary musical college and in 1961 entered Tbilisi State Conservatoire where famous musicians Tatiana Goldfarb and Tengiz Amirejibi were her teachers.

At the age of fourteen, Dzamashvili had a first solo performance at the Conservatoire where later, from 1971 to 1990, she worked as accompanist and became a founder of vocal ensemble class. She performed on a regular basis with the Symphony Orchestra and also from 1978 to 1991 worked at Georgian Radio and TV company where she made over 600 recordings.

On 23 July 1990, by decree of the government, Dzamashvili was awarded the title of Honored Artist of Georgia.

== Career in Egypt ==
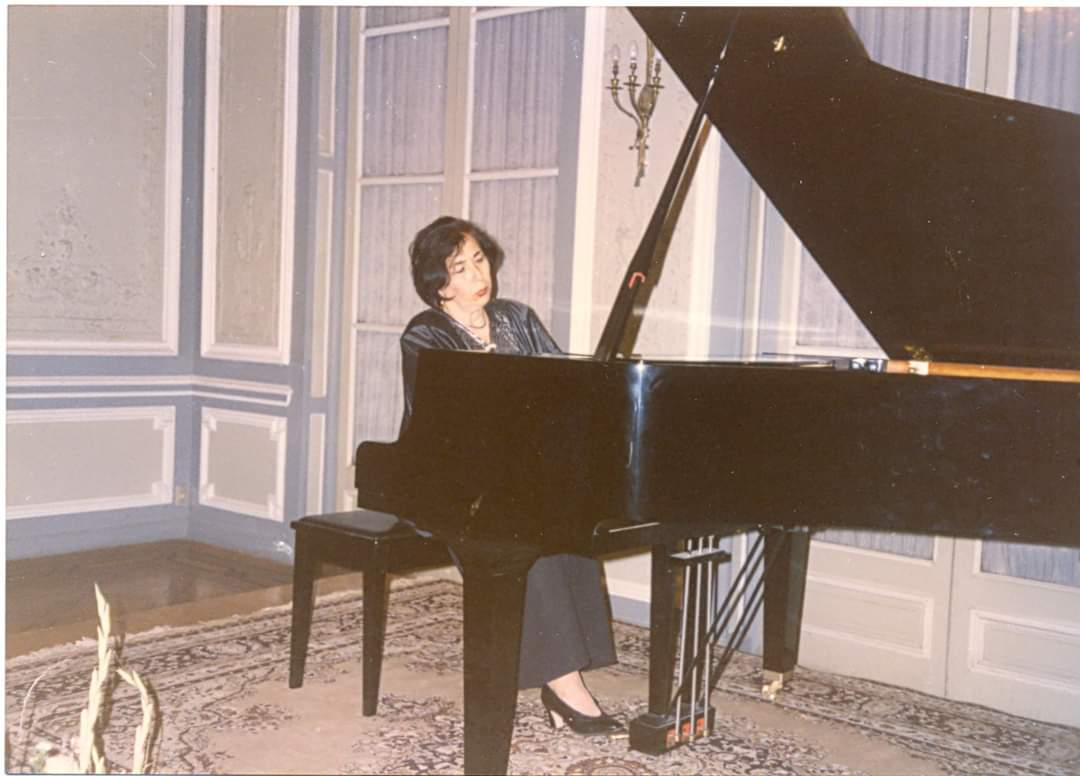
Elena Dzamashvili playing

As a result of developing cooperation between the Cairo Conservatoire and Georgian Conservatories, in September 1991 Dzamashvili was invited to Cairo as a piano accompanist, although shortly afterwards she also began teaching piano and chamber music for pianists, string players and vocalists. Since then each year she played solo recitals and performed for local as well as visiting musicians. Dzamashvili formed a musical duet with violinist Hassan Sharara and regularly played in the piano quartet with Egyptian pianists Iman Samy, Dina El Leithy and Iman Amin. Also, she played a trio recital with the Yehya sisters, who rose to prominence in Egypt and well beyond.

Besides, Dzamashvili worked at the American University in Cairo and at Talents Development Centre (TDC) created at the Cairo Opera House. She raised many prominent musicians, among them internationally known Mohamed Shams and Wael Farouk.

She was in close cooperation with Alexandria Opera House, participating in various musical events similar to the concert held in 2017 when the Opera String Orchestra celebrated its 14th anniversary.

Frédéric Chopin held a special place in Dzamashvili's repertoire since her early years. She viewed his preludes as the music representing all the emotions of human life and played all his works throughout her artistic life. She organized events dedicated to the 200th anniversary of the composer's birth in 2010. Four years later her two TDC students were among three winners of International Chopin Piano Competition. Abdel-Rahman Bahieldin, one of Dzamashvili's students awarded first place, paid a due tribute to the teacher by stating in an interview, "I appreciate very much her brilliance... and her dedication and integrity outside of teaching piano."

While far away from her native country, Dzamashvili arranged several concerts of classical music featuring Georgian and Egyptian composers, this way contributing to strengthening of cultural ties between these two countries.

== Death ==
Dzamashvili died in Cairo on 21 July 2020. She was buried at the Greek Orthodox cemetery in Mar Girgis historical area beside St George's church.
