= Robert Kondakhsazov =

Georgian artist, writer, and philosopher

Robert Kondakhsazov Роберт Кондахсазов
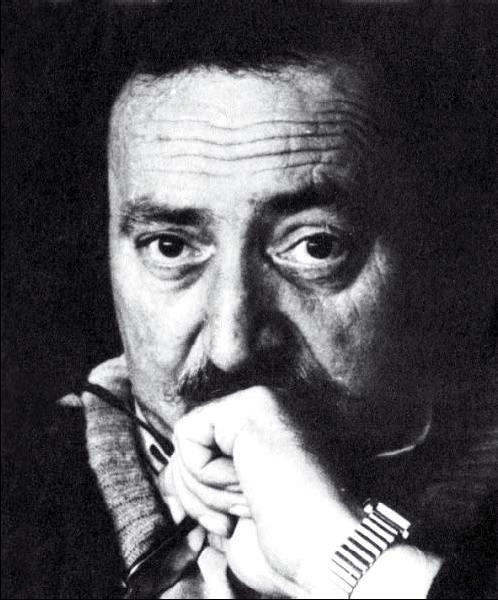
- Born: July 26, 1937; Tiflis (now Tbilisi), Georgian Soviet Socialist Republic, USSR
- Died: June 23, 2010 (aged 72); Moscow, Russia
- Occupation: Artist
- Awards: Honoured Artist of Georgia

Robert Kondakhsazov (Russian: Рóберт Абгáрович Кондахсáзов; July 26, 1937 – June 23, 2010) was a Georgian-born artist, writer and philosopher, and an Honored Artist of Georgia.

== Biography ==
Robert Kondakhsazov was born on July 23, 1937, in Tbilisi, Georgia.

After graduating from the Tbilisi Academy of Art in 1963 worked in the areas of design, book illustrating and scenography, was the lead artist of the Tbilisi state Puppetry theatre.

Kondakhsazov started exposing his art in 1964, first personal exhibition took place in 1989.

Starting October 2005 Kondakhsazov resided in Moscow, Russia where he deceased in 2010.

== Art and exhibitions ==
Robert Kondakhsazov is an author of over 1,000 paintings. They are stored in Tbilisi National Museum of Arts as well as in private collections in Russia, Armenia, Georgia, Great Britain, USA, France, Belgium, the Netherlands, Israel, Australia and other countries.

List of exhibitions includes:

- 1964, 1965, 1967, 1969, 1972, 1975 – annual poster exhibition in the State picture gallery of Georgia
- 1965 – participation in the decorative and applied arts exposition in All-Russia Exhibition Centre, Moscow, USSR
- 1973 – honored diploma of the Ministry of Culture of USSR and All-Russia theatrical society for performance design in Tbilisi State Puppetry
- 1988 – Retrospective exhibition of Georgian Art, Central House of Artists, Moscow, USSR
- 1989 – First personal exhibition in the House of Artist, Tbilisi, USSR
- 2000 – Exhibition "Yesterday-Today", "Vernisage" gallery, Tbilisi, Georgia
- 2002 – Art Exhibition, "TBC" Bank, Tbilisi, Georgia
- 2003 – "Kaleidoscope" Art Exhibition, Tbilisi, Georgia
- 2003 – "Sixtiers - Artists" exposition, National Art Gallery of Georgia
- 2003 – Personal exposition, "Sololaki" gallery, Tbilisi, Georgia
- 2006 – Personal exposition, "The Other Art" gallery of the Russian State University for the Humanities museum center (branch of the Pushkin Museum of Fine Arts)
- 2006 – "Dialogue of Cultures. Armenia – Russia" exposition, Moscow House of Nationalities
- 2008 – "New Eclecticism" exhibition, exhibition hall of Moscow Artists Union, Moscow, Russia
- 2008 – Personal Exhibition, "IBM" company, Moscow, Russia
- 2008 – Personal Exhibition, Roslin Art Gallery of Armenian Art, Moscow, Russia
- 2009 – "Art-Most" exhibition, Yerevan, Armenia
- 2010 – Memorial Personal Exhibition, Caucasus House, Tbilisi, Georgia

== Literature experience ==
Robert Kondakhsazov is an author of memoirs "Unfinished notebooks" (Russian: "Незаконченные тетради"), part of which was published in Friendship of Nations (Russian: Дружба Народов), Russia, Magazine in 2011. Apart from paintings, Robert Kondakhsazov wrote memoirs, poems and philosophical notes.

== Links ==
- Article about Robert Kondakhsazov by Vladimir Sarishvili
- "Unfinished Notebooks" memoirs, Robert Kondakhsazov, "Friendship of Nations" magazine (2011, №9)
- "Unfinished Notebooks" memoirs, Robert Kondakhsazov, "The Russian Club"
- Выставка памяти Роберта Кондахсазова в Тбилиси
- "Kondakhsazov's worlds", article, Artem Grigorenz
- Memorial Exhibition of Robert Kondakhsazov
