= 33a =

Georgian folk-rock band (founded 1994)

33a 33ა
- Origin: Tbilisi, Georgia
- Genres: Folk rock Pop rock
- Years active: 1994–present
- Labels: Extra-Estrada Records
- Members: Niaz Diasamidze; Spartak Kacharava; Achiko Tsimakuridze; Ramaz Khatiashvili

33a (Georgian: 33ა) is a Georgian folk-rock band founded in Tbilisi in 1994. The band combines Georgian and French folk influences with pop and reggae elements. They chiefly perform in Georgian and French. Currently, the band consists of four members: Niaz Diasamidze — lead vocal, guitar, keyboard, panduri; Spartak Kacharava — drums; Achiko Tsimakuridze — guitar; Ramaz Khatiashvili — bass guitar.

The name "33a" comes from the address — 33a, Paliashvili street, where the founder of the band Niaz Diasamidze lives.

== Discography ==
- Tbilisi (1997)
- Hurry up slowly (1999)
- Way (2001)
- New album (2005)
- Saperavi (2011)
- Usakhelouri (2013)
- Georgian (2017)
- War and Freedom (2022)
