= Nicolaus Sombart =

German sociologist

Nicolaus Sombart (10 May 1923 – 4 July 2008) was a German cultural sociologist, historian and writer.

The son of Werner Sombart and his Romanian wife Corina Leon, Sombart was known as an analyst of Wilhelmine Germany and a critic of Carl Schmitt. For nearly 30 years, Sombart benefited from an appointment as senior cultural civil servant attached to the Council of Europe in Strasbourg, while also continuing his career as a writer and academic, principally at the Free University of Berlin.

Sombart's daughter is the classical pianist Elizabeth Sombart.

== Honors and awards ==
Commander of the Order of Legion of Honour

== Bibliography ==
=== Works in German ===
- Capriccio Nr. 1: Des Wachsoldaten Irrungen und Untergang, Siegel-Verlag, Frankfurt 1947; Elster-Verlag, Baden-Baden/Zürich 1995, ISBN 3-89151-221-X
- Jugend in Berlin: 1933–1943, Ein Bericht,, Hanser, München/Wien, 1984, ISBN 3-446-13990-7
- Nachdenken über Deutschland: Vom Historismus zur Psychoanalyse, Piper, München/Zürich, 1987, ISBN 3-492-10596-3
- Die deutschen Männer und ihre Feinde: Carl Schmitt, ein deutsches Schicksal zwischen Männerbund und Matriarchatsmythos, Hanser, München 1991 ISBN 3-446-15881-2, Fischer TB, Frankfurt, 1997, ISBN 3-596-11341-5
- Pariser Lehrjahre: 1951–1954, leçons de sociologie, Hoffmann & Campe, Hamburg, 1994, ISBN 3-455-08539-3
- Wilhelm II: Sündenbock und Herr der Mitte, Volk und Welt, Berlin, 1996, ISBN 3-353-01066-1
- Rendezvous mit dem Weltgeist: Heidelberger Reminiszenzen, 1945–1951, S. Fischer, Frankfurt, 2000, ISBN 3-10-074422-5
- Journal intime 1982/83: Rückkehr nach Berlin, Elfenbein, Berlin, 2003, ISBN 3-932245-60-1
- Rumänische Reise: Ins Land meiner Mutter, Transit, Berlin 2006, ISBN 978-3-88747-209-2

=== Literature ===
- Saverio Campanini: Carteggio d'autunno tedesco. Uno scambio di lettere tra Gershom Scholem e Nicolaus Sombart a proposito di Carl Schmitt e d'altro, in: "Schifanoia" 52–53 (2017), p. 41–62.
