= Ludwig Refinger =

16th-century German painter

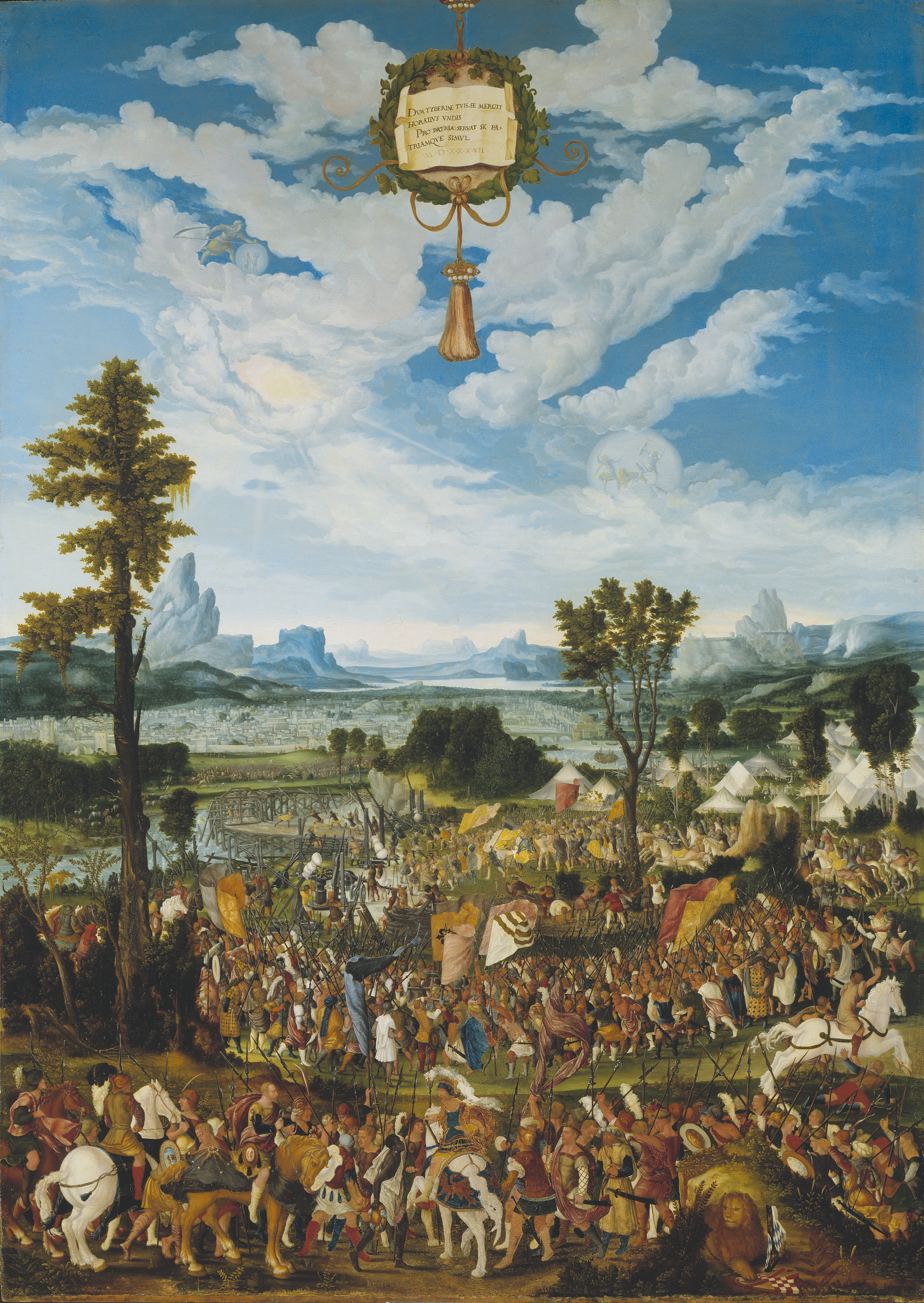
Horatius Cocles Stopping King Porsenna's Army outside Rome, by Ludwig Refinger (National Museum of Sweden)

Ludwig Refinger (sometimes Reffinger, born c. 1515, died in Munich 1549) was a German Northern Renaissance painter.

== Life and works ==
Refinger began his career as an apprentice to Wolfgang Mielich, and then started working with Barthel Beham. He received commissions by the Duke of Bavaria, William IV in 1537 and 1540. He contributed three pictures to a history cycle commissioned by the Duke. After Beham's death in 1540, he married his widow. In 1542 he again received a ducal commission, this time by Louis X to paint ceilings and design stained glass windows for the Landshut Residence.

His paintings show similarities to those of Barthel Beham and Hans Schöpfer the Elder, as well as influences from Italian art from the beginning of the 16th century.
