= Hubaysh-i Tiflisi =

Iranian physician

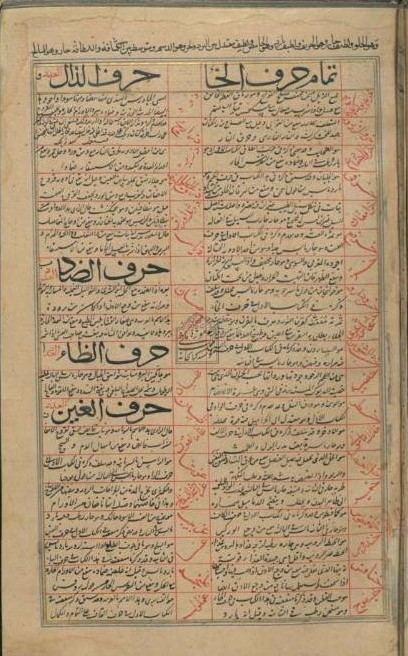
- The introduction to the simple drugs from a copy of Hubaysh-i Tiflisi's Taqvim al-Adwiya, dated 1545
- Died: c. 1203/04 or 1231

Hubaysh-i Tiflisi (Persian: حبیش تفلیسی; died c. 1203/04 or 1231) was an author who composed several scientific works in Persian and to a lesser degree Arabic during his stay in Seljuk-ruled Anatolia.

== Sources ==
- Peacock, A. C. S. (2019). Islam, Literature and Society in Mongol Anatolia. Cambridge University Press. ISBN 978-1108499361.
- Peacock, A. C. S. (2020). "A Seljuq Occult Manuscript and its World: MS Paris persan 174". In Canby, Sheila; Beyazit, Deniz; Rugiadi, Martina (eds.). The Seljuqs and their Successors: Art, Culture and History. Edinburgh University Press. pp. 163–179. ISBN 978-1474450348.
- Yazici, Tahsin (2004). "Ḥobayš b. Ebrāhim b. Moḥammad Teflisi". In Yarshater, Ehsan (ed.). Encyclopædia Iranica. Vol. XII/4: Historiography III–Homosexuality III. London and New York: Routledge & Kegan Paul. pp. 415–416. ISBN 978-0-933273-78-8.
- Riahi, Mohammad Amin (2008). "Nozhat al-majāles". Encyclopaedia Iranica.
- Yazıcı, Tahsin; Özgüdenlı, Osman G. (2000). "PERSIAN AUTHORS OF ASIA MINOR PART 1". In Yarshater, Ehsan (ed.). Encyclopædia Iranica (Online ed.). Encyclopædia Iranica Foundation.
