= Reinhart Koselleck =

German historian (1923–2006)

- Born: 23 April 1923; Görlitz, Province of Lower Silesia, Weimar Germany
- Died: 3 February 2006 (aged 82); Bad Oeynhausen, North Rhine-Westphalia, Germany
- Known for: Conceptual history Theories of historical time

Academic background
- Education: Heidelberg University
- Thesis: Critique and Crisis (1954)
- Doctoral advisor: Johannes Kühn
- Influences: Carl Schmitt

Academic work
- Discipline: History
- World War II
- Allegiance: Third Reich
- Branch: Wehrmacht
- Service years: 1941–1945
- Theatre: Eastern Front

Reinhart Koselleck (German: [ˈkoːzəlɛk]; 23 April 1923 – 4 February 2006) was a German historian. He is widely considered to be one of the most important historians of the 20th century. He occupied a distinctive position within history, working outside of any pre-established 'school', while making pioneering contributions to conceptual history (German: Begriffsgeschichte), the epistemology of history, linguistics, the foundations of anthropology of history and social history, and the history of law and government.

== Biography ==
Koselleck volunteered to serve as a soldier during World War II, having previously joined the Hitler Youth, the youth organisation of the German Nazi Party. In May 1945 he was captured by the Soviet Army and subsequently sent for debris removal to the Auschwitz concentration camp before being transported to Kazakhstan, where he was held as a prisoner of war for 15 months until being repatriated to Germany on medical grounds. He claimed that his personal experiences during the war were formative for his later academic direction, especially his interests in "crisis" and "conflict", and his sceptical stance towards "ideological" notions of moral or rational universalism and historical progress. He also claimed that the experience of being part of a defeated nation or culture enabled a more self-reflective form of historical understanding, and that the most interesting perspectives on history are often written by the vanquished rather than the victors.

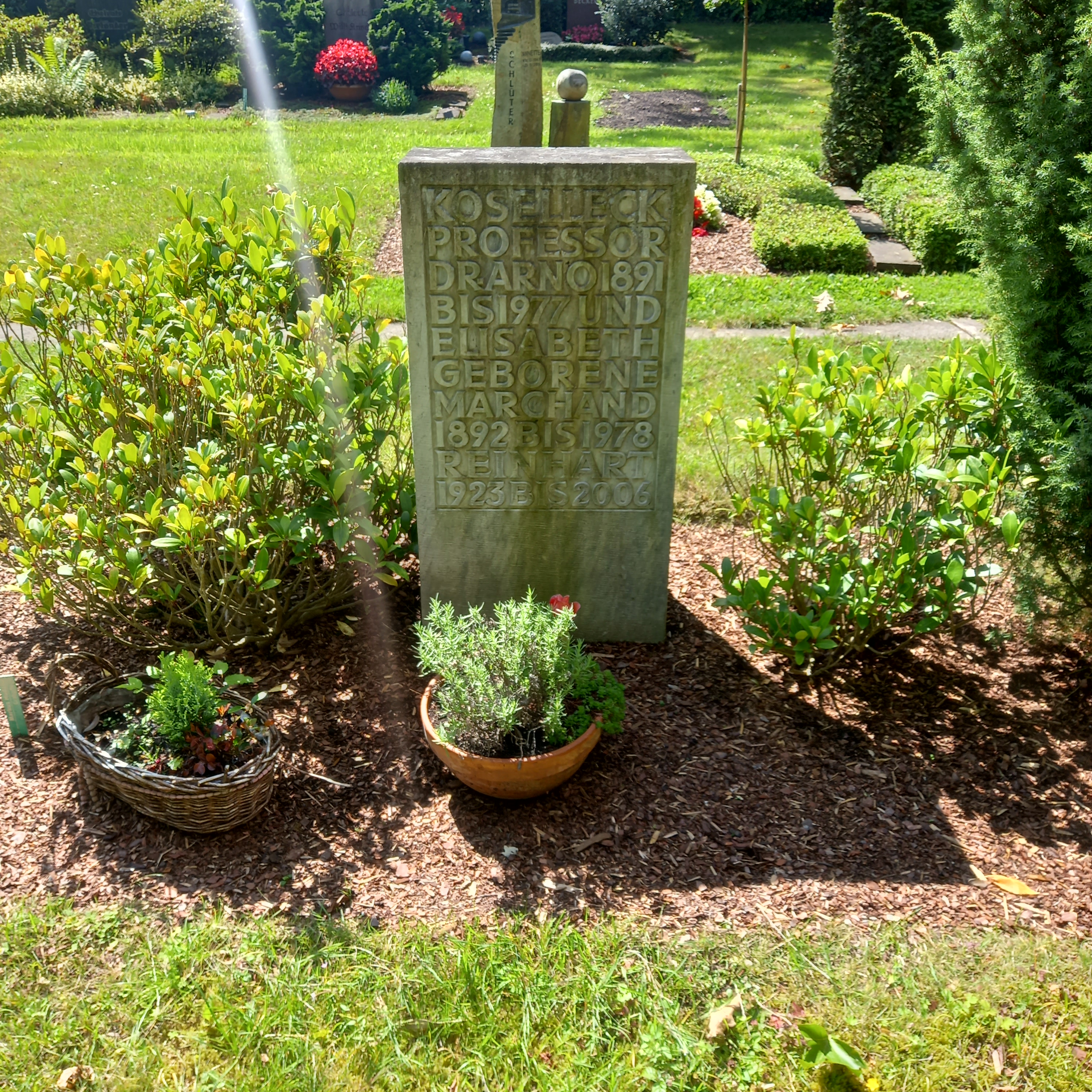
Grave of Reinhart Koselleck

He became known for his doctoral thesis Critique and Crisis (1954), which was strongly influenced by the thought of Carl Schmitt; his habilitation thesis on "Prussia between Reform and Revolution", deals with Prussia and Germany in the 18th and 19th centuries. Between 1972 and 1997 Koselleck co-edited, together with Werner Conze and Otto Brunner, the eight-volume encyclopedia Geschichtliche Grundbegriffe (Basic Concepts in History: A Historical Dictionary of Political and Social Language in Germany.") This work, together with his later contributions, became the corner-stone of conceptual history, the study of the changing semantics and pragmatics of concepts in their social and political contexts. Among his main contributions to historiography are his reflections on time and temporality in history and the history of language, most famously the leading hypothesis of the Geschichtliche Grundbegriffe about a saddle time or threshold time (Sattelzeit, 1750–1850), when language (in Germany) changed into the language of modernity.

Later in life, Koselleck became interested in the study of war memorials and published articles on the topic. He participated in public debates during the 1990s about the construction of the Holocaust Memorial in Berlin, arguing that as a nation Germany had a "special responsibility" to continue to acknowledge and remember the Holocaust, but that the memorial itself should remember all of the Holocaust's victims and not focus exclusively on a narrowly Jewish narrative.

== Critique and Crisis ==
=== Argument ===
==== From Absolutism to Enlightenment ====
In his dissertation and 1959 book, Koselleck argues that contemporary understandings of politics have become dangerously depoliticized by Enlightenment utopianism: A reaction against absolutism (the Hobbesian state), which was itself a reaction against the religious wars of the Reformation period in Europe.

Koselleck closely follows Carl Schmitt's argument from The Leviathan in the State Theory of Thomas Hobbes by arguing that the absolutist state had made morality a matter of strictly private and individual judgement, disallowing moral conscience any role in political decision-making. This overcame religious civil war and gave rise to the early modern, centralized state, which had a clear, narrow and authoritarian conception of politics as the monopolization of legitimate violence and the guaranteeing of obedience, security and order.

Consequently, within the absolutist state, the private realm grew in power, enabled by the degree of civil liberalism afforded by the regime toward private life. This private moral sphere was nurtured by the Enlightenment (especially, claims Koselleck, in the Republic of Letters and in "non-political" bourgeois secret societies such as the Illuminati and the Freemasons), consolidating itself around a self-conception as an emergent bourgeois "Society" during the 18th century. "Society" constituted a countervailing power which, by upholding the legitimacy of "critique" against existing political authoritarianism, eventually challenged the state, but in an apolitical, utopian way.

==== Permanent crisis and re-politicization of politics ====
"In the process," writes Victor Gourevitch in his foreword to Critique and Crisis, "existing political societies came to be judged by standards which take little or no account of the constraints which political men must inevitably take into account, standards which for all political intents and purposes are therefore Utopian." The problem, according to Koselleck, is that the moralism and utopianism of modern ideologies is purely speculative and can offer no viable alternatives to prevailing institutions and practices. Hence, Enlightenment's anti-statism creates a "permanent crisis", a relapse into a kind of ideological civil war, which had culminated in enduring political instability and particularly in the 20th-century phenomena of Soviet and Nazi totalitarianism and the ideological conflict of the Cold War.

Koselleck argues that politics is better understood from the point of view of public servants, politicians, and statesmen who are embedded within political institutions and immanently aware of their constraints and limitations, rather than from the supposedly disinterested perspective of philosophers and other social critics. His aim is to re-politicize contemporary discussions of politics and infuse them with a sense that conflict is an inevitable part of public life and an unavoidable factor in all political decision making, an argument reminiscent of Carl Schmitt, Koselleck's most important mentor.

=== Reception ===
Koselleck's portrayal of the Enlightenment public sphere in Critique and Crisis has often been criticized as reactionary and anti-modernist. His emphasis on the "secrecy" and "hypocrisy" of the 18th-century German Enlightenment, and his preoccupation with Enlightenment as a source of conflict and crisis, has been read as an overly pessimistic account of the origins of modern world-views. It sits in stark contrast to the work of Jürgen Habermas, whose account of the 18th century Enlightenment holds it up as a model of democratic and deliberative politics.

Moreover, his claim in the introduction of Critique and Crisis that the 20th century was gripped by a catastrophic "world crisis," has been criticized as being guilty of the same sort of secular eschatology he warns against within the text itself. In fact, for Koselleck modern philosophies were a form of a secularized version of eschatology: that is, theological prophecies of future salvation, an interpretation he adopted from Karl Löwith, his teacher at Heidelberg University. Others insist that the accusations against Koselleck of reactionary pessimism are overstated, and that he is rather attempting to engender a more reflexive and realistic use of political and social concepts.

== Works translated into English ==
=== Books ===
- Critique and Crisis: Enlightenment and the Pathogenesis of Modern Society. Cambridge, Mass.: MIT Press, 1988. ISBN 0262611570 | ISBN 978-0262611572
- The Practice of Conceptual History: Timing History, Spacing Concepts. Series: Cultural Memory in the Present. Translated by Todd Samuel Presner. Stanford: Stanford University Press; 2002. ISBN 0804743053 | ISBN 978-0804743051
- Futures Past: On the Semantics of Historical Time. Series: Studies in Contemporary German Social Thought. Translated and with an introduction by Keith Tribe. New York, Columbia University Press; 2004. ISBN 0231127715 | ISBN 978-0231127714
- Sediments of Time: On Possible Histories. Series: Cultural Memory in the Present. Translated and edited by Sean Franzel and Stefan-Ludwig Hoffmann. Palo Alto, CA: Stanford University Press; 2018. ISBN 1503605965 | ISBN 978-1503605961

=== Articles ===
- "Linguistic Change and the History of Events", Journal of Modern History 61(4): 649–666 (1989)
- "Social History and Conceptual History", International Journal of Politics, Culture and Society 2(3): 308–325 (1989)
- "Conceptual History, Memory and Identity", Contributions to the History of Concepts 2.1 (2006) A 2005 interview by Javier Fernandez-Sebastian.

== See also ==
- Historic recurrence
- Agonism
- Raymond Aron
