= Niaz Diasamidze =

Niaz Diasamidze ნიაზ დიასამიძე
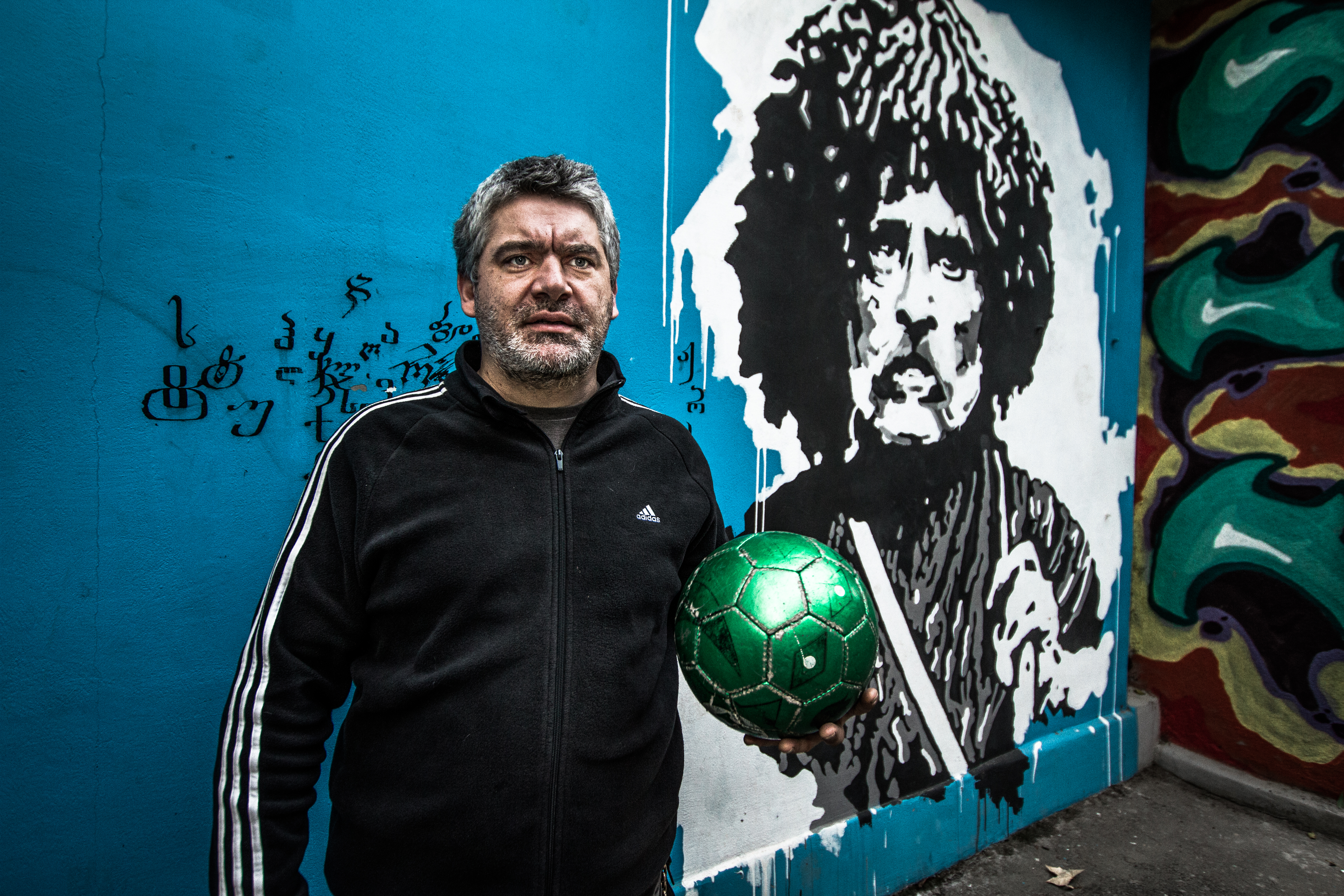
- Niaz with graffiti of Vazha-Pshavela

Background information
- Born: 13 July 1973 (age 52); Tbilisi, Georgia
- Genres: Rock, blues
- Occupations: Musician, composer, singer-songwriter
- Instruments: Vocals, panduri, guitar, keyboards
- Years active: 1990–present

Niaz Diasamidze (Georgian: ნიაზ დიასამიძე; born 13 June 1973) is a Georgian musician, singer, songwriter, calligrapher and actor, best known as the lead vocalist and a founder member of 33a.

Niaz was born in Tbilisi, the capital of then-Soviet Georgia. In 1994 he founded folk and pop rock band 33a, name of band comes from the address – 33a, Paliashvili street, where Diasamidze lives.

== Filmography ==
=== As composer ===
- 2014 Tiflisi (TV Series) (original music by)
- 2014 Tbilisi, I Love You
- 2013 Tangerines
- 2012 Bolo Gaseirneba
- 2011 Guli +
- 2009 Tbilisuri Love Story
- 2009 The Conflict Zone (original music by)
- 2008 Utsnobi jariskatsebi (Documentary)
- 2007 Subordinacia
- 2005 Tbilisi-Tbilisi
- 1997 Otsnebebis sasaplao
- 1995 Atu – Alaba (Otel Kalipornia) (Short)

=== As actor ===
- 1987 Pesvebi – Roots
