= Tsotne Bakuria =

Georgian political scientist

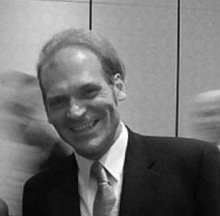
- Born: December 22, 1971 (age 54); Tbilisi, Soviet Union
- Education: Tbilisi State University (BA) Saarland University (BA) University of Erlangen-Nuremberg (MA)
- Occupation: Politician

Tsotne Bakuria (born December 22, 1971, in Tbilisi, Soviet Union) was a member of the regional legislature of the Autonomous Republic of Adjara, Georgia. In the Georgian parliamentary elections of November 2003, he was elected to the parliament of Georgia on the party list of the Democratic Revival Union. Tsotne Bakuria strongly supported Georgia’s independence from the Soviet Union as well the country’s non-alignment status and its strong stance towards political neutrality. After the Rose Revolution, Bakuria settled in the United States. He moved there because of his opposition to the national movement of Georgia. Tsotne Bakuria served a representative to the Council of Europe from 2001 to 2004.

He graduated from Tbilisi State University in 1993, and additionally received a BA in political science from Saarland University, Germany, in 1994. He received an MA in international relations from University of Erlangen-Nuremberg in 1998, and was a 2005 visiting scholar at George Washington University, Washington, D.C.

Tsotne Bakuria has serves as a board member of several international institutions providing support for global efforts in eliminating poverty and corruption and promoting sustainable growth of economic development on the African continent through citizens direct involvement in governance of national development projects.

Tsotne Bakuria comes from a noble family that has heavily contributed in the country’s educational institutions.

He strongly supports the idea of a peaceful solution to the various crises on the planet. Bakuria is an expert in Eurasian and the Caucasus region political affairs, has published numerous commentaries for international publications, and is a frequent television commentator.

Tsotne Bakuria is multilingual and along with his native Georgian he is fluent in several other languages including English, German, Russian, Ukrainian and Dutch/Flemish.

He is married and has two children.
