= Tedo Isakadze =

Georgian politician (born 1966)

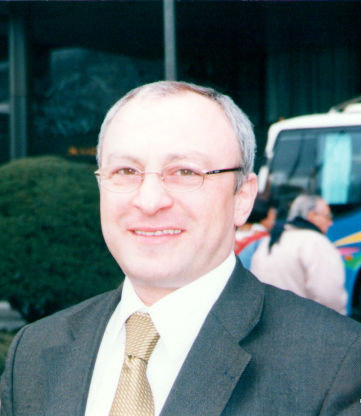

Personal details
- Born: 27 June 1966 (age 60) Tbilisi
- Citizenship: Georgia
- Education: Tbilisi State University
- Profession: Philologist

Tedo Isakadze (Georgian: თედო ისაკაძე, born 27 June 1966) is a Georgian politician.

== Biography ==
=== Education ===
In 1989 he graduated Tbilisi State University, the faculty of philology.

=== Student years ===
- During the student period, from 1986, he was propagandizing anti-Soviet Union activities.
- In 1987 was an activist of anti Soviet Union student movement and the founder of the first student dissident informal organization – "TSU student press-club"
- From 1988 together with his companions based on the newspaper of Tbilisi State University, begins publishing of " Student Page" with anti Soviet union and anti communist articles that were printed in semilegal form after the "restructuring" period.
- In 1989 the employee of "Georgian Christian Cultural Scientific Laboratory" of Tbilisi State University is publishing articles about the History of Literature, political science and Art.
- In 1990s meanwhile he is operating the business activities.
- Meanwhile, in 1993 he is publishing the first Georgian independent daily newspaper "Iveria Express". From the same year together with his companions is establishing the movement "Political Club".

== Politics ==
- In 1992-1995 represents the Chief of the State Department of Georgian Youth Affairs.
- 1995-1999 is the Charge of Georgian President State of Racha-Lechkhumi and Qvemo Svaneti. (Governor)
- 1999-2002 is the Deputy of Georgian State Minister (Vice-Premier Minister)

== Business ==
- From 2003 continues business activities and is the founder and the head of the Supervisory Board of the companies: "Mister Grini" (HoReCa, Cateringa), "Intercatalogi "
- From 2011 represents the president of companies, Eastern Enterprise Group" and 'King Enterprises GE".
- He has a wife and two children.
