= Saint Florian Taking Leave of the Monastery =

Painting by Albrecht Altdorfer

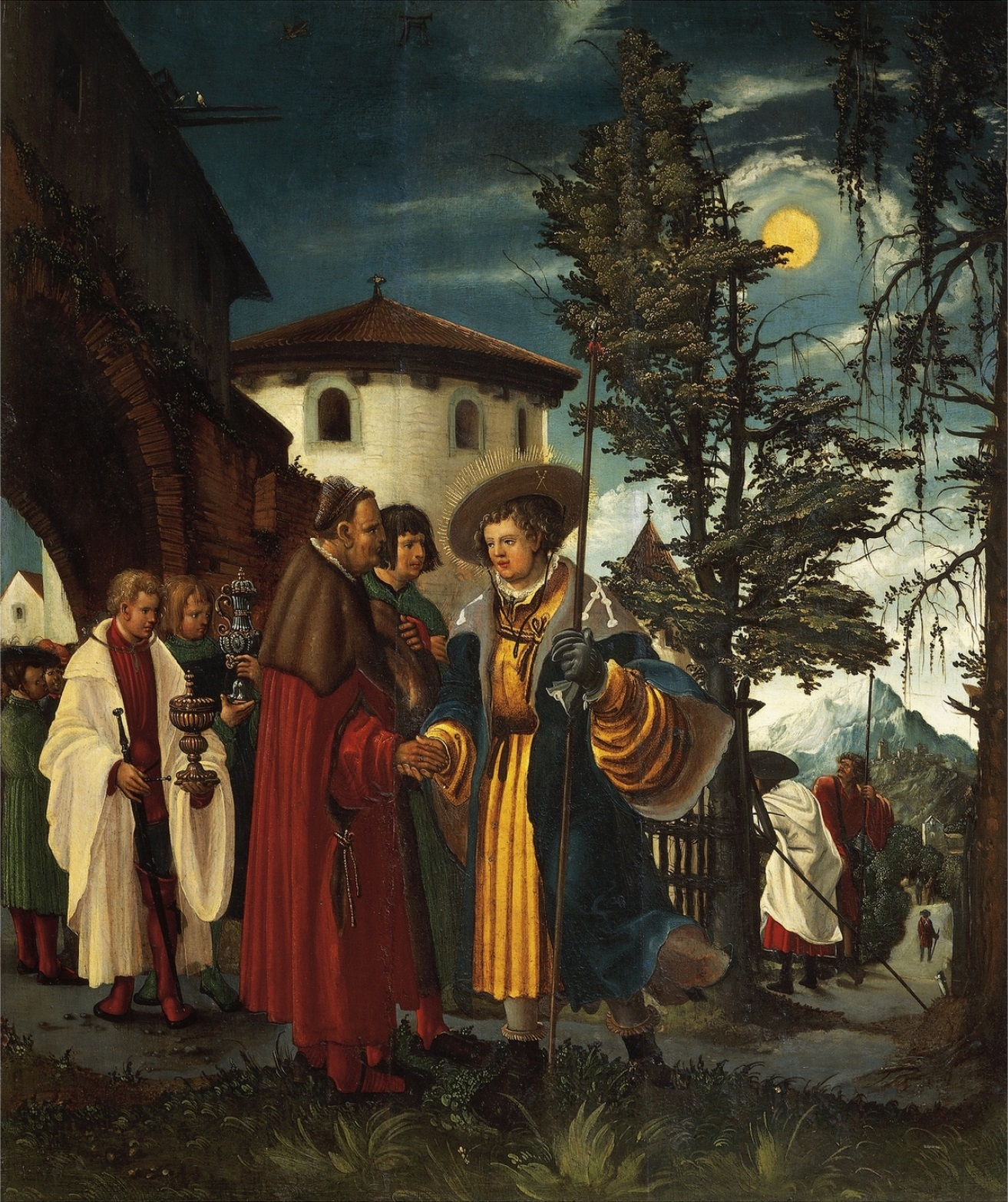
- Artist: Albrecht Altdorfer
- Year: c. 1518-1520
- Medium: oil on panel
- Dimensions: 76.4 cm × 67.2 cm (30.1 in × 26.5 in)
- Location: Uffizi Gallery, Florence

Saint Florian Taking Leave of the Monastery is an oil-on-panel painting by German artist Albrecht Altdorfer, dating from around 1518–1520. It is held in the Uffizi Gallery, in Florence.

== History ==
The work, analogous to the canvas The Martyrdom of Saint Florian, also in the Uffizi, is part of a series of at least seven panels of a polyptych on episodes about the life of Saint Florian, named Stories of Saint Florian. The other five panels are in the Germanisches Nationalmuseum, in Nuremberg, in number of three, one is in the Národní Galerie, in Prague and the other is held in a private collection in Berlin. The complete work was to resemble the Polyptych of the Stories of Saint Sebastian and of the Passion, painted by the same artist in Regensburg, for the collegiate church of Linz, in 1518.

== Description ==
Saint Florian, a Roman soldier from Enns, according to the tradition, had defended the Christians of Upper Austria in 304, during emperor Diocletian persecutions, which led to his martyrdom by means of tying a grindstone around his neck and throwing him into the Inn River. As a legend tells that he was able to extinguish a fire with a single bucket of water, he was often represented as a protector against fire.

In the painting, the young saint, dressed as a pilgrim, leaves the city, taking leave with the local dignitaries. A procession accompanies him. At the left is the arch of the city, and in the distance a mountain landscape, lit by an extraordinary light. The story of the painting, inspired by Paracelsus, is easily readable, due to the popular and catchy style.

== Provenance ==
The two Florentine paintings came to the Uffizi from the Spannocchi collection of the Pinacoteca Nazionale, in Siena, in an exchange that took place in 1914, to enrich the Northern Renaissance collection of the museum.

== See also ==
- List of landscapes by Albrecht Altdorfer
