= Nativity of the Virgin (Altdorfer) =

Painting by Albrecht Altdorfer

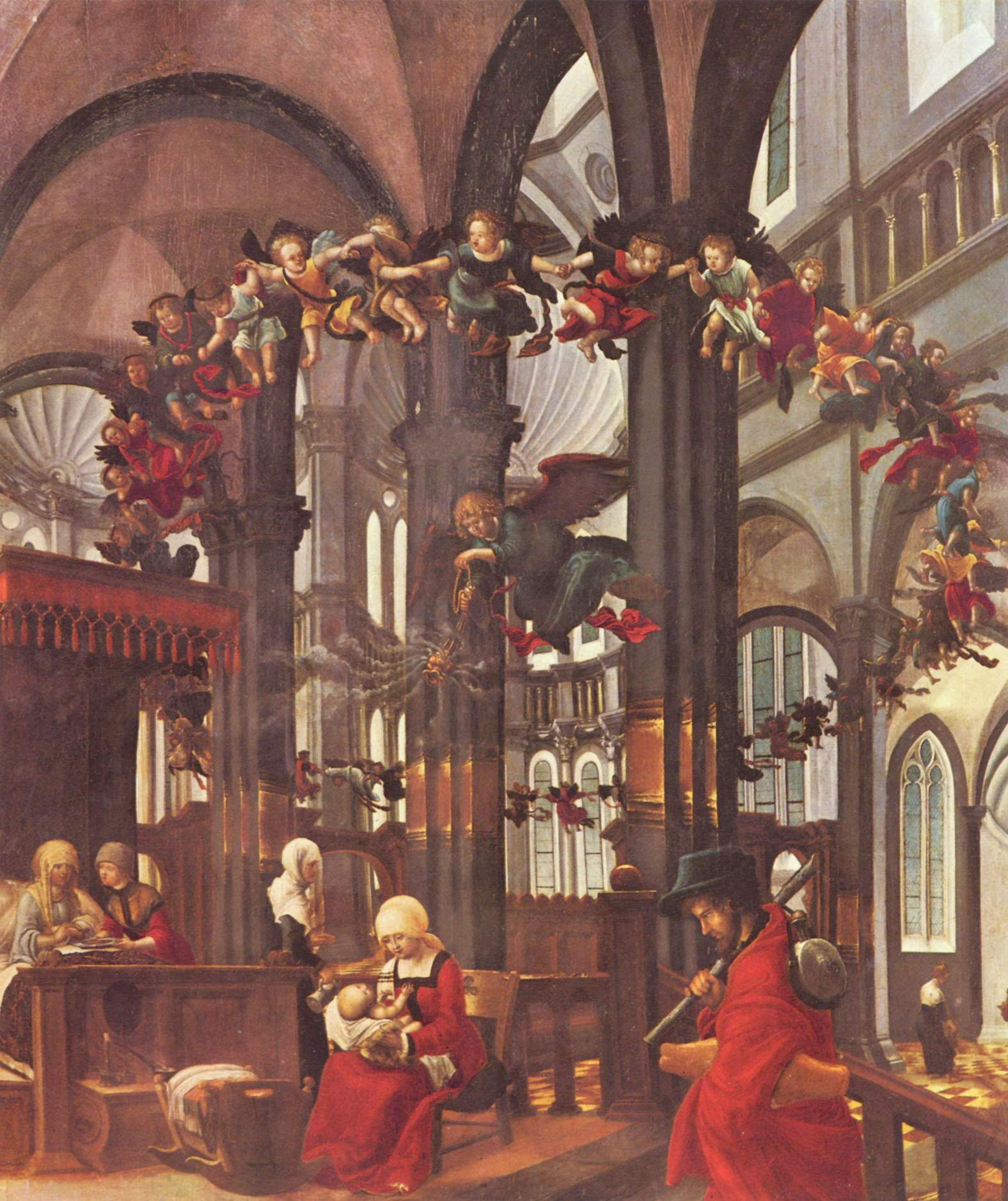
- Artist: Albrecht Altdorfer
- Year: c. 1520
- Medium: Oil on panel
- Dimensions: 140.7 cm × 130 cm (55.4 in × 51 in)
- Location: Alte Pinakothek; Munich

The Nativity of the Virgin is an oil-on-panel painting by the German Renaissance artist Albrecht Altdorfer, dating to c. 1520, which is now in the Alte Pinakothek in Munich.

== Description ==
The work uses a scenic composition typical of the Danube school of the time. The subject, the birth of Mary, is shown in a secondary location in the lower part of the painting. It includes St. Anne's bed, the midwives with the daughter. St. Joachim, having been out for provisions, returns with a bundle slung from his staff across his shoulder.

The predominant part of the work is the church background, where angels fly to form a large circle: in the middle is a young angel with a thurible for incense.

The edifice, symbolizing the analogy between Mary and the Catholic church (a subject later abolished by the Protestant Reformation), is organized in a complicated and original fashion: the ambulatory and the column galleries are Romanesque, the ogival windows are Gothic, the vaults and the shell-shaped niches are in Renaissance style. This attention to architectural elements was typical of Altdorfer's work in the period he spent at the court of Maximilian I.

== See also ==
- List of landscapes by Albrecht Altdorfer

== Sources ==
- Zuffi, Stefano (2005). Il Cinquecento (in Italian). Milan: Electa. ISBN 9788837034689.
