= 8121 Altdorfer =

Stony Flora asteroid

Discovery
- Discovered by: C. J. van Houten; I. van Houten-G. Tom Gehrels
- Discovery site: Palomar Obs.
- Discovery date: 24 September 1960

Designations
- Named after: Albrecht Altdorfer (Renaissance painter)
- Alternative designations: 2572 P-L · 1972 GR_{1} 1990 SU_{29}
- Minor planet category: main-belt · Flora

Orbital characteristics
- Epoch 4 September 2017 (JD 2458000.5)
- Uncertainty parameter 0
- Observation arc: 54.60 yr (19,942 days)
- Aphelion: 2.4633 AU
- Perihelion: 2.0129 AU
- Semi-major axis: 2.2381 AU
- Eccentricity: 0.1006
- Orbital period (sidereal): 3.35 yr (1,223 days)
- Mean anomaly: 259.90°
- Mean motion: 0° 17^{m} 39.84^{s} / day
- Inclination: 2.6838°
- Longitude of ascending node: 9.5259°
- Argument of perihelion: 113.38°

Physical characteristics
- Dimensions: 2.06 km (calculated); 2.474±0.491 km
- Synodic rotation period: 4.0221±0.0018 h
- Geometric albedo: 0.24 (assumed); 0.347±0.129
- Spectral type: S
- Absolute magnitude (H): 14.8 · 15.0 · 15.143±0.006 (R) · 15.56±0.31 · 15.59

8121 Altdorfer, provisional designation 2572 P-L, is a stony Flora asteroid from the inner regions of the asteroid belt, approximately 2 kilometers in diameter. Discovered during the Palomar–Leiden survey in 1960, the asteroid was later named for Renaissance painter Albrecht Altdorfer.

== Discovery ==
Altdorfer was discovered on 24 September 1960, by Dutch astronomer couple Ingrid and Cornelis van Houten at Leiden, on photographic plates taken by Dutch–American astronomer Tom Gehrels at Palomar Observatory in California, United States. No precoveries were taken, and no identifications were made prior to its official discovery observation.

The survey designation "P-L" stands for Palomar–Leiden, named after the fruitful Palomar–Leiden survey, a collaboration between the Palomar and Leiden Observatory in the 1960s. Gehrels used Palomar's Samuel Oschin telescope (also known as the 48-inch Schmidt Telescope), and shipped the photographic plates to Ingrid and Cornelis van Houten at Leiden Observatory where astrometry was carried out. The trio are credited with the discovery of several thousand minor planets.

== Orbit and classification ==
Altdorfer is a member of the Flora family, one of the largest groups of stony asteroids in the main-belt. It orbits the Sun in the inner main-belt at a distance of 2.0–2.5 AU once every 3 years and 4 months (1,223 days). Its orbit has an eccentricity of 0.10 and an inclination of 3° with respect to the ecliptic.

== Physical characteristics ==
Altdorfer has been characterized as a common S-type asteroid by Pan-STARRS photometric survey.

=== Diameter and albedo ===
According to the survey carried out by the NEOWISE mission of NASA's Wide-field Infrared Survey Explorer, Altdorfer measures 2.5 kilometers in diameter and its surface has a high albedo of 0.35, while the Collaborative Asteroid Lightcurve Link assumes an albedo of 0.24 – derived from the family's principal body and namesake, the asteroid 8 Flora – and calculates a diameter of 2.1 kilometers with an absolute magnitude of 15.59.

=== Lightcurves ===
A rotational lightcurve of Altdorfer was obtained through photometric observations taken at the Palomar Transient Factory in January 2012. Lightcurve analysis gave a rotation period of 4.0221 hours with a brightness variation of 0.34 magnitude (U=2).

== Naming ==
This minor planet was named in honour of German Renaissance painter Albrecht Altdorfer (1480–1538). As a member of the Danube school, he was the first to paint landscapes without figures. Altdorfer was also an architect of the city of Regensburg, Germany, after which the minor planet 927 Ratisbona is named, and was also a significant printmaker, with numerous (copper) engravings and woodcuts. The approved naming citation was published by the Minor Planet Center on 2 April 1999 (M.P.C. 34345).
