= The Victory of Charlemagne over the Avars near Regensburg =

Painting by Albrecht Altdorfer

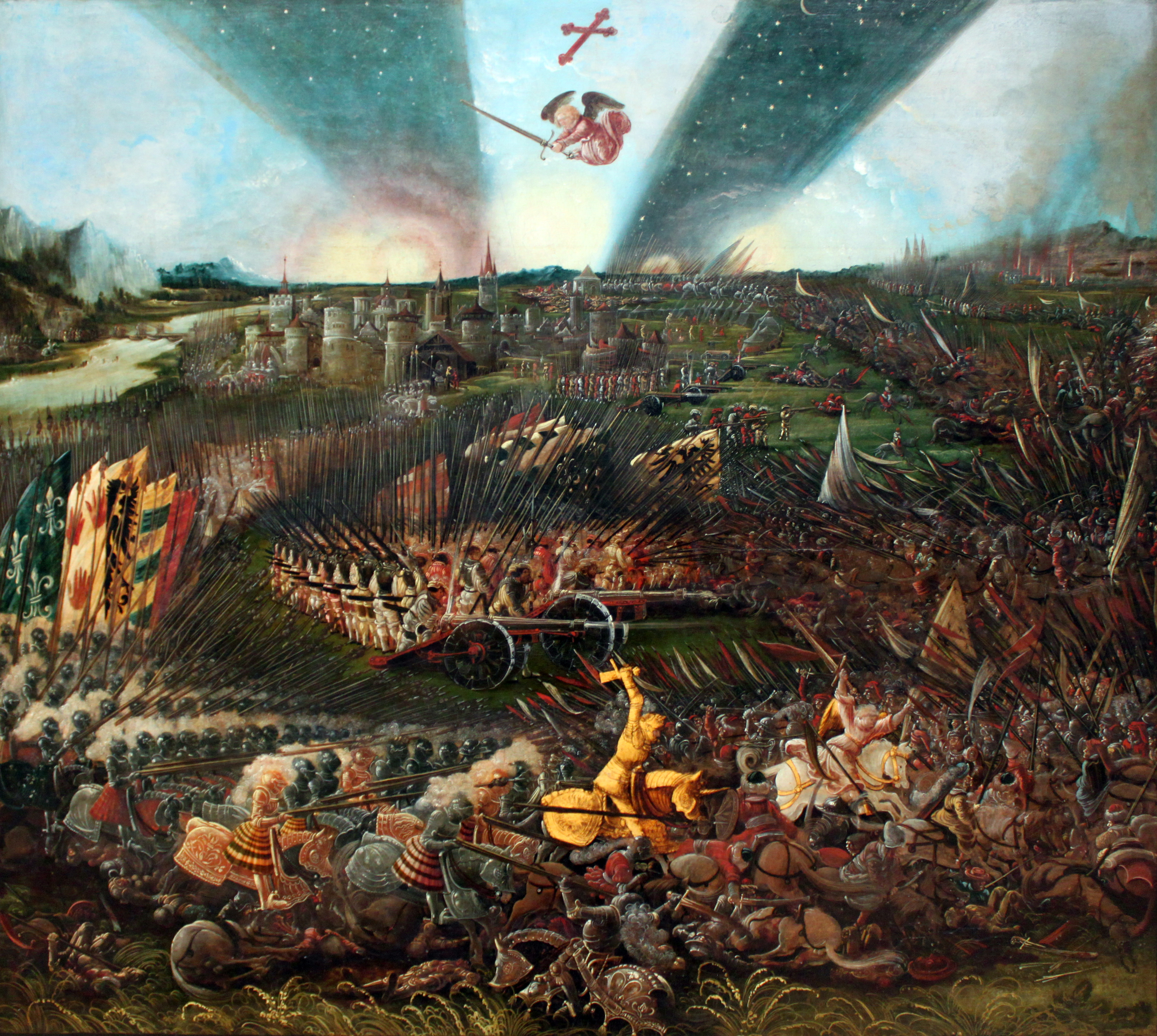
- Artist: Albrecht Altdorfer
- Year: 1518
- Medium: oil painting on linden wood panel
- Dimensions: 110.5 cm × 122 cm (43.5 in × 48 in)
- Location: Germanisches Nationalmuseum; Nuremberg

The Victory of Charlemagne over the Avars near Regensburg is a painting by German artist Albrecht Altdorfer, executed in 1518. This oil painting on linden wood panel is kept at the Germanisches Nationalmuseum, in Nuremberg.

== Description ==
The painting represents the triumph of Charlemagne in a battle over the Avars in the vicinity of Regensburg, which, according to the legend, lasted for three days and two nights. It depicts Charlemagne as an idealised Christian leader, fighting the pagans, and supported by an avenging angel, seen at the top of the painting. According to the legend that inspired the painting, the angel came for the help of Charlemagne, after hearing his prayers and those from his clergy, and revealed to him all the countries that he was meant to convert to Christianity. The set of the battle is in front of an idealised townscape. Altdorfer depicts a view of what the massive carnage of a 16th-century battle might have looked like, with typical warfare of the time.

In gratitude for the win, Charlemagne founded a monastery in Regensburg. In 1514 there was a conflict between the local bishop, the Holy Roman Emperor and the city council about the future of the monastery. The current painting was made during this dispute, being most likely a commission by the monastery and the city council.

== See also ==
- List of landscapes by Albrecht Altdorfer
