= The Martyrdom of Saint Florian =

Painting by Albrecht Altdorfer

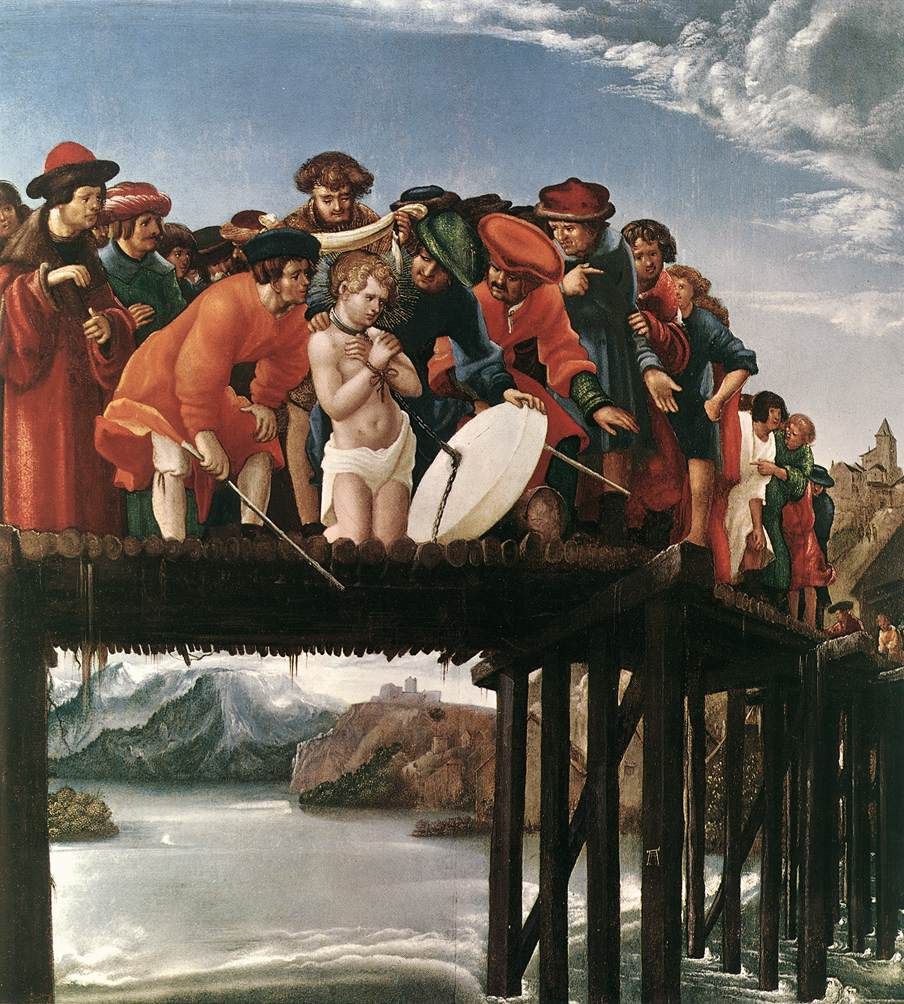
- Artist: Albrecht Altdorfer
- Year: c. 1518–1520
- Medium: oil on panel
- Dimensions: 76.4 cm × 67.2 cm (30.1 in × 26.5 in)
- Location: Uffizi Gallery, Florence

The Martyrdom of Saint Florian is an oil-on-panel painting executed c.1518–1520 by the German artist Albrecht Altdorfer, signed with his "A in A" monogram on a post of the bridge on the right. It and the artist's Saint Florian Taking Leave of the Monastery were in the Spannocchi collection of the Pinacoteca nazionale di Siena until 1914, when they were both transferred to their present home in the Uffizi in Florence to strengthen the latter's holdings on the Northern Renaissance.

== History ==
They originally formed part of a series of works by him on the life of the Austrian saint Florian, perhaps originally housed in a revolving frame – three others are now in the Germanisches Nationalmuseum in Nuremberg (Saint Florian Captured on the Bridge over the Enns, Saint Florian Before the Governor and The Recovery of Saint Florian's Body) along with one each in the National Gallery Prague (The Beating) and a private collection in Berlin. Together they probably resembled the Saint Sebastian and his Martyrdom Altarpiece painted by Altdorfer in Regensburg for Linz Collegiate Church around 1518 and may have hung in another church in Linz, perhaps that dedicated to Saint John.

== Description ==
Saint Florian was a Roman soldier from Enns, who, having defended the Christians of Upper Austria, in 304, was martyred by means of a grindstone tied around his neck and thrown with him into the river Inn.

Behind Florian, young, naked and kneeling, is the group of torturers and simple onlookers, and the large grindstone tied to his neck is in front of him. His serene acceptance of martyrdom contrasts with the excited and distorted faces of the other characters, which effectively bring out his sanctity. Below the bridge, a beautiful river landscape is depicted.

== See also ==
- List of landscapes by Albrecht Altdorfer
