= Augustin Hirschvogel =

16th-century German artist and cartographer

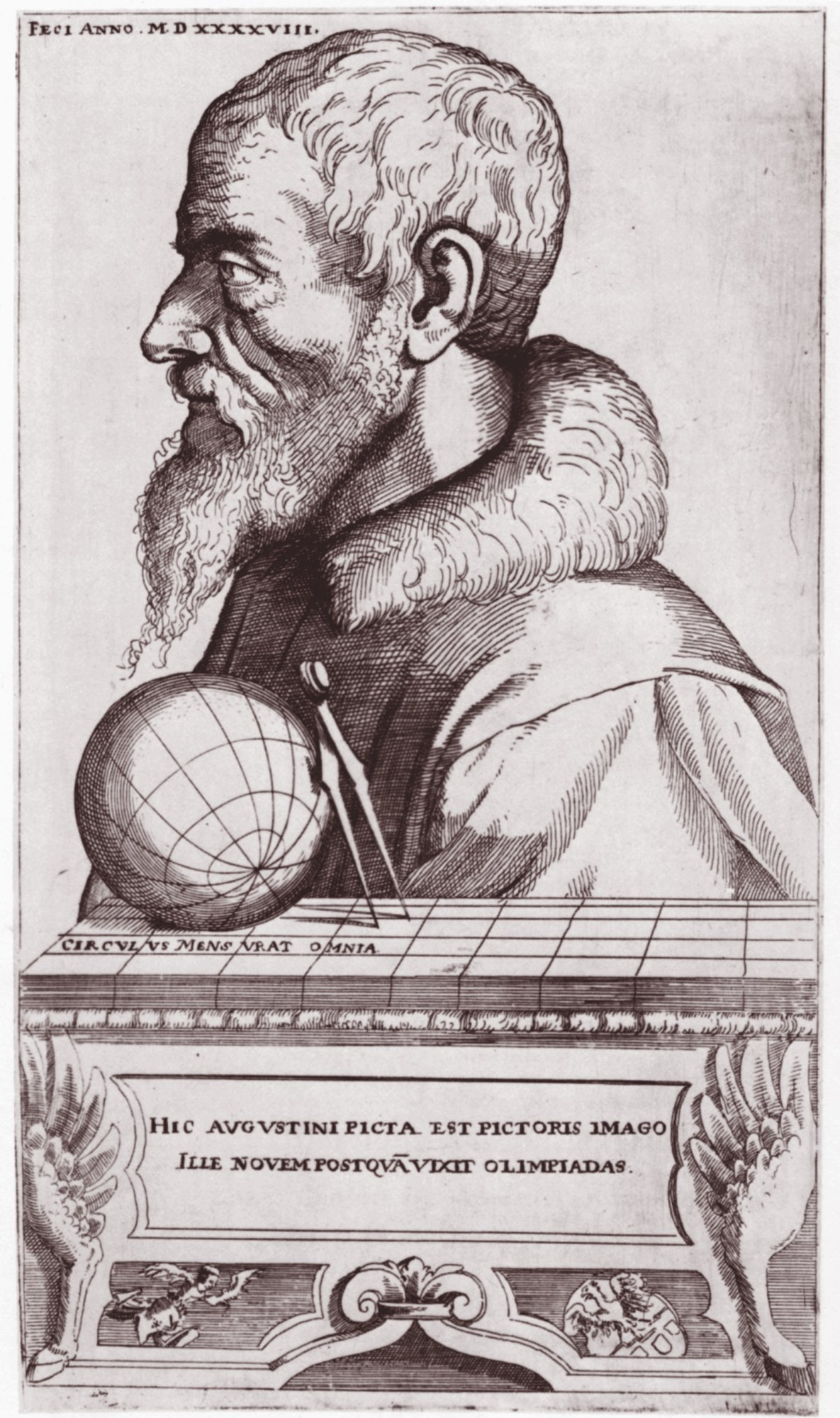
Self Portrait as Cartographer (1548)

Augustin Hirschvogel (1503 – February 1553) was a German artist, mathematician, and cartographer known primarily for his etchings. His thirty-five small landscape etchings, made between 1545 and 1549, assured him a place in the Danube School, a circle of artists in 16th-century Bavaria and Austria.

== Life ==
He began work in his birthplace, Nuremberg, where he was trained in glass painting by his father, Veit Hirschvogel the elder (1461–1525), who was the city's official stained glass painter. In 1525, Nuremberg accepted the Protestant Reformation, putting an end to lavish stained glass commissions. Veit the elder's workshop was then being run by Augustin's elder brother Veit; their father died the same year. The younger Hirschvogel had his own workshop by 1530, and soon formed a partnership with the potters Oswald Reinhart and Hanns Nickel.

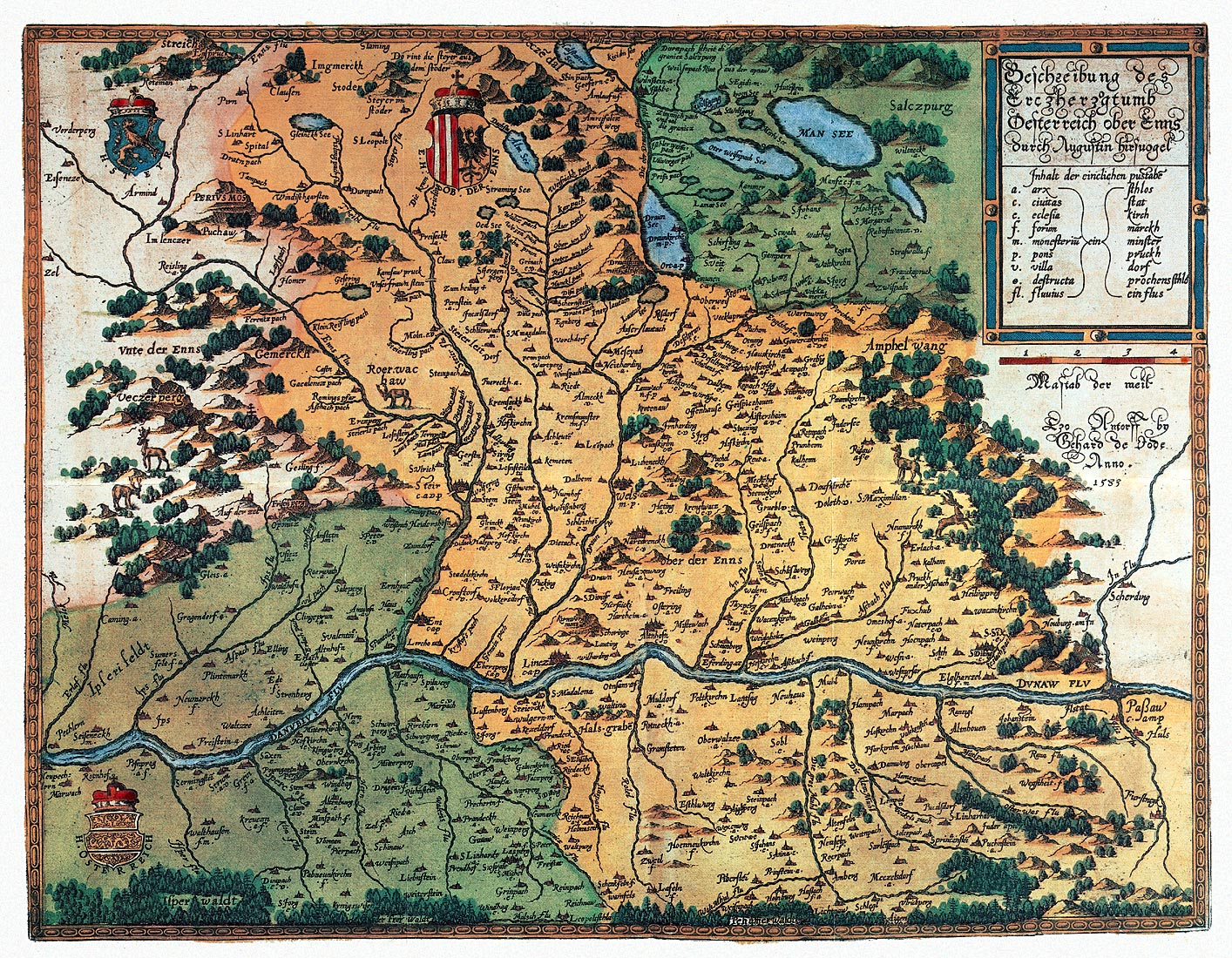
Map of Austria, 1542

Hirschvogel left in 1536 for Laibach (the German name for Ljubljana in present-day Slovenia), returning to Nuremberg in 1543. During this period he produced his earliest known work as a cartographer: maps of Turkish borders (1539) and of Austria (1542), the latter made for Ferdinand I. His commissions for armorials (for Franz Igelshofer and Christoph Khevenhüller) show that he had been in contact with the Imperial Court of Vienna by 1543.

With his move to Vienna in 1544, he rendered his services to the city, court, and citizenry. The city employed him in 1547 to develop designs for bastions, to create etched views of Vienna, and to produce a plan for the city following the Siege of Vienna. These views were the first ever rendered according to scale, and the circular city plan was the first ever produced by triangulation, a system of surveying that Hirschvogel developed. Vienna's council sent him to explain his work to Ferdinand I in Prague and to Charles V in Augsburg; Ferdinand granted him a pension of 100 florins for it.

He died in Vienna in 1553.

== Works ==
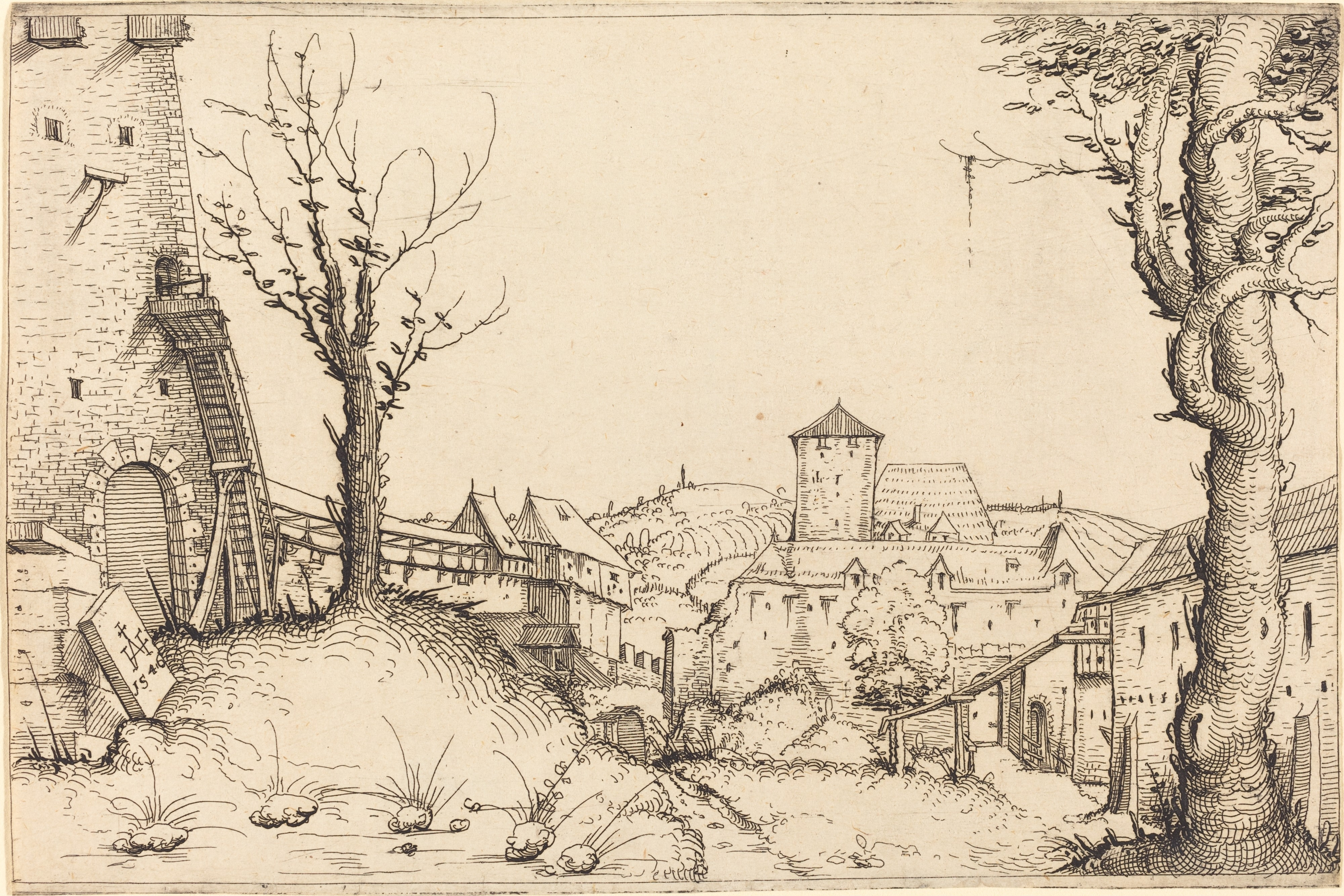
Castle yard, c. 1546. Etching, 140 × 213 mm, National Gallery of Art, Washington

Hirschvogel took up etching late in his career, and almost all of his prints date from the last decade of his life, when he resided in Vienna. His etchings, numbering about 300, "reflect his concern with Italianate problems of space, form, and ornament", and include portraiture, cartography, and book ornamentation. He was among the first etchers to use copper rather than iron plates. He contributed 23 etchings to Sigismund von Herberstein's 1549 edition of Rerum Moscoviticarum Commentarii (Notes on Muscovite Affairs), and more than 100 Old and New Testament illustrations for the verses of Hungarian reformer Péter Perényi (1502–48). A series of 53 hunting scenes for stained glass are of questionable authorship, but Peters asserts that they are by Hirschvogel. Hirschvogel is credited with the single authentic portrait of the Swiss physician Paracelsus, but this attribution is not certain.

His pen-and-ink landscapes have been described as "strong but light, sure but delicate". The lack of shadow in his landscapes contributes to a tranquil, idyllic mood. Almost 100 drawings are attributed to him; some are likely not his own, but are similar in style to his or Wolf Huber's work. His art shows the influence of Albrecht Dürer, Albrecht Altdorfer, Sebald Beham, Hans Burgkmair, and Agostino del Musi—some of whom had provided his father's workshop with designs.
