= Wolf Huber =

Austro-German painter, printmaker and architect

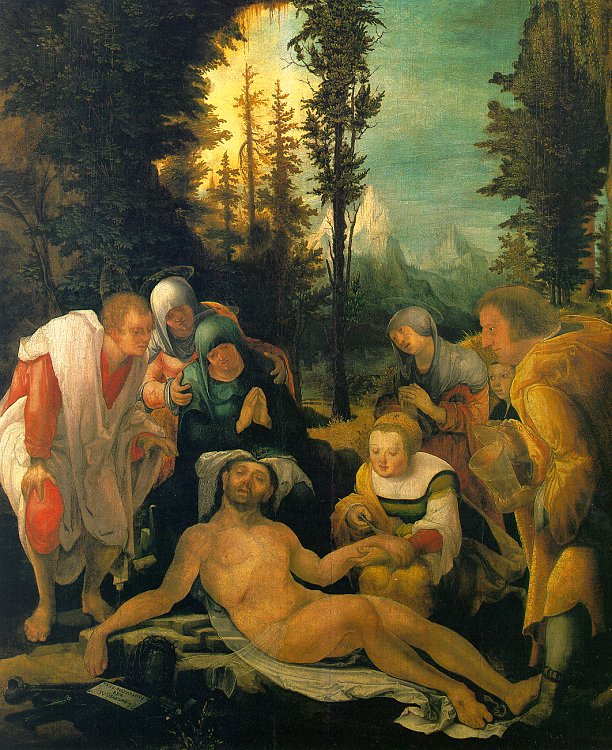
The Mourning of Christ (1524), by Wolf Huber.

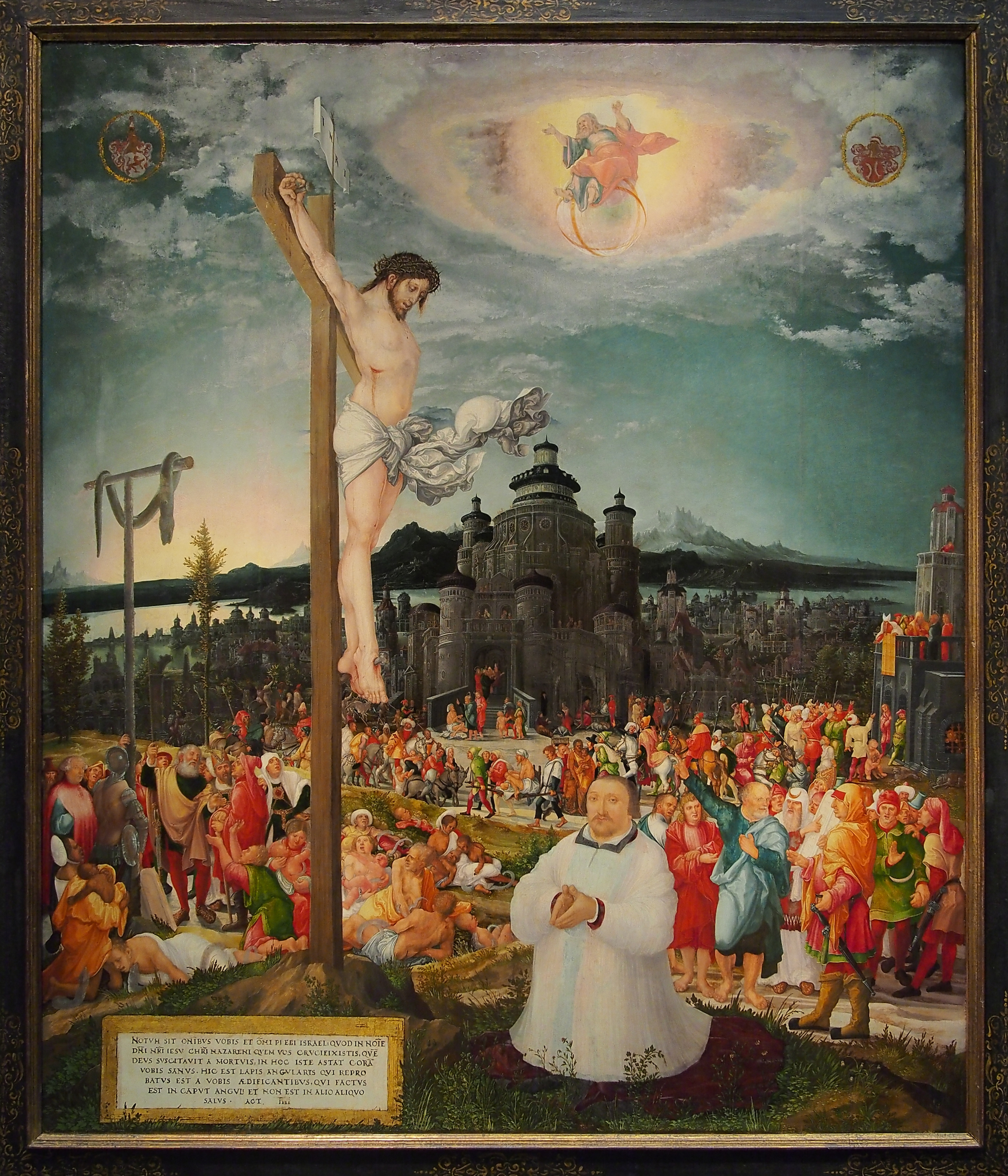
Allegory of Salvation (after 1543), Kunsthistorisches Museum

Wolf Huber (c. 1485 – 3 June 1553) was an Austrian- German painter, printmaker, and architect, who worked in Passau, Germany for most of his life as a leading member of the Danube school.

== Life ==
Records show that Huber was born in Feldkirch, Vorarlberg, but that by 1515, he was living in Passau. His relationship with other painters of that name living in Feldkirch is unknown, although it is widely believed that he was related to Hans Huber. Huber's birthdate has been estimated at around 1485 on the basis of several works, dated between 1510 and 1515, which show him to have been a well-established and mature artist by that date.

Nothing is known of Huber's training, although he likely worked in a family workshop before setting out as a journeyman painter. He likely visited northern Italy, as much of his work shows a thorough grounding in the stylistic techniques of the Italian Renaissance. Drawings of local subjects reveal that he visited the Salzkammergut at least once.

After his relocation to Passau, Huber in 1517 became court painter to the Duke of Bavaria, Ernst, who administered the local diocese until 1540. In 1529, another local nobleman, Count Niklas II von Salm, commissioned him to rebuild Neuberg Palace on the Inn River, not far from the town, only fragments of which survive. These indicate the addition of wings in the style of the Italian Renaissance, complete with rich decorative paintings. Huber probably also designed the reliefs on the tomb of the Count's father, Niklas I von Salm, now located in the Votivkirche in Vienna. For his work on the palace, Huber was awarded a pension and a manor house, Neufels.

When Count Wolfgang von Salm became Passau's bishop in 1542, he confirmed Huber's status as court painter, further recording that he was not subject to the laws of the guild of painters. The artist died in his manor house in Passau in 1553.

== Work ==
None of Huber's architectural work has survived, and few of his paintings are extant. Those paintings still in existence show a heavy influence from the work of Albrecht Dürer; some also show distinct Mannerist tendencies. Almost none of Huber's portraits survive, save for the pendants of mintmaster Anton Hundertpfund and his wife (dated 1526) and the unusual image of Jakob Ziegler (dated 1550), in which the scholar is presented frontally, before a panorama of the cosmos. Huber's surviving drawings suggest a number of multi-figured compositions, now lost; his known graphic output is limited to thirteen woodcuts.

Huber's drawings were copied from an early date; his landscapes in particular bear a deal of resemblance to similar works by Albrecht Altdorfer. He influenced his contemporary, the draughtsman Augustin Hirschvogel.
