= Danube school =

Group of Austrian and Bavarian painters

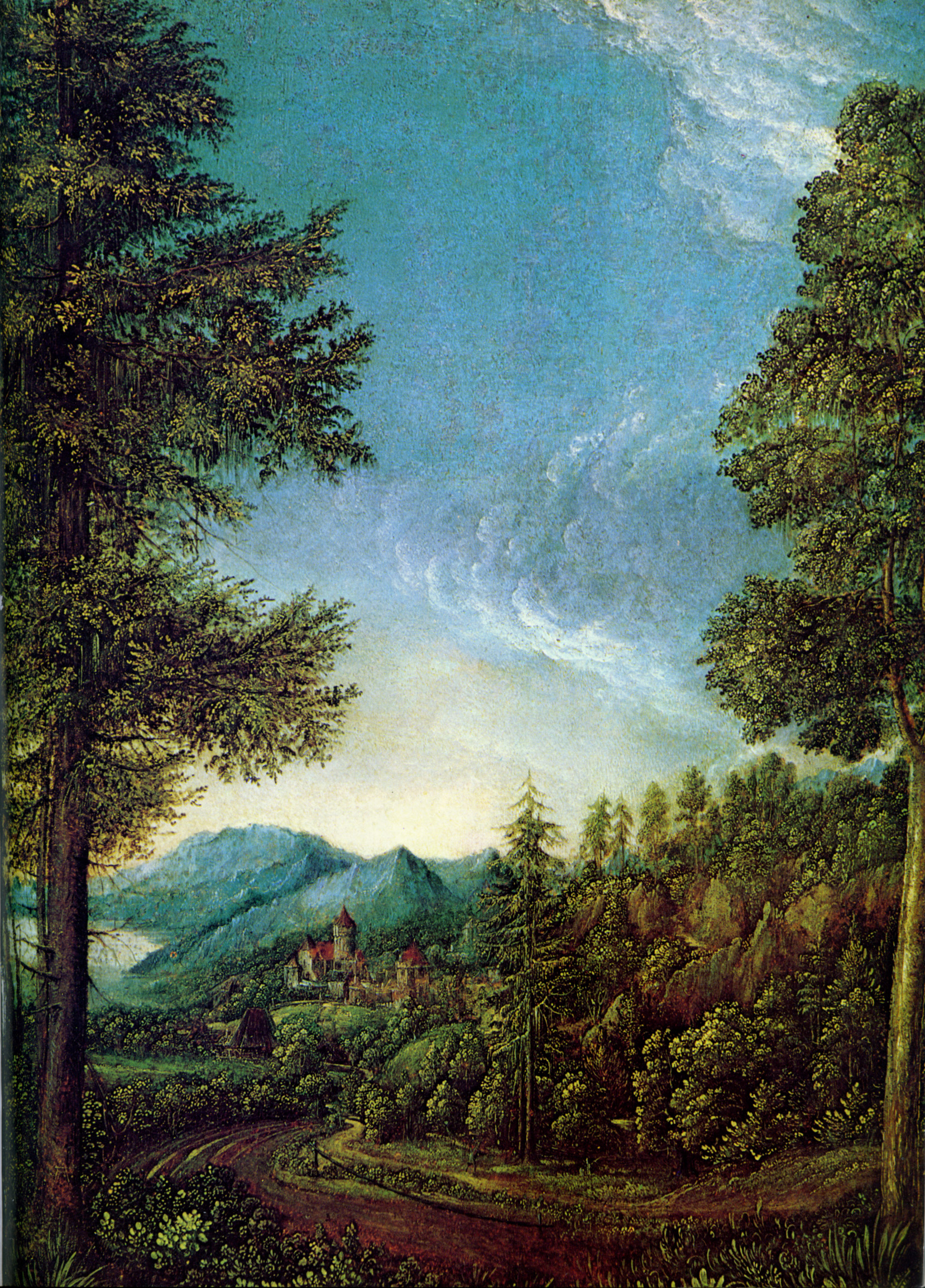
Danube landscape near Regensburg, by Albrecht Altdorfer

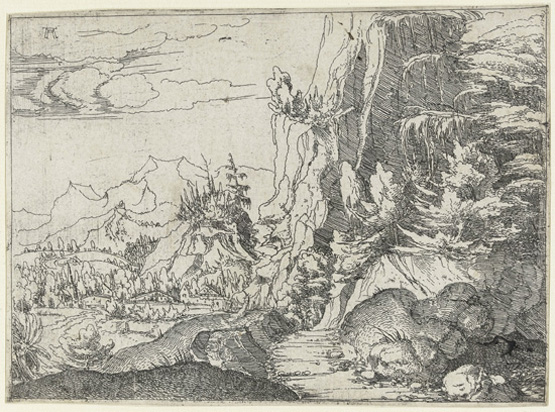
A landscape etching by Albrecht Altdorfer

The Danube school or Donau school (German: Donauschule or Donaustil) was a circle of painters of the first third of the 16th century in Bavaria and Austria (mainly along the Danube valley). Many were also innovative printmakers, usually in etching. They were among the first painters to regularly use pure landscape painting, and their figures, influenced by Matthias Grünewald, are often highly expressive, if not expressionist. They show little Italian influence and represent a decisive break with the high finish of Northern Renaissance painting, using a more painterly style that was in many ways ahead of its time.

According to Alfred Stange, Albrecht Altdorfer and Wolf Huber were two of the central most figures within the Danube school. Altdofer was the artist that created most of the artworks associated with the Danube school. The term "Danube school" was most likely not what these groups of artist called themselves but a name that derived hundreds of years after a man by the name of Theodore von Frimmel was observing a painting in 1892 in the Danube region around Regensburg, Germany. When artist Lucas Cranach's art work was recognized to have stylistic elements of the "Danube" the name "the Danube school" began to take a deeper meaning.

The river valleys of Austria and western Bavaria have often been praised as the land of the 'beautiful Danube' and not in just song but in the pictorial arts as well. (Snyder, James)

== Characteristics ==
Rugged mountain terrain, towering fir trees and dramatic lighting effects of sunset and dawn are the main characteristics of the Danube school. Other elements that distinguish Danube school artworks is the prominence of nature and how it is represented through these pieces of art as well as the human figure in these natural elements and human events that happen within nature.

== Notable artists ==
Of all the artists within the Danube school, Albrecht Altdorfer is one that has mastered the landscapes of the Danube. His painting, Danube Landscape has been dated between 1520 and 1525 which is a result from Altdorfer's mature years capturing the Danube landscapes.

Other members included:

- Wolf Huber
- Jörg Breu the Elder
- Rueland Frueauf the Younger
- Augustin Hirschvogel (draughtsman, printmaker)

Lucas Cranach the Elder had a major influence on the Danube school and is occasionally considered a member of the group.

== See also ==
- List of landscapes by Albrecht Altdorfer
- Early Renaissance painting
- Forlivese school of art
