= 927 Ratisbona =

Main-belt asteroid

Discovery
- Discovered by: M. F. Wolf
- Discovery site: Heidelberg Obs.
- Discovery date: 16 February 1920

Designations
- Pronunciation: /rætɪsˈboʊnə/
- Named after: Regensburg (German city)
- Alternative designations: A920 DB · 1920 GO; 1958 VD · 1958 XQ
- Minor planet category: main-belt · (outer) background

Orbital characteristics
- Epoch 31 May 2020 (JD 2459000.5)
- Uncertainty parameter 0
- Observation arc: 99.57 yr (36,368 d)
- Aphelion: 3.5095 AU
- Perihelion: 2.9476 AU
- Semi-major axis: 3.2285 AU
- Eccentricity: 0.0870
- Orbital period (sidereal): 5.80 yr (2,119 d)
- Mean anomaly: 88.007°
- Mean motion: 0° 10^{m} 11.64^{s} / day
- Inclination: 14.572°
- Longitude of ascending node: 7.6887°
- Argument of perihelion: 171.36°

Physical characteristics
- Mean diameter: 67.57±1.3 km; 75.892±0.187 km; 78.20±1.11 km
- Synodic rotation period: 12.986±0.003 h
- Geometric albedo: 0.044±0.002; 0.046±0.004; 0.0591±0.002
- Spectral type: Tholen = CB: B–V = 0.722±0.034; U–B = 0.401±0.036; V–R = 0.407±0.016
- Absolute magnitude (H): 9.3

927 Ratisbona is a large and dark background asteroid, approximately 76 kilometers (47 miles) in diameter, located in the outer region of the asteroid belt. It was discovered on 16 February 1920, by astronomer Max Wolf at the Heidelberg Observatory in southwest Germany. The carbonaceous C-type asteroid (CB) has a rotation period of 12.99 hours and is rather spherical in shape. It was named after the Bavarian city of Regensburg.

== Orbit and classification ==
Ratisbona is a non-family asteroid of the main belt's background population when applying the hierarchical clustering method to its proper orbital elements. It orbits the Sun in the outer asteroid belt at a distance of 2.9–3.5 AU once every 5 years and 10 months (2,119 days; semi-major axis of 3.23 AU). Its orbit has an eccentricity of 0.09 and an inclination of 15° with respect to the ecliptic. The body's observation arc begins at Heidelberg-Königstuhl State Observatory on 17 February 1920, the night after its official discovery observation.

== Naming ==
This minor planet was named after the Latin name of the German city of Regensburg in Bavaria, where astronomer Johannes Kepler died in 1630. The naming was mentioned in the astronomical journal Astronomische Nachrichten in 1930 (AN 240, 135).

== Physical characteristics ==
In the Tholen classification, Ratisbona is most similar to a common, carbonaceous C-type asteroid, and somewhat similar to a brighter B-type asteroid, based on a nosy spectrum (CB:).

=== Rotation period ===
Over the course of seven nights in January 2018, a rotational lightcurve of Ratisbona was obtained from photometric observations by Tom Polakis at the Command Module Observatory (V02) in Arizona. Lightcurve analysis gave a rotation period of 12.986±0.003 hours with a low brightness variation of 0.15±0.02 magnitude, indicative of a regular, spherical shape (U=3-). The result supersedes a period of 12.9938±0.0007 hours with an amplitude of 0.12±0.01 magnitude determined by René Roy, Raoul Behrend, Pierre Antonini and Donn Starkey in October 2004 (U=2).

=== Diameter and albedo ===
According to the survey carried out by the Infrared Astronomical Satellite IRAS, the NEOWISE mission of NASA's Wide-field Infrared Survey Explorer (WISE), and the Japanese Akari satellite, Ratisbona measures (67.57±1.3), (75.892±0.187) and (78.20±1.11) kilometers in diameter and its surface has a very low albedo of (0.0591±0.002), (0.046±0.004) and (0.044±0.002), respectively.

The Collaborative Asteroid Lightcurve Link adopts the results from IRAS, that is, a albedo of 0.0591 and a diameter of 67.57 km based on an absolute magnitude of 9.54. Further published mean-diameters and albedos by the WISE team include (73.204±1.485 km) and (84.872±1.352 km) and albedos of (0.050±0.011) and (0.0375±0.0027). An asteroid occultation, observed on 13 September 2014, gave a best-fit ellipse dimension of 78.0 × 78.0 kilometers. These timed observations are taken when the asteroid passes in front of a distant star. However the quality of the measurement is rated poorly.
