= List of landscapes by Albrecht Altdorfer =

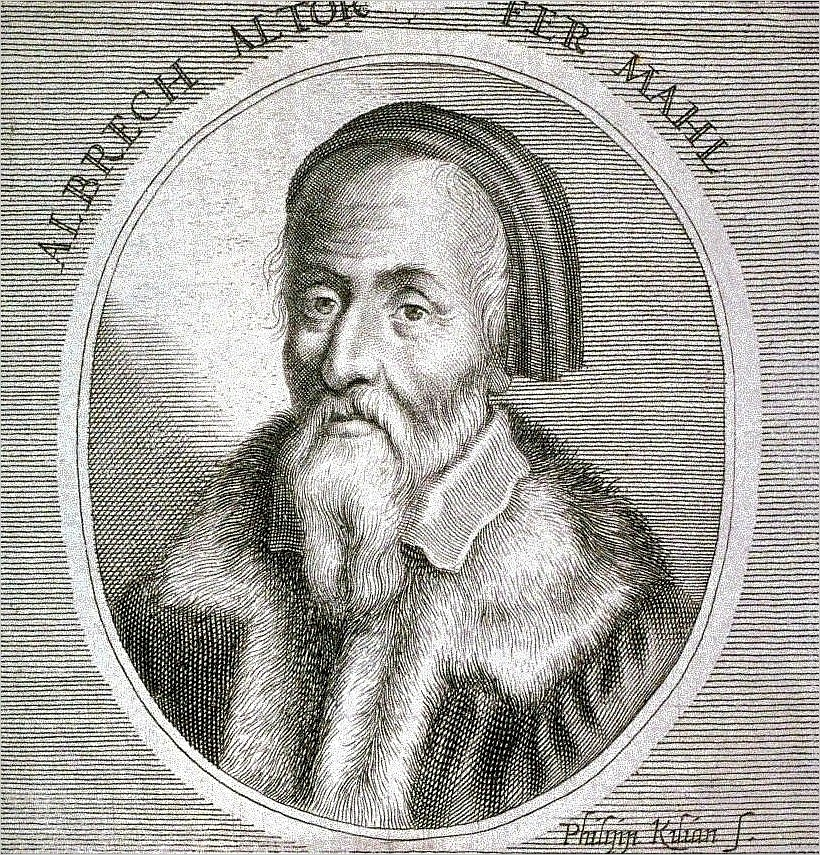
Portrait of Albrecht Altdorfer

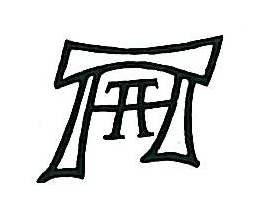
Monogram of Albrecht Altdorfer

This is a list of surviving pure landscapes by Albrecht Altdorfer (c. 1480–1538), German painter and printmaker who produced the first independent landscapes since antiquity.

== Paintings ==
Albrecht Altdorfer produced the very first pure landscapes in the history of European art.

Only five surviving landscape paintings are generally accepted to have been painted by Altdorfer. Two of them, one in Munich (30.5 × 22.2 cm) and one in London (41.2 × 35.5 cm), were painted in oils on parchment glued on wood. The other three, in Berlin, Erlangen, and Rotterdam, all just over 20 × 13 cm, were painted in watercolour and gouache on paper. All five are signed with Altdorfer's monogram AA (see below). The painting in Rotterdam is also dated 1522 by the artist.

Tokyo Fuji Art Museum owns an unsigned 53.1 × 45.1 cm oil-on-panel painting of a mountain range which it also attributes to Altdorfer.

| Painting | Title | Date | Medium | Size | Location | Notes |
|---|---|---|---|---|---|---|
| | Danube Landscape with Wörth Castle near Regensburg Danube Landscape near Regensberg | shortly after 1520 c. 1522 – c. 1525 | oil on parchment on beechwood | 30.5 × 22.2 cm | Alte Pinakothek, Munich, Germany | Inventory number: WAF30. The earliest landscape painting of a known place, the surroundings of the Wörth an der Donau Castle^{(de)} near Regensburg. Altdorfer also produced an engraving of the same locale. Signed with a monogram cut into the tree on the left: |
| | Landscape with a Footbridge | c. 1518 – c. 1520 | oil on vellum on wood | 41.2 × 35.5 cm | National Gallery, London | Inventory number: NG6320. Signed with a monogram in the upper-right corner: |
| | Landscape with a Spruce Landscape with Woodcutter | c. 1522 | pen, watercolour and gouache on paper | 20.1 × 13.6 cm | Kupferstichkabinett, Berlin, Germany | Inventory number: KdZ 11651. Signed with a monogram cut into the tree: |
| | Mountain landscape at sunset | c. 1522 | pen, watercolour and gouache on paper | 20.0 × 13.2 cm | Library of the University of Erlangen-Nuremberg, Erlangen, Germany | Inventory number: B 812; shelfmark: H62/B 812. Signed with a monogram in the upper part of the sky: |
| | Landscape with a Church | 1522 | painting on paper | 20.4 × 13.8 cm | Museum Boijmans Van Beuningen, Rotterdam, Netherlands | Dated and signed with a monogram, cut into the tree on the left: |
| | Mountain Range | c. 1530 | oil on panel | 53.1 × 45.1 cm | Tokyo Fuji Art Museum | Attributed to Altdorfer. |

== Etchings ==
Altdorfer's landscape etchings, of which nine are known, are the first European prints with such subject.

Of particular interest is a group of ten delicately hand-coloured impressions of the etchings (8 in Albertina, 1 in Veste Coburg, and 1 in the British Museum). These are thought to have been painted in the artist's studio, perhaps even by Altdorfer himself (it was, in fact, his father's trade). An additional hand-coloured impression of somewhat inferior quality survives in the Rijksmuseum.

All the etchings are signed with Altdorfer's monogram (see below).

| Etching | Hand-coloured | Title | Date | Size | Notes |
|---|---|---|---|---|---|
| | | The Large Spruce Large Fir; Landscape with a Large Pine | c. 1517 – c. 1520 c. 1520 – c. 1523 | 23.6 × 17.8 cm | Impression in: Fitzwilliam Museum, Cambridge, England (AD.5.22-122); Hand-coloured impressions in: Veste Coburg, Coburg, Germany (1, 99, 89); Albertina, Vienna, Austria (DG1926/1779); Signed with a monogram in the upper-left corner: |
| | | The Small Spruce | c. 1517 – c. 1520 | 15.9 × 11.7 cm | Impression in: British Museum, London, England (1867,0713.169); Hand-coloured impression in: Albertina, Vienna, Austria (DG1926/1778); Signed with a monogram on a tablet hanging from the tree: |
| | | Landscape with a Big Castle | c. 1517 – c. 1519 c. 1506 – c. 1522 | 10.8 × 14.9 cm | Impression in: Rijksmuseum, Amsterdam, Netherlands (RP-P-OB-2978); Hand-coloured impression in: Albertina, Vienna, Austria (DG1926/1780); Signed with a monogram in the sky: |
| | | Landscape with a Double Spruce Landscape with a Double Spruce in the Foreground | c. 1517 – c. 1520 c. 1521 – c. 1522 c. 1506 – c. 1522 | 11.0 × 16.2 cm | Impressions in: British Museum, London, England (1895,0617.5); Metropolitan Museum of Art, New York City, United States (1993.1097); Rijksmuseum, Amsterdam, Netherlands (RP-P-OB-2980); Hand-coloured impression in: Albertina, Vienna, Austria (DG1926/1782); Signed with a monogram in the sky: |
| | | Landscape with a City by the Lake | | | Signed with a monogram in the sky: |
| | | Landscape with a Spruce and Two Willows | | | Signed with a monogram in the sky: |
| | | Landscape with Two Spruces and a Castle | | | Signed with a monogram in a cloud: |
| | | Landscape with a Shaded Cliff | | | Signed with a monogram in the upper-left corner: |
| | | Landscape with a Water Mill | | | Signed with a monogram in the upper-left corner: |

== See also ==
- Albrecht Altdorfer
- Landscape painting
