= Prince Henry of Prussia (1747–1767) =

Prussian prince

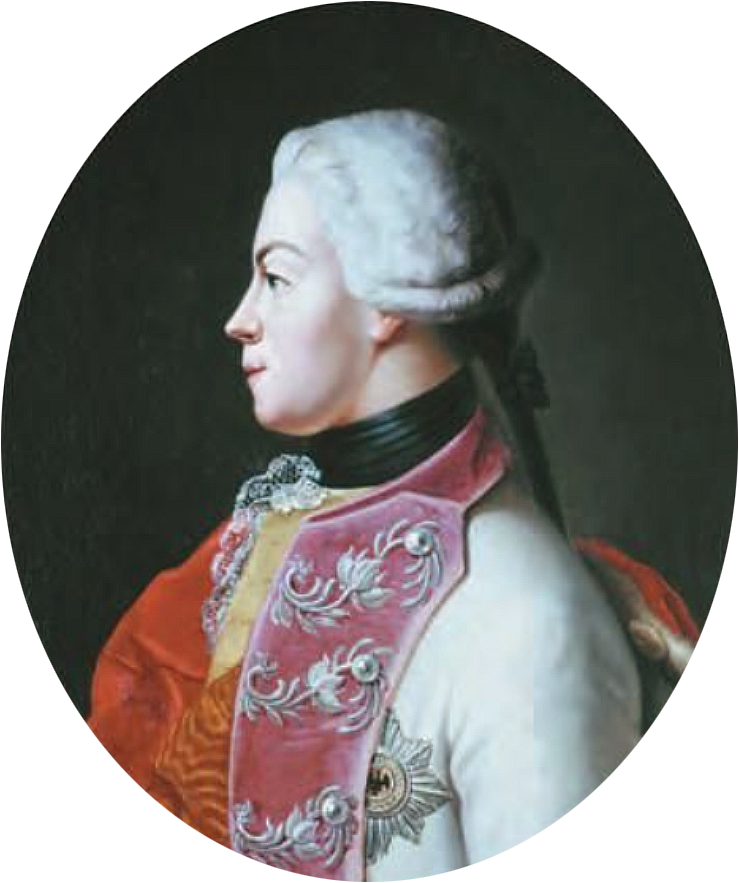
- Born: 30 December 1747
- Died: 26 May 1767 (aged 19)
Names
- Friedrich Heinrich Karl
- House: Hohenzollern
- Father: Prince Augustus William of Prussia
- Mother: Luise of Brunswick-Wolfenbuttel

Prince Frederick Henry Charles of Prussia (German: Friedrich Heinrich Karl, 30 December 1747 – 26 May 1767) was the second son of Prince Augustus William, the brother of Frederick the Great. His older brother was Frederick William II of Prussia.

== Biography ==
In his early life, the prince received several military promotions and honours; on 16 January 1748 he became a member of the Order of the Black Eagle, and on 20 September 1764 he became captain and company commander of the 1st Battalion Guard of the Gardes du Corps. In September 1764 he was made Colonel of the 2nd Cuirassier Regiment, and on 26 April 1767 he was promoted to Major General by Frederick II.

At the age of 17, Colonel Hans von Blumenthal, commander of the Gardes du Corps, became the prince's governor. As a result, he and his brother Frederick William spent much time at the Colonel's estate at Paretz.

Prince Henry was a promising young officer and his uncle the King had high hopes for him. However, in May 1767 he was leading his unit to Berlin for a parade and review when he stopped at the von Kleist estate of Protzen. Here he caught smallpox and died on the 26th, much to his uncle's grief.

== Ancestry ==
Ancestors of Prince Henry of Prussia (1747–1767)

8. Frederick I of Prussia
4. Frederick William I of Prussia
9. Princess Sophia Charlotte of Hanover
2. Prince Augustus William of Prussia
10. George I of Great Britain
5. Princess Sophia Dorothea of Hanover
11. Princess Sophia Dorothea of Celle
1. Prince Henry of Prussia
12. Ferdinand Albert I, Duke of Brunswick-Wolfenbüttel-Bevern
6. Ferdinand Albert II, Duke of Brunswick-Wolfenbüttel
13. Princess Christine of Hesse-Eschwege
3. Duchess Luise of Brunswick-Wolfenbüttel
14. Louis Rudolph, Duke of Brunswick-Wolfenbüttel
7. Duchess Antoinette of Brunswick-Wolfenbüttel
15. Princess Christine Louise of Oettingen-Oettingen
