= Wilhelmina of Prussia, Princess of Orange =

Princess of Orange from 1767 to 1806

Princess Wilhelmina of Prussia
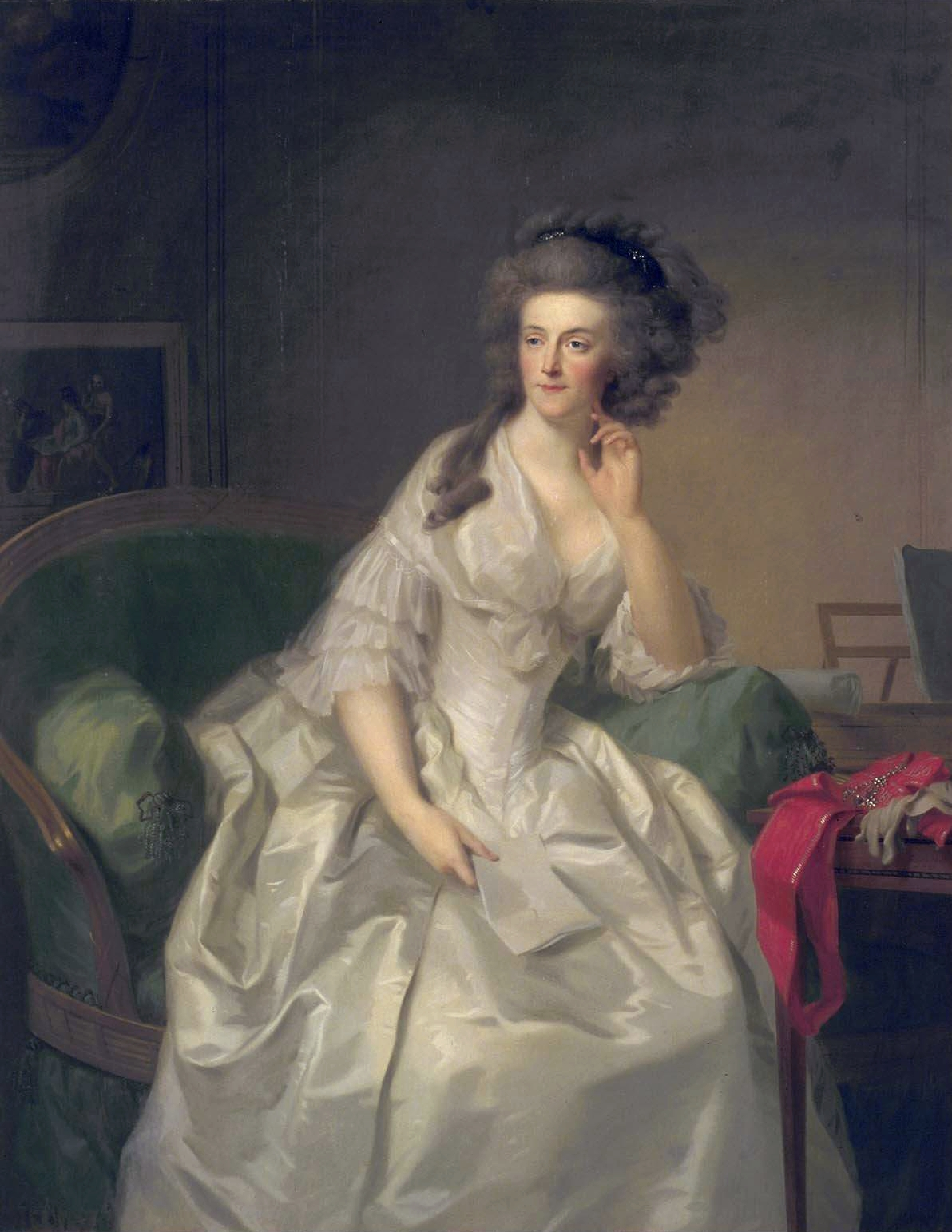
- Painting by Johann Friedrich August Tischbein (1789)

Princess consort of Orange
- Tenure: 4 October 1767 – 9 April 1806
- Born: 7 August 1751; Berlin
- Died: 9 June 1820 (aged 68); Het Loo Palace, Het Loo
- Spouse: William V, Prince of Orange (m. 1767; died 1806)
- Issue: Louise, Hereditary Princess of Brunswick-Wolfenbüttel; William I of the Netherlands; Prince Frederik
Names
- Friederike Sophie Wilhelmine
- House: Hohenzollern
- Father: Prince Augustus William of Prussia
- Mother: Duchess Luise of Brunswick-Wolfenbüttel

Princess Wilhelmina of Prussia (Frederika Sophia Wilhelmina; 7 August 1751 – 9 June 1820) was the consort of William V of Orange and the de facto leader of the dynastic party and counter-revolution in the Netherlands. She was the daughter of Prince Augustus William of Prussia and Duchess Luise of Brunswick-Wolfenbüttel. Wilhelmina was the longest-serving princess consort of Orange.

== Background ==
Wilhelmina was brought up by her grandmother. On 4 October 1767 in Berlin, she was married to William V of Orange, the last Dutch Stadtholder. Duke Louis Ernest was instrumental in arranging the marriage of Prince William V with his niece. He immediately observed that the princess craved joint rule, and so was starting to undermine Louis Ernest's dominant position. In long letters she complained about him to her other uncle, King Frederick II of Prussia. As a person, she was proud and politically ambitious; as a princess consort, she dominated her spouse and exerted both overt and covert influence on the politics of state.

== The revolution ==
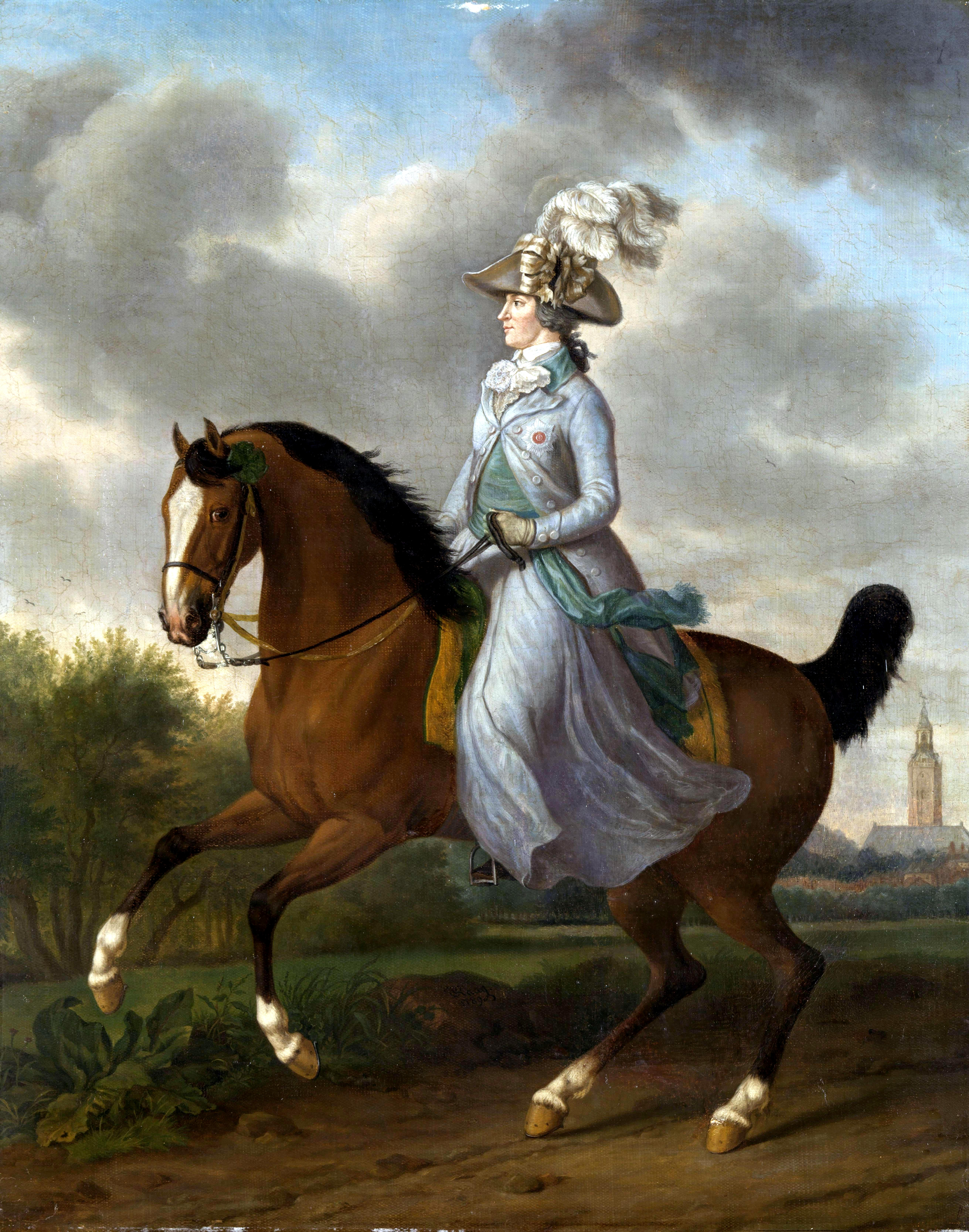
Equestrian portrait of Wilhelmina by Tethart Philipp Christian Haag hangs in the Rijksmuseum in Amsterdam.

She was deeply involved in the revolutionary political conflict in the Netherlands from 1781 onwards – not only a supporter and partner, but as a main driving power behind the party of her spouse. She disliked her uncle Duke Louis Ernest of Brunswick-Lüneburg, Captain-General of the Netherlands. From 1782 she was recognized openly as the true leader of the dynastic Stadtholder party, a role its followers actively encouraged her to take. She was in heavy correspondence with foreign powers and used foreign supporters to influence Dutch internal policy. In 1785, her spouse was forced to leave the Hague and put under a demand to abdicate. Wilhelmina persuaded William not to give in, and subsequently went to Friesland – officially to visit a jubilee, but in reality she aimed to gain support in the ongoing political conflict. In 1786, the family moved from the capital at the Hague to Nijmegen. After the revolution proper broke out in 1787 and William had moved his court to Guelders, she attempted to return to the Hague; on 28 June 1787, she was stopped at Goejanverwellesluis, waiting for permission to continue to her destination; she went back to William after two days as permission was denied.

Both Wilhelmina and her brother, King Frederick William II of Prussia perceived the occurrences as an insult. A request to the States to apologize led to two ultimatums, the first on 6 August and the second starting on 10 September. Then Wilhelmina asked her brother for a military intervention. Frederick, despite having been in power for only a year, attacked the Dutch Republic on 13 September 1787. William was restored to power two weeks later and many rebels fled to Pas de Calais (France), and Brussels in early October. At the end of the year, the princess demanded the replacement of a large number of regents.

== Exile and later life ==
However, the Dutch patriots returned in 1795, with support from the French, and William fled to his ally, his cousin King George III of Great Britain. During their exile, the couple lived in Kew until 1802, and subsequently went to Germany, where they lived in Nassau and Braunschweig (where William died in 1806). Thereafter, Wilhelmina and her daughter – both having been widowed in 1806 – lived together at various places in the Confederation of the Rhine, Weimar, Oranienburg and Berlin.

William, the son of William V and Wilhelmina, went with them into exile, but returned to the Netherlands in 1813 to become King William I of the Netherlands, the founder of the present Dutch monarchy. Wilhelmina and her daughter returned to the Netherlands in 1814 and settled in Villa Welgelegen. She received Tsar Alexander I of Russia in Haarlem in 1815.

== Death ==
On 9 June 1820, Wilhelmina died at Het Loo at 68 years old. The Princess Mother was buried at Church of Apeldoorn. On 27 November 1822, she was reburied at Royal Crypt.

== Children ==
Wilhelmina and William V of Orange were parents to five children:

- An unnamed son (23 – 24 March 1769)
- Frederika Luise Wilhelmina (28 November 1770 in The Hague – 15 October 1819 in The Hague), married in The Hague on 14 October 1790 to Karl, Hereditary Prince of Brunswick (1766–1806), a son of Karl Wilhelm Ferdinand, Duke of Brunswick-Luneburg and Princess Augusta of Great Britain, without issue.
- An unnamed son (born and deceased on 6 August 1771)
- William I, King of the Netherlands (24 August 1772 – 12 December 1843)
- Willem Georg Frederik, Prince of Orange-Nassau (15 February 1774 The Hague – 6 January 1799 in Padua), unmarried and without issue.

== Ancestry ==
Ancestors of Wilhelmina of Prussia, Princess of Orange

8. Frederick I of Prussia
4. Frederick William I of Prussia
9. Princess Sophia Charlotte of Hanover
2. Prince Augustus William of Prussia
10. George I of Great Britain
5. Princess Sophia Dorothea of Hanover
11. Princess Sophia Dorothea of Celle
1. Princess Wilhelmina of Prussia
12. Ferdinand Albert I, Duke of Brunswick-Wolfenbüttel-Bevern
6. Ferdinand Albert II, Duke of Brunswick-Wolfenbüttel
13. Princess Christine of Hesse-Eschwege
3. Duchess Luise of Brunswick-Wolfenbüttel
14. Louis Rudolph, Duke of Brunswick-Wolfenbüttel
7. Duchess Antoinette of Brunswick-Wolfenbüttel
15. Princess Christine Louise of Oettingen-Oettingen

Wilhelmina of Prussia, Princess of Orange House of Hohenzollern Born: 7 August 1751 Died: 9 June 1820
Dutch royalty
Vacant Title last held by Anne, Princess Royal	Princess consort of Orange; 1767–1806	Succeeded by Wilhelmine of Prussia
