= Duke Louis Ernest of Brunswick-Lüneburg =

German-Dutch nobleman and soldier

Louis Ernest of Brunswick-Lüneburg-Bevern
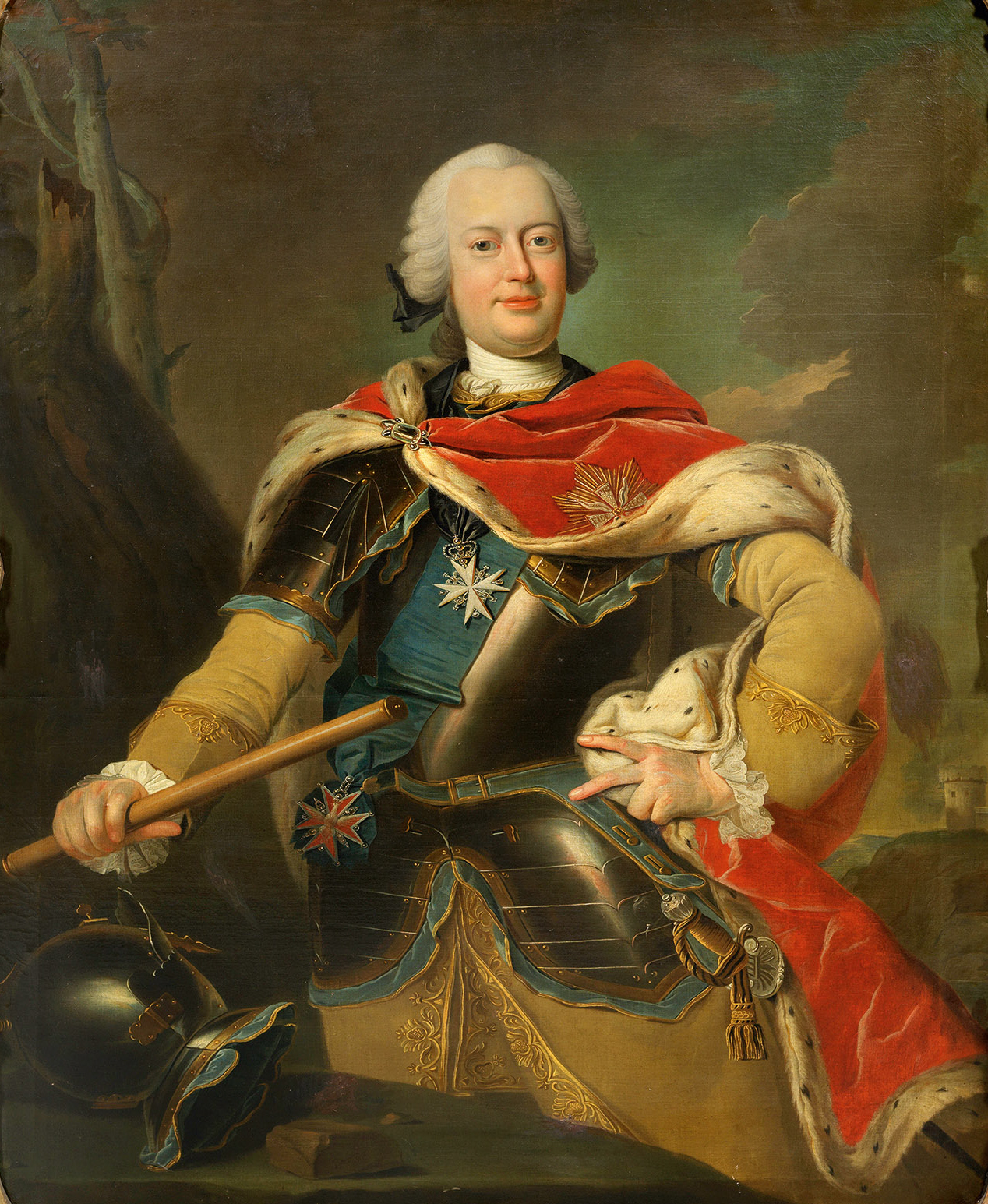
- Portrait by Johann Heinrich Tischbein
- Born: 25 September 1718; Wolfenbüttel
- Died: 12 May 1788 (aged 69); Eisenach
- Relatives: Ferdinand Albert II of Brunswick-Lüneburg (father); Anton Ulrich of Brunswick-Lüneburg (brother); Ivan VI of Russia (nephew); Charles William Ferdinand of Brunswick (nephew)
- Military career
- Allegiance: Holy Roman Empire; Dutch Republic
- Branch: Army
- Service years: 1737–1784
- Rank: Field marshal Captain-general
- Commands: Alt-Wolfenbüttel Infantry Regiment, Dutch States Army
- Conflicts: Ottoman Wars, Second Silesian War, War of the Austrian Succession, Battle of Soor, Battle of Roucoux, Battle of Lauffeldt

Louis Ernest of Brunswick-Lüneburg-Bevern (25 September 1718, Wolfenbüttel – 12 May 1788, Eisenach) was a field-marshal in the armies of the Holy Roman Empire and the Dutch Republic, the elected Duke of Courland (1741). From 13 November 1750 to 1766 he was the Captain-General of the Netherlands, where he was known as the Duke of Brunswick or (to distinguish him from his eldest brother Charles, who succeeded to their father's title of Duke of Brunswick-Lüneburg) Duke of Brunswick-Wolfenbüttel. Another brother was Duke Ferdinand of Brunswick who led the Allied Anglo-German army during the Seven Years' War.

== Family ==
He was the third son of Ferdinand Albert II, Duke of Brunswick-Lüneburg, and Antoinette Amalie of Brunswick. He had family ties with various European royal houses. Louis's eldest sister was the wife of Frederick the Great of Prussia; another sister was married to the brother of Frederick the Great and her son would inherit the Prussian crown. A third sister was married to Ernest Frederick, Duke of Saxe-Coburg-Saalfeld and would have illustrious progeny, including Leopold I of Belgium (grandson), Queen Victoria, Albert, Prince Consort and Empress Carlota of Mexico (great-granddaughter). A fourth sister, Juliana Maria married King Frederick V of Denmark in 1752. Louis's brother Anthony Ulrich was married to Anna Leopoldovna, a Russian princess and niece of Empress Anna. Their son Ivan – Louis' nephew – was appointed Emperor of Russia on his birth, but was deposed only months later.

Nor was this all. Empress Maria Theresa of Austria was Louis's first cousin (their mothers were sisters). Wilhelmina of Prussia, Princess of Orange was his niece (her mother was Louis's sister Louise Amalie). In addition, Wilhelmina's daughter Louise, married Charles George August, a grandson of Louis's own brother Charles. Later, in 1764, Louis's nephew Charles William Ferdinand, Duke of Brunswick-Wolfenbüttel (son of his eldest brother) would marry Augusta, eldest sister of George III of Great Britain. Rarely were royal houses so interrelated other as in his case, and this factor was probably the main reason for his supporting the Dutch policy of neutrality during the Seven Years' War.

In the year 1737, Louis entered the imperial military as Oberst and commander of the Alt-Wolfenbüttel infantry regiments. He took part in the Ottoman Wars from September 1739 until the Treaty of Belgrade. He entered the Netherlands in May 1740 as an Austrian major-general.

== Duke of Courland ==
After the arrest of the duke of Courland, Ludwig was elected his successor on 27 June 1741 with the support of his cousin Maria Theresa of Austria. He then went to Saint Petersburg, and seems to have been interested in marriage with Elizabeth of Russia in the hope to become emperor. However, upon Elizabeth's palace coup on 6 December 1741, his nephew Ivan and all of Ivan's German advisers lost their positions, resulting in their exile, imprisonment or departure. Louis Ernest lost his Dukedom of Courland due to the coup and returned to Germany in 1742.

== War of the Austrian Succession ==
He took part in the Second Silesian War from 1744 as an Austrian field-marshal and therefore fought against his brothers and many of his other relatives, who mostly took the side of Prussia. In the battle of Soor on 30 September 1745, he was seriously wounded, but seems to have appeared on the military scene in the Netherlands as early as the spring of 1746. On 11 October 1746, during the War of the Austrian Succession, he took part in the battle of Rocoux against France. In the following year, he fought in the battle of Lauffeld as Feldzeugmeister or supreme artillery commander, and met stadtholder William IV, Prince of Orange, then involved in border battles against France.

== Regent of the Netherlands ==
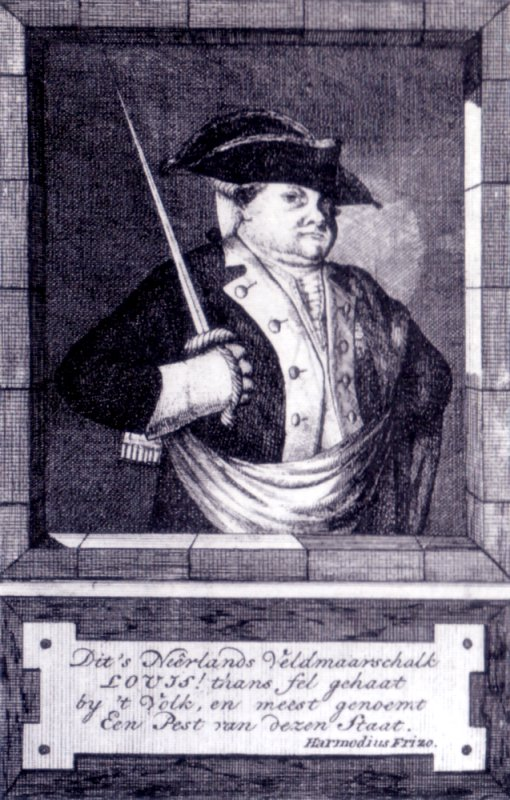
Dutch caricature of the Duke

In 1749 he entered the Dutch States Army as field marshal by request of William IV, for 20,000 guilders per annum, although he also retained his position as an Austrian field-marshal and Protestant Generalfeldzeugmeister of the Holy Roman Empire. William's wife Anne was initially sceptical about his appointment and opposed it.

In 1751 he became the governor of the garrison city of 's-Hertogenbosch, where the stadtholder had had particular influence since 1629. After the death of William IV on 22 October 1751 and Anne's appointment as regent, Louis Ernest was appointed captain-general (commander-in-chief) of the Netherlands, reorganising the higher strata of the army. Britain and Prussia asked him to command the allied armies in the Seven Years' War, but Louis Ernest refused out of respect for the Dutch Republic's neutrality. His brother Duke Ferdinand was given command of the Anglo-German army in Hanover in 1757. In 1759 Louis was used as an intermediary in an attempt to mediate the conflict, but plans for a peace congress came to nothing.

From the death of William V's mother Anne in 1759 to William's majority in 1766, he was William's guardian and led the Netherlands' state affairs in his name. The prince called Louis Ernest his second father, but the Frisian nobility under Onno Zwier van Haren opposed Louis Ernest. Simultaneously, Louis Ernest began reforming the stadtholder system that had previously appointed qualified persons to the regions in reward for their loyalty. Such favorites had been supposed to take care of local disputes independently. As a result, there was no efficient administrative device in the Republic, nor an equitable apportioning of offices. The prince, losing himself in the details, made it known that he valued advice, which, however, he usually sent back by return of post without any alterations. For over a dozen years he had been drilled by Brunswick and the Orangist politician Greffier Fagel, to believe that his only job was to sign the documents they placed in front of him. He was probably one of the first victims of the media in Dutch history.

== William's coming of age ==
After 1766, the Duke was kept on at the irresolute William's request as his privy councillor and as a Dutch field-marshal, with the object, it is thought by some, to keep William's older sister Carolina in check. The Acte van Consulentschap (Act of Advisorship) had been set up in secret by the Grand Pensionary, Pieter van Bleiswijk, and under this Act Ludwig was to furnish advice by request only. Earlier plans to put in place an advisory council were thus frustrated and in addition, several jealous Dutch noblemen were passed over in favour of the Duke.

Louis Ernest was instrumental in arranging the marriage of Prince William V with the Duke's niece, Princess Wilhelmina of Prussia. He immediately observed that the princess craved joint rule, and so was starting to undermine Louis Ernest's dominant position. In long letters she complained about Louis Ernest to her uncle, King Frederick II of Prussia.

== Problems and exile ==
Louis Ernest's accumulated positions and tangled interests led to problems. As early as 1771 there was talk of an attempt on his life in the Hague, but the bullet fired at him passed between his widespread legs, allegedly impacting his genitals. Pieter Paulus in 1773 gained national recognition through his book about the stadtholder system, in which he blamed the Duke of Brunswick for the abuses of that system. In December 1780 Great Britain declared war on the Republic. The war went badly for the Dutch and many blamed the Duke. The opposition against the stadtholderian system would rise to a crescendo during the Patriottentijd (named after the political faction that opposed the stadtholder). But even his partisans knew that things had to change for the better. The Amsterdam burgemeester Joachim Rendorp pleaded for an advisory council for the prince.

The anti-stadtholder party, which gave him the nickname of "the Bulky Duke" (consistent with Frederick the Great's habit of calling him "Fat Louis") recognised the decline of the fleet, the growing importance of the Dutch States Army, the outbreak of the Fourth Anglo-Dutch War and the loss of the Barrier Treaty towns in the Austrian Netherlands, and apportioned the blame for all these to Louis Ernest first and foremost. The Patriots argued that Louis Ernest had outrageously neglected the education of the stadtholder, so that the stadtholder was now unable to take decisions on his own. It would be better if he would leave the country. On 24 May 1782, the duke voluntarily left the Hague and retreated to the Gouvernementshuis in 's-Hertogenbosch.

The disputes with Austrian Emperor Joseph II (another relative of the Duke), reopened an earlier argument over the Barrier towns, the closure of the Scheldt to shipping on Antwerp, and free trade on the Dutch East Indies. Louis Ernest was mistrusted due to his family ties with the emperor and accused of high treason and of selling out on the fortress city of Maastricht. In the Patriot magazine De Post van den Neder-Rhijn, the Acte of Consulentschap was made public. Because of the ensuing scandal, on 14 October 1784, Louis Ernest resigned all his offices and left 's-Hertogenbosch to its new governor, Robert Douglas. The Kettle War was seen by the Patriots as the emperor's revenge.

== Exile ==
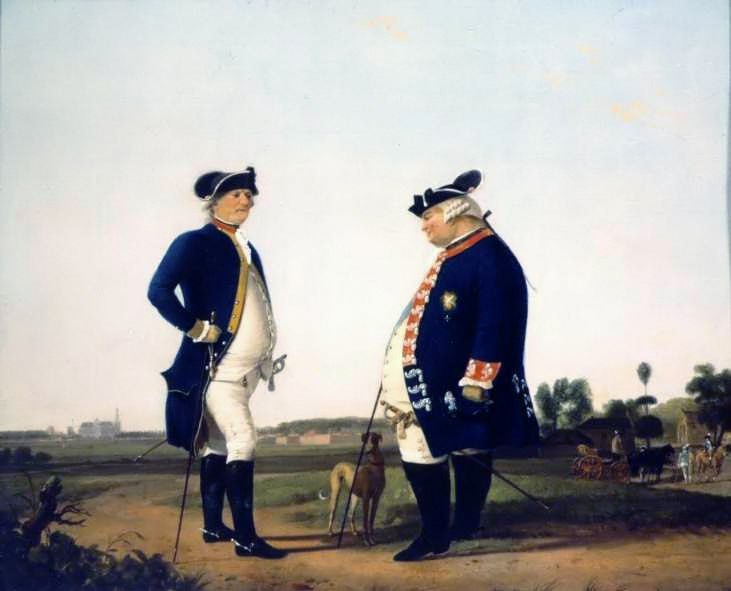
Ludwig, right, with his Scottish-born successor Robert Douglas, painted in 1786 by Jacobus Vrijmoet

In 1785, the duke lived in Aachen for a short time. The patriots tried to get hold of his correspondence, using both intrigue and force. Throughout Europe, the nobility came under heavy criticism, and some of the Patriots (anticipating the fate of the nobility and its privileges) followed suit, making public all records relating to the duke so as to broadcast news of his fall right across the continent. The patriots were also energetic that year in organizing provincial armies and exercising free corps and exercitiegenootschappen (military societies) with democratically chosen officers, leading to the first democratically elected city government in the city Utrecht, but also to the occupation of Elburg and Hattem by the Stadtholderian troops in September 1786.

Louis Ernest stayed in Eisenach from 1786, where, with the help of August Ludwig von Schlözer, he wrote his Autobiography and its sequel, his Defence. Both works were soon translated from their original German into Dutch. He was in close contact with the court at Weimar, especially with his niece, Duchess Anna Amalia, and with Duke Charles August. Louis Ernest's nephew, the Duke of Brunswick-Wolfenbüttel, occupied the Dutch Republic on 13 September 1787, forcing many Patriots to flee the country.

Louis Ernest died in Eisenach in 1788 and was buried in the Welf family vault in Brunswick Cathedral. His diaries, written by his secretary, the 180 pamphlets and publications in the Niedersächsisches Staatsarchiv in Wolfenbüttel, are studied.

== Ancestry ==
Ancestors of Duke Louis Ernest of Brunswick-Lüneburg

16. Henry III of Brunswick-Lüneburg
8. Augustus the Younger, Duke of Brunswick-Lüneburg (=24)
17. Ursula of Saxe-Lauenburg
4. Ferdinand Albert I, Duke of Brunswick-Lüneburg
18. John Albert II, Duke of Mecklenburg-Gustrow
9. Elisabeth Sophie of Mecklenburg-Gustrow (=25)
19. Elisabeth Sophia of Mecklenburg-Gustrow
2. Ferdinand Albert II, Duke of Brunswick-Lüneburg
20. Maurice, Landgrave of Hesse-Kassel
10. Frederick, Landgrave of Hesse-Eschwege
21. Juliane of Nassau-Siegen
5. Christina Wilhelmina of Hesse-Eschwege
22. John Casimir, Count Palatine of Kleeburg
11. Countess Palatine Eleonora Catherine of Zweibrücken
23. Catherine of Sweden
1. Duke Louis Ernest of Brunswick-Lüneburg
24. Augustus the Younger, Duke of Brunswick-Lüneburg (=8)
12. Anthony Ulrich, Duke of Brunswick-Wolfenbüttel
25. Dorothea of Anhalt-Zerbst
6. Louis Rudolph, Duke of Brunswick-Lüneburg
26. Frederick, Duke of Schleswig-Holstein-Sønderburg-Norburg
13. Elisabeth Juliana Schleswig-Holstein-Sønderborg-Nordborg
27. Eleanor of Anhalt-Zerbst
3. Antoinette of Brunswick-Wolfenbüttel
28. Joachim Ernest of Oettingen-Oettingen
14. Albert Ernest I of Oettingen-Oettingen
29. Anna Dorothea of Hohenlohe-Neuenstein
7. Princess Christine Louise of Oettingen-Oettingen
30. Eberhard III, Duke of Württemberg
15. Christine Friederike of Württemberg
31. Anna Catherine of Salm-Kyrburg

Regnal titles
Preceded by Ernst Johann von Biron	Duke of Courland; 27 June–6 December 1741	Succeeded by Council of the Duke

== Bibliography ==
- Römer, C. (1997). Braunschweig-Bevern: Ein Fürstenhaus als europäische Dynastie 1667–1884 (in German). Braunschweig. p. 68. ISBN 3927939382.
