= Duke Ferdinand of Brunswick-Wolfenbüttel =

German military officer (1721–1792)

Ferdinand of Brunswick-Wolfenbüttel
- Duke of Brunswick-Wolfenbüttel
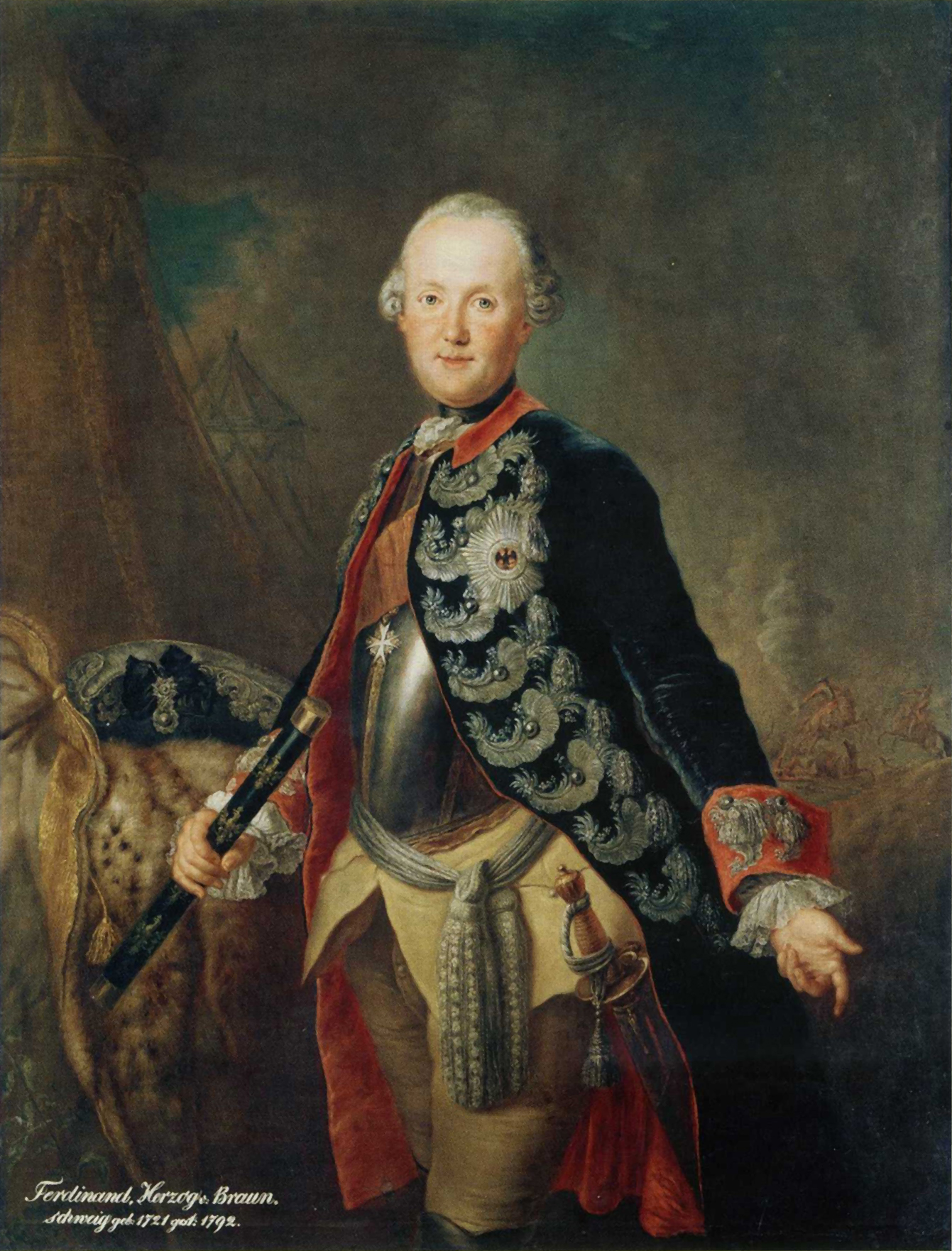
- Portrait by Falbe, c. 1745–1750
- Born: Ferdinand von Braunschweig-Wolfenbüttel; 12 January 1721; Wolfenbüttel, Brunswick-Lüneburg
- Died: 3 July 1792 (aged 71); Brunswick, Brunswick-Lüneburg
- Father: Ferdinand Albert II, Duke of Brunswick-Lüneburg
- Mother: Antoinette Amalie of Brunswick-Wolfenbüttel
- Military career
- Allegiance: (Kingdom of Prussia) Prussia (1740–1757) (Province of Hanover) Hanover (1757–1763)
- Rank: Field Marshal
- Conflicts: War of the Austrian Succession; Battle of Mollwitz; Battle of Chotusitz; Battle of Soor; Seven Years' War; Battle of Lobositz; Battle of Prague; Battle of Rossbach; Battle of Rheinberg; Battle of Kreffeld; Battle of Corbach; Battle of Minden; Battle of Warburg; Battle of Kloster Kampen; Battle of Villinghausen; Battle of Wilhelmsthal; 2nd Battle of Lutterberg; Battle of Nauheim; 2nd Siege of Cassel

Signature
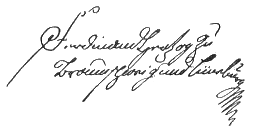

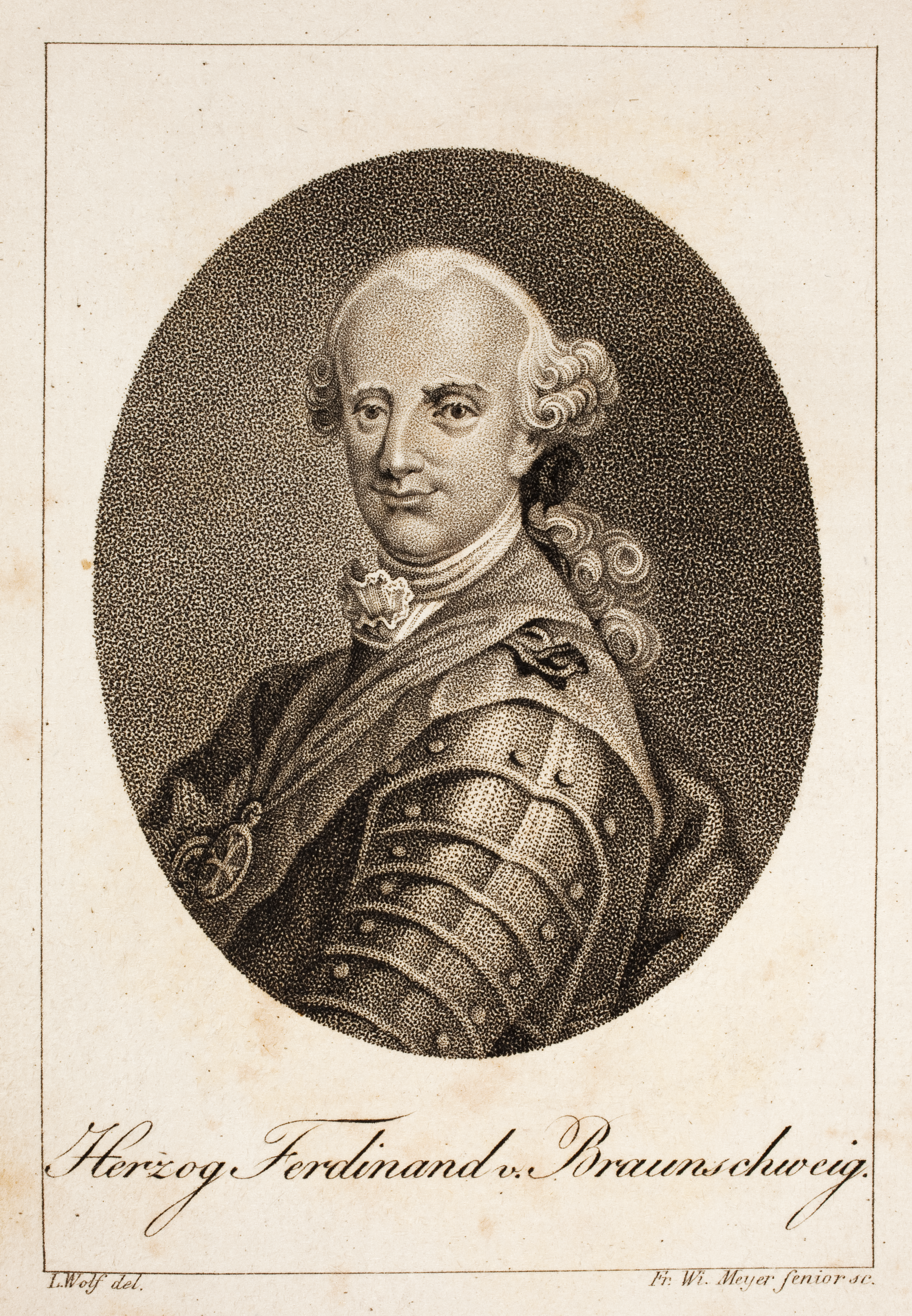
Duke Ferdinand of Brunswick-Wolfenbüttel

Duke Ferdinand of Brunswick-Wolfenbüttel (12 January 1721 – 3 July 1792) was a German military officer best known for his participation in the Seven Years' War. From 1757 to 1762, he led an Anglo-German army in western Germany which successfully repelled French attempts to capture Hanover.

== Early life ==
The fourth son of Ferdinand Albert II, Duke of Brunswick-Lüneburg, Ferdinand joined the Prussian army as a colonel in 1740. He was present in the battles of Mollwitz and Chotusitz. After Margrave Wilhelm of Brandenburg-Schwedt was killed at Prague in 1744, Ferdinand received command of Frederick the Great's Leibgarde battalion, and at the Battle of Soor (1745) he distinguished himself greatly, especially in the assault of a steep hill, that incidentally was defended by his older brother duke Louis Ernest of Brunswick-Lüneburg. He took part in the Second Silesian War before leading part of the invasion of Saxony and Bohemia in 1756 during the Seven Years' War. He participated in the Battle of Rossbach, and then became commander of the allied Hanoverian Army.

During ten years of peace, he was in the closest touch with the military work of Frederick the Great, who supervised the instruction of the guard battalion, and sought to make it a model of the whole Prussian army. Ferdinand was, moreover, one of the most intimate friends of the king, and thus he was peculiarly fitted for the tasks which afterwards fell to his lot. In this time, he was promoted to major-general and then lieutenant-general.

== Seven Years' War ==
In the first campaign of the Seven Years' War, Ferdinand commanded one of the Prussian columns which converged upon Dresden, and in the operations which led up to the surrender of the Saxon army at Pirna (1756). At the Battle of Lobositz, he led the right wing of the Prussian infantry. In 1757, he distinguished himself at Prague, and served also in the Rossbach campaign.

=== Hanover ===
Shortly after this, he was appointed to command the Hanoverian Army of Observation which had been raised and funded by Britain to protect western Germany, but had recently failed to prevent the French Invasion of Hanover under the previous commander the Duke of Cumberland. Ferdinand accepted this appointment on the condition that he would have direct access to George II ruler of Hanover and Britain. His new commission placed him in Hanoverian service, rather than Prussian or British. Despite this Frederick continued to communicate with him as though he were under his direct command.

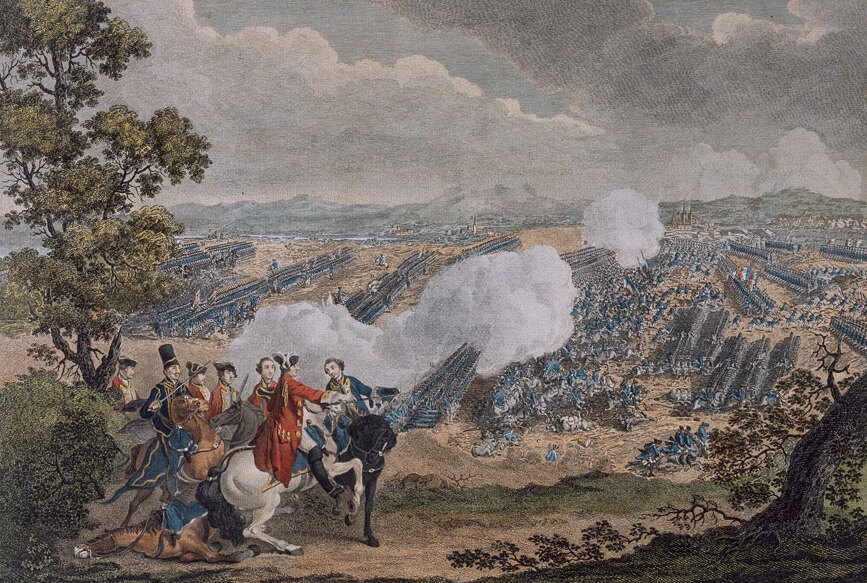
The Battle of Minden, Ferdinand's best known victory

He found this army dejected by a reverse and a capitulation, yet within a week of his taking up the command, he assumed the offensive, and thus began the career of victory which made his reputation as a soldier. He tried to raise Hanoverian support for the war effort by highlighting various atrocities committed by French troops during their occupation. By Spring 1758 he had driven the French out of Hanover and back across the River Rhine which gave him a reputation in Britain as a talented General, and helped boost support for British involvement in the German war. From June 1758, following the Capture of Emden, British troops arrived on the continent and directly added to Ferdinand's forces. The number of British troops was increased throughout the war.

=== Offensive across the Rhine ===
Ferdinand followed up his success in driving the French back by crossing the Rhine himself as part of a fresh offensive. This caused alarm in France, as it was feared that a naval descent by large number of British reinforcements was intended to be co-ordinated with Ferdinand's advance, although the destination of the descent soon turned out to be St Malo in Brittany rather than the Low Countries. In spite of this Ferdinand still posed a not insignificant threat and it was believed he was poised to attack the Austrian Netherlands or even northern Italy.

On 12 June 1758 he fought an indecisive Battle of Rheinberg before he won the Battle of Krefeld but could not easily maintain so advanced a position and fell back to the River Lippe.

=== Minden ===
He resumed a bold offensive in 1759, only to be repulsed at Bergen where he was defeated by France in the Battle of Bergen on 13 April 1759. Following the battle Ferdinand retreated in the face of a French advance, but managed to check them with a decisive victory at the Battle of Minden. This ended the immediate French threat to Hanover, as the French army was in no condition to continue its advance.

Villinghausen, Wilhelmsthal, Warburg and other victories attested the increasing power of Ferdinand in the following campaigns, and Frederick, hard pressed in the eastern theatre of war, owed much of his success in an almost hopeless task to the continued pressure exerted by Ferdinand in the west.

In promoting him to Field Marshal in November 1758, Frederick acknowledged his debt in the words, Je n'ai fait que ce que je dois, mon cher Ferdinand. After Minden, King George II of Great Britain gave the duke the Order of the Garter, and the thanks of the British parliament were voted on the same occasion to the victor of Minden.

== Later career ==
After the Seven Years' War, he was honored by other sovereigns, and he received the rank of field marshal and a regiment from the Austrians. During the War of American Independence, there was a suggestion, which came to nothing, of offering him the command of the British forces. He devoted most of the small income he received from his various offices and the rewards given to him by the allied princes to compensate those who had suffered in the Seven Years' War.

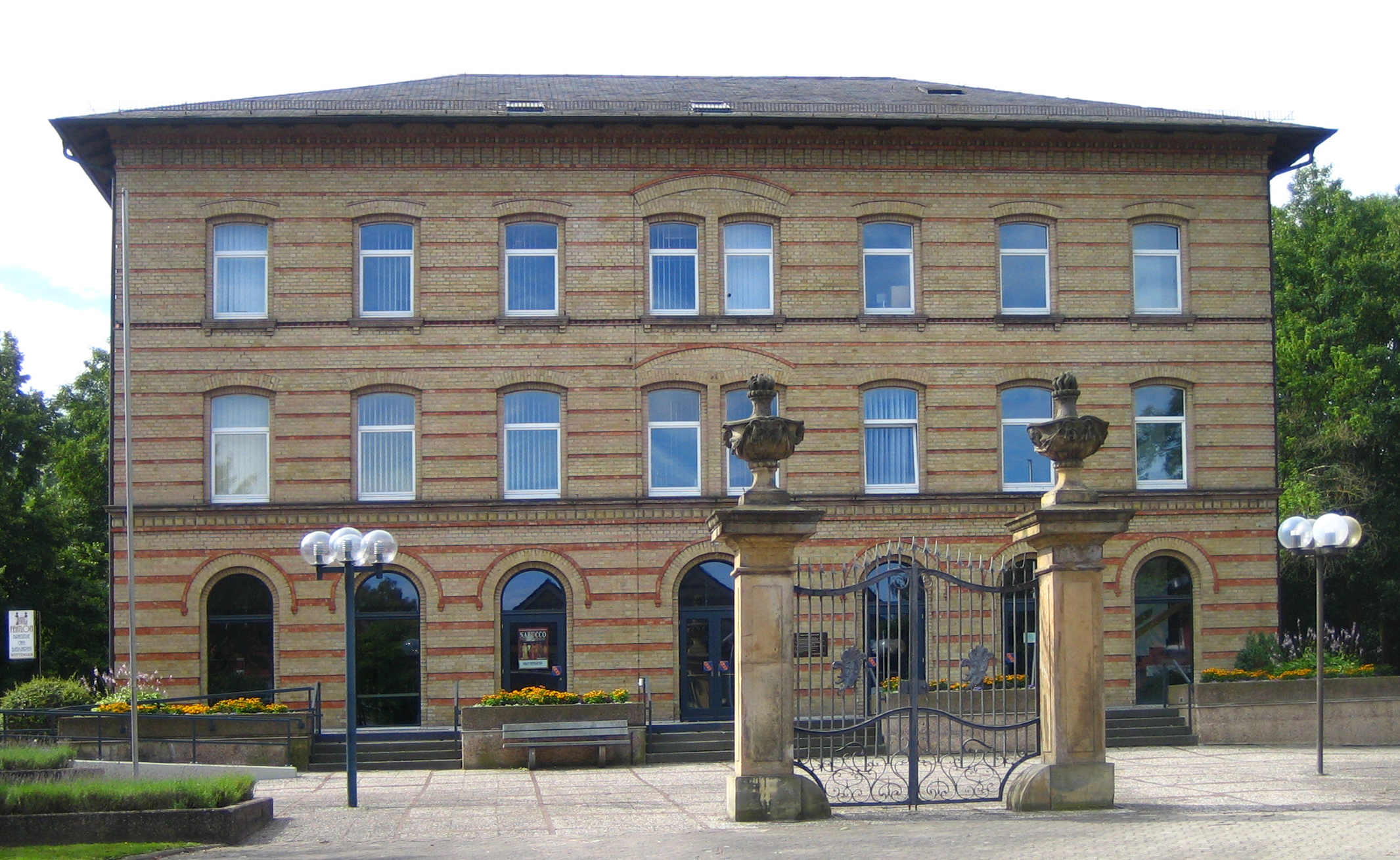
″Ferdinand's Gate″ at the entrance to Vechelde palace garden

The estrangement of Frederick and Ferdinand in 1766 led to the duke's retirement from Prussian service, but there was no open breach between the old friends, and Ferdinand visited the king in 1772, 1777, 1779 and 1782. Ferdinand retired to Brunswick and his castle of Vechelde, where he occupied himself in building and other improvements. He became a patron of learning and art, and a great benefactor of the poor. Never married and childless, Ferdinand died on 3 July 1792.

The merits, civil and military, of the prince were recognized by memorials not only in Prussia and Hanover, but also in Denmark, the states of western Germany and England. The Prussian memorials include an equestrian statue at Berlin 1863.

== Freemasonry ==
He also was a freemason, initiated in 1740 into the Lodge of The Three Globes in Berlin, and received the degree of Master Mason in 1743 at Breslau. From 1770 he served as English Provincial Grand Master for the Duchy of Brunswick, and one year later he joined the Rite of Strict Observance. At the Convent of Kohlo in 1772, he received the office of Grand Master of all Scottish lodges. He convened the Masonic Convent of Wilhelmsbad, which lasted from 16 July to 1 September 1782, but ultimately led to the dissolution of the Strict Observance. In 1783, like Charles of Hesse-Kassel, he became a member of the Illuminati, and in 1786 he received the dignity of General Obermeister of the Asiatic Brethren.

== Ancestry ==
Ancestors of Duke Ferdinand of Brunswick-Wolfenbüttel

8. Augustus the Younger, Duke of Brunswick-Lüneburg
4. Ferdinand Albert I, Duke of Brunswick-Lüneburg
9. Elisabeth Juliane of Schleswig-Holstein-Sonderburg-Norburg
2. Ferdinand Albert II, Duke of Brunswick-Lüneburg
10. Frederick, Landgrave of Hesse-Eschwege
5. Christina Wilhelmina of Hesse-Eschwege
11. Countess Palatine Eleonora Catherine of Zweibrücken
1. Prince Ferdinand of Brunswick
12. Anthony Ulrich, Duke of Brunswick-Wolfenbüttel
6. Louis Rudolph, Duke of Brunswick-Lüneburg
13. Augustus the Younger, Duke of Brunswick-Lüneburg
3. Antoinette of Brunswick-Wolfenbüttel
14. Albert Ernest I of Oettingen-Oettingen
7. Princess Christine Louise of Oettingen-Oettingen
15. Christine Friederike of Württemberg

== Bibliography ==
- McLynn, Frank (2005). 1759: The Year Britain Became Master of the World. Pimlico.
- Marston, Daniel (2001). The Seven Years War. Osprey publishing.
