= Duchess Luise of Brunswick-Wolfenbüttel =

Duchess Ludovika
- Princess Augustus William of Prussia
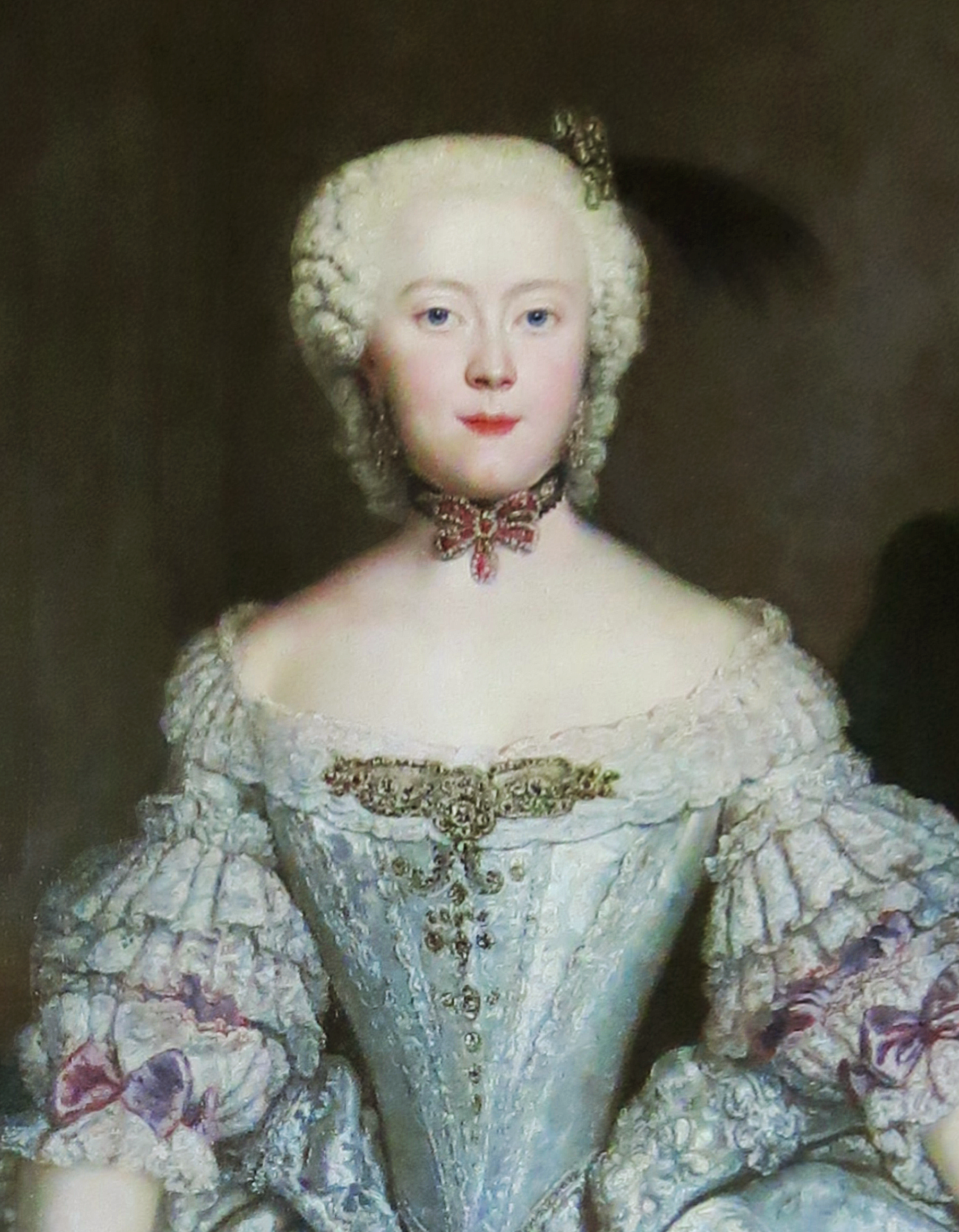
- Portrait by Antoine Pesne.
- Born: 29 January 1722; Schloss Bevern, Weser
- Died: 13 January 1780 (aged 57); Schloss Oranienburg, Berlin, Prussia
- Burial: Berlin Cathedral
- Spouse: Prince Augustus William of Prussia (m. 1742; died 1758)
- Issue: Frederick William II of Prussia; Prince Henry; Wilhelmina, Princess of Orange; Prince Emil
- Father: Ferdinand Albert II, Duke of Brunswick-Wolfenbüttel
- Mother: Duchess Antoinette of Brunswick-Wolfenbüttel

Duchess Ludovika of Brunswick-Wolfenbüttel (Ludovika Amalie; 29 January 1722 – 13 January 1780) was daughter of Ferdinand Albert II, Duke of Brunswick-Wolfenbüttel and his wife Duchess Antoinette of Brunswick-Wolfenbüttel.

== Background ==
She was born at the Schloss Bevern near Weser. She was the seventh of fourteen children. Her parents were second cousins.

== Marriage ==
On 6 January 1742 she married Prince Augustus William of Prussia, second son of King Frederick William I of Prussia and Sophia Dorothea of Hanover. Prince Augustus William was a younger brother of the reigning Frederick the Great, whose spouse, Luise's own sister, gave him no children. As such, her son was to inherit the Prussian throne in 1786. In her widowhood, she was given the Crown Prince's Palace in Berlin.

== Family ==
Her older sister was Queen Elisabeth Christine of Prussia, wife of her brother-in-law Frederick the Great. She was also the sibling of Queen Juliana Maria of Denmark and Norway and Charles I, Duke of Brunswick-Wolfenbüttel.

== Issue ==
- Frederick William II of Prussia (1744–1797) married Elisabeth Christine of Brunswick-Wolfenbüttel and had issue. Married Frederica Louisa of Hesse-Darmstadt and had issue.
- Prince Henry of Prussia (1747–1767) died unmarried.
- Princess Wilhelmina of Prussia (1751–1820) married William V, Prince of Orange and had issue.
- Prince Emil of Prussia (1758–1759) died in infancy.

== Ancestry ==
Ancestors of Duchess Luise of Brunswick-Wolfenbüttel

8. Augustus II, Duke of Brunswick-Wolfenbüttel
4. Ferdinand Albert I, Duke of Brunswick-Wolfenbüttel-Bevern
9. Duchess Elisabeth Sophie of Mecklenburg-Güstrow
2. Ferdinand Albert II, Duke of Brunswick-Wolfenbüttel
10. Frederick, Landgrave of Hesse-Eschwege
5. Princess Christine of Hesse-Eschwege
11. Countess Palatine Eleonora Catherine of Kleeburg
1. Duchess Luise of Brunswick-Wolfenbüttel
12. Anthony Ulrich, Duke of Brunswick-Wolfenbüttel
6. Louis Rudolph, Duke of Brunswick-Wolfenbüttel
13. Princess Elisabeth Juliana of Schleswig-Holstein-Sonderburg-Norburg
3. Duchess Antoinette of Brunswick-Wolfenbüttel
14. Albert Ernest I, Prince of Oettingen-Oettingen
7. Princess Christine Louise of Oettingen-Oettingen
15. Duchess Christine Friederike of Württemberg
