= Elisabeth Christine of Brunswick-Wolfenbüttel-Bevern =

Queen of Prussia from 1740 to 1786

Elisabeth Christine
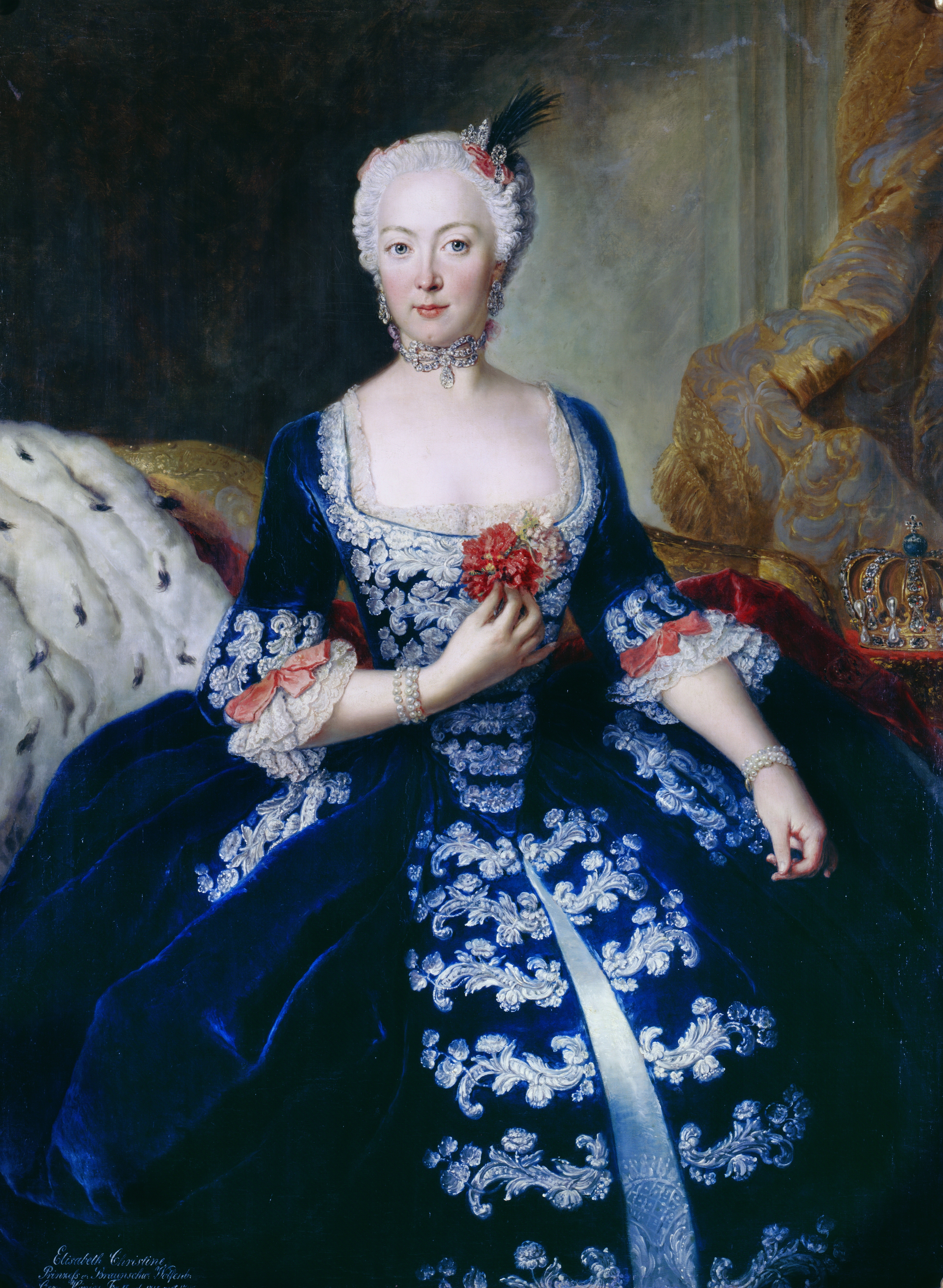
- Portrait by Antoine Pesne, c. 1739

Queen consort in/of Prussia; Electress consort of Brandenburg
- Tenure: 31 May 1740 – 17 August 1786
- Born: Duchess Elisabeth Christine of Brunswick-Wolfenbüttel-Bevern; 8 November 1715; Schloss Bevern, Duchy of Brunswick, Holy Roman Empire
- Died: 13 January 1797 (aged 81); Stadtschloss, Berlin, Prussia, Holy Roman Empire
- Burial: Berlin Cathedral
- Spouse: Frederick II of Prussia (m. 1733; died 1786)
- House: Brunswick-Bevern
- Father: Ferdinand Albert II, Duke of Brunswick-Wolfenbüttel
- Mother: Antoinette of Brunswick-Wolfenbüttel

Elisabeth Christine of Brunswick-Wolfenbüttel-Bevern (8 November 1715 – 13 January 1797) was Queen of Prussia (Queen in Prussia until 1772) and Electress of Brandenburg as the wife of Frederick the Great. She was the longest-serving Prussian queen, with a tenure of more than 46 years. She was praised for her charity work during the Seven Years' War.

== Crown princess ==
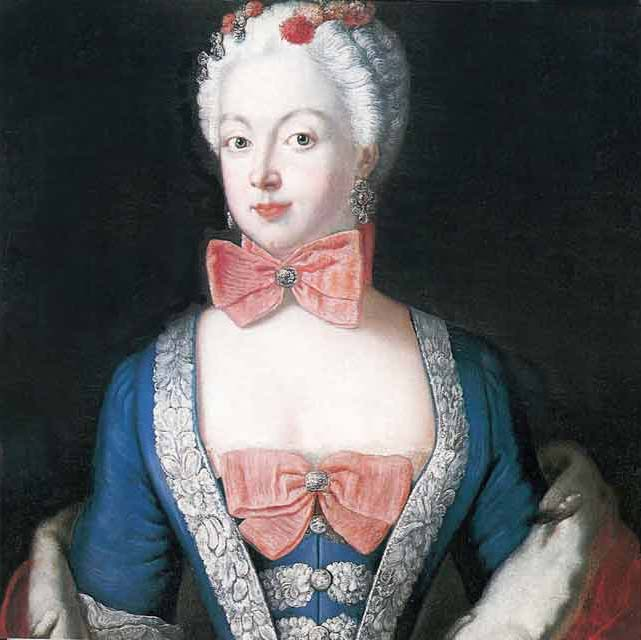
Elisabeth Christine, c. 1739, the year before she became queen.

In 1730, Crown Prince Frederick of Prussia tried to flee from the tyrannical regime of his father, King Frederick William I, but was caught and imprisoned. To regain his freedom, he was required to marry Elisabeth Christine, daughter of Ferdinand Albert II, Duke of Brunswick-Wolfenbüttel and his wife Antoinette, in 1733. Elisabeth's maternal aunt Elisabeth Christine was the wife of Charles VI, Holy Roman Emperor. The match had thus been sought diplomatically by the Austrian court as well as by the "imperial party" around the king. This was in sharp contrast to the "English party" around Queen Sophie Dorothea, sister of King George II of Great Britain, and Crown Prince Frederick himself. They were seeking a marriage to the Queen's niece, Princess Amelia of Great Britain, which would result in a strong alliance between Prussia and Great Britain and was considered by the somewhat vain young prince a more "brilliant" match than the "provincial" Elisabeth Christine.

On 12 June, 17-year-old Elisabeth Christine was married to Frederick at her father's summer palace, Schloss Salzdahlum in Wolfenbüttel, Germany. On their wedding night, Frederick spent a reluctant hour with his wife and then walked about outside for the rest of the night. Due to the circumstances behind their betrothal, he was well known to have resented the marriage from the very beginning. Thus, Elizabeth's position at the Berlin court was difficult from the beginning, as the only support that she could count on was the king's.

Elisabeth indeed remained attached to her father-in-law, who was particularly fond of her piety, which did nothing to endear her husband. Frederick is widely presumed to have been homosexual, having shown no sexual or even platonic interest in women; the only woman whom he considered a close friend was his older sister, Wilhelmine. However, he was shrewd enough to recognise the opportunity Elisabeth provided to improve his own relationship with his father and systematically used her to gain royal favours. During the first year of their marriage, Frederick was garrisoned in command of his own regiment, at his establishment at Ruppin, which he had been given by his father after the betrothal, while Elisabeth lived in Berlin at the king's court. Her husband showered her with letters asking for things such as travel permits and money from the king or even demanding that she run up debts in Brunswick to pay for his expenses. This pattern continued even after the couple moved to Rheinsberg Palace in 1736.

== Queen consort ==
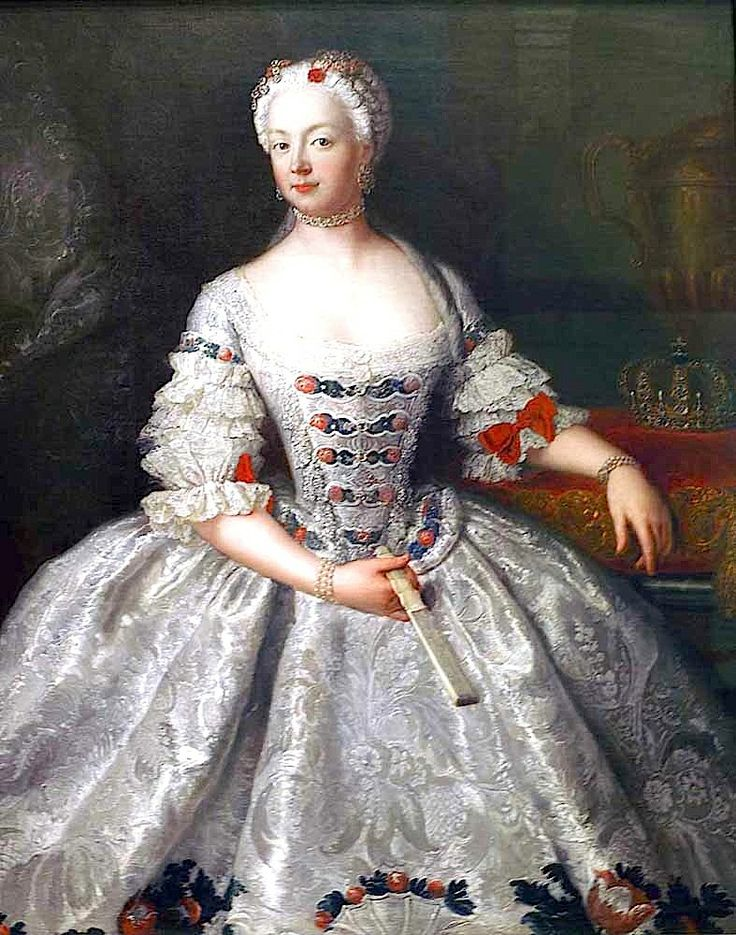
Queen Elisabeth Christine of Brunswick-Wolfenbüttel-Bevern

After the death of her father-in-law, her husband acceded to the throne of Prussia as Frederick II in 1740. He had no known affairs with women and presided over a very spartan, almost military court where women rarely appeared. He did not care for ceremonial court life and representation and left most of the posts in his own court vacant at Potsdam. During the first years of his reign, he did somewhat revive the court life, but after Sanssouci Palace in Potsdam was completed in 1747, he spent his life more isolated in Sanssouci in the summer and the City Palace, Potsdam in the winter, and only appeared at the official royal court in Berlin at special occasions such as royal birthdays and visits of foreign princes. Despite his personal contempt for representational court life, however, he realized its importance in the system of state and therefore did not abolish court life in Prussia, but rather left all court duties to Elisabeth.

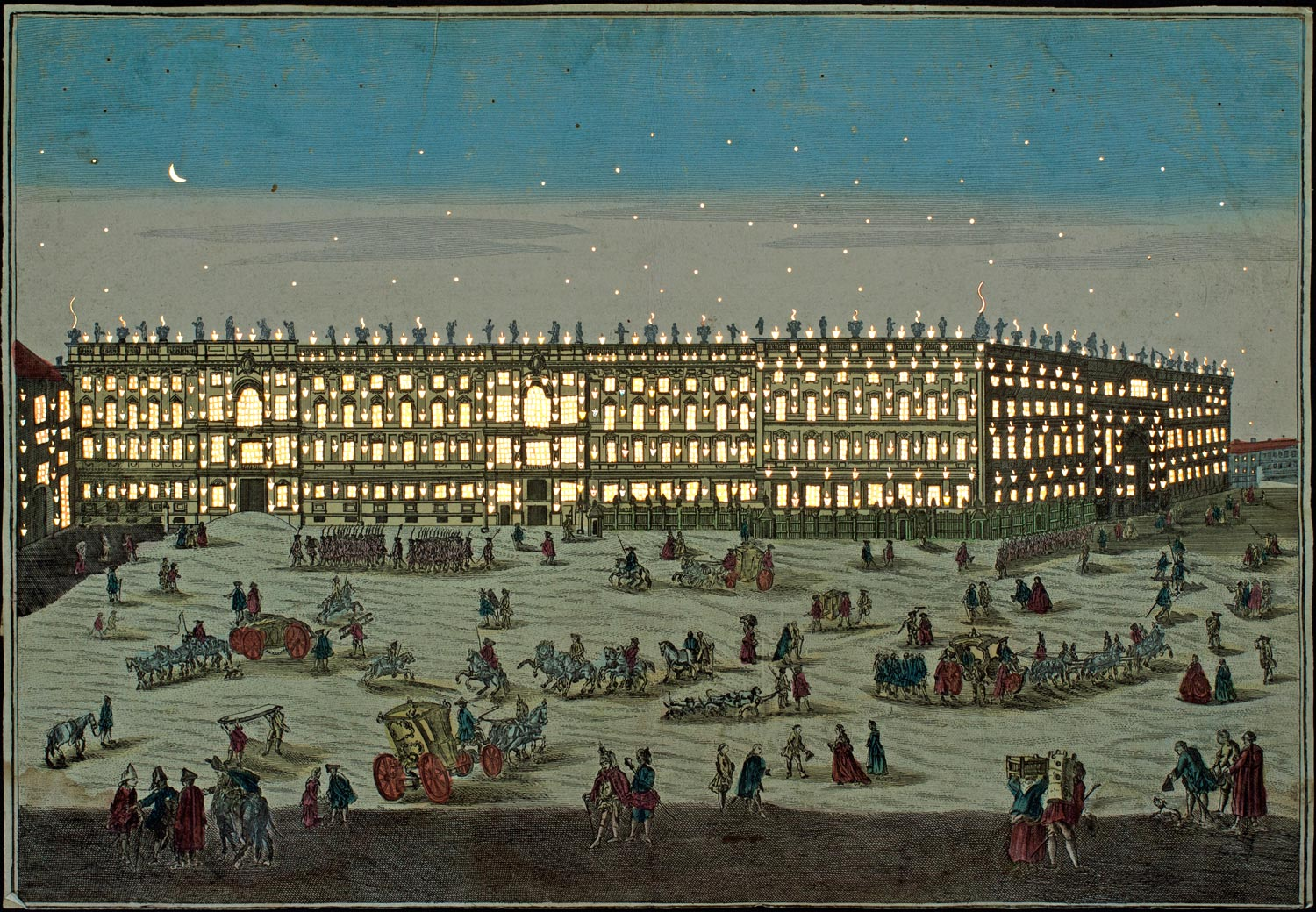
The Berlin Palace as an illuminated peep box picture of 1780

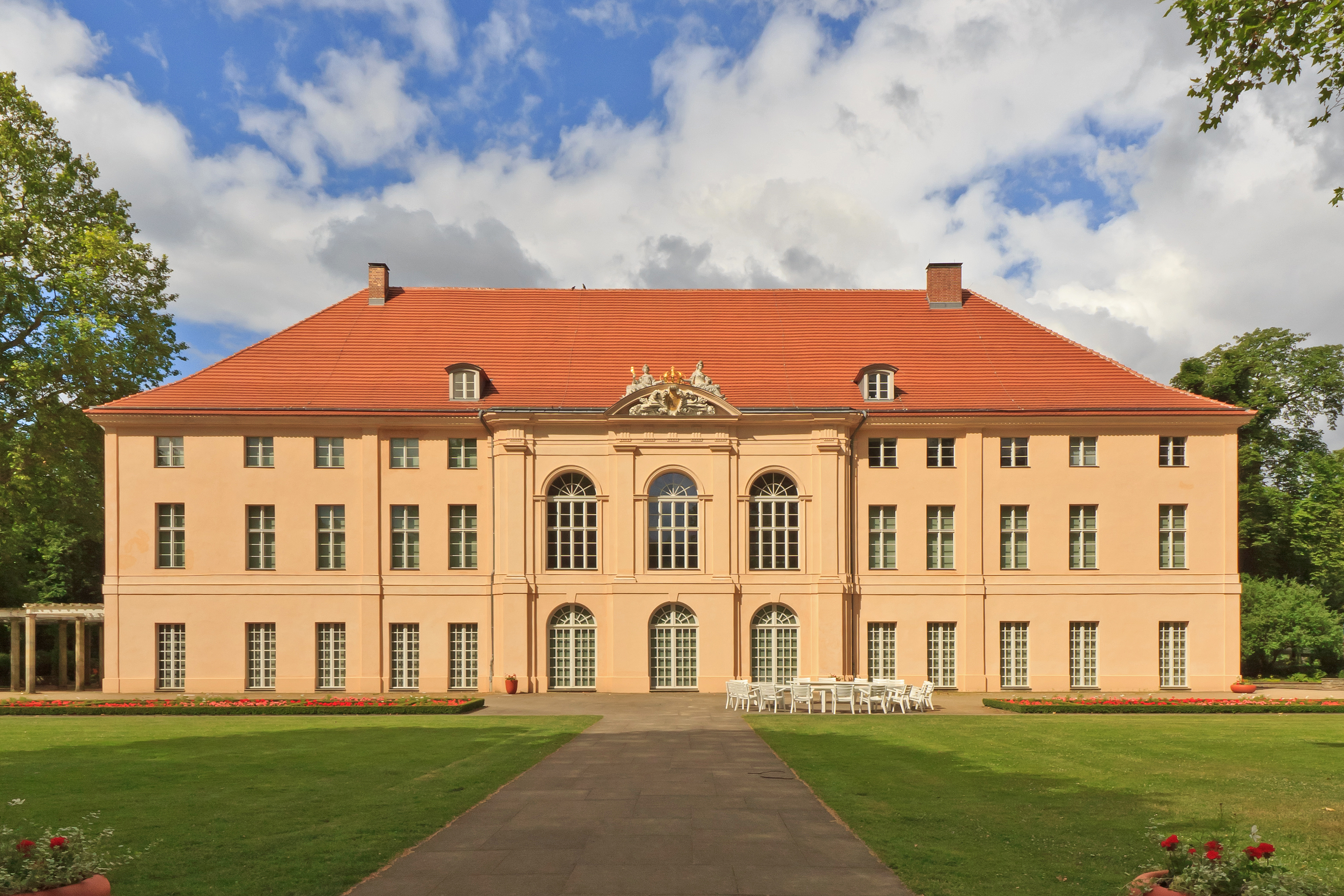
Elisabeth's summer residence, Schönhausen Palace near Berlin

Elisabeth had a very visible and public role in Prussia. During the first 17 years of her husband's reign, she shared the representational duties of the court with her mother-in-law until the latter's death in 1757, after which she handled them alone, as the only member of the royal family living in the huge Berlin Palace. Frederick also gave Elisabeth her own summer residence, Schönhausen Palace near Berlin, and redecorated her apartments in the Berlin Royal Palace, appointing a large court for her to assist her in upholding the court routine. In Berlin, Elisabeth received foreign princes, ambassadors and generals; entertained the royal family and Prussian aristocracy with concerts; and hosted a circle of Lutheran theologians such as Anton Friedrich Büsching, Johann Joachim Spalding and Johann Friedrich Zöllner. At both residences, she presided at the weekly reception days, courtage, which were the only occasions where the entire Prussian royal court assembled as a whole during the reign of Frederick the Great, who hardly ever took part himself. In addition to the courtages, large dinners, balls, opera performances, ambassador's receptions and family celebrations (birthdays, christenings, weddings) were on her program. Her receptions were always well attended as she hosted the only court life taking place in Prussia at the time, which made it an important social center and a place to meet important people.

A reception by Elisabeth Christine in Schönhausen was described in 1779 by the English tourist Dr. Moore:

The Queen has one Court-day in the week, when the Princes, nobility, and foreign ambassadors wait upon her, at five o' clock. After she has made the tour of the circle, and said a few words to each, she seats herself at the card-table. The Queen has her own table, and each of the Princesses has one. The rest of the company shows itself a moment at each of these card tables, and then the attendance for the day is over, and they walk in the garden, or form other card-tables in the other rooms, as it pleases them, and return to Berlin at dusk. Sometimes the Queen invites a good many of them to supper, and then they remain till midnight. These are the only assemblies where one meets the Berlin ladies in summer.

Despite the fact that Frederick entrusted the role of representation to her, he did not always give her the funds necessary to play this role, and it caused surprise to foreigners that the king did not give the queen funds necessary to entertain more lavishly. As the king became more spartan over the years, the receptions of the queen became more underfunded, Charpentier once joking: "The Queen must have a grand gala tonight; I saw an old lamp lighted on the staircase as I passed!" The king himself only very rarely attended any of the court events, while the queen was always present. He visited the birthday celebration of the queen only twice between 1741 and 1762. Frederick was often absent even at his own official birthday celebration, where she received birthday congratulations in his place, and when he did attend, he normally appeared very briefly. Frederick was often absent even at important functions, such as the state visit of the Tsesarevich Paul in 1776.

When he did appear in Berlin, mainly during the carnival ball season, Frederick normally did not represent at his own apartment, but merely visited the queen's reception in her apartment. While he on rare occasions participated in Berlin court life, he never visited her court at Schönhausen, nor was she ever invited to Sanssouci. On the one hand, compliance with protocol and etiquette was important to him, so he made sure that the queen's carriage always drove directly behind his on ceremonial processions, even in front of that of his adored mother. On the other hand, he humiliated her by not even inviting her to some important celebrations. Neither did she receive an invitation to the inauguration of the new wing of Charlottenburg Palace in the summer of 1746, nor to a large celebration that the king gave in August 1749 in honor of his mother in Sanssouci.

In 1763, when after the Seven Years' War, Frederick saw his wife for the first time in six years, he only told her "Madame has become more stout" and then turned to his waiting sisters. Despite his lack of interest in her person, he demanded that she should be respected in her capacity as a queen, but his separation from her along with her aroused pity made it hard for her to receive respect from the nobility: on one occasion, the opera singers refused to appear at her concert and she forced Frederick to demand that she be treated with respect. In many aspects her situation was similar to that of her sister-in-law, Princess Wilhelmina, the neglected wife of the king's brother Prince Henry, only that the queen consort had an important representational task.

=== Influence ===
During the Seven Years' War, the king was permanently absent from the capital for six years, which made the queen the symbol of Prussian resilience in the capital during the crisis. Elisabeth was often greeted by cheering crowds when she appeared in public. When Berlin was threatened in 1757, it was Elisabeth who took the responsibility for the royal house and ordered for its evacuation to Magdeburg. She was able to return to Berlin in 1758, but was again forced to evacuate in 1760. It was on the first of these occasions that she saw Sanssouci for the first time.

Elisabeth was interested in political literature and authored several translations under the pseudonym "Constance". After the death of her friend Sophie Caroline von Camas in 1766, she published a French translation of Le Chrétien dans la Solitude. Her translations of the Réflexions sur l'etat des affaires publiques en 1778 aroused public patriotism during the War of Bavarian Succession. Her political works were included in the royal library and the king presented her with his own ideas.

Elisabeth successfully introduced silk cultivation to Prussia and was involved in charity, to which she contributed 23,000 thalers out of her allowance of 40,000 thalers, more than half her income. She said of herself: "God has graciously kept me, so that I need not reproach myself for any action by which any person has with my knowledge been hurt." Elisabeth is noted to have acted as an intermediary and interceded in favor of supplicants. She particularly supported the French émigrés community in Berlin. Spalding commented: "her memory will always be blessed as a touching example of the noblest mental qualities, the most enlightened and lively piety, and the most wonderfully active benevolence."

== Queen dowager ==
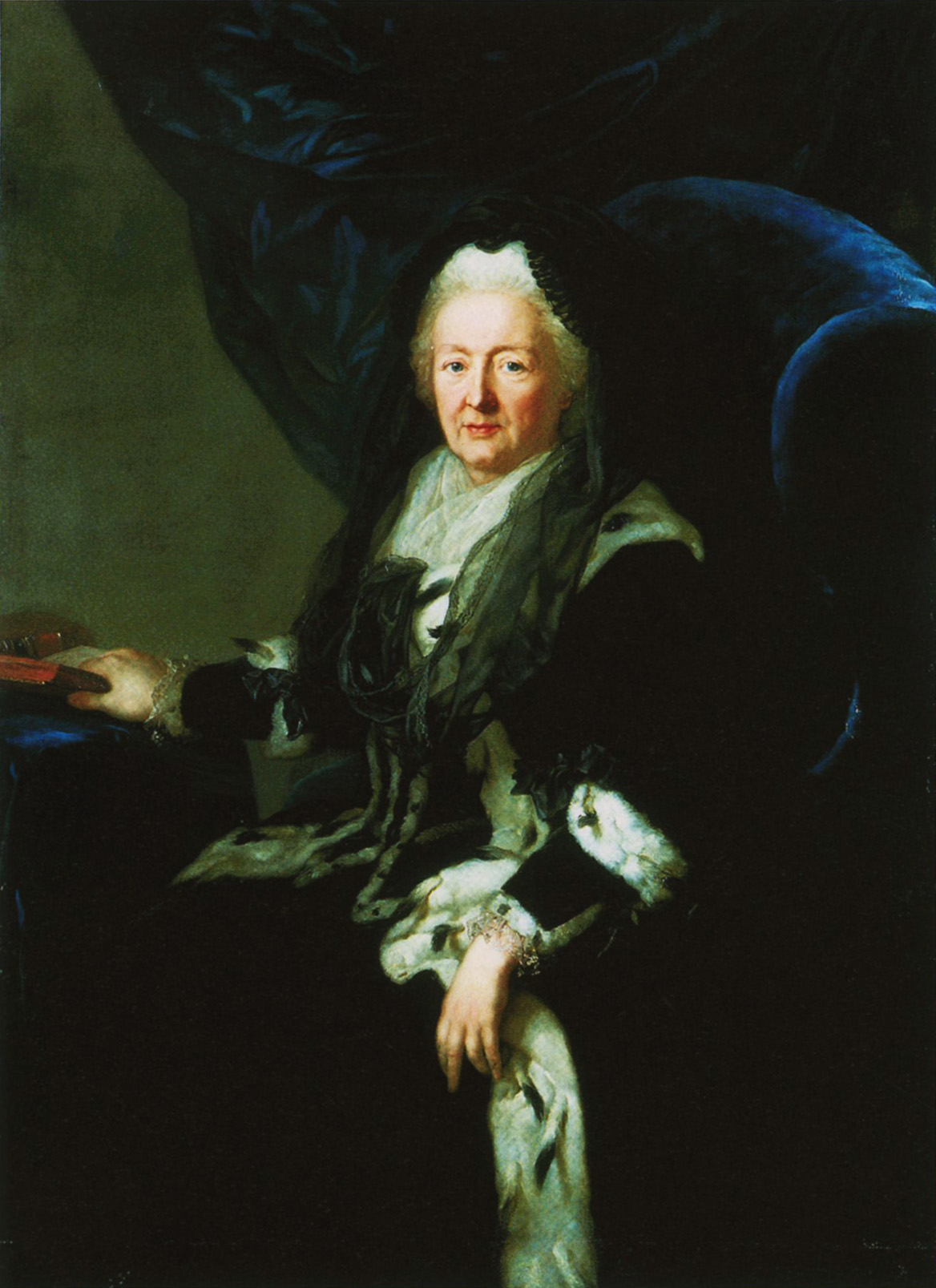
Elisabeth Christine dressed in widow's clothes (portrait by Anton Graff, 1789)

Elisabeth Christine became queen dowager upon the death of Frederick the Great on 17 August 1786. Elisabeth was not present at the death of her spouse and had not seen him since January of that year, but was given public sympathy for his death because of the popularity she enjoyed among the public, to all of whom, according to Spalding, she was "so dear in her affliction." She commented on the death of Frederick to his successor, Frederick William II, with the words:

Frederick the Great would have been adored for his great qualities had he been only a private individual; all great Princes might take example from him; he reigned like the true father of his people. He was a true friend himself, but he had many false ones, who, under the mask of attachment, separated him from those who were devoted to him heart and soul; yet these deceitful persons caused him sorrow when he discovered their falsehood, and he rendered justice to his true friends without bringing them into notice, lest he should expose them to persecution. He was generous and beneficent, he maintained his position without hauteur, and in society he was like a private gentleman.

In the will of Frederick the Great, Elisabeth was secured not only the continuation of her usual income, but also an additional 10,000 thalers annually, residence, games, wine, and firewood in the royal palaces of her choice, and a directive that his successor and nephew Frederick William always treat her with respect due to her position. As queen dowager, Elisabeth Christine had an active role in public life. Due to her long experience in handling the representational life of the reign of Frederick the Great, "the Queen Dowager, who, by her circumspection and natural dignity, was of more importance than the Queen", was often consulted in court matters. She was a center in the family life of the royal house, corresponding with them while they were away, particularly with her former foster daughter Princess Frederica Charlotte of Prussia.

== Ancestors ==
Ancestors of Elisabeth Christine of Brunswick-Wolfenbüttel-Bevern

8. Augustus II, Duke of Brunswick-Wolfenbüttel
4. Ferdinand Albert I, Duke of Brunswick-Wolfenbüttel-Bevern
9. Duchess Elisabeth Sophie of Mecklenburg-Güstrow
2. Ferdinand Albert II, Duke of Brunswick-Wolfenbüttel
10. Frederick, Landgrave of Hesse-Eschwege
5. Princess Christine of Hesse-Eschwege
11. Countess Palatine Eleonora Catherine of Kleeburg
1. Elisabeth Christine of Brunswick-Wolfenbüttel-Bevern
12. Anthony Ulrich, Duke of Brunswick-Wolfenbüttel
6. Louis Rudolph, Duke of Brunswick-Wolfenbüttel
13. Princess Elisabeth Juliana of Schleswig-Holstein-Sonderburg-Norburg
3. Duchess Antoinette of Brunswick-Wolfenbüttel
14. Albert Ernest I, Prince of Oettingen-Oettingen
7. Princess Christine Louise of Oettingen-Oettingen
15. Duchess Christine Friederike of Württemberg

== Sources ==
- Biskup, Thomas. (2004). "The Hidden Queen: Elisabeth Christine of Prussia and Hohenzollern Queenship in the Eighteenth Century" in Queenship in Europe 1660-1815: The Role of the Consort. Clarissa Campbell Orr (ed.). Cambridge University Press. ISBN 0-521-81422-7.
- Hans-Henning Grote (2005) Schloss Wolfenbüttel. Residenz der Herzöge zu Braunschweig und Lüneburg. S. 228. ISBN 3-937664-32-7.
- Paul Noack: Elisabeth Christine und Friedrich der Große. Ein Frauenleben in Preußen. 2. Auflage. Klett-Cotta, Stuttgart 2002, S. 185, ISBN 3-608-94292-0
- Reiners, Ludwig (Swedish): Fredrik den store (Fredrick the Great). Bokindustri Aktiebolag (1956) Stockholm

Elisabeth Christine of Brunswick-Wolfenbüttel-Bevern House of Brunswick-Bevern Born: 8 November 1715 Died: 13 January 1797
German royalty
Preceded by Sophia Dorothea of Hanover	Queen consort in Prussia; 31 May 1740 – 19 February 1772	Title abolished elevated to Queen consort of Prussia
New title	Queen consort of Prussia; 19 February 1772 – 17 August 1786	Succeeded by Frederika Louisa of Hesse-Darmstadt
