= Therese of Brunswick-Wolfenbüttel =

Princess of Brunswick-Wolfenbüttel, and abbess of Gandersheim Abbey

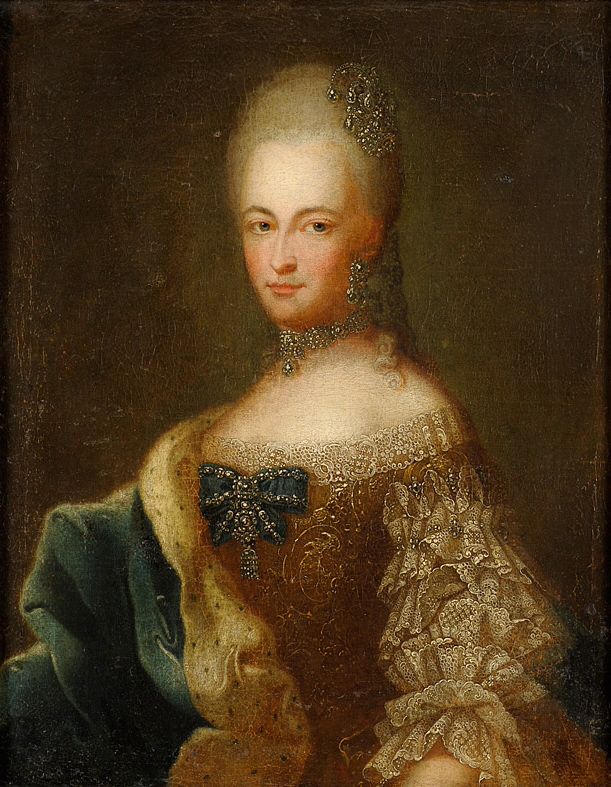
- Portrait of Therese by Johann Georg Ziesenis
- Born: 4 June 1728; Wolfenbüttel
- Died: 26 June 1778 (aged 50); Gandersheim Abbey
- Burial: Brunswick Cathedral
- House: House of Welf
- Father: Ferdinand Albert II, Duke of Brunswick-Wolfenbüttel
- Mother: Princess Antoinette of Brunswick-Wolfenbüttel

Princess Therese Natalie of Brunswick-Wolfenbüttel-Bevern (4 June 1728 in Wolfenbüttel – 26 June 1778 in Gandersheim Abbey, in Bad Gandersheim) was a German noblewoman. She was a member of the House of Welf and was princess-abbess of the Imperial Free secular Abbey in Gandersheim.

== Life ==
Therese Natalie was the sixth daughter of Duke Ferdinand Albert II of Brunswick-Bevern (1680-1735) and his wife Antoinette Amalie (1696-1762), a daughter of Duke Louis Rudolph of Brunswick-Wolfenbüttel and Princess Christine Louise of Oettingen-Oettingen. Therese Natalie was a first cousin of Archduchess Maria Theresa of Austria, Queen of Hungary and Bohemia. She was a sister-in-law of King Frederick II of Prussia.

Efforts to marry Princess Therese Natalie with an Archduke of Austria or a French prince failed because she was unwilling to convert to the Catholic faith. In 1747, she became a collegiate lady in Herford Abbey. Around that time, it was decided that she would succeed Elisabeth of Saxe-Meiningen as abbess of Gandersheim Abbey. In November 1750, she was appointed canoness at Gandersheim. Elisabeth died on Christmas Eve 1766, after 53 years in office. As promised, Therese Natalie was elected as her successor. She was enthroned on 3 December 1767.

During her period in office, Therese Natalie often stayed at the court of her elder brother Charles I in Brunswick. She died in Gandersheim on 26 June 1778 and was buried in the ducal crypt below Brunswick Cathedral. She was succeeded as abbess by her niece Auguste Dorothea of Brunswick-Wolfenbüttel, who would be the last princess-abbess of Gandersheim.
