= Luisenburg (Harz) =

Coordinates: 51°46′58.5″N 10°57′14.5″E

The Luisenburg was a small palace that existed from 1728 to 1945 near Blankenburg (Harz) in central Germany.

It was built in 1728 on the Calviusberg hilltop above Blankenburg Castle as a belvedere for Duchess Christine Louise of Brunswick, and was named after her. The Luisenburg was a single-storey timber-framed building with an octagonal hall surrounded by eight small rooms. In 1945 it was demolished due to its advanced state of dilapidation. Today there are some remains of the exterior walls and its staircase. A refuge hut, that also serves as checkpoint no. 77 on the hiking trail network of the Harzer Wandernadel, stands on the site of the Luisenburg. From the Calviusberg there is a good view of the northern Harz Foreland including the settlements of Cattenstedt and Timmenrode.

A refuge hut, which also houses checkpoint no. 77 in the Harzer Wandernadel hiking network, stands on the site of the Luisenburg.
