= Frederick Francis of Brunswick-Wolfenbüttel =

German noble

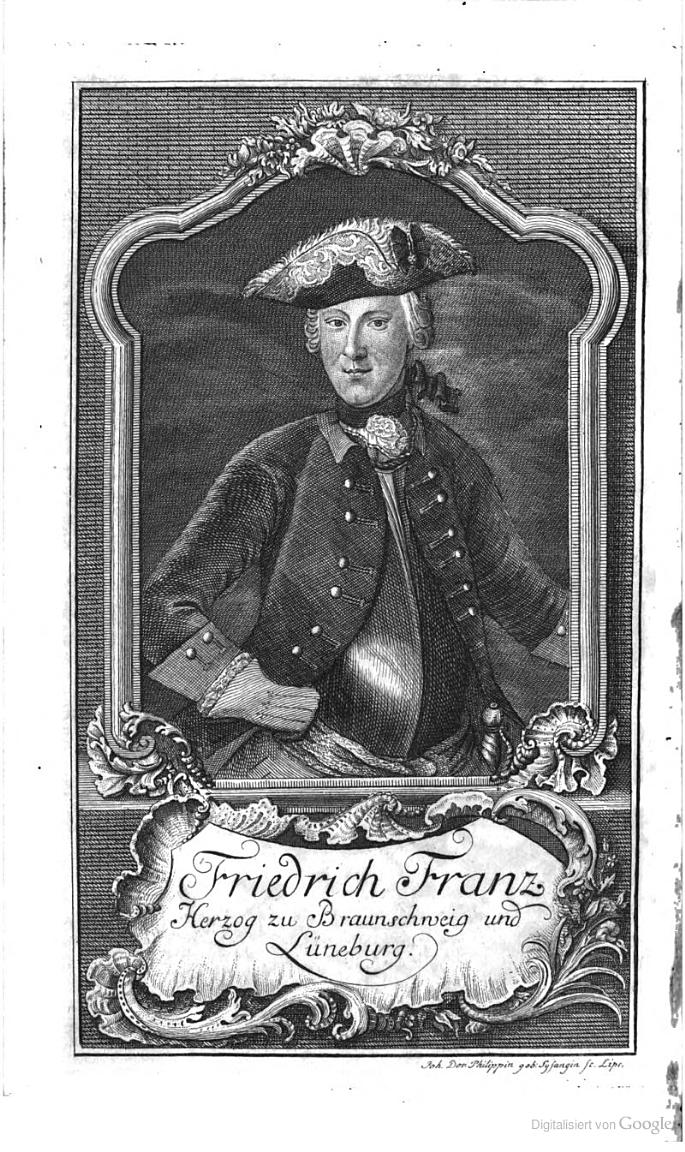
- Born: 22 December 1732
- Died: 14 October 1758 (aged 25)
- Allegiance: Kingdom of Prussia
- Branch: Prussian Army
- Service years: 1750–1758
- Conflicts: Seven Years' War
- Awards: Name inscribed on Frederick the Great's Equestrian Statue

Frederick Francis of Brunswick-Wolfenbüttel (22 December 1732 – 14 October 1758 at the Battle of Hochkirch) was the brother-in-law of a brother of Frederick the Great. His name is listed on the Equestrian statue of Frederick the Great.

== Family ==
Francis was the youngest of 13 children of Ferdinand Albert II, Duke of Brunswick-Wolfenbüttel and Antoinette Amalie (1696–1762); his sister Luise of Brunswick-Wolfenbüttel married Prince Augustus William of Prussia, brother of Frederick the Great.

== Death in battle ==
On 14 October 1758, the Austrians, commanded by Daun, surprised the Prussians with a pre-dawn assault on the sleeping camp. James Keith, Frederick's friend and an able general, had organized a defense of the village while Frederick could withdraw from Hochkirch. This successful action initially repulsed the Austrian advance, giving Frederick hope that the situation could be won. Even after Keith himself was shot and killed, Frederick still thought the battle could be retrieved and returned to the rear echelons to take command. Finding his infantry milling about in the village after Keith was killed, Frederick ordered the infantry to advance, sending reinforcements commanded by his brother-in-law with them. As Francis approached the village, Austrian cannon-fire sheared his head off his shoulders. His troops, demoralized by this sight, faltered.
