= Battle of Wilhelmsthal =

1762 battle of the Seven Years' War

Coordinates: 51.4167°N 9.4000°E

- Part of the Seven Years' War
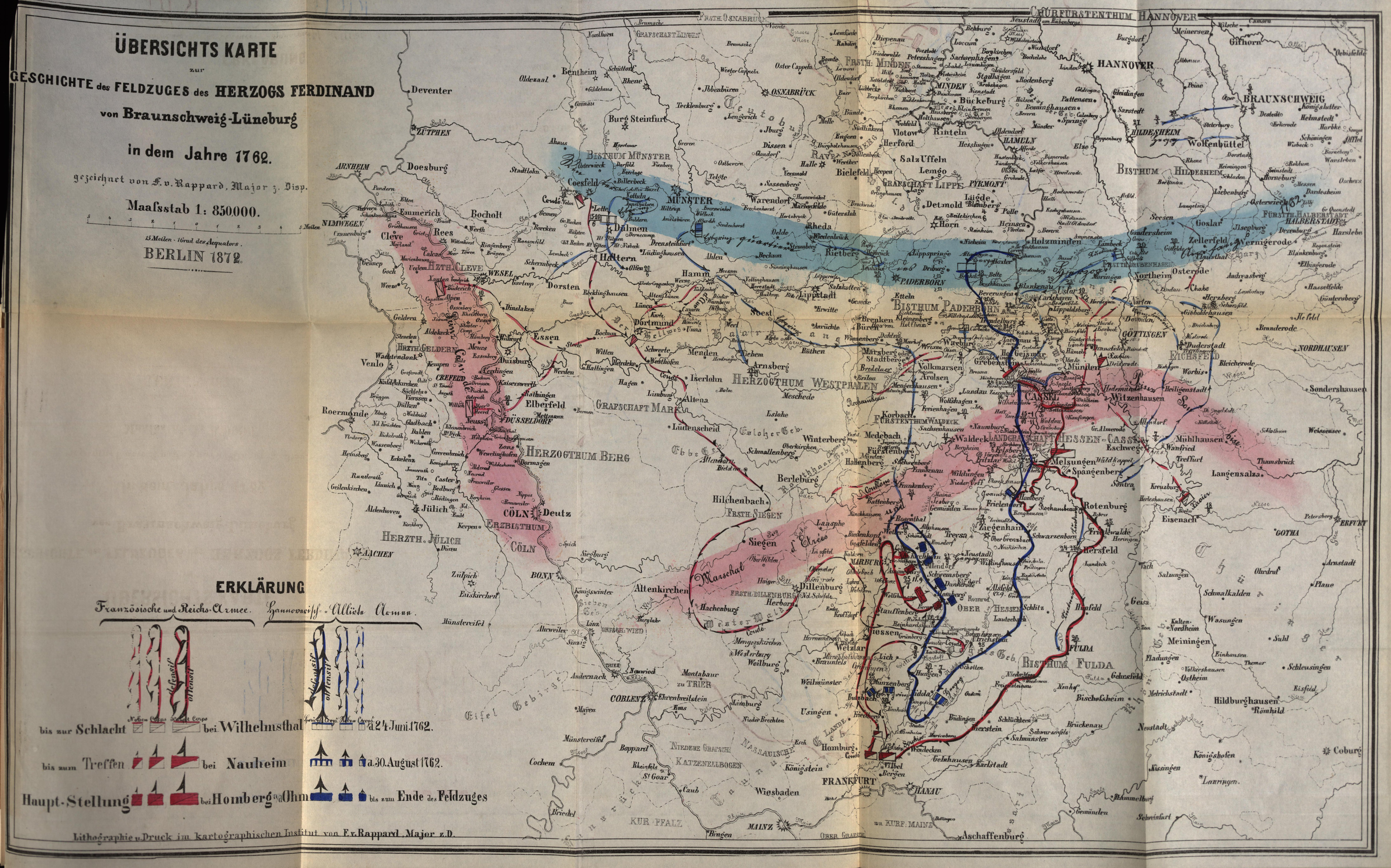
- General map of Duke Ferdinand of Brunswicks campaigns in 1762, Berlin 1872
Date	24 June 1762
Location	Castle of Wilhelmsthal near Calden, northwestern Germany
Result	Allied victory

Belligerents
Great Britain; Hanover; Prussia; Hesse-Kassel	France

Commanders and leaders
(Electorate of Brunswick-Lüneburg) Duke Ferdinand of Brunswick	(Kingdom of France) Prince de Soubise (Kingdom of France) Duc d'Estrées

Strength
50,000	70,000 (18,000 engaged)

Casualties and losses
208 killed 273 wounded 315 captured	900 killed or wounded 2,702 captured

The Battle of Wilhelmsthal (sometimes written as the Battle of Wilhelmstadt) was fought on 24 June 1762 during the Seven Years' War between the allied forces of Britain, Prussia, Hanover, Brunswick and Hesse under the command of the Duke of Brunswick against France. Once again, the French threatened Hanover, so the Allies manoeuvered around the French, surrounded the invasion force, and forced them to retreat. It was the last major action fought by Brunswick's force before the Peace of Paris brought an end to the war.

== Background ==
France had made a number of attempts to invade and overrun Hanover since 1757 in the hope of occupying the Electorate and using it as a bargaining counter to exchange for the return of French colonies captured by the British. The Allied army under the Duke of Brunswick had prevented them from taking Hanover, and by 1762, aware that the war was likely to draw to a close, the French had decided on a final thrust to try to defeat Brunswick and occupy Hanover.

== Battle ==
Ferdinand had advanced and outflanked the French on both flanks, nearly encircling them. An attack on the French center held by Stainville's command was particularly effective, with one column engaging his front, another striking his rear, inflicting some 900 casualties and forcing 2,700 to surrender.

== Aftermath ==
The result is viewed as victory for the Allied forces. It ended the last French hopes of overrunning and occupying Hanover before the armistice that ended the war and the Treaty of Paris. The Anglo-German forces advanced and captured Cassel in November, but by then, the preliminaries of peace had been signed.

== See also ==
- Great Britain in the Seven Years War
- France in the Seven Years War
