= Battle of Rheinberg =

1758 battle

Coordinates: 51.5467°N 6.6006°E

- Part of the Seven Years' War
Date	12 June 1758
Location	Rheinberg, present-day North Rhine-Westphalia
Result	Indecisive

Belligerents
(Province of Hanover) Hanover; Prussia; Hesse-Kassel	France

Commanders and leaders
(Province of Hanover) Duke of Brunswick	(Kingdom of France) Comte de Clermont

The Battle of Rheinberg took place on 12 June 1758 in Rheinberg, Germany during the Seven Years' War. A French force under the command of Comte de Clermont and a German force under the command of the Duke of Brunswick fought a largely indecisive battle. It was a precursor to the more decisive Battle of Krefeld nine days later.

== Bibliography ==
- Anderson, Fred. Crucible of War: The Seven Years' War and the Fate of Empire in British North America, 1754-1766. Faber and Faber, 2001
- McLynn, Frank. 1759: The Year Britain Became Master of the World. Pimlico, 2005.
- Simms, Brendan. Three Victories and a Defeat: The Rise and Fall of the First British Empire. Penguin Books (2008)
