= Robert Douglas (1727–1809) =

Dutch States Army officer

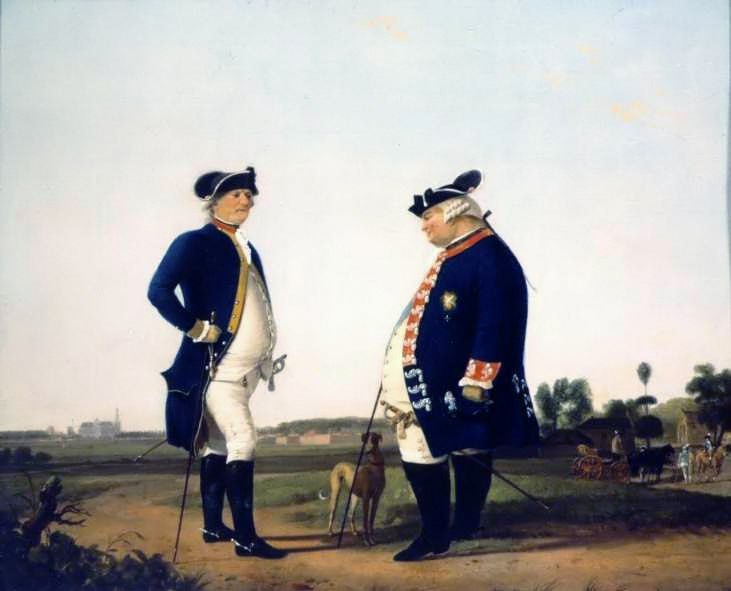
Douglas, left, with Ludwig Ernst von Brunswick-Lüneburg-Bevern, painted in 1786 by Jacobus Vrijmoet.

Robert Douglas (1727 – 1809) was a Dutch States Army officer from Scotland who was commander of the garrison city of 's-Hertogenbosch in the Dutch Republic from 1780 to 1794. He was governor there from 1784.

Douglas was a major-general from 1778, and replaced Ludwig Ernst von Brunswick-Lüneburg-Bevern at 's-Hertogenbosch. He was the son of George Douglas of Friarshaw and his wife, Elizabeth Scott (daughter of Sir Patrick Scott, Bart. of Ancrum). His grandfather was Henry Douglas, 6th laird of Friarshaw.
