= Princess Antoinette of Brunswick-Wolfenbüttel =

Duchess of Brunswick-Wolfenbüttel (1696–1762)

Antoinette of Brunswick-Wolfenbüttel
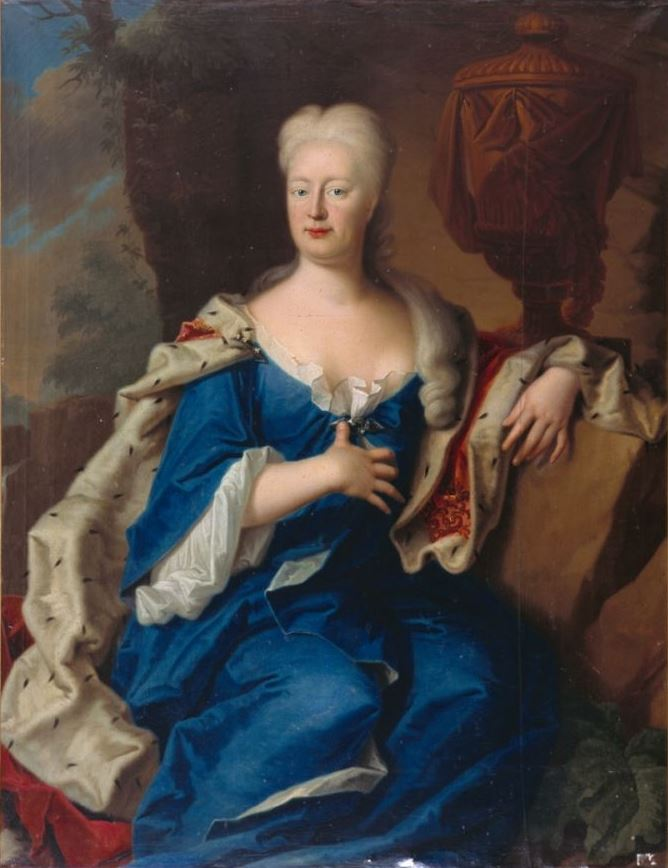
- Portrait by Christoph Bernhard Francke

Duchess consort of Brunswick-Wolfenbüttel
- Tenure: 1 March 1735 – 2 September 1735
- Born: 14 April 1696; Wolfenbüttel, Germany
- Died: 6 March 1762 (aged 65); Brunswick, Germany
- Spouse: Ferdinand Albert II, Duke of Brunswick-Wolfenbüttel (m. 1712; died 1735)
- Issue among others....: Charles I, Duke of Brunswick-Wolfenbüttel; Duke Anthony Ulrich; Elisabeth Christine, Queen of Prussia; Duke Louis Ernest; Duke Ferdinand; Luise, Princess of Prussia; Sophie, Duchess of Saxe-Coburg-Saalfeld; Teresa Natalia, Abbess of Gandersheim; Juliana Maria, Queen of Denmark; Duke Frederick Francis
- Father: Louis Rudolph, Duke of Brunswick-Wolfenbüttel
- Mother: Princess Christine Louise of Oettingen-Oettingen

Antoinette Amalie of Brunswick-Wolfenbüttel (Antoinette Amalie; 14 April 1696 – 6 March 1762) was a Duchess of Brunswick-Wolfenbüttel by marriage to Ferdinand Albert II of Brunswick-Wolfenbüttel. She was the mother of the Queen of Prussia, the Duchess of Saxe-Coburg-Saalfeld and the Queen of Denmark and Norway.

== Life ==
Antoinette Amalie was the youngest of four daughters born to Louis Rudolph of Brunswick-Wolfenbüttel and his wife Princess Christine Louise of Oettingen-Oettingen. Her older sister was Elisabeth Christine, mother of Empress Maria Theresa. Her other surviving sister Charlotte Christine was the daughter-in-law of Peter the Great of Russia.

=== Marriage ===
15 October 1712 saw her marriage to her father's first cousin Ferdinand Albert II of Brunswick-Wolfenbüttel, son of Ferdinand Albert I, Duke of Brunswick-Wolfenbüttel-Bevern and Princess Christine of Hesse-Eschwege.

The marriage was described as very happy, and Antoinette Amalie was the mother of eight sons and six daughters, 12 of whom lived to adulthood. In March 1735, her father, the Duke of Brunswick-Lüneburg, died and her husband succeeded him. Her husband himself died on September 2 of the same year. The Dowager Duchess went on to survive her husband for 27 years.

=== Death ===
After her husband's death, Antoinette Amalie lived in Antoinettenruh Castle in Wolfenbüttel, which her father Ludwig Rudolf had built for her as a summer residence. However, she died in Brunswick. Since 1762 1313 volumes from her private library are owned by the Herzog August Bibliothek.

== Issue ==
1. Charles I, Duke of Brunswick-Wolfenbüttel (1 August 1713 – 26 March 1780) married Princess Philippine Charlotte of Prussia and had issue.
2. Anthony Ulrich of Brunswick-Wolfenbüttel (28 August 1714 – 4 May 1774) married Grand Duchess Anna Leopoldovna of Russia and had issue.
3. Elisabeth Christine of Brunswick-Wolfenbüttel (8 November 1715 – 13 January 1797) married Frederick II of Prussia, no issue.
4. Louis Ernest of Brunswick-Wolfenbüttel (25 September 1718 – 12 May 1788) died unmarried.
5. August of Brunswick-Wolfenbüttel (1719–1720), died in infancy
6. Ferdinand of Brunswick-Wolfenbüttel (12 January 1721 – 3 July 1792) died unmarried.
7. Luise of Brunswick-Wolfenbüttel (29 January 1722 – 13 January 1780) married Prince Augustus William of Prussia and had issue.
8. Sophie Antoinette of Brunswick-Wolfenbüttel (13/23 January 1724 – 17 May 1802) married Ernest Frederick, Duke of Saxe-Coburg-Saalfeld and had issue.
9. Albert of Brunswick-Wolfenbüttel (1725–1745), died unmarried.
10. Charlotte Christine Louise of Brunswick-Wolfenbüttel (1725–1766) Canoness in Quedlinburg, died unmarried.
11. Theresa Natalie of Brunswick-Wolfenbüttel (4 June 1728 – 26 June 1778) Princess-Abbess of Gandersheim, died unmarried.
12. Juliana Maria of Brunswick-Wolfenbüttel (4 September 1729 – 10 October 1796) married Frederick V of Denmark and had issue.
13. Frederick William of Brunswick-Wolfenbüttel (1731–1732), died in infancy.
14. Frederick Francis of Brunswick-Wolfenbüttel (1732–1758) died unmarried.

== Ancestry ==
Ancestors of Princess Antoinette of Brunswick-Wolfenbüttel

8. Augustus II, Duke of Brunswick-Wolfenbüttel
4. Anthony Ulrich, Duke of Brunswick-Wolfenbüttel
9. Princess Dorothea of Anhalt-Zerbst
2. Louis Rudolph, Duke of Brunswick-Wolfenbüttel
10. Frederick, Duke of Schleswig-Holstein-Sonderburg-Norburg
5. Princess Elisabeth Juliana of Schleswig-Holstein-Sonderburg-Norburg
11. Princess Eleanor of Anhalt-Zerbst
1. Duchess Antoinette of Brunswick-Wolfenbüttel
12. Joachim Ernest, Count of Oettingen-Oettingen
6. Albert Ernest I, Prince of Oettingen-Oettingen
13. Countess Anna Dorothea of Hohenlohe-Neuenstein
3. Princess Christine Louise of Oettingen-Oettingen
14. Eberhard III, Duke of Württemberg
7. Duchess Christine Friederike of Württemberg
15. Wild- and Rhinegravine Anna Katharina of Salm-Kyrburg

German nobility
Preceded by Princess Christine Louise of Oettingen-Oettingen	Duchess consort of Brunswick-Wolfenbüttel; 1735–1735	Vacant Title next held by Princess Philippine Charlotte of Prussia
