= Ferdinand Albert II of Brunswick-Wolfenbüttel =

Ferdinand Albert II
- Duke of Brunswick-Wolfenbüttel
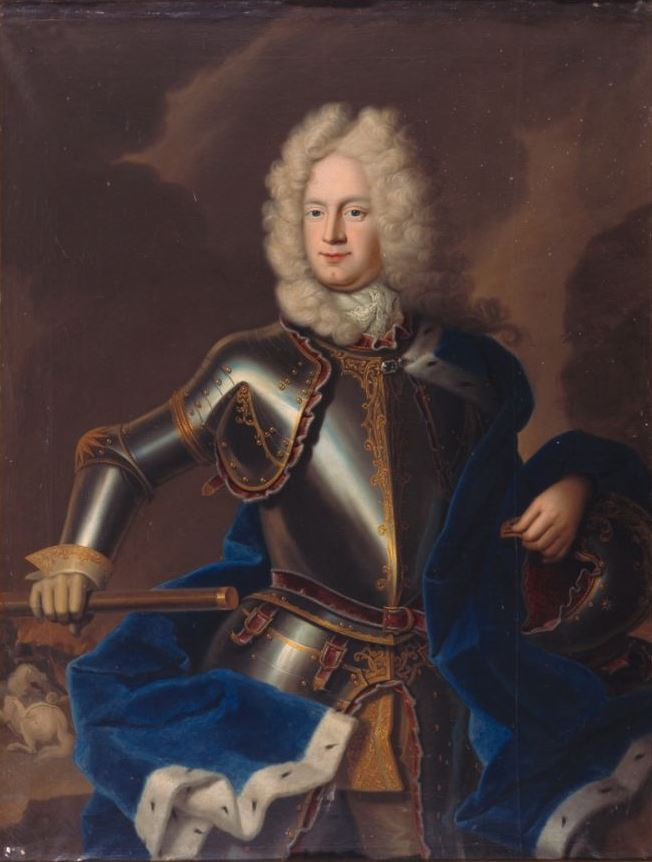
- Portrait by Christoph Bernhard Francke

Prince of Brunswick-Wolfenbüttel
- Reign: 1 March 1735 – 2 September 1735
- Predecessor: Louis Rudolph
- Successor: Charles I
- Born: 29 May 1680 (O.S.); Bevern, Principality of Brunswick-Wolfenbüttel
- Died: 2 September 1735 (aged 55) (O.S.); Salzdahlum, Principality of Brunswick-Wolfenbüttel
- Spouse: Antoinette Amalie of Brunswick-Wolfenbüttel (m. 1712)
- Issue among others....: Charles I, Duke of Brunswick-Wolfenbüttel; Duke Anthony Ulrich; Elisabeth Christine, Queen of Prussia; Duke Louis Ernest; Duke Ferdinand; Luise, Princess of Prussia; Sophie, Duchess of Saxe-Coburg-Saalfeld; Teresa Natalia, Abbess of Gandersheim; Juliana Maria, Queen of Denmark; Duke Frederick Francis
- House: Guelph
- Father: Ferdinand Albert I, Duke of Brunswick-Lüneburg
- Mother: Christina Wilhelmina of Hesse-Eschwege

Ferdinand Albert (German Ferdinand Albrecht; 29 May 1680 (O.S.), Bevern – 2 September 1735 (O.S.), Salzdahlum), Duke of Brunswick-Lüneburg, was an officer in the army of the Holy Roman Empire. He was prince of Wolfenbüttel during 1735.

== Life ==
Ferdinand Albert was the fourth son of Ferdinand Albert I, Duke of Brunswick-Lüneburg and Christina Wilhelmina of Hesse-Eschwege.

Ferdinand Albert fought on the side of Emperor Leopold I in the War of the Spanish Succession. In 1704 he became adjutant of the Emperor; in 1707 major general, and in 1711 lieutenant field marshal. During the Austro-Turkish War of 1716-18, he fought under Prince Eugene of Savoy, participated in the battles of Belgrade and Petrovaradin, and became commander of the fortress of Komárno. In 1723, he became field marshal, and in 1733, Generalfeldmarschall.

After the death of his cousin and father-in-law Louis Rudolph in March 1735, Ferdinand Albert inherited the Principality of Wolfenbüttel and resigned as field marshal. He died six months later.

== Marriage ==
Ferdinand Albert married Antoinette Amalie (1696–1762), youngest daughter of his first cousin Louis Rudolph, Duke of Brunswick-Lüneburg and his wife Princess Christine Louise of Oettingen-Oettingen, on 15 October 1712. They had 12 children who reached adulthood.

1. Charles I, Duke of Brunswick-Wolfenbüttel (1 August 1713 – 26 March 1780) married Princess Philippine Charlotte of Prussia and had issue.
2. Anthony Ulrich of Brunswick-Wolfenbüttel (28 August 1714 – 4 May 1774 (O.S.)) married Grand Duchess Anna Leopoldovna of Russia and had issue. He and his children were treated barbarically by Empress Elizabeth of Russia and he died in prison.
3. Elisabeth Christine of Brunswick-Wolfenbüttel (8 November 1715 – 13 January 1797) married Frederick the Great of Prussia, no issue.
4. Ludwig Ernest of Brunswick-Wolfenbüttel (25 September 1718 – 12 May 1788) died unmarried.
5. Ferdinand of Brunswick-Wolfenbüttel (12 January 1721 – 3 July 1792) died unmarried.
6. Luise of Brunswick-Wolfenbüttel (29 January 1722 – 13 January 1780) married Prince Augustus William of Prussia and had issue, including Frederick William II of Prussia.
7. Sophie Antoinette of Brunswick-Wolfenbüttel (13/23 January 1724 – 17 May 1802) married Ernest Frederick, Duke of Saxe-Coburg-Saalfeld and had issue.
8. Albert of Brunswick-Wolfenbüttel (4 March 1725 – 30 September 1745) died unmarried.
9. Charlotte of Brunswick-Wolfenbüttel (30 November 1726 –20 May 1766) died unmarried.
10. Theresa Natalie of Brunswick-Wolfenbüttel (4 June 1728 – 26 June 1778) died unmarried.
11. Juliana Maria of Brunswick-Wolfenbüttel (4 September 1729 – 10 October 1796) married Frederick V of Denmark and had issue.
12. Frederick William of Brunswick-Wolfenbüttel (17 January 1731 – 24 December 1732) died in infancy.
13. Frederick Francis of Brunswick-Wolfenbüttel (1732–1758) died unmarried at the Battle of Hochkirch.

== Issue ==
Note: list may be incomplete.

Issue

Name	Portrait	Lifespan	Notes
Charles I Duke of Brunswick-Wolfenbüttel		1 August 1713– 26 March 1780	Married in 1733 Princess Philippine Charlotte of Prussia, had issue
Anthony Ulrich; Duke of Brunswick		28 August 1714– 4 May 1774	Married in 1739 Grand Duchess Anna Leopoldovna of Russia, had issue
Elisabeth Christine; Queen of Prussia		8 November 1715– 13 January 1797	Married in 1733 the future King Frederick II of Prussia, no issue
Ludwig Ernest; Duke of Brunswick-Lüneburg; Duke of Courland		25 September 1718– 12 May 1788	Died unmarried
Ferdinand; Duke of Brunswick-Lüneburg		12 January 1721– 3 July 1792	Died unmarried
Louise Amalie		29 January 1722– 13 January 1780	Married in 1742 Prince Augustus William of Prussia, had issue
Sophie Antoinette; Duchess of Saxe-Coburg-Saalfeld		13/23 January 1724– 17 May 1802	Married Ernest Frederick, Duke of Saxe-Coburg-Saalfeld, had issue
Albert		1725– 1745	Died unmarried
Charlotte		1725– 1766	Died unmarried
Teresa Natalia; Abbess of Gandersheim		4 June 1728– 26 June 1778	Died unmarried
Juliana Maria; Queen of Denmark and Norway		4 September 1729– 10 October 1796	Married Frederick V of Denmark, had issue
Frederick William		1731– 1732	Died in infancy
Frederick Francis		1732– 1758	Died unmarried

== Ancestry ==
Ancestors of Ferdinand Albert II of Brunswick-Wolfenbüttel

8. Henry, Duke of Brunswick-Dannenberg
4. Augustus II, Duke of Brunswick-Wolfenbüttel
9. Princess Ursula of Saxe-Lauenburg
2. Ferdinand Albert I, Duke of Brunswick-Wolfenbüttel-Bevern
10. John Albert II, Duke of Mecklenburg-Güstrow
5. Duchess Elisabeth Sophie of Mecklenburg-Güstrow
11. Duchess Margarete Elisabeth of Mecklenburg-Gadebusch
1. Ferdinand Albert II, Duke of Brunswick-Wolfenbüttel
12. Maurice, Landgrave of Hesse-Kassel
6. Frederick, Landgrave of Hesse-Eschwege
13. Juliane of Nassau-Siegen
3. Princess Christine of Hesse-Eschwege
14. John Casimir, Count Palatine of Kleeburg
7. Countess Palatine Eleonore Katharine of Kleeburg
15. Princess Catherine of Sweden

Ferdinand Albert II of Brunswick-Wolfenbüttel House of Brunswick-Bevern Cadet branch of the House of Welf Born: 29 May 1680 Died: 13 September 1735
Regnal titles
Preceded by Ferdinand Albert I	Duke of Brunswick-Lüneburg; Prince of Bevern; 1687-1735	Succeeded by Ernest Ferdinand
Preceded by Louis Rudolph	Duke of Brunswick-Lüneburg; Prince of Brunswick-Wolfenbüttel; 1735	Succeeded by Charles I
