= Siege of Cassel (1762) =

1762 siege

- Part of Seven Years' War
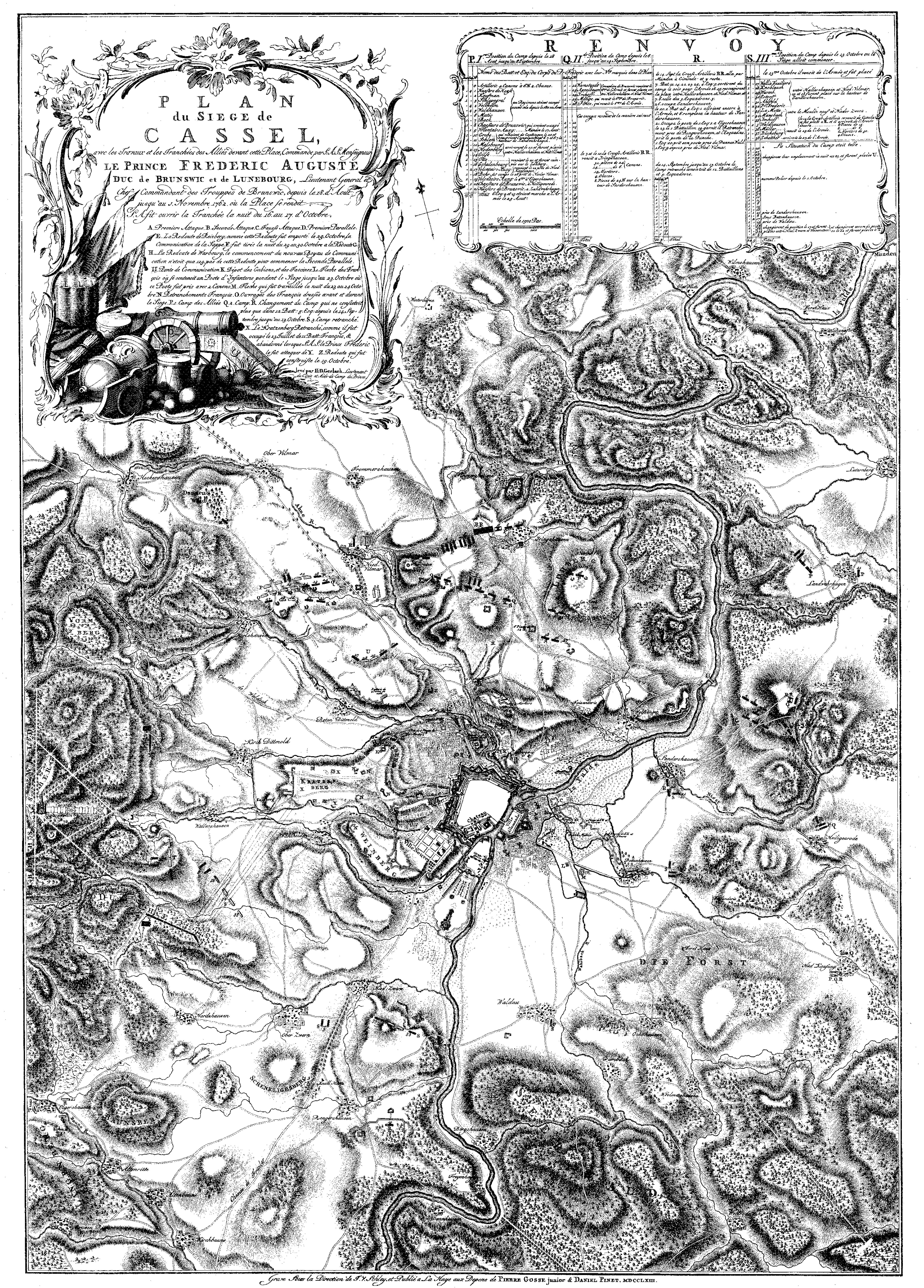
- Siege plans
Date	October – November 1762
Location	Cassel, Germany 51.316°N 9.498°E
Result	Allied victory

Belligerents
(Province of Hanover) Hanover; Brunswick; Hesse-Kassel; Great Britain	France

Commanders and leaders
Duke Ferdinand of Brunswick	Unknown

Strength
Unknown	5,800

The Siege of Cassel took place in October and November 1762, when an allied force of Hanoverian, Hessian and British troops under the command of the Duke of Brunswick besieged and captured the French-held town of Cassel. It was the final engagement of the Seven Years' War in Western Europe, as the conflict was brought to an end by the Peace of Paris the following year.

News of the town's capture arrived after the preliminaries of the peace treaty had been signed in Paris, so it did not have the dramatic impact that Brunswick had hoped for. It was acknowledged that the garrison's unexpectedly long resistance had allowed the French to negotiate from a much stronger position.

== See also ==
- Great Britain in the Seven Years War

== Bibliography ==
- Dull, Jonathan R. The French Navy and the Seven Years' War. University of Nebraska, 2005.
