= Castle Salzdahlum =

Summer palace in Germany, 1684 to 1813

Coordinates: 52°11′32″N 10°34′58″E

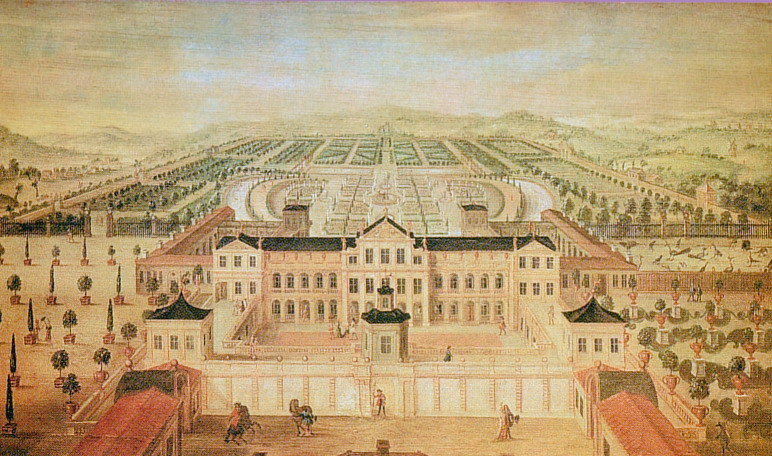
Schloss with Baroque garden, 1721

Castle Salzdahlum (German: Schloss Salzdahlum) was a former summer palace built by Anthony Ulrich, Duke of Brunswick-Wolfenbüttel in 1684. For cost reasons, the buildings were almost exclusively made of wood, with the cladding giving the impression of a building made of sandstone. In 1813 the castle was demolished due to dilapidation; today there are almost no remains of the building.

== Background ==
Located in the Electorate of Saxony between Braunschweig and Wolfenbüttel, the palace was the location where Frederick II of Prussia married Elisabeth Christine of Brunswick-Wolfenbüttel, Queen of Prussia in 1733. The large art collection that used to be kept there is largely intact and can be viewed locally at the Herzog Anton Ulrich Museum.
