= Elisabeth Juliane of Schleswig-Holstein-Sonderburg-Norburg =

Duchess of Brunswick-Wolfenbuttel (1634–1704)

Princess Elizabeth Juliane of Schleswig-Holstein-Sønderburg-Nordborg
- Duchess of Brunswick-Wolfenbüttel
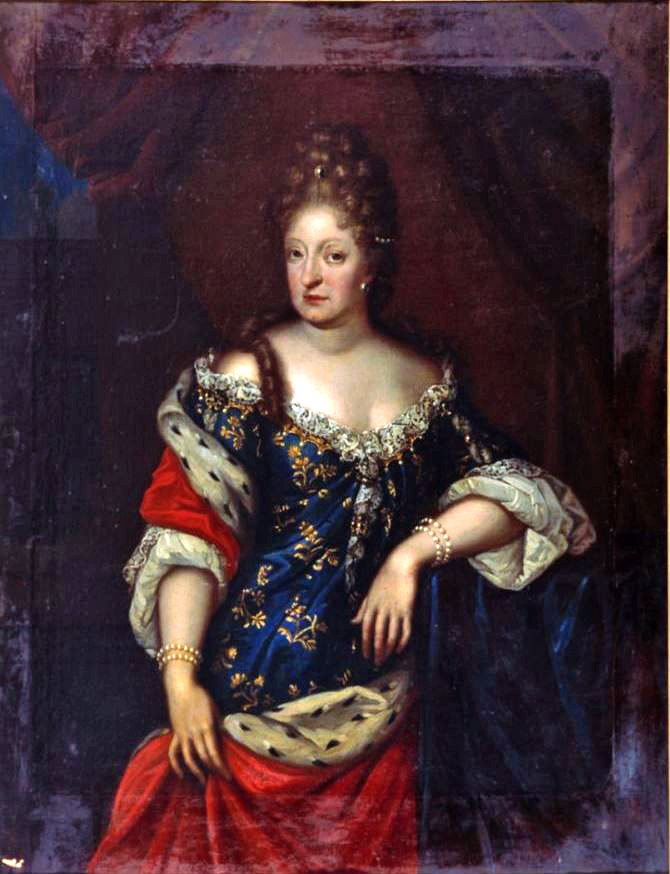
- Undated portrait of The Duchess of Brunswick-Wolfenbüttel by a member of a German school.
- Born: 24 May 1634; Nordborg, Duchy of Schleswig
- Died: 4 February 1704 (aged 69); Wolfenbüttel, Brunswick-Lüneburg
- Buried: Marienkirche, Wolfenbüttel
- Noble family: Oldenburg
- Spouse: Anthony Ulrich, Duke of Brunswick-Wolfenbüttel
- Issue: August Friedrich, Hereditary Prince of Brunswick-Wolfenbüttel; Elisabeth Eleanore Sophie, Duchess of Saxe-Meiningen; Anna Sophie, Princess Karl Gustav of Baden-Durlach; Augustus William, Duke of Brunswick-Lüneburg; Augusta Dorothea, Countess of Schwarzburg-Sondershausen-Arnstadt; Henrietta Christine, Abbess of Gandersheim; Louis Rudolph
- Father: Frederick, Duke of Schleswig-Holstein-Sønderburg-Norburg
- Mother: Eleanor of Anhalt-Zerbst

Princess Elizabeth Juliane of Schleswig-Holstein-Sønderburg-Nordborg (24 May 1634 – 4 February 1704) was a Danish princess and a member of the House of Schleswig-Holstein-Sonderburg-Norburg by birth and a member of the House of Welf by marriage.

== Life ==
Elizabeth Juliane was born in Nordborg as the oldest daughter of Frederick, Duke of Schleswig-Holstein-Sønderburg-Norburg, the sovereign duke of Schleswig-Holstein-Sonderburg-Norburg and his second wife Eleanor of Anhalt-Zerbst. Her paternal grandparents were John II, Duke of Schleswig-Holstein-Sonderburg and Duchess Elisabeth of Brunswick-Grubenhagen. Her maternal grandparents were Rudolph, Prince of Anhalt-Zerbst (1576–1621) and Princess Dorothea Hedwig (1587–1609).

Together with her husband, she founded a monastery for noblewomen at Schloss Salzdahlum in 1699, and then selected the monastery's first conventual women herself.

Elisabeth Juliane died at Salzdahlum on 4 February 1704 and was buried in the crypt of the Wolfenbüttel in Marienkirche, Wolfenbüttel.

== Marriage and children ==
On 17 August 1656, Elizabeth Juliane married her cousin Anthony Ulrich, Duke of Brunswick-Wolfenbüttel. They had 13 children, seven of whom reached adulthood:

- Augustus Frederick (1657–1676)
- Elizabeth Eleanor Sophie (1658–1729), married John George, Duke of Mecklenburg-Mirow and Bernhard I, Duke of Saxe-Meiningen
- Anne Sophie (1659–1742), married Charles Gustav of Baden-Durlach
- Leopold Augustus (1661-1662), died in infancy
- Augustus William (1662–1731)
- Augustus Henry (1663-1664), died in infancy
- Augustus Charles (1664-1664), died in infancy
- Augustus Francis (1665-1666), died in infancy
- Augusta Dorothea (1666–1751), married Anton Günther II, Count of Schwarzburg-Sondershausen-Arnstadt
- Amalia (1668-1668), died in infancy
- Henrietta Christina, Abbess of Gandersheim (1669–1753)
- Louis Rudolph (1671–1735)
- Sibylla Ursula (1672-1673), died in infancy

Elizabeth Juliane also suffered four miscarriages:

- A miscarried daughter (1660)
- A miscarried daughter (1667)
- A miscarried son (1670)
- A miscarried son (1674)
