= Louis Rudolph, Duke of Brunswick =

Louis Rudolph
- Duke of Brunswick-Lüneburg; Prince of Wolfenbüttel
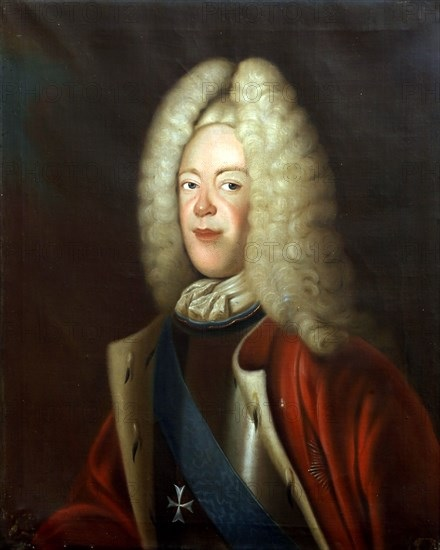

Prince of Brunswick-Wolfenbüttel
- Reign: 23 March 1731 – 1 March 1735
- Predecessor: Augustus William
- Successor: Ferdinand Albert II
- Born: 22 July 1671; Wolfenbüttel, Brunswick-Lüneburg
- Died: 1 March 1735 (aged 63); Brunswick, Brunswick-Lüneburg
- Burial: Brunswick Cathedral
- Spouse: Princess Christine Louise of Oettingen-Oettingen (m. 1690)
- Issue: Elisabeth Christine, Holy Roman Empress; Charlotte Christine, Tsarevna of Russia; Antoinette, Duchess of Brunswick-Wolfenbüttel
- House: House of Welf
- Father: Anthony Ulrich, Duke of Brunswick-Wolfenbüttel
- Mother: Elisabeth Juliane of Schleswig-Holstein-Sonderburg-Norburg

Louis Rudolph (German: Ludwig Rudolf; 22 July 1671 – 1 March 1735), a member of the House of Welf, was Duke of Brunswick-Lüneburg and ruling Prince of Wolfenbüttel from 1731 until his death. Since 1707, he ruled as an immediate Prince of Blankenburg.

Louis Rudolph was the maternal grandfather of Empress Maria Theresa, Emperor Peter II of Russia and Charles I, Duke of Brunswick-Wolfenbüttel.

== Life ==
Louis Rudolph was the youngest son of Duke Anthony Ulrich of Brunswick-Wolfenbüttel and his consort Princess Elisabeth Juliane of Schleswig-Holstein-Sonderburg-Norburg, daughter of Duke Frederick of Schleswig-Holstein-Sonderburg-Norburg. He became a major general in the service of the Habsburg emperor Leopold I in 1690 and was promptly captured in the Battle of Fleurus by the forces of King Louis XIV of France. After being released the same year, his father gave him the Brunswick County of Blankenburg as a present, with the consent of his eldest son Augustus William, insofar violating the primogeniture principle laid down by the late Duke Henry V.

When in 1707 Prince Anthony Ulrich managed to betroth Louis Rudolph's daughter Elisabeth Christine to the Habsburg archduke Charles VI, his elder brother Emperor Joseph I raised the County of Blankenburg to an immediate principality. Louis Rudolph's status as an Imperial prince (Reichsfürst), however, was limited as his vote in the Imperial Diet was not hereditary and depending on the Welf Electorate of Brunswick-Lüneburg (Calenberg line).

On the death of brother Augustus William in 1731, Louis Rudolph also inherited Wolfenbüttel, thus ruling both principalities in personal union. He relocated his residence to Wolfenbüttel, the capital of the inherited bigger principality. In the few years of his rule, Louis Rudolph managed to restore the finances, after Augustus William had almost ruined the state.

Louis Rudolph died without male issue in 1735. He was succeeded by his first cousin, Duke Ferdinand Albert II, who had married Louis Rudolph's youngest daughter, Antoinette Amalie.

== Family ==
Louis Rudolph married Christine Louise, daughter of Albert Ernest I, Prince of Öttingen-Öttingen, at Aurich in 1690. They had four daughters, but only three reached adulthood:

- Elisabeth Christine of Brunswick-Wolfenbüttel (1691–1750), married Archduke Charles VI of Austria, crowned Holy Roman Empress in 1711, mother of Empress Maria Theresa.
- Charlotte Auguste (23 July 1692 – 8 August 1692) died in infancy.
- Charlotte Christine of Brunswick-Wolfenbüttel (1694–1715), married Tsarevich Alexei Petrovich of Russia, son and heir of Peter the Great and was the mother of Emperor Peter II of Russia.
- Antoinette Amalie of Brunswick-Wolfenbüttel (14 April 1696 – 6 March 1762), married Duke Ferdinand Albert II of Brunswick-Lüneburg who succeeded her father in 1735.

Many members of modern and contemporary European royalty are descendants of Louis Rudolph. In particular, with the exception of Albert II, Prince of Monaco, Louis Rudolph is an ancestor of all current sovereigns of hereditary European monarchies.

== Ancestry ==
Ancestors of Louis Rudolph, Duke of Brunswick

8. Henry, Duke of Brunswick-Dannenberg
4. Augustus II, Duke of Brunswick-Wolfenbüttel
9. Princess Ursula of Saxe-Lauenburg
2. Anthony Ulrich, Duke of Brunswick-Wolfenbüttel
10. Rudolph, Prince of Anhalt-Zerbst
5. Princess Dorothea of Anhalt-Zerbst
11. Duchess Dorothea Hedwig of Brunswick-Wolfenbüttel
1. Louis Rudolph, Duke of Brunswick-Wolfenbüttel
12. John II, Duke of Schleswig-Holstein-Sonderburg
6. Frederick, Duke of Schleswig-Holstein-Sonderburg-Norburg
13. Duchess Elisabeth of Brunswick-Grubenhagen
3. Princess Elisabeth Juliana of Schleswig-Holstein-Sonderburg-Norburg
14. Rudolph, Prince of Anhalt-Zerbst (= 10)
7. Princess Eleanor of Anhalt-Zerbst
15. Duchess Dorothea Hedwig of Brunswick-Wolfenbüttel (= 11)

Louis Rudolph, Duke of Brunswick House of Welf Cadet branch of the House of Este Born: 22 July 1671 Died: 1 March 1735
German nobility
Preceded by Augustus William	Duke of Brunswick-Lüneburg; Prince of Brunswick-Wolfenbüttel; 1731–1735	Succeeded by Ferdinand Albert II
