= Princess Christine Louise of Oettingen-Oettingen =

Princess Christine Louise

Duchess consort of Brunswick-Wolfenbüttel
- Tenure: 23 March 1731 – 1 March 1735
- Born: 20 March 1671; Oettingen
- Died: 3 September 1747 (aged 76); Blankenberg
- Spouse: Louis Rudolph I, Duke of Brunswick-Lüneburg (m. 1690; died 1735)
- Issue: Elisabeth Christine, Holy Roman Empress; Charlotte Christine, Tsarevna of Russia; Antoinette, Duchess of Brunswick-Wolfenbüttel
- House: Oettingen-Oettingen
- Father: Albert Ernest I, Prince of Oettingen-Oettingen
- Mother: Duchess Christine Friederike of Württemberg

Christine Louise of Oettingen-Oettingen (20 March 1671 – 3 September 1747) was Duchess of Brunswick-Lüneburg. She was the maternal grandmother of Holy Roman Empress Maria Theresa, Emperor Peter II of Russia and also Charles I, Duke of Brunswick-Wolfenbüttel.

== Early life ==
Christine Louise was born as the third daughter of Albert Ernest I, Prince of Öttingen-Öttingen and his first wife, Duchess Christine Friederike of Württemberg, daughter of Eberhard III, Duke of Württemberg and his first wife Anna Katharina, Wild- and Rheingräfin of Salm-Kyrburg.

== Marriage ==
She married Louis Rudolph, Duke of Brunswick-Lüneburg at Aurich in 1690. They had four daughters, but only three reached adulthood:

- Princess Elisabeth Christine (1691–1750), married Charles VI, Holy Roman Emperor.
- Princess Charlotte Auguste (1692–1692)
- Princess Charlotte Christine (1694–1715), married Alexei Petrovich, Tsarevich of Russia, Peter the Great's son and heir.
- Antoinette Amalie, Duchess of Brunswick-Wolfenbüttel (1696–1762), who married in 1712 her cousin Prince Ferdinand Albert of Brunswick-Lüneburg, heir of her father.

The marriages of her three daughters were arranged by her ambitious father-in-law, Anthony Ulrich, Duke of Brunswick-Wolfenbüttel.

== Ancestry ==
Ancestors of Princess Christine Louise of Oettingen-Oettingen

8. Ludwig Eberhard of Oettingen
4. Joachim Ernst of Oettingen
9. Margarethe of Erbach
2. Albert Ernest I, Prince of Oettingen
10. Kraft VII of Hohenlohe-Neuenstein
5. Anna Dorothea of Hohenlohe-Neuenstein-Gleichen
11. Sophie of Palatinate-Zweibrücken-Birkenfeld
1. Christine Louise of Oettingen-Oettingen
12. John Frederick, Duke of Württemberg
6. Eberhard III, Duke of Württemberg
13. Barbara Sophie of Brandenburg
3. Christine of Württemberg
14. Johann Kasimir of Salm-Kyrburg
7. Anna Catharina of Salm-Kyrburg
15. Dorothea of Solms-Laubach

== Sources ==
- Christina Louise Prinzessin v.Oettingen-Oettingen

Princess Christine Louise of Oettingen-Oettingen House of Oettingen-Oettingen Born: 20 March 1671 Died: 3 September 1747
German royalty
Preceded by Princess Elisabeth Sophie Marie of Schleswig-Holstein-Sonderborg-Norburg	Duchess consort of Brunswick-Wolfenbüttel; 1731–1735	Vacant Title next held by Princess Philippine Charlotte of Prussia
