= Charles I of Brunswick-Wolfenbüttel =

Charles I
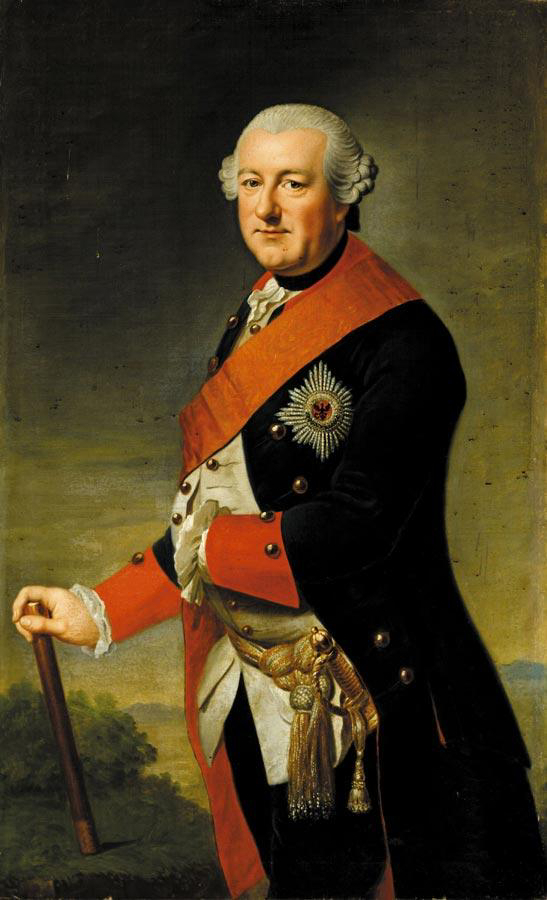
- Portrait by Johann Georg Ziesenis

Prince of Brunswick-Wolfenbüttel
- Reign: 2 September 1735 – 26 March 1780
- Predecessor: Ferdinand Albert II
- Successor: Charles William Ferdinand
- Born: 1 August 1713; Brunswick
- Died: 26 March 1780 (aged 66); Brunswick
- Spouse: Princess Philippine Charlotte of Prussia (m. 1733)
- Issue: Charles William Ferdinand, Duke of Brunswick; Prince Georg Franz; Sophie, Margravine of Brandenburg-Bayreuth; Prince Christian Ludwig; Anna, Duchess of Saxe-Weimar-Eisenach; Prince Frederick Augustus; Prince Albrecht Heinrich; Princess Louise; Prince Wilhelm Adolf; Elisabeth Christine, Crown Princess of Prussia; Princess Friederike; Augusta Dorothea, Abbess of Gandersheim; Prince Maximilian Julius Leopold; Christian Theodor von Pincier (illegitimate)
- House: House of Guelph
- Father: Ferdinand Albert II, Duke of Brunswick-Wolfenbüttel
- Mother: Duchess Antoinette of Brunswick-Wolfenbüttel

Charles (German: Karl; 1 August 1713 in Braunschweig – 26 March 1780 in Braunschweig), Duke of Brunswick-Lüneburg (Bevern line), reigned as Prince of Brunswick-Wolfenbüttel from 1735 until his death.

== Life ==
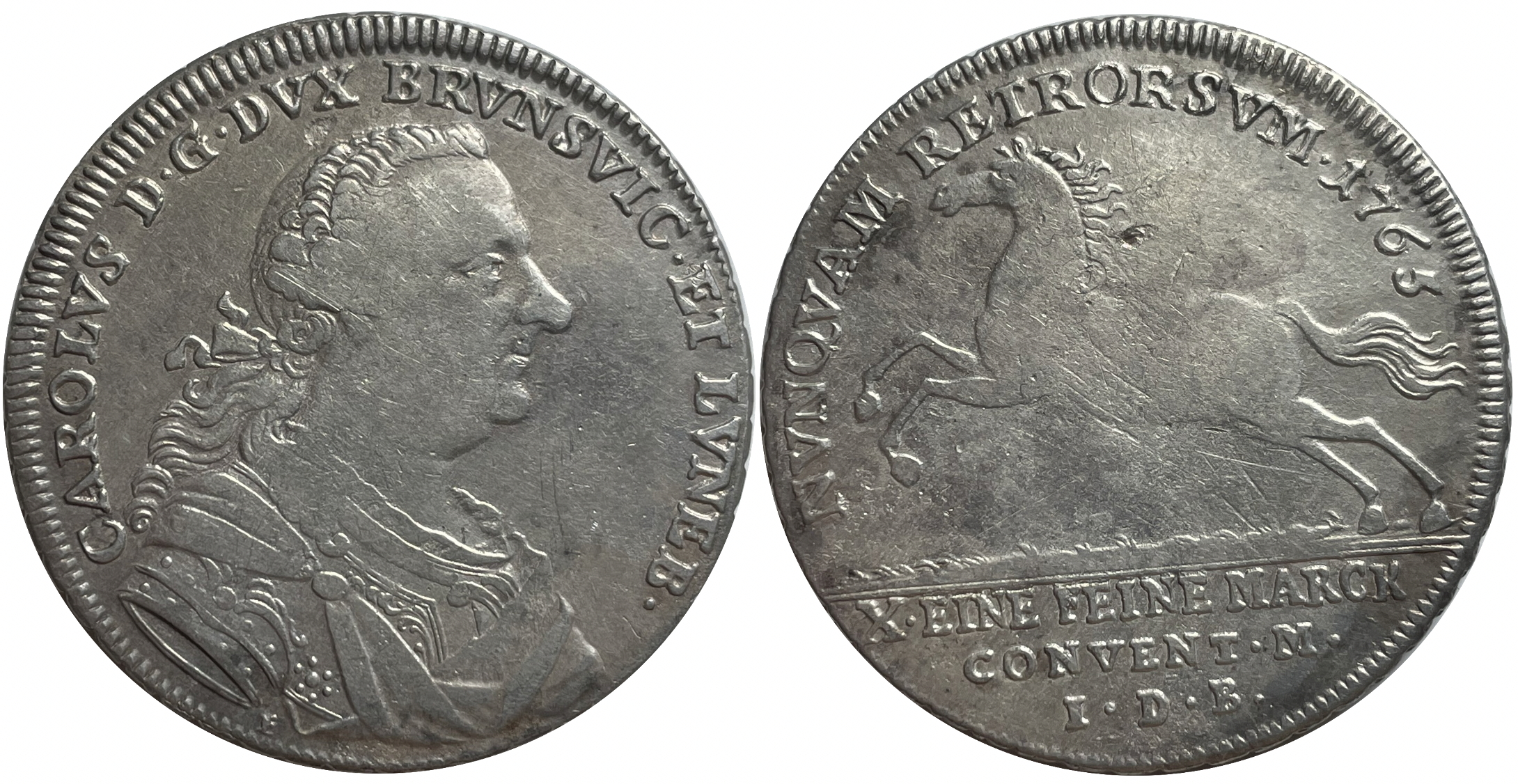
Silver coin of Charles I, dated 1765.

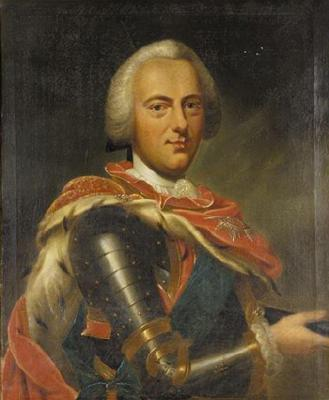
Painting by Antoine Pesne

Charles was born on 1 August 1713 in Braunschweig, the eldest son of Ferdinand Albert II, Duke of Brunswick-Wolfenbüttel. He fought under Prince Eugene of Savoy against the Ottoman Empire before inheriting the Principality of Brunswick-Wolfenbüttel from his father in 1735. Through his mother he was first cousins with Empress Maria Theresa.

On the suggestion of his court-preacher, Johann Friedrich Wilhelm Jerusalem, in 1745 he founded the Collegium Carolinum, an institute of higher education which is today known as TU Braunschweig. He also hired Gotthold Ephraim Lessing as the librarian for the Bibliotheca Augusta, the ducal library. Lorenz Heister of the University of Helmstedt named the botanical genus Brunsvigia in his honour, in recognition of his encouragement of botany and the study of B. orientalis.

Charles attempted to promote the economic development of his state; for example, he founded the Fürstenberg Porcelain Company, and he installed mandatory fire insurance. However, he did not manage to keep the state finances in check. As a consequence, in 1773 his eldest son Charles William Ferdinand took over government.

When the American Revolution began in 1775, Prince Charles saw an opportunity to replenish the duchy's treasury by renting its army to Great Britain. In 1776, Duke Charles signed a treaty with his cousin George III of Great Britain to supply troops for service with the British armies in America. 4,000 soldiers were dispatched under General Friedrich Adolf Riedesel. The Brunswick troops fought in General John Burgoyne's army at the Battles of Saratoga (1777), where they were taken prisoner as part of the Convention Army. Although the terms of surrender allowed the troops to return to Europe, the American Continental Congress cancelled the convention. The Convention Army was held prisoner in America until the war ended in 1783.

Charles died on 26 March 1780 in Braunschweig.

== Marriage and children ==
In 1733, Charles married Philippine Charlotte, daughter of King Frederick William I of Prussia and sister of Frederick the Great. They had the following children that reached adulthood:

- Charles William Ferdinand (1735–1806), father of Queen Caroline of Brunswick, wife of George IV of the United Kingdom.
- Sophie Caroline Mary (1737–1817), married Frederick, Margrave of Brandenburg-Bayreuth
- Anna Amalia (1739–1807), married Ernest Augustus II, Duke of Saxe-Weimar-Eisenach
- Frederick Augustus (1740–1805)
- Albert Henry (26 February 1742 – 8 August 1761), died childless
- William Adolf (18 May 1745 – 24 August 1770), died childless
- Elizabeth Christine Ulrike (1746–1840), married King Frederick William II of Prussia (divorced). She was the mother of Frederica, Duchess of York.
- Augusta Dorothea, Abbess of Gandersheim (1749–1803)
- Maximilian Jules Leopold (1752–1785), died childless

Charles also had a child out of wedlock, Christian Theodor (1750–1824), who later took the name de Pencier after his step-father.

== Ancestry ==
Ancestors of Charles I of Brunswick-Wolfenbüttel

8. Augustus II, Duke of Brunswick-Wolfenbüttel
4. Ferdinand Albert I, Duke of Brunswick-Wolfenbüttel-Bevern
9. Duchess Elisabeth Sophie of Mecklenburg-Gustrow
2. Ferdinand Albert II, Duke of Brunswick-Wolfenbüttel
10. Frederick, Landgrave of Hesse-Eschwege
5. Princess Christine of Hesse-Eschwege
11. Countess Palatine Eleonora Catherine of Zweibrücken
1. Charles I, Duke of Brunswick-Wolfenbüttel
12. Anthony Ulrich, Duke of Brunswick-Wolfenbüttel
6. Louis Rudolph, Duke of Brunswick-Wolfenbüttel
13. Princess Elisabeth Juliana of Schleswig-Holstein-Sonderburg-Norburg
3. Duchess Antoinette of Brunswick-Wolfenbüttel
14. Albert Ernest I, Prince of Oettingen-Oettingen
7. Princess Christine Louise of Oettingen-Oettingen
15. Duchess Christine Friederike of Württemberg

Charles I of Brunswick-Wolfenbüttel House of Brunswick-Bevern Cadet branch of the House of Welf Born: 1 August 1713 Died: 26 March 1780
Regnal titles
Preceded by Ferdinand Albert II	Duke of Brunswick-Lüneburg; Prince of Brunswick-Wolfenbüttel; 1735–1780	Succeeded by Charles William Ferdinand
