= Frederick Augustus, Prince of Brunswick-Wolfenbüttel-Oels =

German nobleman and Prussian general

Frederick Augustus of Braunschweig-Wolfenbüttel
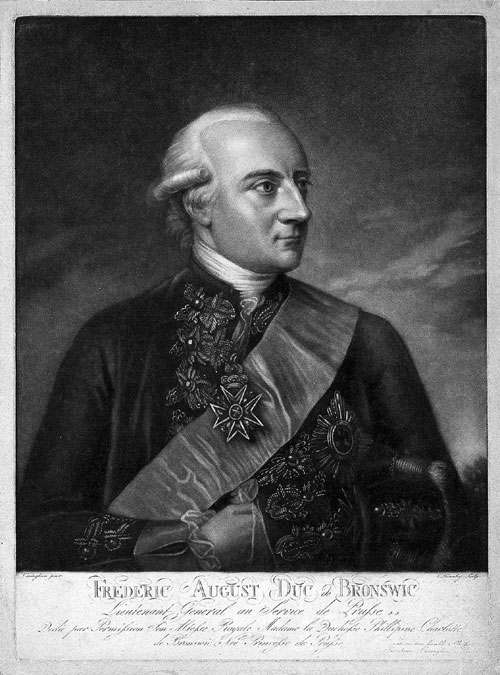
- Frederic August Duc de Bronswic Lieutenant General au Service de Prusse etc. (Frederick Augustus, Duke of Brunswick, lieutenant-general in the Prussian service etc.), contemporary engraving after Edward Francis Cunningham)
- Born: 29 October 1740; Wolfenbüttel, Germany
- Died: 8 October 1805; Eisenach, Germany
- Allegiance: Prussia
- Rank: General of Infantry
- Known for: Commanding Prussian Army, Freemasonry
- Awards: Order of the Black Eagle
- Spouse(s): Princess Friederike Sophie Charlotte Auguste of Württemberg-Oels (m. 1768)

Frederick Augustus of Braunschweig-Wolfenbüttel (29 October 1740, Wolfenbüttel – 8 October 1805, Eisenach) was a German nobleman and Prussian general. A prince of Braunschweig-Wolfenbüttel and thus one of the Dukes of Brunswick-Lüneburg, in 1792 he was granted the Duchy of Oels and the Duchy of Bernstadt and thus also became the ruling duke of these duchies.

== Life ==
One of thirteen children of Charles I, Duke of Brunswick-Wolfenbüttel and his wife Princess Philippine Charlotte of Prussia, in 1754 he became a captain in the Brunswick-Wolfenbüttel Lifeguard regiment and on 28 April 1761 became an oberst and commander of the Zastrow Foot Regiment. During the Seven Years' War he fought at Vellinghausen, Wilhelmsthal, Melsungen, Homburg and Fritzlar. On 17 August 1761 he was made a major general and in October that year fought at Ölper and thus in the liberation of the city of Brunswick from its last siege. In her ode Über den Entsatz von Braunschweig (1761), Anna Luise Karsch wrote:

Give me fresh laurels on my lyre / For I glow with heroes' fire / Sing, my song, of Brunswick's younger victor! / Frederick, his brother's brave avenger.

In 1764 she followed it with an Ode über die Vorzüge des Prinzen Friedrichs von Braunschweig.

He and two of his brothers (Wilhelm Adolf and Leopold) were freemasons and from 1771 he was a Socius, Amicus et Fautor ordinis member of the Rite of Strict Observance, in which he was made Prefect of the Temple (Berlin) in 1773 as Superior und Protector ordinis. From 1772 to 1799 he was made National Grand Master of the Grand National Mother Lodge 'Zu den drei Weltkugeln', another of whose members was Frederick II of Prussia. The Freimaurerlexikon of 1932 states he had a strong mystical predisposition and called him an alchemist, Rosicrucian, exorcist and miracle-working doctor, in constant contact with the "great swindlers of the order" (namely Gottlieb Franz Xaver Gugomos and the Leipzig cafe owner Schröpfer). With his uncle Duke Ferdinand of Brunswick and despite warnings from Du Bosc and Karl Eberhard von Wächter, he kept in contact with the Count of Saint Germain, an internationally-famous alchemist and occultist.

In 1763 Frederick Augustus became a lieutenant general and commander of the Tettenborn Foot Regiment (later 19th Regiment) in Prussian service, becoming a favourite of his uncle Frederick II of Prussia and from then on always accompanying him on manoeuvres. He was also made governor of the fortress at Küstrin. On 1 October 1763 he was made a knight of the Order of the Black Eagle. On 20 December 1764 he was made an honorary member of the Prussian Academy of Sciences.

On 6 September 1768 he married Princess Friederike Sophie Charlotte Auguste of Württemberg-Oels (1 August 1751 – 4 November 1789), daughter of Charles Christian Erdmann, Duke of Württemberg-Oels (1716–1792), though the marriage remained childless right up to her death in 1789. In 1774 he was appointed provost of Brandenburg. On 21 May 1787 he was made a General of Infantry and on 13 December 1792 he was made duke of Oels in Lower Silesia. On 28 December that year he was put in command of a Prussian army corps intended to be deployed in Westphalia, but for health reasons he first delegated the command to lieutenant general Knobelsdorff on 26 March 1793 and then on 20 March 1794 was finally dismissed. He then retired to his Schloss Sibyllenort in Lower Silesia to translate French plays and to literary works. He died in October 1805 while visiting his sister Anna Amalia in Eisenach, and was buried in Weimar. The duchy of Oels passed to his nephew Frederick William, Duke of Brunswick-Wolfenbüttel, the so-called 'Black Duke'.

== Works ==
- Militärische Geschichte des Prinzen Friedrich August von Braunschweig-Lüneburg, Oels 1797

== Bibliography ==
- (in German) Hermann Hengst: Die Ritter des Schwarzen Adlerordens. 1901
- (in German) Benno von Knobelsdorff-Brenkenhoff: Die Städte Braunschweig und Wolfenbüttel und das Gefecht bei Ölper am 13./14.10.1761, In: Braunschweigisches Jahrbuch Nr. 71, Braunschweig 1990, S. 7–26
- (in German) Eugen Lennhoff, Oskar Posner: Internationales Freimaurerlexikon. 1932
- (in German) Ferdinand Spehr: Friedrich August (Herzog von Braunschweig). In: Allgemeine Deutsche Biographie (ADB). Band 7, Duncker & Humblot, Leipzig 1877, S. 505–507.
