= Princess Frederica Charlotte of Prussia =

Frederica Charlotte of Prussia
- Duchess of York and Albany
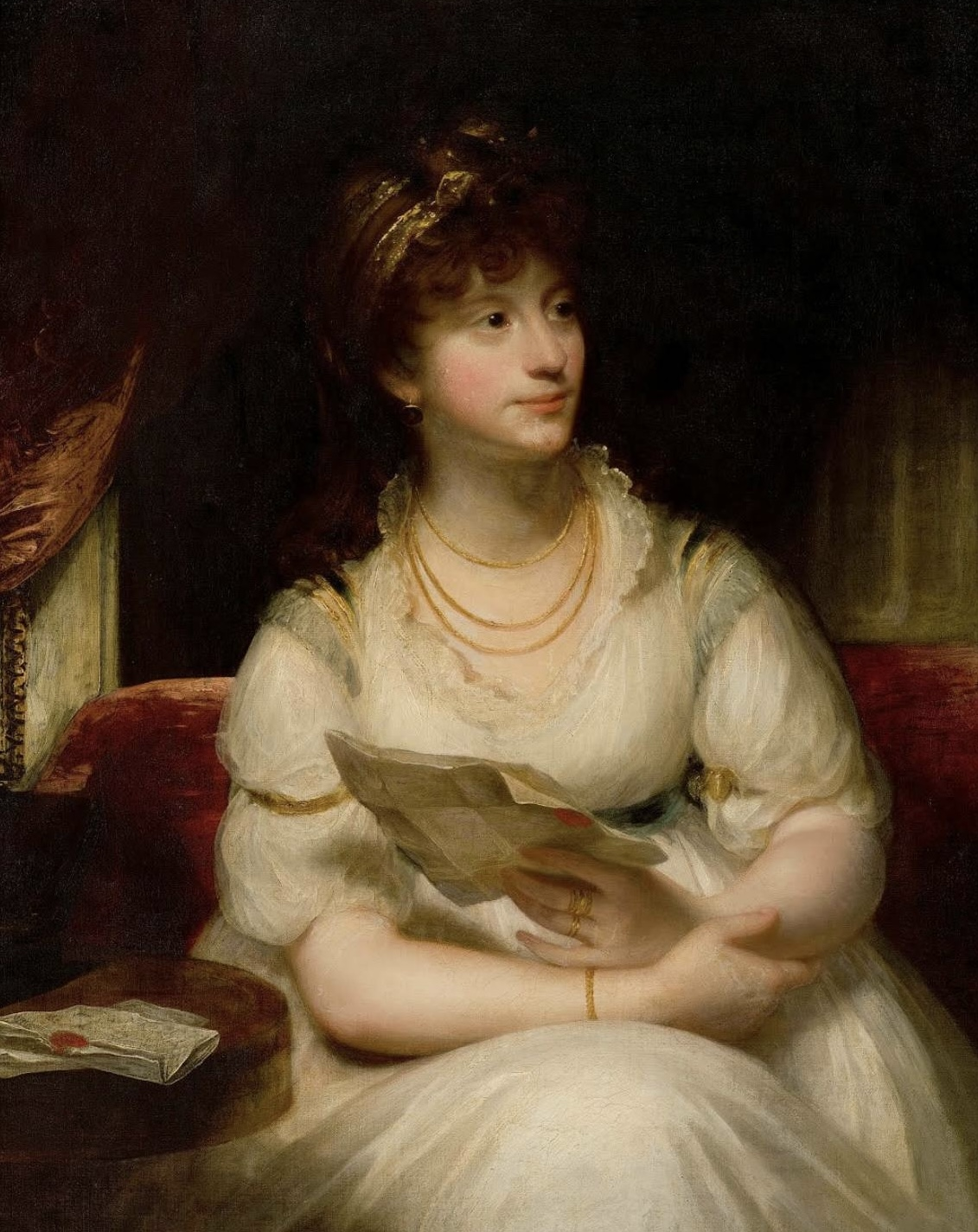
- Portrait by William Beechey, 1797
- Born: 7 May 1767; Charlottenburg, Germany
- Died: 6 August 1820 (aged 53); Oatlands Park, Surrey, England
- Burial: 13 August 1820; St James's Church, Weybridge
- Spouse: Prince Frederick, Duke of York and Albany (m. 1791)
Names
- Frederica Charlotte Ulrika Katharina
- House: Hohenzollern
- Father: Frederick William II of Prussia
- Mother: Elisabeth Christine Ulrike of Brunswick-Wolfenbüttel

Princess Frederica Charlotte of Prussia (Friederike Charlotte Ulrike Katharina; 7 May 1767 – 6 August 1820) was a Prussian princess by birth and a British princess by marriage. She was the eldest daughter of King Frederick William II of Prussia and the wife of Prince Frederick, Duke of York and Albany, second son of King George III of the United Kingdom.

== Early life ==
Born in Charlottenburg on 7 May 1767, Frederica Charlotte was the eldest child of the future Frederick William II of Prussia, and the only child of his first wife and cousin, Elisabeth Christine of Brunswick-Lüneburg.

At the time of her birth, Frederica's childless granduncle Frederick the Great was on the throne of Prussia. Her father was the King's nephew and heir presumptive, while her mother was also the King's niece. Their union was extremely unhappy due to their mutual infidelities. After several affairs with musicians and officers, Frederica's mother became pregnant in 1769. She then plotted to escape from Prussia with her lover, but she was betrayed and captured, causing a public scandal. A divorce was quickly granted, and Elisabeth Christine was placed under house arrest in the castle of Stettin, where she remained for the next seventy-one years, until she died aged 93 in 1840, twenty years after the death of her only child, Frederica Charlotte.

Frederica Charlotte was two years old at the time of her mother's disgrace, and never saw her mother again. Frederick the Great reportedly felt compassion for her mother, and entrusted Frederica Charlotte to the care of his own wife, Elisabeth Christine of Brunswick-Wolfenbüttel-Bevern, with the words: "There is only this poor child remaining to her, and she can find no asylum save with you; let the little one have the apartments lately occupied by my niece of Holland." Frederica Charlotte reportedly had a happy childhood with Queen Elisabeth Christine, who had no children of her own. The Queen doted upon her grandniece and foster daughter, who kept in correspondence with her foster mother her entire life.

== Marriage ==
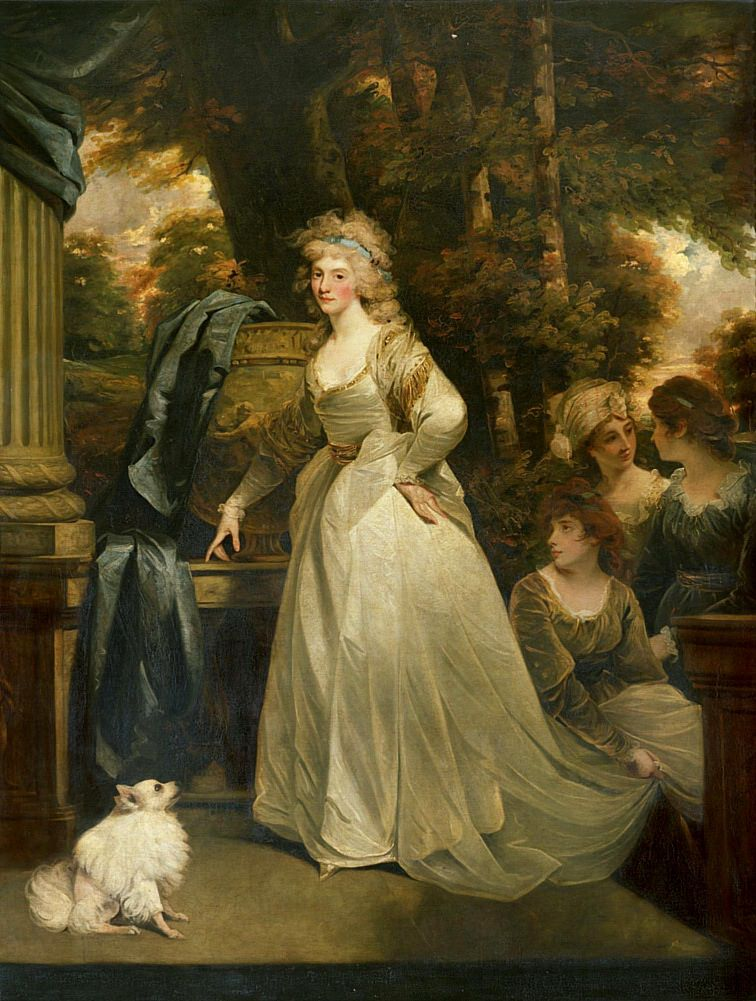
Portrait of Princess Frederica, Duchess of York, by John Hoppner

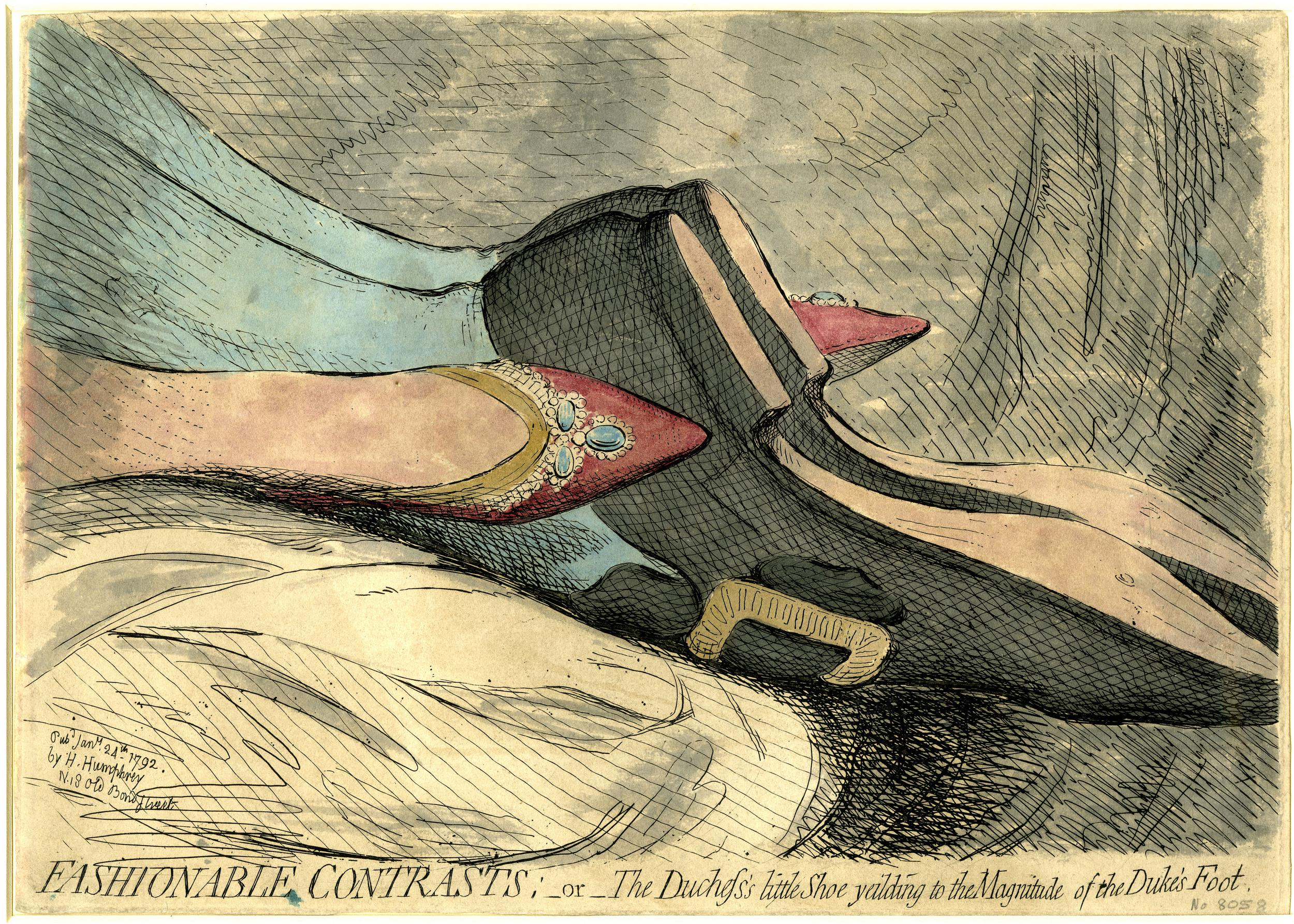
James Gillray: Fashionable Contrasts; – or – the Duchess's little shoe yielding to the magnitude of the Duke's foot, originally published by Hannah Humphrey on 24 January 1792. The print shows the feet and ankles of the Duke and Duchess of York in an obviously copulatory position.

On 29 September 1791 at Charlottenburg Palace, she married Prince Frederick, Duke of York and Albany, the second son of the British King George III and Queen Charlotte. There was a second marriage ceremony at Buckingham House on 23 November. The new Duchess of York received an enthusiastic welcome in London.

The marriage between Frederica Charlotte and the Duke of York was arranged in order to provide the British throne with heirs, as the Prince of Wales was childless. Reportedly, the Prince of Wales, who was at the time, albeit not legally, married to Maria Fitzherbert, regarded it unnecessary for him to enter a dynastic marriage, because the eldest of his brothers had married a princess and could provide an heir to the throne in his stead. Frederica Charlotte had been chosen upon the wish of Frederick the Great, who allowed George III to read a letter from Frederica Charlotte displaying her gentle and affectionate nature, successfully anticipating that this would touch George III and make him inquire for her to marry his son.

Upon Frederica's marriage, her mother-in-law Queen Charlotte wrote to Queen Elisabeth Christine, Frederica's foster mother: "If anything could add to my satisfaction at the choice of my son, it would be the lively interest which your Majesty takes in the fate of this Princess, your pupil, and I assure you that a Princess brought up under your eye, and to whom you render so high a testimony, shall find in me not only a mother but a friend; and I hope that in gaining the Princess's friendship, I shall also gain a part in yours, which would be of great value to me." The Queen kept her word, as Frederica Charlotte wrote home to her foster mother how well treated she was by her mother-in-law, and how welcome she felt in England, where she once stayed for hours in the House of Commons, so interested in the political speeches that the hours felt like minutes.

The marriage was, however, not a happy one, and after three years, it had become apparent that the Duke and Duchess of York would have no issue. The parliament made it possible for the Duke to pay his debts when he married officially, in the hope that the marriage would produce an heir, but the Duchess of York was by 1794 no longer expected to have children which prompted the Prince of Wales to agree to issue marriage negotiations of his own. Frederica Charlotte and Frederick separated and the Duchess retired to Oatlands Park, Weybridge, where she lived eccentrically until her death. Their relationship after separation appears to have been amicable, but there was never any question of reconciliation.

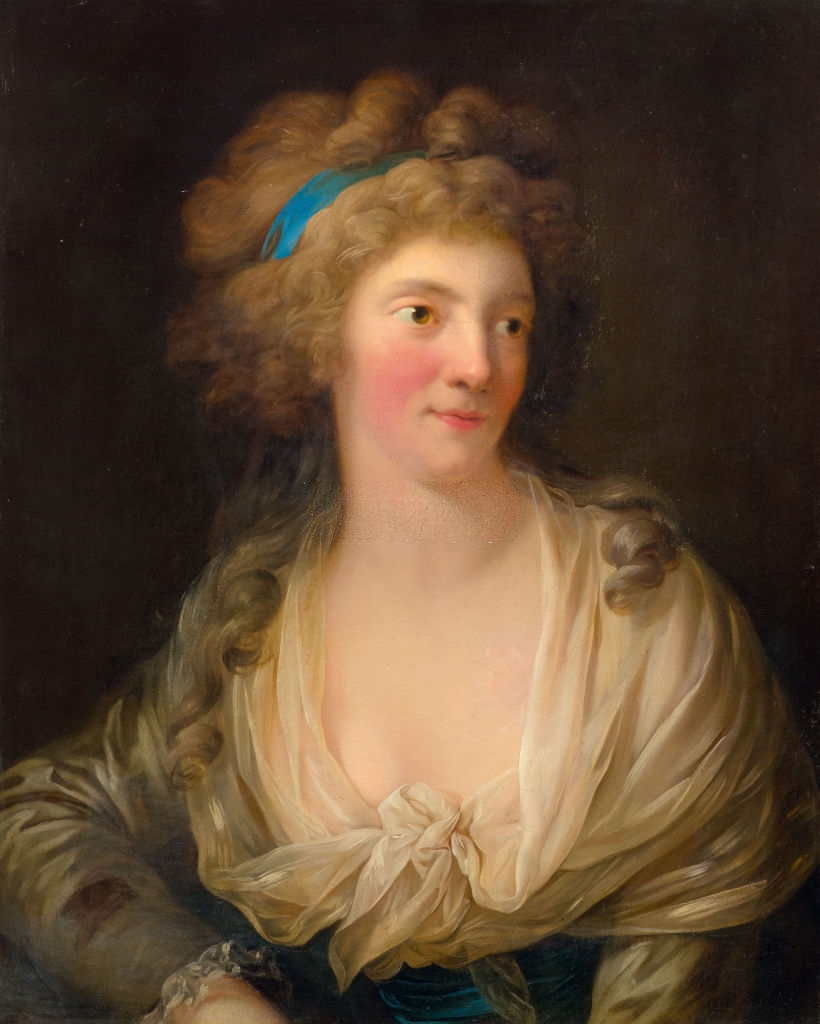
Princess Frederica, Duchess of York, by Anton Graff

She is described as: "clever and well-informed; she likes society and dislikes all form and ceremony, but in the midst of the most familiar intercourse she always preserves a certain dignity of manner", and :"probably no person in such a situation was ever more really liked." In 1827 (after her death), she was called: "a harmless but an eccentric little woman, with an extraordinary fondness for cats and dogs, some indications of the German severity of family etiquette, which gave her household the air of Potsdam, and but a slight share of those attractions which might retain the regards of a husband—young, a soldier, and a prince." High-stakes gambling is reported to have taken place at Oatlands. Frederica kept many dogs and was apparently very devoted to monkeys Her father-in-law once remarked : "Affection must rest on something, and where there are no children, animals are the object." At her death, her spouse is described as sincerely grieved and very anxious that the wishes expressed in her will should be carried out.

== Death ==
Princess Frederica Charlotte died on 6 August 1820 in Oatlands Park in Weybridge, England, and is buried at the churchyard of St James' Church. She is commemorated by the York Column erected by the people of Weybridge on Monument Green.

== Ancestry ==
Ancestors of Princess Frederica Charlotte of Prussia

8. Frederick William I of Prussia
4. Prince Augustus William of Prussia
9. Princess Sophia Dorothea of Hanover
2. Frederick William II of Prussia
10. Ferdinand Albert II, Duke of Brunswick-Wolfenbüttel
5. Duchess Louise Amalie of Brunswick-Wolfenbüttel
11. Duchess Antoinette of Brunswick-Wolfenbüttel
Princess Frederica Charlotte of Prussia
12. Ferdinand Albert II, Duke of Brunswick-Wolfenbüttel (= 10)
6. Charles I, Duke of Brunswick-Wolfenbüttel
13. Duchess Antoinette of Brunswick-Wolfenbüttel (= 11)
3. Duchess Elisabeth Christine of Brunswick-Wolfenbüttel
14. Frederick William I of Prussia (= 8)
7. Princess Philippine Charlotte of Prussia
15. Princess Sophia Dorothea of Hanover (= 9)
