= Augusta Dorothea, Abbess of Gandersheim =

Princess-Abbess of Gandersheim (1749–1810)

Princess Augusta Dorothea of Brunswick-Wolfenbüttel
- Princess-Abbess of Gandersheim
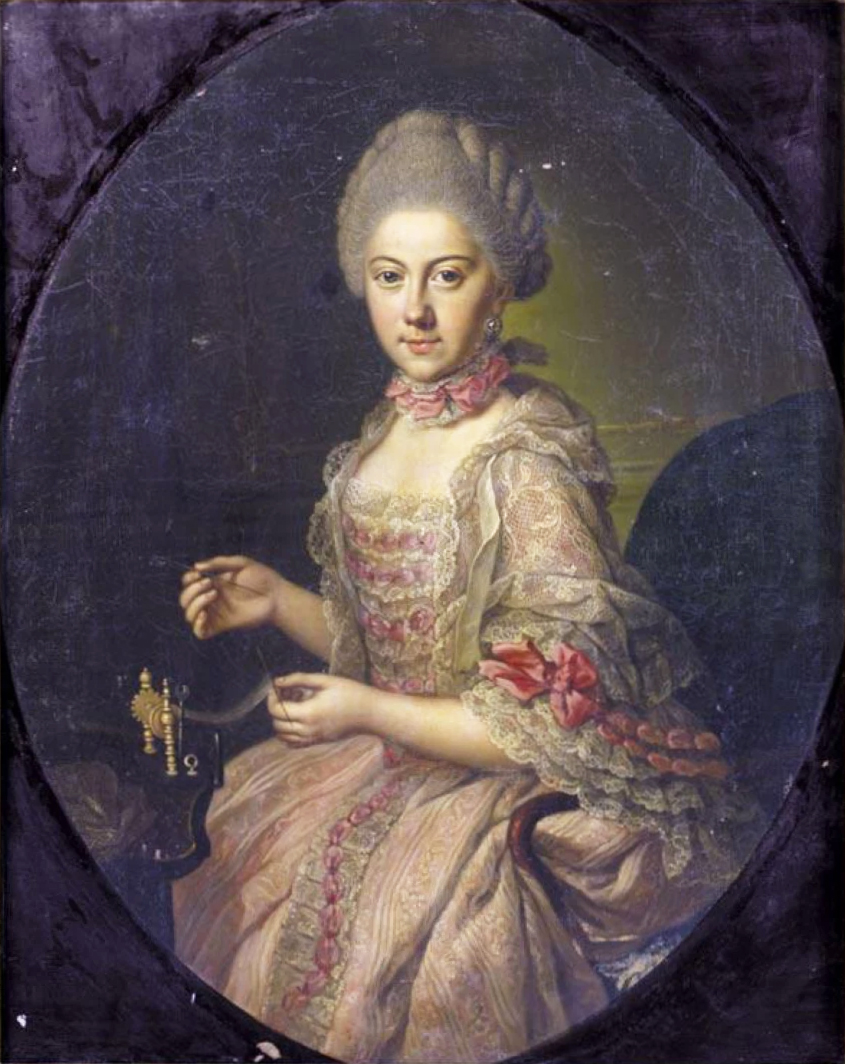
- Portrait by Anna Rosina de Gasc, 1780
- Born: 2 October 1749; Wolfenbüttel
- Died: 10 March 1810 (aged 60); Gandersheim Abbey
- House: Brunswick-Bevern
- Father: Charles I, Duke of Brunswick-Wolfenbüttel
- Mother: Princess Philippine Charlotte of Prussia

Augusta Dorothea of Brunswick-Wolfenbüttel (2 October 1749 – 10 March 1810), was Princess Abbess of Gandersheim Abbey from 1778 until 1810. She was the last sovereign Princess-Abbess of Gandersheim.

== Life ==
Augusta Dorothea was the daughter of Charles I, Duke of Brunswick-Wolfenbüttel, and Princess Philippine Charlotte of Prussia. She became deaconess in Quedlinburg Abbey in 1776. Two years later, she succeeded her aunt Therese of Brunswick-Wolfenbüttel as Princess Abbess of Gandersheim. However, she continued to spend her life at the Brunswick court.

In the 1770s, her sister in law, Princess Augusta of Great Britain, condemned Augusta as well as her sister Elisabeth Christine of Brunswick-Wolfenbüttel, Crown Princess of Prussia, who had been imprisoned for adultery, for their love life. Hedwig Elisabeth Charlotte of Holstein-Gottorp described her at the time of her visit to Brunswick in 1799 as "full of wit and energy and very amusing."

In 1802, Gandersheim became annexed by Brunswick during the secularization of the clerical states in Germany, but she kept her title. When Brunswick was captured by France in 1806, Augusta fled. Napoleon I, however, allowed her to keep the title and the right to reside in Gandersheim. When she died, the post was never filled again, and Gandersheim became a part of the Kingdom of Westphalia.
