= York Column =

Monument in Weybridge, England

Coordinates: 51.3738°N 0.4554°W

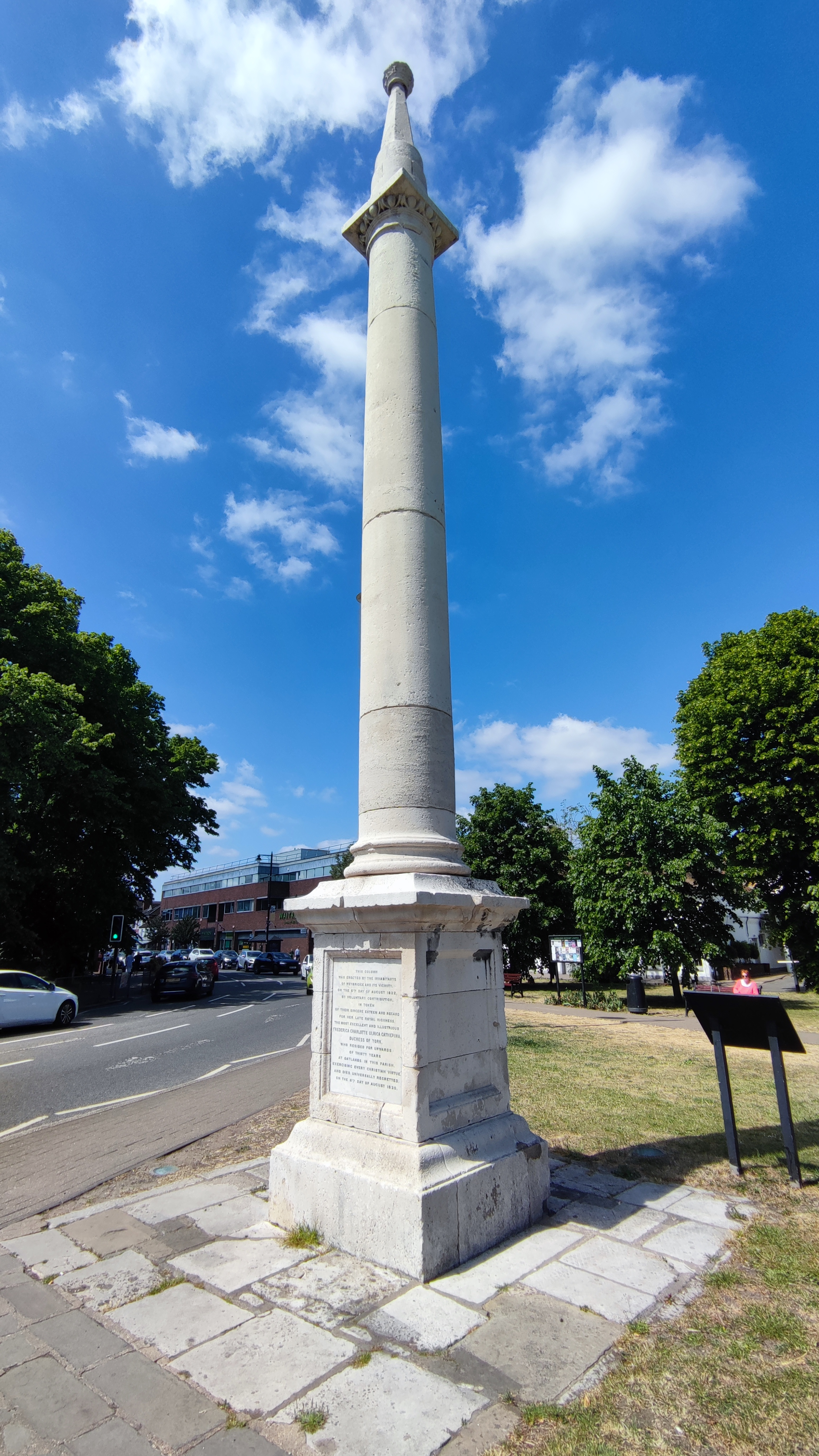
- The York Column in 2025
- Interactive map of the York Column area

General information
- Type: Monument
- Location: Monument Green, Weybridge, England
- Completed: 6 August 1822

Design and construction
- Architects: Edward Pierce; James Paine

Listed Building – Grade II
- Official name: York Column
- Designated: 19 October 1951
- Reference no.: 1030168

The York Column is a monument erected in 1822 in the town of Weybridge, Surrey, England. It commemorates Princess Frederica Charlotte of Prussia, Duchess of York, who had lived locally for 30 years. The column, located in Monument Green, is a Grade II listed building and had previously stood in the St Giles area of London, from where it was removed in 1773.

== History ==
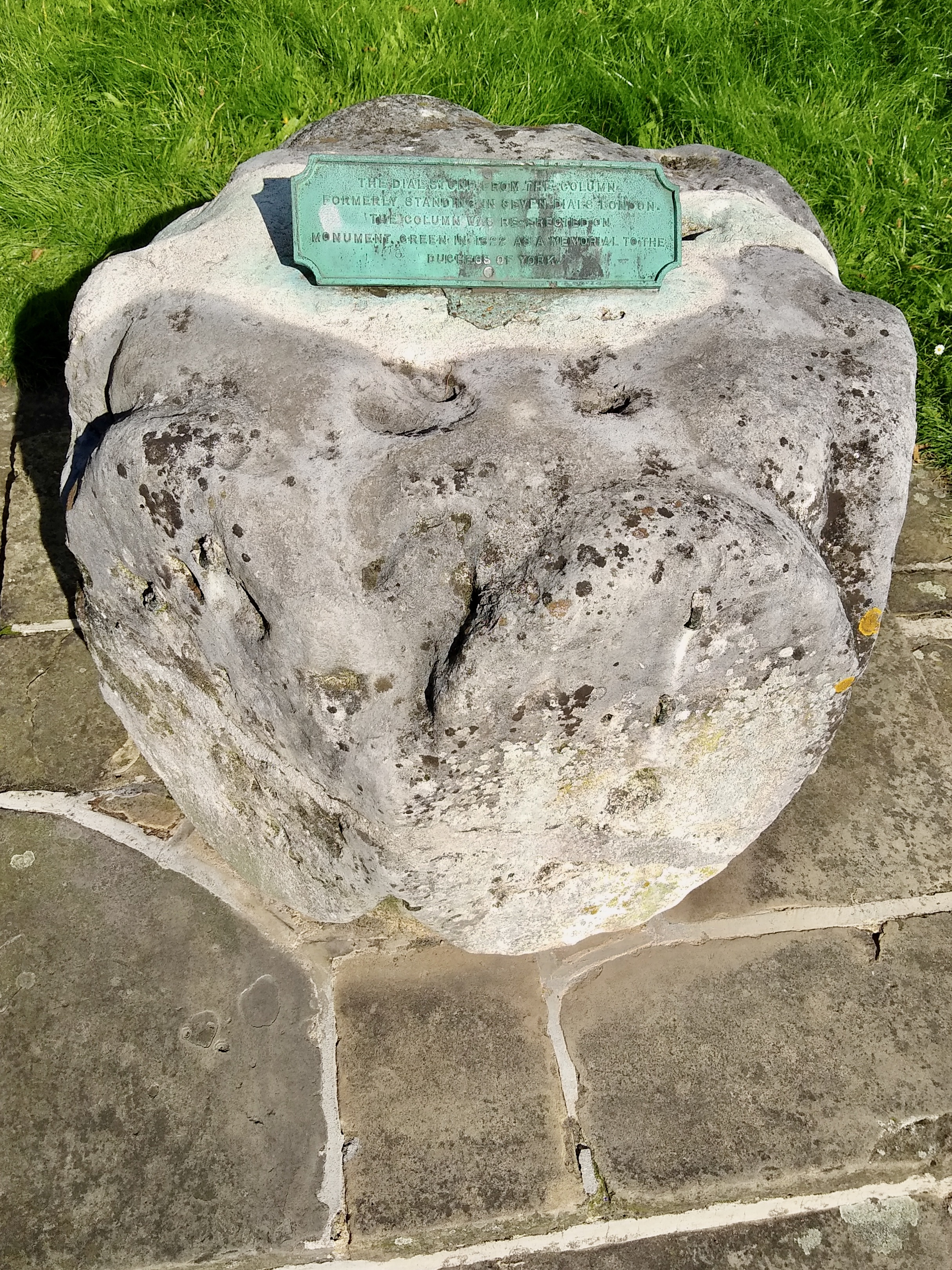
York Column dialstone located next to the public library, Weybridge, Surrey

=== Construction ===
The monument was initially located at the centre of the Seven Dials junction in St Giles, London, and was erected in honour of the Duke of York. In 1694, Member of Parliament and entrepreneur Thomas Neale commissioned sculptor Edward Pierce to erect the column as part of a property development scheme at Seven Dials – part of a major rebuilding programme brought forth in London following the devastation of the Great Fire. The column was crowned with a dial stone with six facets, each with sundials which at the time served as public clocks. The naming of the "Seven Dials" is subject to conjecture; it has been suggested that the column itself serves as the gnomon of the seventh dial.

=== Removal ===
In the 18th century, the Seven Dials area "became the haunt of cut-throats, thieves and prostitutes". Hence, in 1773 the London commissioners removed the column to discourage "undesirables". Multiple sources, including the official Survey of London, allege that the pillar had been torn down by a mob to find buried gold or money. The remains of the monument were acquired by architect James Paine who kept them in his house on Sayes Court, Addlestone, initially with the intention of rebuilding it in the park.

=== Reconstruction ===
On 6 August 1820, Princess Frederica Charlotte of Prussia, widow of the Duke of York, died at Oatlands in Weybridge after living there thirty years. She was popular in the area, having been a generous benefactor to local causes; and the inhabitants of Weybridge, desirous to honour her memory, purchased the discarded remains of the pillar through a public subscription organised by Mr Joseph Todd, landlord of the nearby Ship Hotel. The column was hence re-erected on Monument Green on 6 August 1822, the second anniversary of the duchess' death. The dial stone, deemed too heavy, was replaced with a ducal coronet, and the base was inscribed in memory of the duchess:

“This column was erected by the inhabitants of Weybridge and its vicinity on the 6th day of August 1822 by voluntary contribution. In token of their sincere esteem and regard for her late Royal Highness the most excellent and illustrious Frederica Charlotte Ulrica Catherina, Duchess of York. Who resided for upwards of thirty years at Oatlands in this parish, exercising every Christian virtue and died, universally regretted, on the 6th day of August 1820.”

A poem inscribed on the north-west side reads:

"Ye poor, suppress the mournful sigh,
Her spirit is with Christ on High,
In those bright realms of heavenly peace,
Where charity shall never cease,
Her deeds of mercy and of love,
Are registered in courts above."

The dial stone was moved to the west side of Weybridge Library. The plaque on the top reads:

"The dial stone from the column formerly standing in Seven Dials London. The column was re-erected on Monument Green in 1822 as a memorial to the duchess of York."

=== Seven Dials column replica ===
The Seven Dials Monument Committee (today known as the Seven Dials Trust) was established in 1984 in an bid to erect a replica of the original monument at the Seven Dials. Following a successful fundraising campaign, the new column, a work by A.D. Mason of Whitfield Partners Architects, was unveiled on 29 June 1989. It is the first monumental column to be erected in London since Nelson’s Column in the late 19th century.

=== Renovation ===
The column was cleaned at some point in the second half of 2024.

== Architecture ==
The Tuscan column stands on a pedestal with an engraved poem and eulogy to the duchess of York on the north-west and south-east sides respectively. The shaft is made up of five drums and forms a slight entasis. The capital features an egg-and-tongue echinus beneath the abacus and is crowned by a ducal coronet. The Pevsner Architectural Guides (Buildings of England) series describes it as "oddly thin and skimped ... better seen simply as a townscape inflection".

== Gallery ==
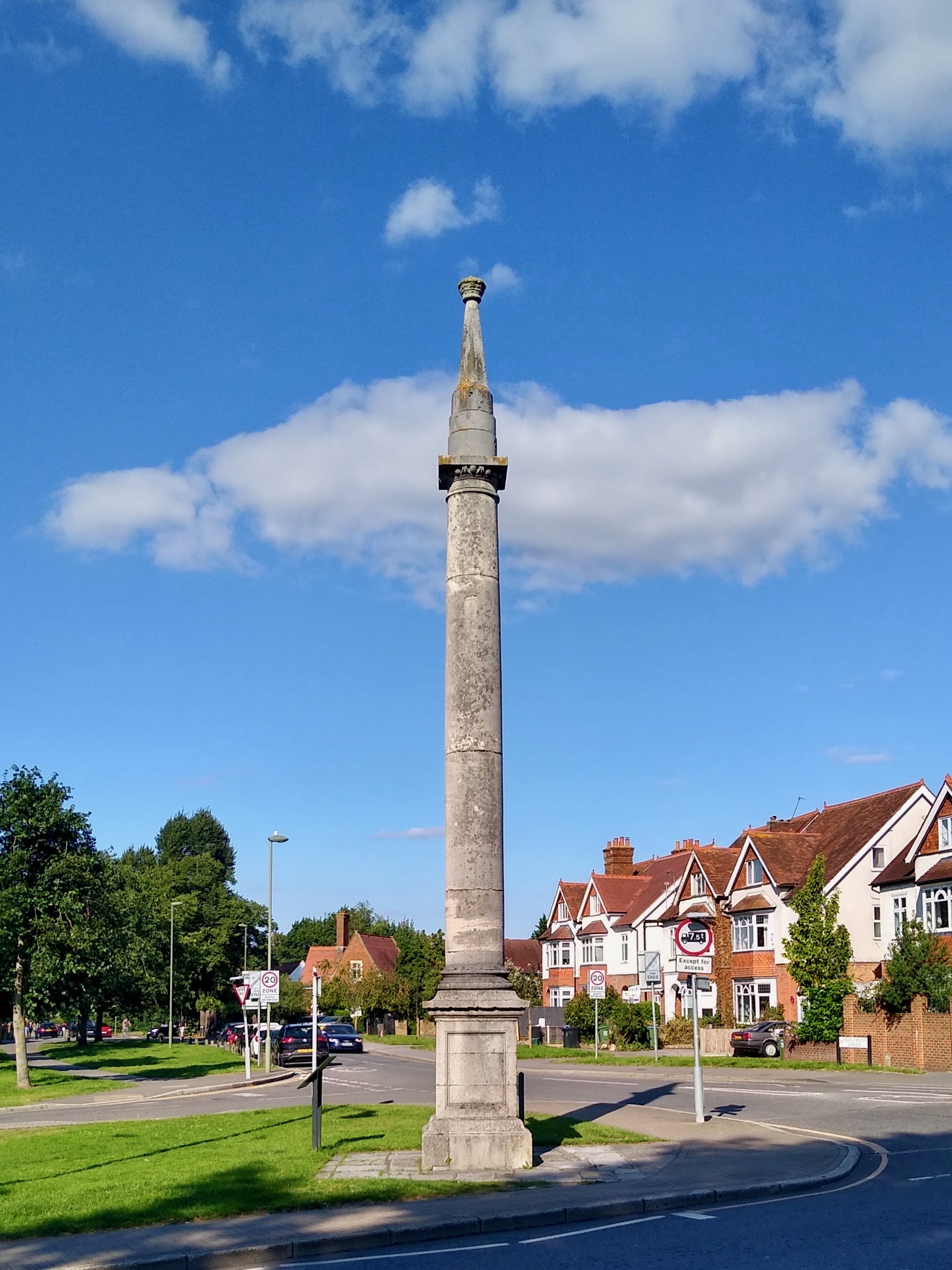
The column in 2021 before the renovation.

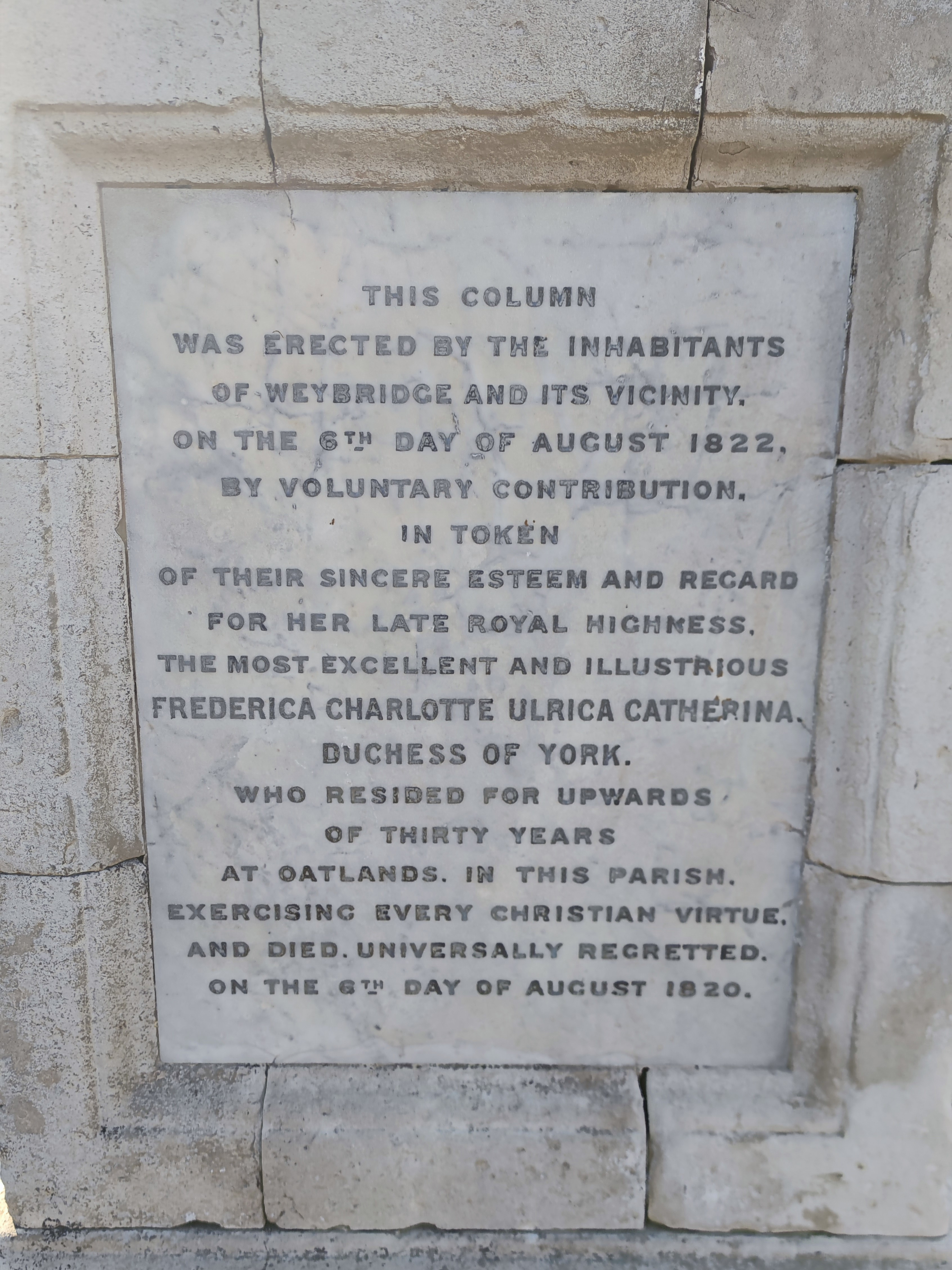
The homage to Princess Frederica Charlotte of Prussia on the south-east side.

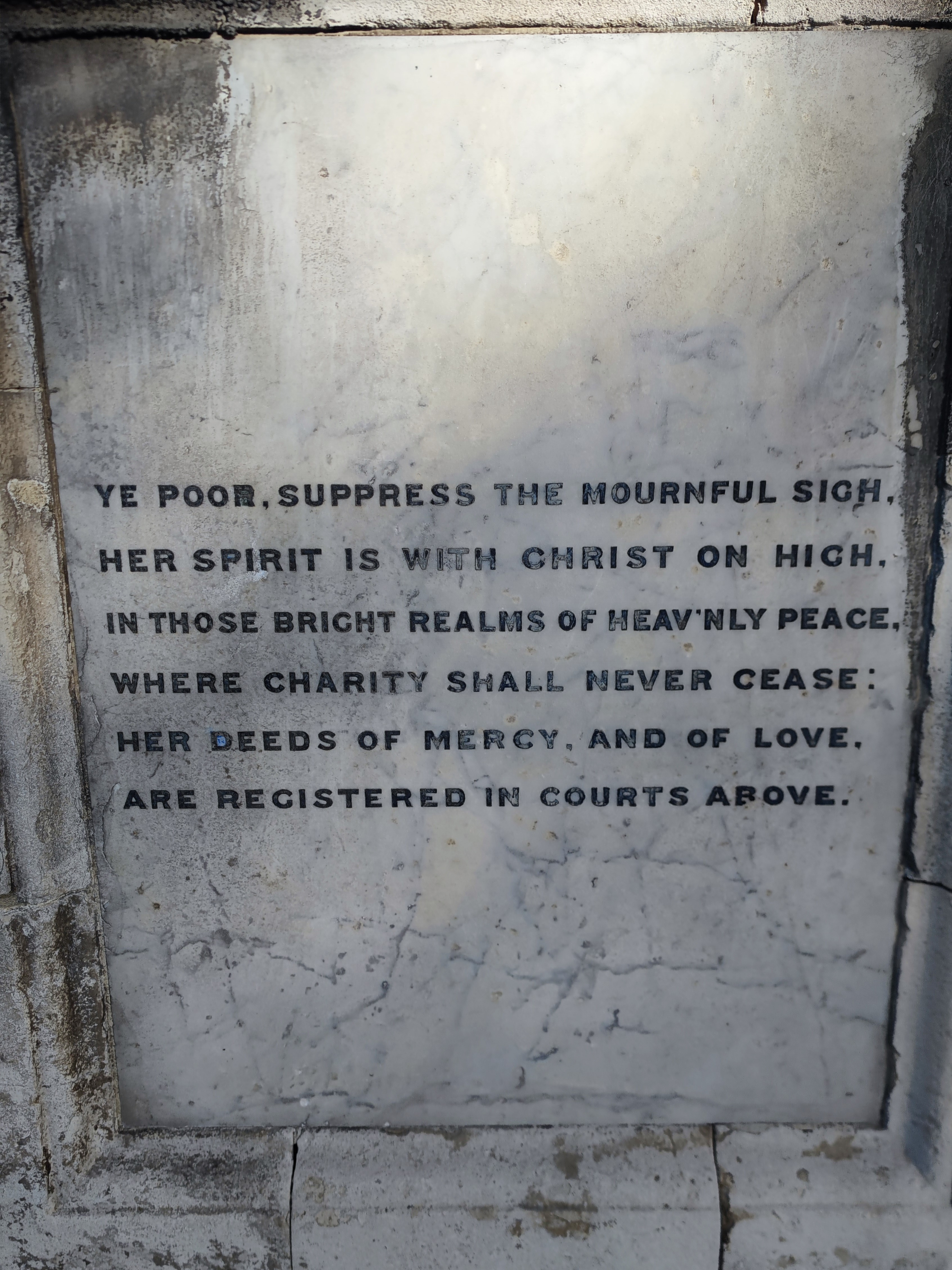
The poem on the north-west side.

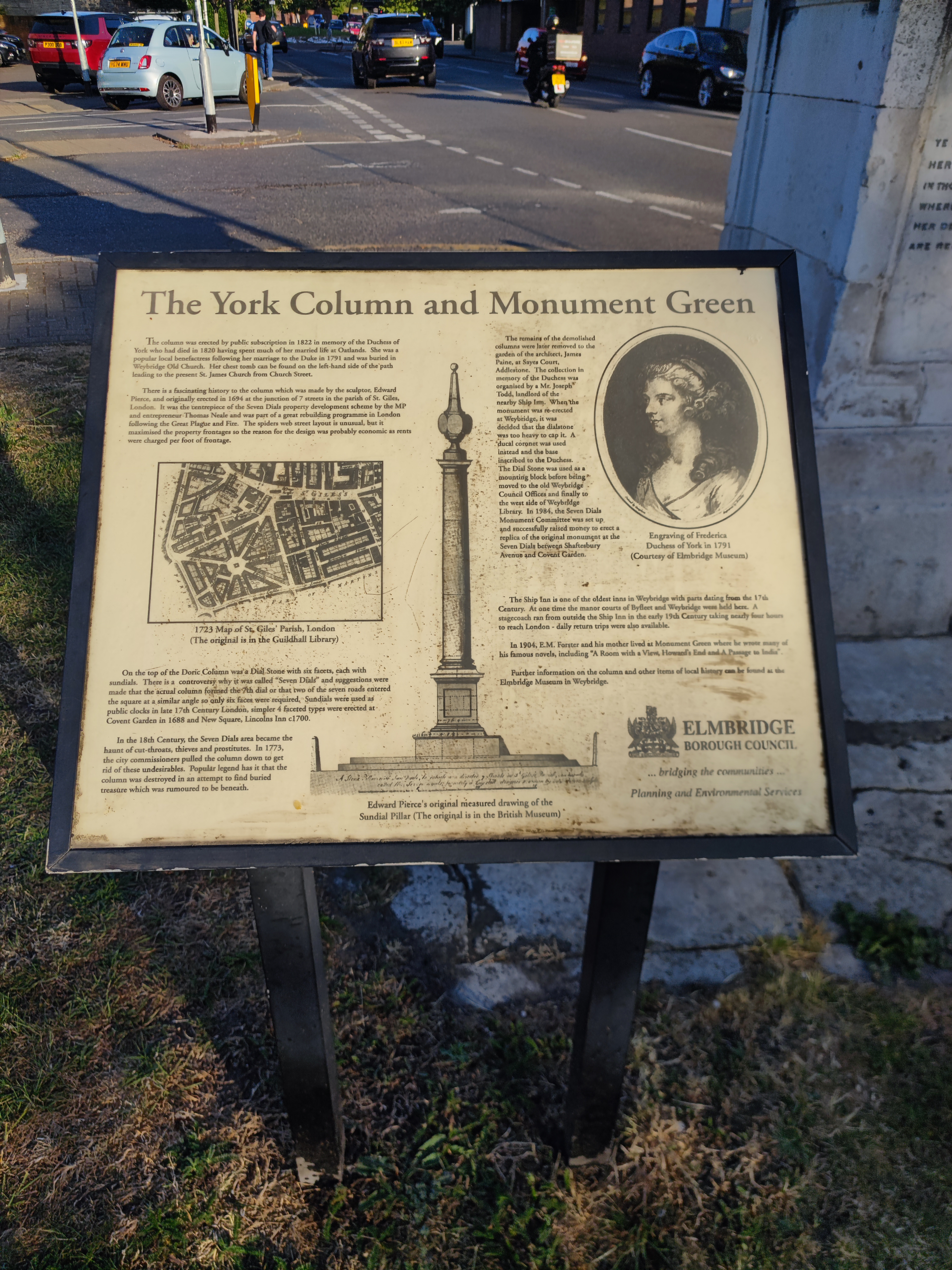
The sign explaining the history of the column.
