= Christian Theodor von Pincier =

- Born: July 8th 1750; Brunswick
- Died: April 18th 1824; Sorel, Quebec, Canada
- Noble family: House of Guelph
- Spouse: Charlotte Bellefeuille Rivard
- Father: Charles I, Duke of Brunswick-Lüneburg
- Mother: Claire Desmarets

Captain Christian Theodor von Pincier, later known as Theodore Pincier, Esquire, or as Theodore de Pencier (1750 – 1824), was a Brunswick Army Officer who served on the British side during the American Revolution. Following the peace treaty, he became a settler and well-known surveyor in colonial British Quebec. He was the illegitimate son of Charles I, Duke of Brunswick-Wolfenbüttel, who was adopted into the Pincier von Königstein family, known as von Pincier in German and Swedish, then to dePencier & Depencier. Theodor was the adopted child of Braunschweig Army General von Pincier.

Throughout his military career in German-speaking regiments, he used the surname von Pincier, but, later, in Canada, he adopted a French version of his surname, altering the spelling to de Pencier.

He left many descendants in Canada. Some became prominent: and include an Anglican archbishop, The Most Rev. Dr Adam de Pencier, and that prelate's grandson, Michael de Pencier, a decorated Canadian publisher, entrepreneur, and environmental conservationist. Family members continue to spell the surname, de Pencier or dePencier.

== Birth ==
Christian Theodor was born out of wedlock in Braunschweig in 1750. He was the illegitimate child of Charles I, Duke of Brunswick-Wolfenbüttel and a married Frenchwoman. His mother's husband, a French grenadier captain named de Martigny, later killed himself, perhaps out of jealousy. Widowed, she remarried to a Franco-Swedish nobleman belonging to the family of Pincier von Königstein. Christian Theodor was never recognized by his father, and, instead, was adopted by his mother's husband, Georges-Henri de Pincier, a descendant of Baron Pincier (#109), whose family had received their patent of nobility in Stockholm from Charles XII of Sweden in 1698. From this step-father, young Christian Theodor gained the surname which he bore. He was to use it for the rest of his life prefixed by one or other of the German or French noble particles von or de as the situation warranted. This was a common practice of the time among the nobility, who alternated between German and French custom, as they moved about Western Europe during their careers and travels.

== Early life ==
At age 14, de Pencier volunteered as a cadet and learned to ride in his father's ducal stables. His extraordinary horsemanship by age 16 enabled him to become standard bearer for his military unit. He received his first commission the next year, and, in 1771, at age 21, was promoted to lieutenant.

Between 1773 and 1774 he travelled in France and Italy, visiting Florence, Rome and Naples. During the period of his early life, he was celebrated for his numerous love affairs and rumours of liaisons with many noblewomen. In 1775, he wrote a poem dedicated to donna Elisabeth de Baffa Trasci (1750–1795) an Albanian aristocrat whom he met in Naples. She refused his marriage proposals, but gave him an illegitimate daughter, Carlotta Maria Amalia. The poem was published in 1782 under a pseudonym.

Theodore became a superb horseman and studied literature, poetry, astronomy, engineering, and also military artillery strategy and tactics while mastering French, German, Italian, Latin and English.

== Army career ==
As Theodore de Pencier was assigned to Prince Frederick's regiment as part the Hessian cavalry of General Baron Friedrich Adolf Riedesel, the young officer was destined to see action in North America during the American Revolution.

In June 1776, he and 4,000 Hessian 'mercenaries,' many of whom had not left Hesse-Cassel willingly, arrived in Quebec. In the early summer of 1776, Sir Guy Carleton, the British governor and commander-in-chief in Quebec, tasked General John Burgoyne with driving the invading Americans out of the province and south into New York. Faced with Burgoyne's 6,000 British troops and Riedesel's 4,000 German mercenaries, the weakened Americans retreated to Sorel at the confluence of the St. Lawrence and Richelieu rivers.

The Americans under General Horatio Gates retreated, this time to the safety of formidable Fort Ticonderoga. The Hessians, much to the frustration of Baron Riedesel, were largely unprepared for pursuit. Historian Thomas Randall compared "the south-moving procession of British infantry and German infantry and cavalry, batteries of artillery, ammunition wagons, supply wagons" to a travelling circus.

The Hessians seemed alien to their British counterparts. They often sang psalms on the march and caught and tamed wild animals. Baroness Riedesel and her entourage travelled by elegant caleche, while the Brunswick Dragoons, short on horses, had to march with their enormous cocked hats, thick coats, leather breeches, and jack boots rising above their knees. Captain de Pencier, as an officer, was fortunate to retain his mount. He also avoided the fate of many Hessians: death under American fire by sharpshooters using the deadly accurate Pennsylvania flintlock.

With significant losses and failed manoeuvres on both ends of the Mohawk Valley, Lake Ontario, and the Hudson, Burgoyne surrendered after the Battle of Saratoga in the face of heavy Yankee artillery and more than 14,000 men mustered by Gates. The Hessians had recently suffered a major defeat at Bennington with 200 dead and many more imprisoned. De Pencier likely encountered frontier spies Roger Stevens and Stephen Burritt for the first time here at Bennington. Stevens, imprisoned with Burritt after the battle, became the first to settle the Rideau 15 years later, providing his homestead as a meeting place for de Pencier and his Rideau survey teams.

The Americans reneged on the terms of surrender; rather than sending the captive Europeans home, they sent the British troops to prison camps surrounding Boston, while the other Hessian captives were sent to camps in Pennsylvania and Virginia. Officers were put in cramped quarters, with as many as six to a room; Baron Riedesel, his wife and children, initially suffered too, living in small, cold surroundings. All found their conditions improve as the British began paying outrageous American fees for the food and lodging of prisoners. Theodor did not participate in the Battle of Saratoga and remained stationed at the fort in Sorel Quebec for the remainder of the Revolutionary War (1776-1783).

De Pencier, by then a widower, returned to Europe in 1783 with most of the Hessian prisoners. He stayed only long enough to receive his honourable discharge from Prince Frederick's regiment and obtain British naturalisation. He returned to Canada the next year, but could not find employment despite letters of recommendation from Baron Riedesel. Signs of his stress began to emerge at this time. He was described as 'haunting' government offices with a 'drooping spirit,' though he was buoyed temporarily by a grant of 20 pounds. He remarried and his second wife gave birth to a second son, Luke.

A Loyalist grant of 300 acres from General Haldimand proved to be unmanageable. De Pencier was neither a lumberman nor a farmer and lacked the necessary financial and physical resources to clear the land. He wrote that his hands were "accustomed only to the use of the sword and the training of horses, too weak to cut down trees and to sell them at a profit quickly and advantageously." Finally, tired of feeding his family on meager rations, he took up land surveying at the age of 35. His sound education in mathematics enabled him to apprentice using a borrowed theodolite, a calibrated optical instrument used to determine relative position in surveying, navigation, and meteorology. In 1789, he received his full commission as a surveyor.

His quarrels with the British authorities continued to consume him. He later complained to Governor General Sherbrooke that he had become a surveyor because he had very little money, despite the sacrifices he and his father had made in battle on behalf of the British.

De Pencier received instructions in 1791 to survey the first townships on the Rideau River in what was to become modern-day Ottawa.

In Canada, after his first marriage with Marie Demerais, he remarried Charlotte Rivard Bellefeuille on November 4, 1785, at the Protestant Church in Trois-Rivières. She was born in Sorel, May 7, 1766, the daughter of Jean-Baptiste Rivard and Marie-Josephe Lesieur.

== Descendants ==
The descendants of Theodore de Pencier are numerous.

By his liaison with Mlle Hélène de Tour, he had an illegitimate daughter, viz.:

- Thérèse de Pincier, who died in infancy.

By his liaison with donna Elizabeth de Baffa Trasci, he had an illegitimate daughter, viz.:

- Carlotta Maria Amalia, known as Charlotte de Pincier. No known issue.

By his first wife, Marie Demerais, he had issue, one daughter and one son, viz.:

- Charles de Pencier, who died in infancy.
- Theodorigne Duperron, b. 1778 Sorel. Died ~1830. No issue

By his second wife, Charlotte de Bellefeuille, he had numerous issue, viz.:

- Hortense de Pencier born in 1787, who married February 18, 1822 in Sorel, Luis Guyan Dragon. She married secondly, James Sheppard, or Shepherd, of Sorel (and had issue).
- Marie Jacqueline de Pencier married Andree Lavalle, April 18, 1823
- Sophie (Sophia) de Pencier, born August 27, 1793, married John Haines.
- Marie Josephine de Pencier married Pierre Bellefeuille, of Montreal.
- A youngest daughter married M. La Fontaine
- Luke de Pencier (1785–1877), of Marlborough, Carleton county, Ontario married Gertrude Onderkirk (Williamstown 1794- Burritts Rapids, Ontario 1873) and, by her, he had issue:
  - William de Pencier (1811-1873) married Amarilla Lane.
  - Diana de Pencier (1815-1877) married Elihu Adams.
  - Urias de Pencier (1817-1866) married Hanna Eastman.
  - Caroline de Pencier (1820-1890) married Jeremiah Mercel or Marcellus.
  - Louis de Pencier (1823-1893) married Sarah McFadden.
  - Isaac Walter de Pencier (1825-1912) married Ann Carroll.
  - Maria Sophia de Pencier (1829-) married George L. Burritt, of Goderich, Huron county, Ontario.
  - Eliza Ann de Pencier (1831-1912) married Henry Moore.
  - Julia de Pencier (1833-1912) married Edward Burritt.
  - Peter Theodore de Pencier (Williamsburg, Ontario February 4, 1812 - Burritts Rapids, Ontario June 20, 1900), married Sarah Eastman (1822–1909), granddaughter of Benjamin Eastman, U.E., and, by her, he had issue:
    - Sarah de Pencier, died in infancy.
    - Lilian or Lillian de Pencier, died in infancy or young.
    - John Luke de Pencier (1844/5-1872), who died without issue.
    - Silas Theodore de Pencier (1846-1934), married (1) Marion Merritt, and (2) 1893, Julia A. Murray, and, by one or other, had issue:
      - John Arthur de Pencier
      - Frederic Garfield de Pencier
      - Mabel de Pencier.
    - Sarah Josephine de Pencier (1848-19?) married The Rev. William Wright, Anglican rector of Athens, Leeds county, Ontario (-1904), and had issue.
    - Daniel de Pencier, settled in California, U.S.A. (1850-) and married 1878, Jessie Ketchen or Jenny Kitchen, and had issue, one daughter, and a son, viz.:
      - Theodore de Pencier.
    - Edwin de Pencier, settled in Manitoba, Canada (1853-1950) married 1876, Alice Jane Beamish (ca 1857–1925), and, by her had issue:
      - Guy de Pencier.
      - Frederic Theodore de Pencier.
      - Edith de Pencier.
      - Elizabeth de Pencier.
    - Rebecca Ann de Pencier (1857– Feb. 9, 1943) married Frank Kitson Ebbitt (d. Jan. 26, 1945).
      - Frances de Pencier Ebbitt (1900-May 27, 1960) married Charles Wilfred Richard Day (1904-1984)
        - Ann Frances Patricia Day (b. Mar 17, 1938) married Geoffrey Robert William Kinney (b. Dec 4, 1930- Sept. 1985), and, by him, had issue.
          - Geoffrey Richard John Kinney (b. June 30, 1961) m. Louise Pierrette Kermath (b. Oct 3, 1964), and, by her, had issue.
            - Geoffrey Kenneth Matthew Kinney (b. Jun 24, 1992).
            - Andrew Thomas Kinney (b. Jul 14, 1994).
          - Mark Andrew Kinney (b. Feb 5 1963) m. Jill Armstrong, and, by her, had issue.
            - Trevor Mitchell Kinney (b. Jun 25 1990).
            - Emily Jane Kinney (b. May 13, 1993).
            - Hanna Elizabeth Kinney (b. Jan 28 1999).
          - Peter James Kinney (b. Sept 5 1966 d. Dec 1985).
          - Sarah Frances Kinney (b. July 27, 1973) m. Morgan Paul Goddard (b. Sep 20, 1973), and, by him, had issue.
            - Evelyn Pixie Frances Goddard (b. Aug 2, 2005)
            - Rowan Basil Peter (b. Aug 17, 2008)
        - John Richard Day (b. July 6, 1939) married Mary MacDonald-Wilson (d. 2011), no issue.
        - David Donald Frank Day (b. March 6, 1941) married (later divorced) Sharon Jessie McLean (b. July 3, 1944), and, by her, had issue.
          - Michael David Day (b. May 22, 1969) m. Fay King April 14, 1970, and, by her, had issue.
            - Emma Kaitlyn Day (b. Dec 5, 1996)
            - Gavin Michael Day (b. Mar 11 1999)
          - Roger Day m. Helene Mitchell, and, by her, had issue.
    - Guy de Pencier (1859-1902) who married and had issue:
      - Guy Newell de Pencier
      - Edwin or Elmer de Pencier.
    - Amelia de Pencier (1861-1949) married The Rev. Charles Burton Clarke, Anglican rector of Metcalfe, Russell county, Ontario (1863-1937), and had issue.
    - Adam Urias de Pencier (1866-1949), O.B.E., D.D., 3rd Bishop of New Westminster (1910-1940), and 5th Archbishop and Metropolitan of the Ecclesiastical Province of British Columbia (1925-1940). He married 29 June 1895, Nina Frederica Wells (1873-1937), and, by her, had issue:
      - The Rev. Canon Theodore Frederick Wells de Pencier, b. 15 Sept. 1896 – 1977, Anglican clergyman.
      - John Dartnell de Pencier, 1898 – 1920.
      - Joseph Christian de Pencier, 1900–1974, m. 7 June 1928, Evelyn Margaret Richardson, and, by her, he had issue:
        - John D. de Pencier (b. 5 May 1930, Toronto, Ontario), LL.D., F.I.I.C., married Marianne Frazer Lithgow, and, by her, has had issue, four children.
        - Michael Christian de Pencier, C.M., O.Ont., M.A. (b. 19 Jan. 1935, Toronto, Ontario) married Honor Bonnycastle, and, by her, has had issue, three children
      - George Russell de Pencier, 1903 – 1903.
      - Nina Hortense de Pencier, 1905 – 1977. m. Kenneth Simon Vaughan, and had issue.
      - Sarah Elizabeth (Betty) de Pencier, 1907–.
      - Eric Andrew Edwin de Pencier, 1910–.
      - Adam Eastman de Pencier, 1912–1939.
      - Mary Gertrude de Pencier, 1915–1916.

== Death ==
Impoverished, hopeless, and indigent, de Pencier committed suicide in a Canadian military asylum on April 18, 1824. On April 19, shortly after Easter 1824, the remains of de Pencier were placed in a modest grave at Fort William Henry by the Richelieu River in Quebec. Moments earlier, a British subaltern reached into de Pencier's coffin and removed his sword, a final act of discourtesy to the dead Hessian officer, and probably a reflection of the fact that suicide was then a crime. From the register of the Anglican parish of Christ Church, William Henry (now Sorel, Quebec) comes Capt. de Pencier's burial entry, viz.:

"Buried on this nineteenth day of April one thousand eight hundred twenty four Theodore Pincier Esquire formerly of the German troops in the British Service and late a sworn surveyor of this province."
