= Princess Philippine Charlotte of Prussia =

Duchess of Brunswick-Wolfenbüttel from 1735 to 1780

Philippine Charlotte of Prussia
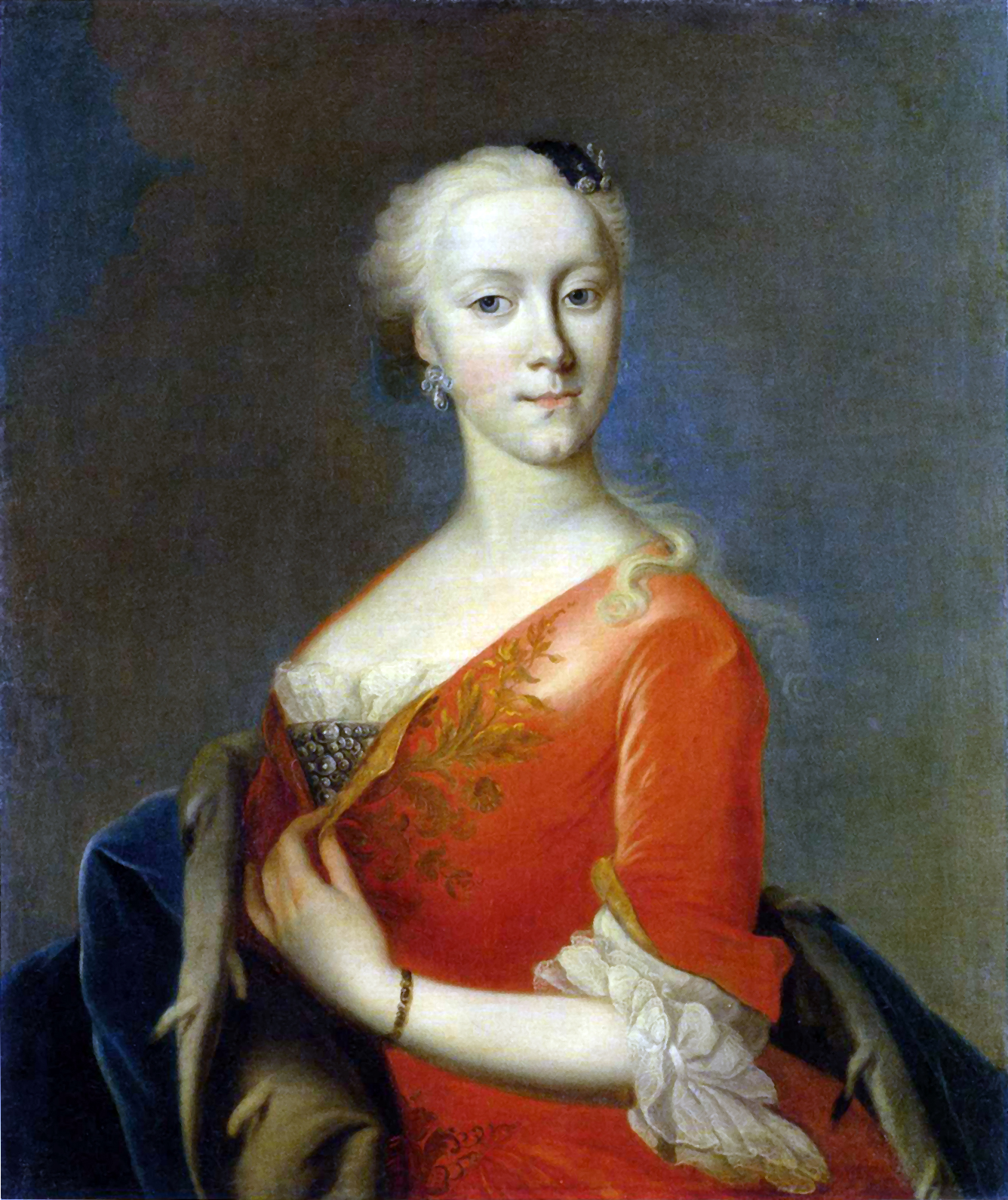
- Portrait by Francesco Carlo Rusca, c. 1735–37

Duchess consort of Brunswick-Wolfenbüttel
- Tenure: 2 September 1735 – 26 March 1780
- Born: 13 March 1716; Stadtschloss, Berlin
- Died: 17 February 1801 (aged 84); Brunswick
- Burial: Braunschweig Cathedral
- Spouse: Charles I, Duke of Brunswick-Wolfenbüttel (m. 1733; died 1780)
- Issue Detail: Charles II, Duke of Brunswick-Wolfenbüttel; Sophie, Margravine of Brandenburg-Bayreuth; Anna, Duchess of Saxe-Weimar-Eisenach; Prince Frederick Augustus; Elisabeth Christine, Crown Princess of Prussia; Augusta Dorothea, Abbess of Gandersheim; Prince Leopold
- House: Hohenzollern
- Father: Frederick William I of Prussia
- Mother: Sophia Dorothea of Hanover

Princess Philippine Charlotte of Prussia (13 March 1716 – 17 February 1801) was Duchess of Brunswick-Wolfenbüttel by marriage to Charles I. Philippine Charlotte was a known intellectual in contemporary Germany. She is listed as a female composer as she is thought to have written marches and other music.

== Life ==
Philippine Charlotte was a daughter of Frederick William I of Prussia and his wife Sophia Dorothea of Hanover. On 2 July 1733 in Berlin, Princess Philippine Charlotte married Charles I of Brunswick-Wolfenbüttel, eldest son of Ferdinand Albert II of Brunswick-Wolfenbüttel. Charles inherited the duchy on his father's death in 1735, making her Duchess consort.

The double marriage alliance between Prussia and Brunswick by her marriage to Charles I, and that of her brother Frederick to Charles' sister Elisabeth Christine, led to a permanent alliance of Prussia and Brunswick. These family ties resulted in the alliance of Brunswick and Prussia in the Seven Years' War, and the careers of Philippine's sons in the Prussian military.

Philippine Charlotte was described as subtle, highly educated and a child of the Age of Enlightenment. She worked independently of an extract of the philosophical writings of Christian von Wolff in French.

The duchess pursued, partly due to the influence of the ducal adviser Johann Friedrich Wilhelm Jerusalem, the German intellectual life very closely. She appreciated the poet Salomon Gessner and maintained a personal relationship with Friedrich Gottlieb Klopstock. The dramatist Gotthold Ephraim Lessing was also among her circle.

As duchess, Philippine Charlotte's court life focused on her circle of conversation before and after dinner in her state apartments in the Grauer Hof, which attracted scholars and men of letters with positions at court.

The Brunswick court attended a few opera performances and public balls a year in accordance with court etiquette, but the large expenditure of her spouse soon made it necessary to have a more economic court life.

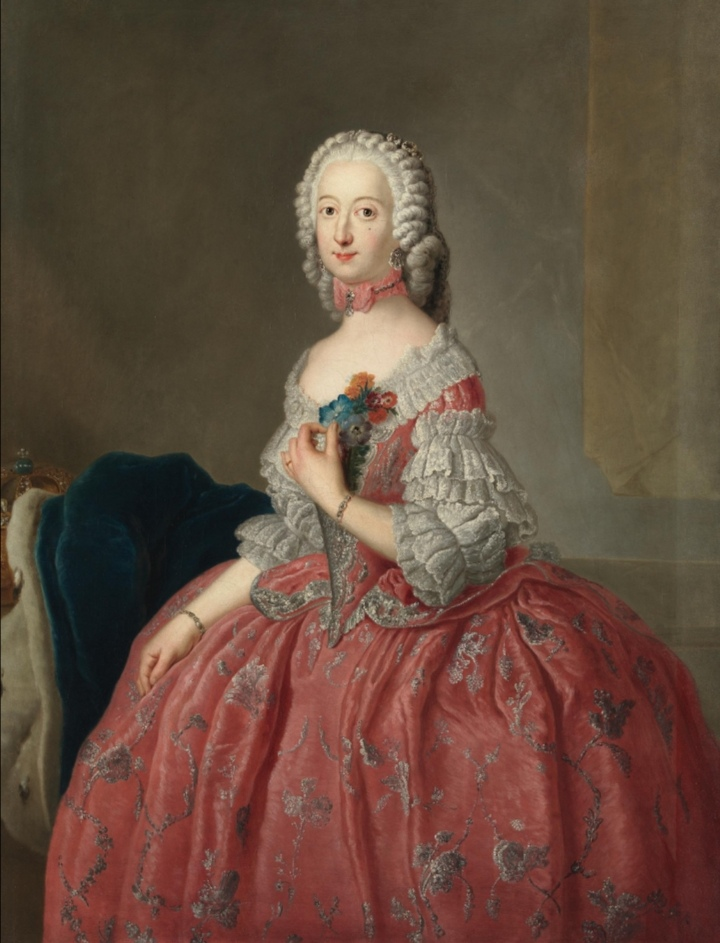
Philippine Charlotte of Prussia, Duchess of Brunswick-Wolfenbüttel, portrait by Antoine Pesne c. 1744

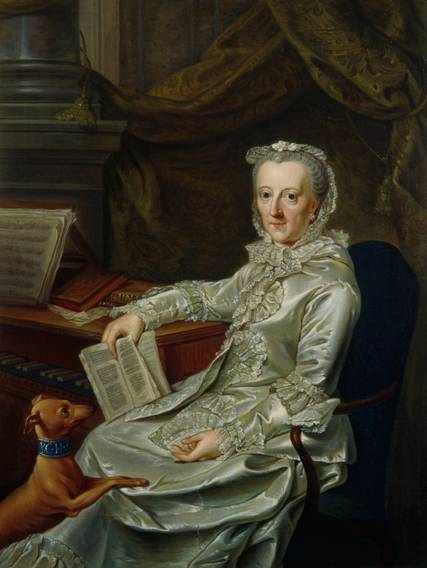
Princess Philippine Charlotte by Anna Rosina de Gasc (1765-1770)

She raised her son Charles in reverence of her brother Frederick, gave him a humanist education with Abbé Jerusalem among his tutors, and sent him on Grand Tour with the archaeologist Johann Joachim Winckelmann as his companion. In 1773, Charles I was obliged to make their son regent, and in 1780, he died, and was succeeded by him.

The Swedish Princess Hedwig Elizabeth Charlotte described her, as well as her family, at the time of a visit in August 1799:

Our cousin, the Duke, arrived immediately the next morning. [...] After he left us, I visited the Dowager Duchess, the aunt of my consort. She is an agreeable, highly educated and well respected lady, but by now so old that she has almost lost her memory.

Philippine Charlotte left to the Wolfenbüttel Library her own collection of 4,000 volumes. She is buried in Braunschweig Cathedral.

Two paintings now in the Wittum Palace in Weimar depict Philippine Charlotte with her little dog next to a harpsichord – a style later adopted for a portrait of her daughter Anna Amalia, located in the same place. A fireplace screen embroidered by the duchess is located in the concert room of the New Palace in Potsdam.

== Issue ==
Issue
Name	Portrait	Lifespan	Notes
Charles II; Duke of Brunswick-Wolfenbüttel		9 October 1735- 16 October 1806	Married Princess Augusta of Great Britain, had issue
Georg Franz		29 September 1736- 10 December 1737	Died in infancy
Sophie Caroline Marie; Margravine of Brandenburg-Bayreuth		7 October 1737- 21 December 1817	Married Frederick, Margrave of Brandenburg-Bayreuth and had no issue
Christian Ludwig		13 November 1738- 12 April 1742	Died in childhood
Anna Amalia; Duchess of Saxe-Weimar and Eisenach		24 October 1739- 10 April 1807	Married Ernest Augustus II, Duke of Saxe-Weimar-Eisenach and had issue
Frederick Augustus		29 October 1740- 8 October 1805	Married Princess Friederike Sophie Charlotte Auguste of Württemberg-Oels and had no issue
Albrecht Heinrich		26 February 1742- 8 August 1761	Died unmarried;
Luise		18 December 1743- 22 February 1744	Died in infancy
Wilhelm Adolf		18 May 1745- 24 August 1770	Died unmarried;
Elisabeth Christine; Crown Princess of Prussia		8 November 1746- 18 February 1840	Married Frederick William, Crown Prince of Prussia and had issue The marriage was dissolved in 1769
Friederike		8 April 1748- 22 January 1758	Died in childhood
Augusta Dorothea; Abbess of Gandersheim		2 October 1749- 10 March 1810	
Maximilian Julius Leopold		11 October 1752- 24 April 1785	Died unmarried

== Ancestry ==
Ancestors of Princess Philippine Charlotte of Prussia

8. Frederick William, Elector of Brandenburg
4. Frederick I of Prussia
9. Louise Henriette of Orange-Nassau
2. Frederick William I of Prussia
10. Ernest Augustus, Elector of Hanover (=12)
5. Sophia Charlotte of Hanover
11. Sophia of the Palatinate (=13)
1. Princess Philippine Charlotte of Prussia
12. Ernest Augustus, Elector of Hanover (=10)
6. George I of Great Britain
13. Sophia of the Palatinate (=11)
3. Sophia Dorothea of Hanover
14. George William, Duke of Brunswick-Lüneburg
7. Sophia Dorothea of Celle
15. Éléonore Desmier d'Olbreuse

German nobility
Preceded by Princess Antoinette of Brunswick-Wolfenbüttel	Duchess consort of Brunswick-Wolfenbüttel; 1735–1780	Vacant Title next held by Princess Augusta of Great Britain
