= Leopold of Brunswick-Wolfenbüttel =

Prussian general

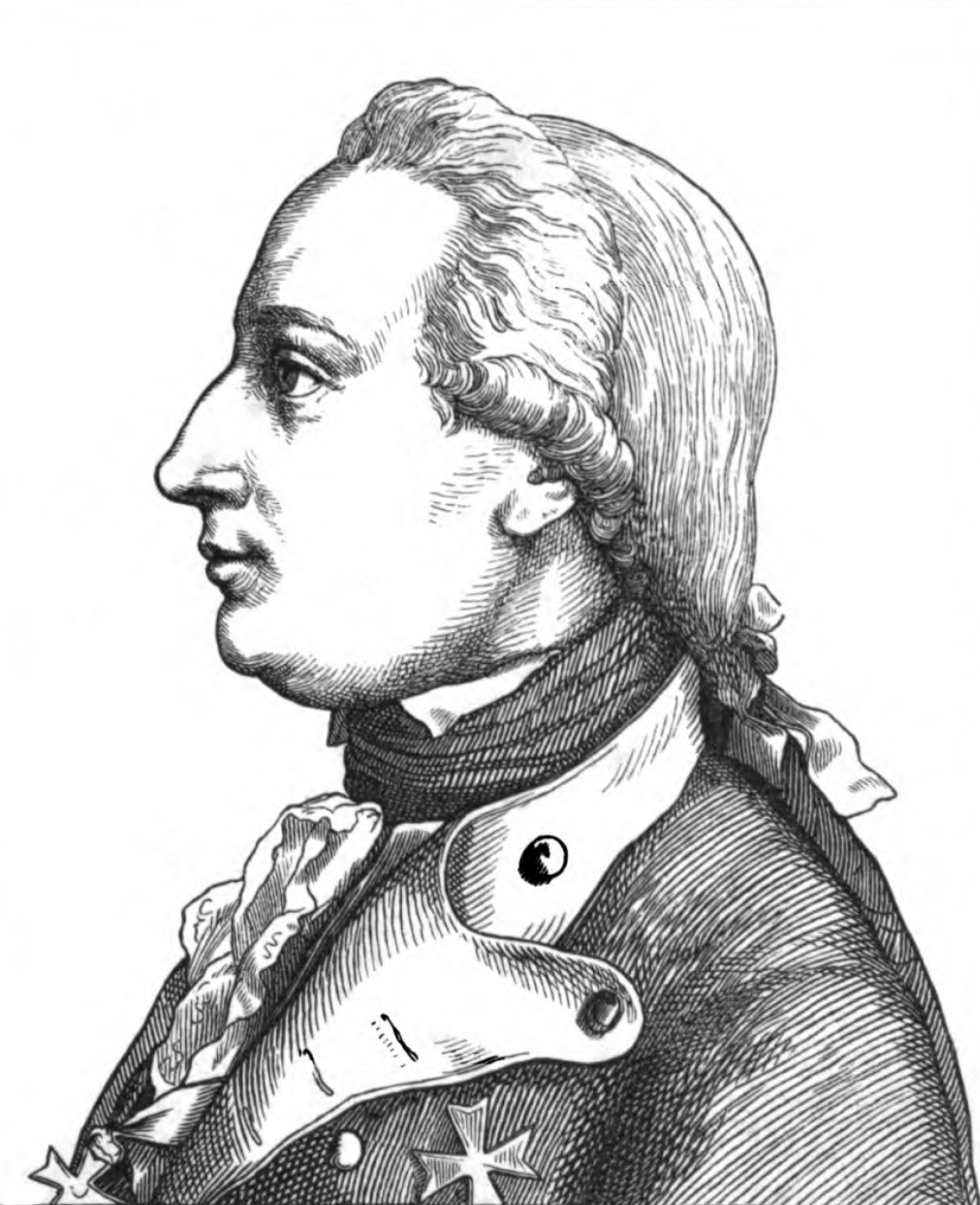
Leopold of Brunswick-Wolfenbüttel

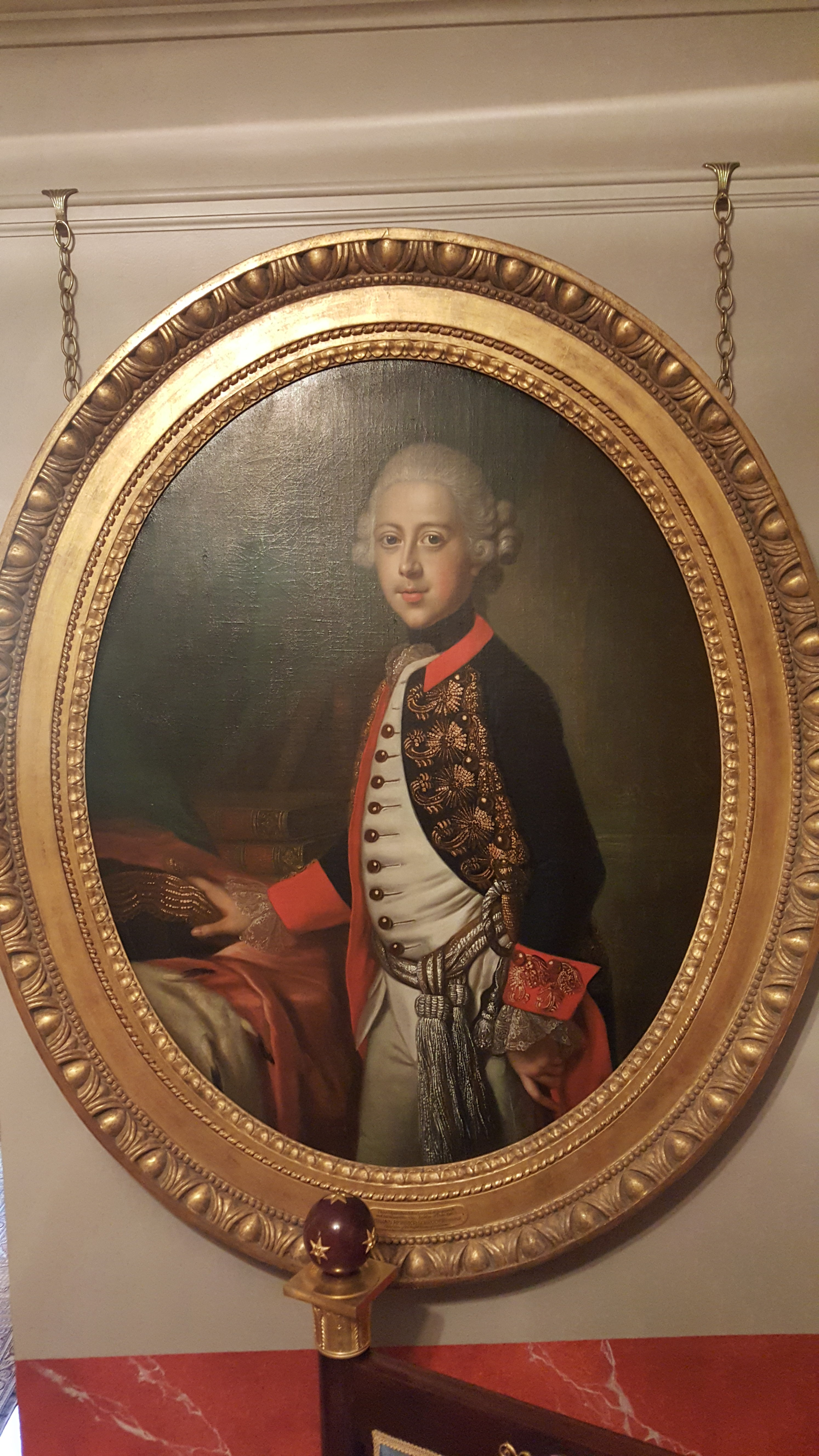
PORTRAIT OF DUKE MAXIMILIAN JULIUS LEOPOLD OF BRUNSWICK AND LÜNEBURG (1752-1785), BROTHER OF DUKE KARL II OF BRUNSWICK.

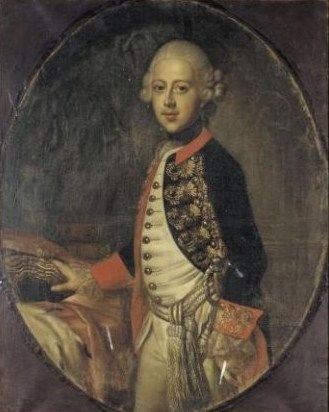
The young Leopold in the uniform of an officer - painting by Johann Heinrich Schröder (1757-1812)

Maximilian Julius Leopold of Brunswick-Wolfenbüttel, Prince of Brunswick-Wolfenbüttel and nominal Duke of Brunswick and Lüneburg (12 October 1752, Wolfenbüttel - 27 April 1785, Frankfurt (Oder)) was a Prussian major general and one of the few high officers in the armies of the late European Enlightenment, for whom the subordinate soldier was more than an expendable tool in the hands of the commanding officer. Princely charity towards soldiers and citizens and the circumstances of his death made Leopold famous.

== Early life ==
Leopold was the 13th child and the youngest son of Duke Karl I of Braunschweig-Wolfenbüttel and his wife Philippine Charlotte of Prussia, a sister of the Prussian King Frederick II. He received his education from Enlightenment educators such as Johann Friedrich Wilhelm Jerusalem, Karl Christian Gärtner and Johann Arnold Ebert who influenced him greatly. His teachers brought Leopold to a simple religious piety that demanded an action-determined love for all humanity. The foundations of this belief lay in the broad field between neology and Lutheran orthodoxy.

== The origin of the legend of Leopold's sacrificial death ==
During the great flood of the Oder in 1785, Leopold, who eagerly wanted to take part in the municipal authorities' aid measures, drowned at the age of 32.

The legend that the Duke tried to rescue citizens trapped by the flood from mortal danger and died in the process, was born immediately after the accident in Frankfurt and spread at lightning speed. Its originator was the pastor of the French Reformed Congregation in Frankfurt, Jacques Papin, who hastily published it in the Berlin journals and also communicated it to his father-in-law, the engraver Daniel Chodowiecki, in Berlin. Out of pity for the flood victims and in honor of the heroically sunk duke, Chodowiecki created an engraving in good faith, in which he incorporated the essential statements of the legend and dramatized them: a person fighting for his life in the raging Oder; the debris floating on the water; Duke Leopold am Ufer in a final dispute with citizens who wanted to prevent him from taking a boat trip, among others. with the indication that he owed it to his high class not to expose himself to unnecessary danger. Chodowiecki put a related "statement" by the Duke under the picture. This sentence also came from the pen of the son-in-law, who did not reproduce a statement by the Duke, but hit a nerve of the time: "I am a person like you, and here it depends on saving people." Report, sentence and engraving caused a sensation.

Socially and politically aspiring citizens saw in the “report” of Leopold's speech, deed and death, their own ideal of overcoming their limits in the corporate society emerged. The "commitment of his life to save others" did not let her rest. So Chodowiecki unselfishly determined the proceeds from the sale of his copperplate engravings to help the water-damaged, and Frankfurt, Berlin, Brunswick and other Freemasons worked intensively, the news of Leopold's selfless commitment to his fellow citizens and of his heroic downfall throughout the Reichto spread and celebrate it. They expressed their enthusiasm not only in the creation of Leopold monuments. They also looked after the children of the Frankfurt regimental school in a generous foundation. In this way, the Freemasons advertised new members and the ideas of the Enlightenment simultaneously with word and image. They were actively supported by many journals and magazines.

== What really happened. The suppression of the facts ==
In April 1785, however, the reality was different. Although Leopold was urgently advised not to venture into the dangerous water without necessity, he ignored the warnings and boarded a boat, not to save people, but, as he said to the skippers accompanying him, to look after them personally have his living on the other side soldiers to care. The boat turned over. Leopold, so revered in Frankfurt, paid for his zeal with his life.

This factual connection was seen in the spring of 1785, but covered by the wave of grief, then the strong sympathy for the "hero" who had sacrificed himself. Corrections were hardly made or not noticed. Chodowiecki e.g. B. retouched the man fighting for his life in the water from the copper engraving reproduced here; but no observer was inclined to enter into such subtleties. The few statements that reproduced the reality of 1785 were condemned to memory, then to oblivion and were only rediscovered in the 20th century.
