= Elisabeth Christine of Brunswick-Wolfenbüttel, Crown Princess of Prussia =

Elisabeth Christine
- Crown Princess of Prussia
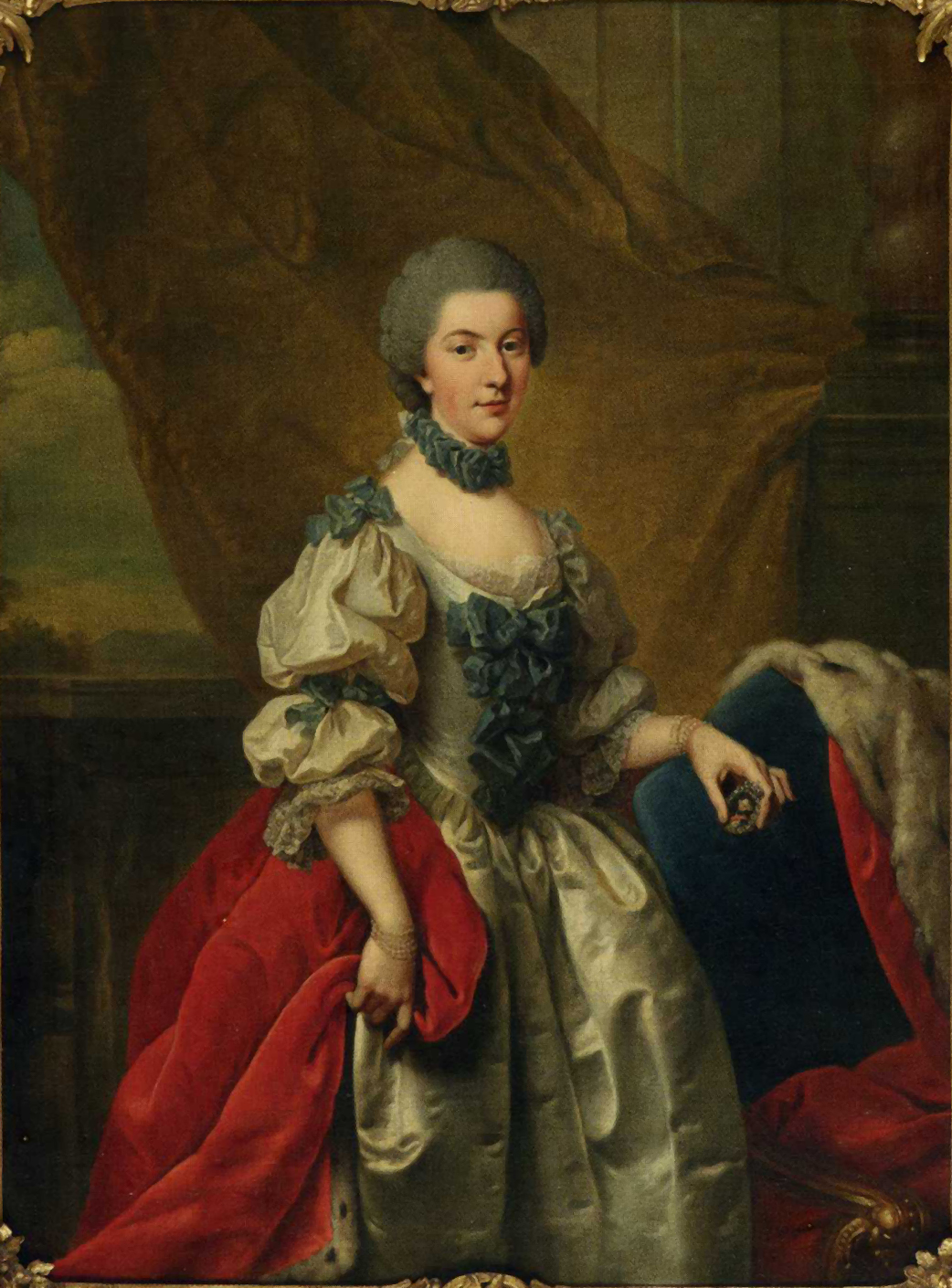
- Portrait by Johann Georg Ziesenis, 1765
- Born: 8 November 1746; Wolfenbüttel, Principality of Brunswick-Wolfenbüttel, Holy Roman Empire
- Died: 18 February 1840 (aged 93); Stettin, Kingdom of Prussia, German Confederation
- Burial: 19 July 1849; Ducal Castle Crypt, Stettin
- Spouse: Frederick William, Crown Prince of Prussia (m. 1765; div. 1769)
- Issue: Princess Frederica Charlotte, Duchess of York and Albany
Names
- Elisabeth Christine Ulrike
- House: Brunswick-Bevern (by birth); Hohenzollern (by marriage)
- Father: Charles I, Duke of Brunswick-Wolfenbüttel
- Mother: Philippine Charlotte of Prussia

Elisabeth Christine Ulrike of Brunswick-Wolfenbüttel (8 November 1746 – 18 February 1840), was Crown Princess of Prussia as the first wife of Crown Prince Frederick William, her cousin and the future king, Frederick William II of Prussia.

Born in Wolfenbüttel to Charles I, Duke of Brunswick-Wolfenbüttel and Philippine Charlotte of Prussia, she married her double first cousin, Fredrick William, at the insistence of Fredrick the Great, who wanted heirs. The marriage started off with promise with the birth of a child, Frederica Charlotte but the couple soon became unhappy, due to adultery on both sides as well as her hot temper. The king initially tolerated these affairs, hoping for more children from the couple but when Elisabeth became pregnant by one of her lovers, Fredrick decided dissolving the marriage was the best idea and after only three years of marriage they divorced in 1769.

Elisabeth was banished from court and then first put under house arrest in Küstrin Castle but was then put in the care of her cousin, Duke Augustus William of Brunswick-Bevern at the Ducal Castle of Stettin. In 1774, after an attempted escape to Venice which only failed when her accomplice disappeared, Elisabeth was granted a summer residence at Jasenitz. After the death of Fredrick the Great in 1786 her living conditions much improved and occasionally her former spouse visited her. During her last years, she only received one caller, the Crown prince, and on the 18 February 1840 she died at the age of ninety-three, outliving her former husband, all of her siblings as well as her only child who Elisabeth hadn't seen since her divorce almost seventy years previously.

== Background and family ==
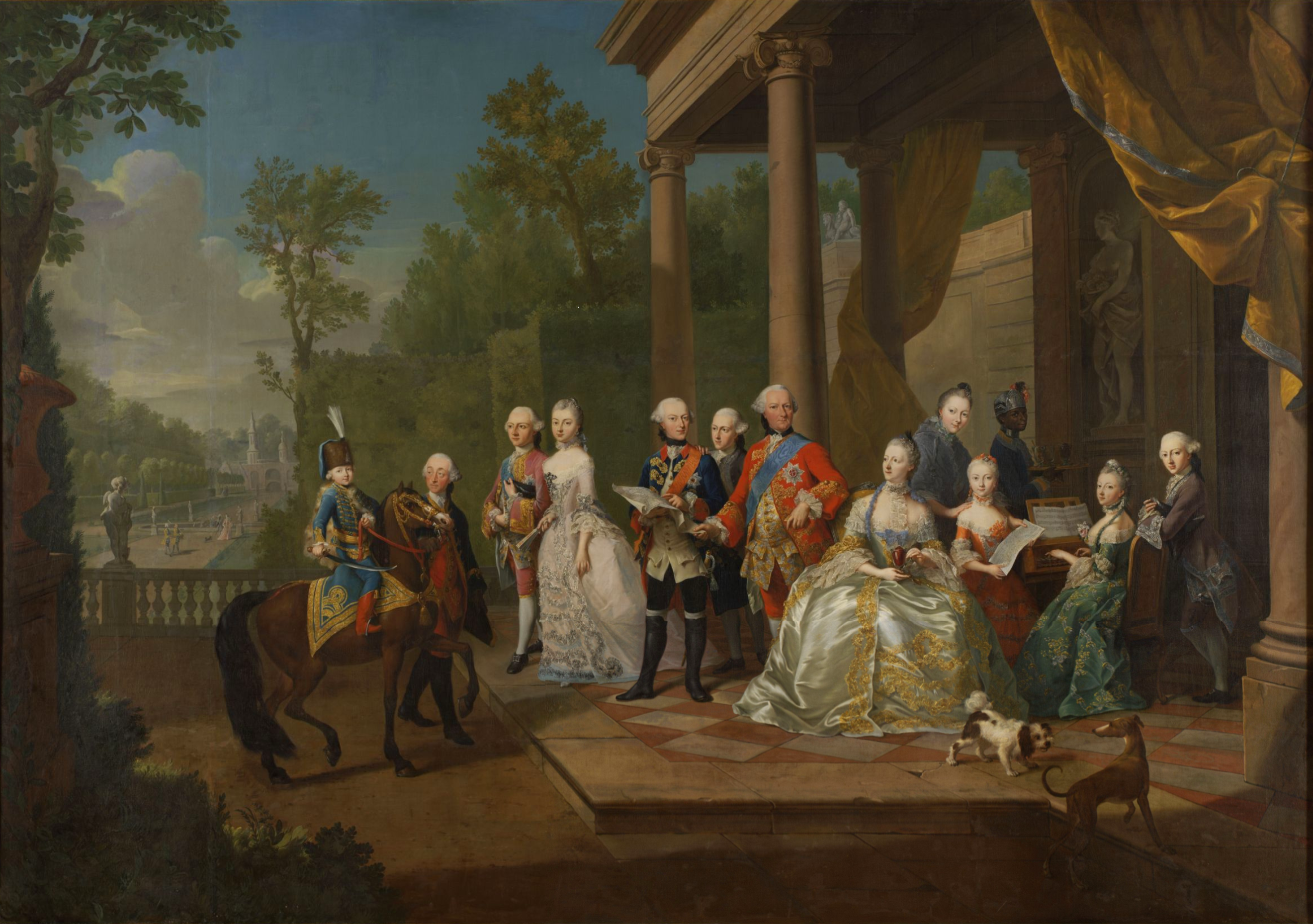
Elisabeth and her family by Johann Heinrich Tischbein, 1762

Elizabeth Christine was the seventh child and third daughter of Charles I, Duke of Brunswick-Lüneburg and Princess Philippine Charlotte of Prussia. Her father was brother to the Queen of Prussia and the Queen of Denmark, while her mother was a sister of Frederick the Great. The luckless Ivan VI of Russia, who spent almost his entire life in captivity, was a first cousin. Elizabeth Christine held the rank of Duchess in Brunswick with the style of Serene Highness and the title of Princess ("Her Serene Highness Princess Elisabeth Christine").

== Marriage ==
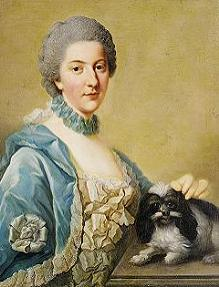
Portrait of Elisabeth Christine by Johann Georg Ziesenis, c. 1765

King Frederick the Great was childless, and his heir presumptive was Crown Prince Frederick William. The king and his court were naturally anxious to see the crown prince settled into a suitable marriage. As the maternal niece of the king of Prussia and the paternal niece of the queen of Prussia, Elisabeth Christine was felt to be congenial and suitable to marry her cousin Crown Prince Frederick William and be the mother of next generation of the Prussian royal family.

The wedding ceremony between Elisabeth Christine and Crown Prince Frederick William was originally planned to take place at Charlottenburg Palace's Chapel, but in the end took place on 14 July 1765, on the family country estate Schloss Salzdahlum.

Elisabeth Christine was described as handsome in appearance and graceful in manner, and as a good dancer; other, more ambiguous epithets were also used: she was lively, high-spirited and impetuous in disposition, and she was engaging and outgoing in her interaction with everybody. Her beauty, intelligence and spirited manner made her a favorite of her uncle the king, who otherwise seldom took interest in women.

King Frederick had hoped that the marriage would quickly produce an heir, and was delighted when Elisabeth Christine became pregnant not long after the wedding. It was a disappointment to him when Elisabeth Christine gave birth to a girl, Princess Frederica Charlotte, on 7 May 1767. Nevertheless, King Frederick II gifted his niece a breakfast service worth 40,000 thalers as a childbirth present.

Count Ernst Ahasverus Heinrich von Lehndorff (1727–1811), Chamberlain at the royal court of Prussia, noted in his diary: "I'm convinced she would have preferred 3,000 thalers in cash". On her part, Elizabeth Christine showed little maternal feelings: she would sometimes call her daughter "little rubbish".

=== Divorce ===
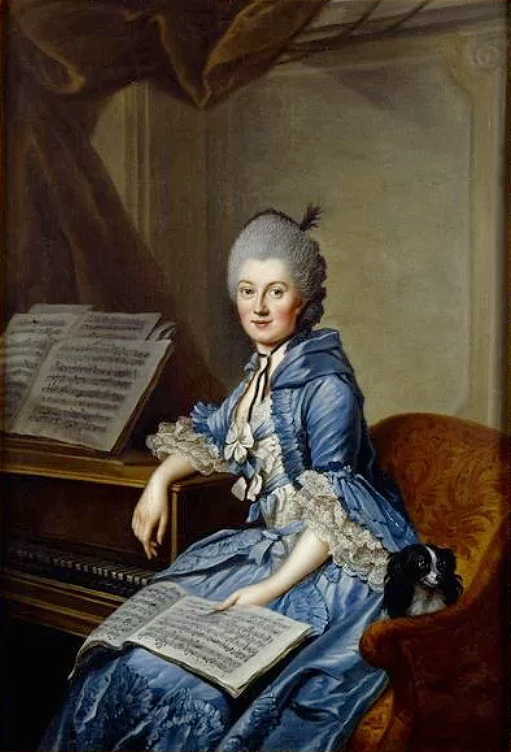
Portrait of Elisabeth Christine by Johann Georg Ziesenis, 1769

The king may have imagined this to be the first of many children, and looked forward to the birth of an heir, but it was not to be. Already at this time, Elisabeth Christine was having an affair with a musician named Müller. While the musician Müller was sent away without making any fuss, the marriage was on the rocks in a most alarming manner. On his part, Frederick William confirmed to the norms of his day, and considered that his wife should make no fuss if he indulged in casual sex with sundry dancers and actresses, because they could never take her place, and all he wanted from them was a night of revelry. Elisabeth Christine felt otherwise, and took her disagreement to the point of vengeance. The couple were both very young indeed, and both very hot-headed. In the Vertraute Briefe, the marital relationship of Elisabeth Christine is described as follows:

"Frederic William was now twenty-one years of age; his disposition was good, but his capacity was slender; he resembled the Brunswicks in person, being six feet two in height, and proportionally stout. But he was unfortunately addicted to the grossest sensuality, and his time, when not occupied by his military duties, was spent with vile women and other loose companions. His young wife resented this conduct in the highest degree; wounded alike in her wifehood and her womanhood, she not only separated herself from the crown Prince, and haughtily refused him admission to her presence, but, alas! She sacrificed even virtue to revenge."

If the king had very little sympathy for the adultery of men, he had none at all for that of women, least of all when the legitimacy of his own successors may be called into question. The king had little patience for indiscipline or human frailty, and he could hardly understand what moved people to commit adultery. He roundly admonished his nephew for consorting with low women. Elisabeth Christine, supposedly to spite her husband, began having affairs with young officers of the Potsdam Guard. At first, the King treated her scandals leniently, hoping for improvement and wanting to forget everything that had happened. However, as was noted by Friedrich Wilhelm von Thulemeyer, the Crown Princess became pregnant by her lover, a musician called Pietro. By late January 1769 they planned to escape to Italy, but she was betrayed. On a masked ball given by Prince Henry in celebration of the king's birthday on 24 January 1769, the Crown Prince was informed of her affairs by an anonymous person hidden behind a mask, which enraged him despite his own adultery, and made him demand a divorce. Elisabeth Christine's correspondence would have also revealed that she first planned to poison her husband, her brother Prince William of Brunswick (who was involved in the plot) and her uncle the King, and a letter from her to the musician Pietro was also intercepted with the following content: "My dear Pietro, come to Berlin [...]. I can not live without you. You have to kidnap me from here [...]. I would rather eat dry bread than live longer with that fat oaf".

King Frederick was initially unwilling to agree to a divorce, as his sympathy was greater for Elisabeth Christine than for Frederick William, but the Crown Prince insisted in his demand for a divorce, and urged in agreement with the King the annulment of his marriage on grounds to avoid claims of illegitimate offspring on the Prussian throne, to which the Brunswick court agreed. The musician Pietro was arrested and taken to Magdeburg, where he was reportedly beheaded. Elisabeth Christine terminated her pregnancy with drugs. Her brother, Prince William of Brunswick, was aware of her affairs, and his attempts to hide them and defend her exposed him to suspicions that he himself had been involved in them.

The divorce was officially pronounced on 18 April 1769. Only three months after the separation, on 14 July, Frederick the Great forced his nephew to remarry, with Frederica Louisa of Hesse-Darmstadt. In a letter wrote to his sister (and Elisabeth Christine's mother) Philippine Charlotte, the King summarized all the events:

The husband, young and immoral, practiced a debauched life daily; the princess his wife, who was in the prime of her beauty, found herself grossly insulted by the low regard that her own charm had over him. Her vivacity and good opinion of herself, took her to avenge the offenses against her. Soon she found herself in such debauchery that hardly inferior to those of her husband; the disaster broke out and became public.

=== Later life ===
Elisabeth Christine was firstly banished to Küstrin Fortress and later placed under house arrest as a Prisoner of state in the Ducal Castle of Stettin under the care of her cousin, Duke Augustus William of Brunswick-Bevern. She lost the title of Royal Highness and was given the title of Serene Highness.

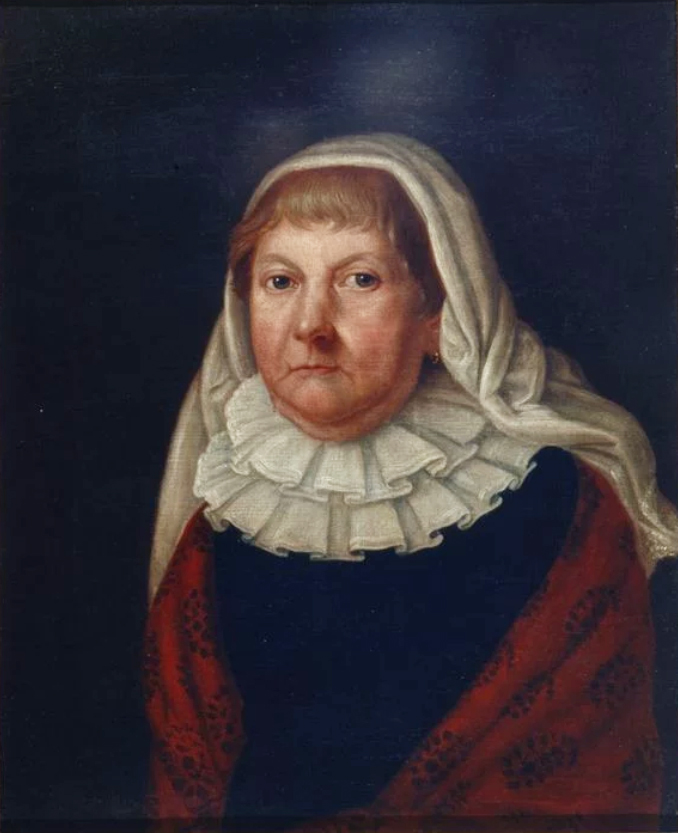
Elisabeth Christine in old age

At first, she lived in harsh circumstances. Being of an extrovert nature, she suffered from her isolation: reportedly, she sometimes placed all the chairs in a long row in her apartments, and danced "Anglaises" between them to ease her boredom.

She did at one point attempt to escape, and made an agreement with an officer to help her escape to Venice, but the plan was never put in fruition as her accomplice suddenly disappeared. Eventually, King Frederick improved her living conditions, and in 1774, she was given a summer residence in the medieval cloister in Jasenitz.

After the death of Frederick the Great in 1786, she received a visit from her former spouse, and during his reign, her conditions improved: she was given permission to entertain visitors, and to walk, and ride on horseback in the areas of the town. According to Mirabeau, she was offered her release, but declined, as she had by that time grown used to her lifestyle. An incident is known, when she slapped an officer who insisted upon opening a New Year's gift from her mother: when he sent a complaint to the king, he answered "no man could ever be insulted by a blow from the hand of so fair a lady."

Elisabeth Christine never saw her daughter or siblings again; during her later life, King Frederick William IV was the only one who visited her. When the French army occupied Stettin in 1806, the so-called Elisabeth of Stettin moved to a small country estate outside the city walls, which she called Landhaus Friedrichsgnade ('Villa Frederick's mercy').

Elisabeth Christine died at the age of 93, having survived her parents, all her siblings, her daughter, nieces and nephews, and her former husband. At her death, all the bells of the city rang. She had a mausoleum built for herself in her beloved park because she didn't want to be buried with her relatives in the Ducal Brunswick Crypt. When the park was handed to private hands, she was reburied in the Chapel of the Ducal Castle of Stettin on the night of 19 July 1849. Other sources, however, indicated that she was later reburied in the cathedral of Kraków.

== Issue ==
- Princess Frederica Charlotte of Prussia (7 May 1767 – 6 August 1820) married Prince Frederick, Duke of York and Albany, but remained childless.

== Ancestry ==
Ancestors of Elisabeth Christine of Brunswick-Wolfenbüttel, Crown Princess of Prussia

8. Ferdinand Albert I, Duke of Brunswick-Wolfenbüttel-Bevern
4. Ferdinand Albert II, Duke of Brunswick-Wolfenbüttel
9. Princess Christine of Hesse-Eschwege
2. Charles I, Duke of Brunswick-Wolfenbüttel
10. Louis Rudolph, Duke of Brunswick-Wolfenbüttel
5. Duchess Antoinette of Brunswick-Wolfenbüttel
11. Princess Christine Louise of Oettingen-Oettingen
1. Duchess Elisabeth Christine of Brunswick-Wolfenbüttel
12. Frederick I of Prussia
6. Frederick William I of Prussia
13. Princess Sophia Charlotte of Hanover
3. Princess Philippine Charlotte of Prussia
14. George I of Great Britain
7. Princess Sophia Dorothea of Hanover
15. Princess Sophia Dorothea of Celle
