= Duchess of York =

Title of nobility

Duchess of York is the principal title held by the wife of the Duke of York. Three of the twelve Dukes of York either did not marry or had already assumed the throne prior to marriage, while two of the dukes married twice; therefore, there have been eleven Duchesses of York.

== Duchesses of York ==
The eleven Duchesses of York (and the dates the individuals held that title):

Person	Name	Coat of Arms	Birth	Marriage	Became Duchess of York	Spouse	Change in style	Death
	Infanta Isabella of Castile		1355	11 July 1372	6 August 1385	Edmund of Langley	23 December 1392	
	Lady Joan Holland		1380	4 November 1393		Edmund of Langley	1 August 1402; Husband's death; became Dowager Duchess of York	12 April 1434
	Philippa de Mohun			before 7 October 1398	1 August 1402	Edward of Norwich	25 October 1415; Husband's death; became Dowager Duchess of York	17 July 1431
	Lady Cecily Neville		3 May 1415	October 1429 (or earlier)		Richard Plantagenet	30 December 1460; Husband's death; became Dowager Duchess of York	31 May 1495
	Lady Anne de Mowbray		10 December 1472	15 January 1478		Richard of Shrewsbury	19 November 1481	
	Lady Anne Hyde		12 March 1637	3 September 1660		James Stuart	31 March 1671	
	Princess Mary of Modena		5 October 1658	21 November 1673		James Stuart	6 February 1685; Husband acceded to throne as James II; became queen consort	7 May 1718
	Princess Frederica Charlotte of Prussia		7 May 1767	29 September 1791		Prince Frederick	6 August 1820	
	Princess Victoria Mary of Teck		26 May 1867	6 July 1893		Prince George	6 May 1910; Husband acceded to throne as George V; became queen consort	24 March 1953
	Lady Elizabeth Bowes-Lyon		4 August 1900	26 April 1923		Prince Albert	11 December 1936; Husband acceded to throne as George VI; became queen consort	30 March 2002
	Sarah Ferguson		15 October 1959	23 July 1986		Prince Andrew	30 May 1996; Divorced; assumed the style of Sarah, Duchess of York; 17 October 2025 ceased using courtesy title of Duchess of York upon Prince Andrew relinquishing his use of the title. Styled as Sarah Ferguson	

In 1791, Princess Frederica Charlotte of Prussia (1791–1820) married Prince Frederick, Duke of York and Albany (second son of King George III); she thus became HRH The Duchess of York and Albany. Her husband held one double dukedom (of York and Albany) rather than two. The Duchess received a warm welcome to Great Britain but following a troubled relationship with her husband, the couple separated. The two previous dukes of York and Albany had never married; since her husband was the last duke of York and Albany, Frederica was the only duchess with that double title.

== Duchess of York eponyms ==
=== Ships ===
- HMS Duchess of York (1801), built in Calcutta in 1801 and wrecked off Madagascar in 1811.
- HMS Duchess of York (1898), a paddle steamer built by Barclay, Curle & Co. Ltd., Glasgow, used as a First World War minesweeper. Later renamed Duchess of Cornwall to allow for a new ship to take its name.
- SS Duchess of York (1928), a steam turbine ocean liner built by John Brown & Co Ltd., Clydebank for Canadian Pacific Steamships. Sunk after being bombed in 1943.

=== Other ===
- Duchess of York Ward, opened in 1935 at the Royal Hospital and Home for Incurables.
- Rosa 'Duchess of York', named in 1994.

== Bibliography ==
- Deborah C. Fisher (2005). Princesses of Wales. University of Wales Press. ISBN 9780708319369.
