= Johann Friedrich Wilhelm Jerusalem =

German Lutheran theologian (1709-1789)

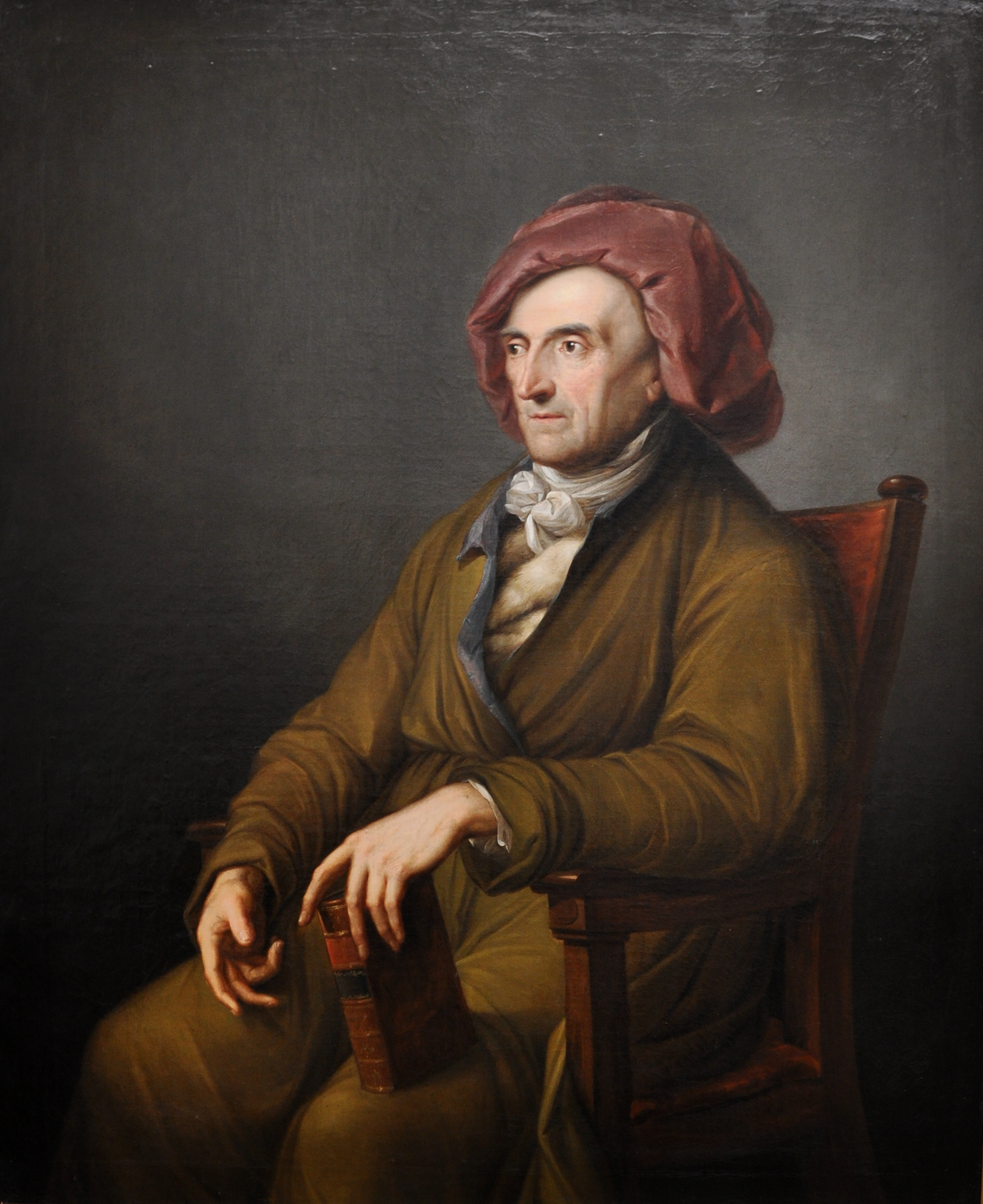
Jerusalem by Friedrich Georg Weitsch, 1790

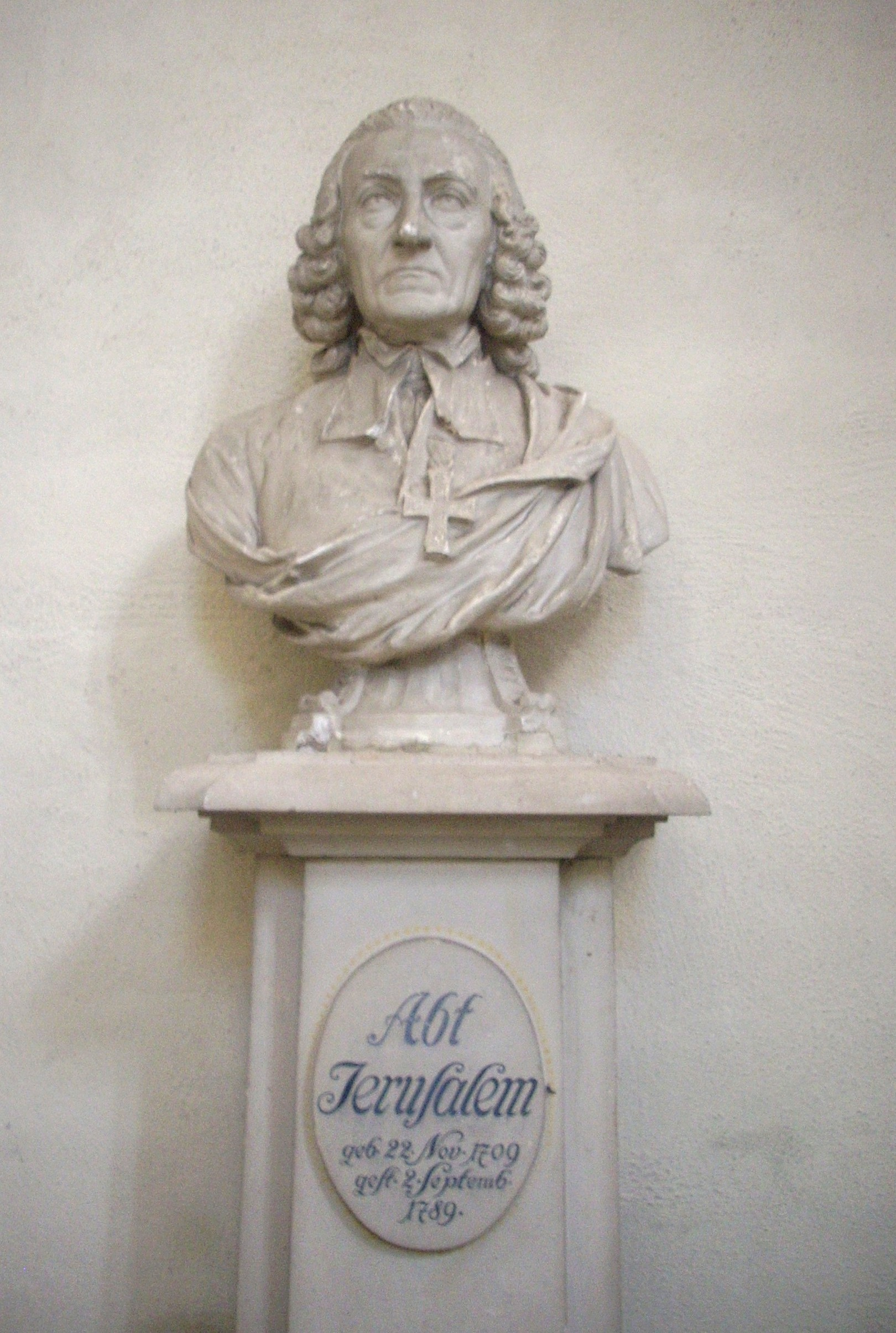
Bust on his grave

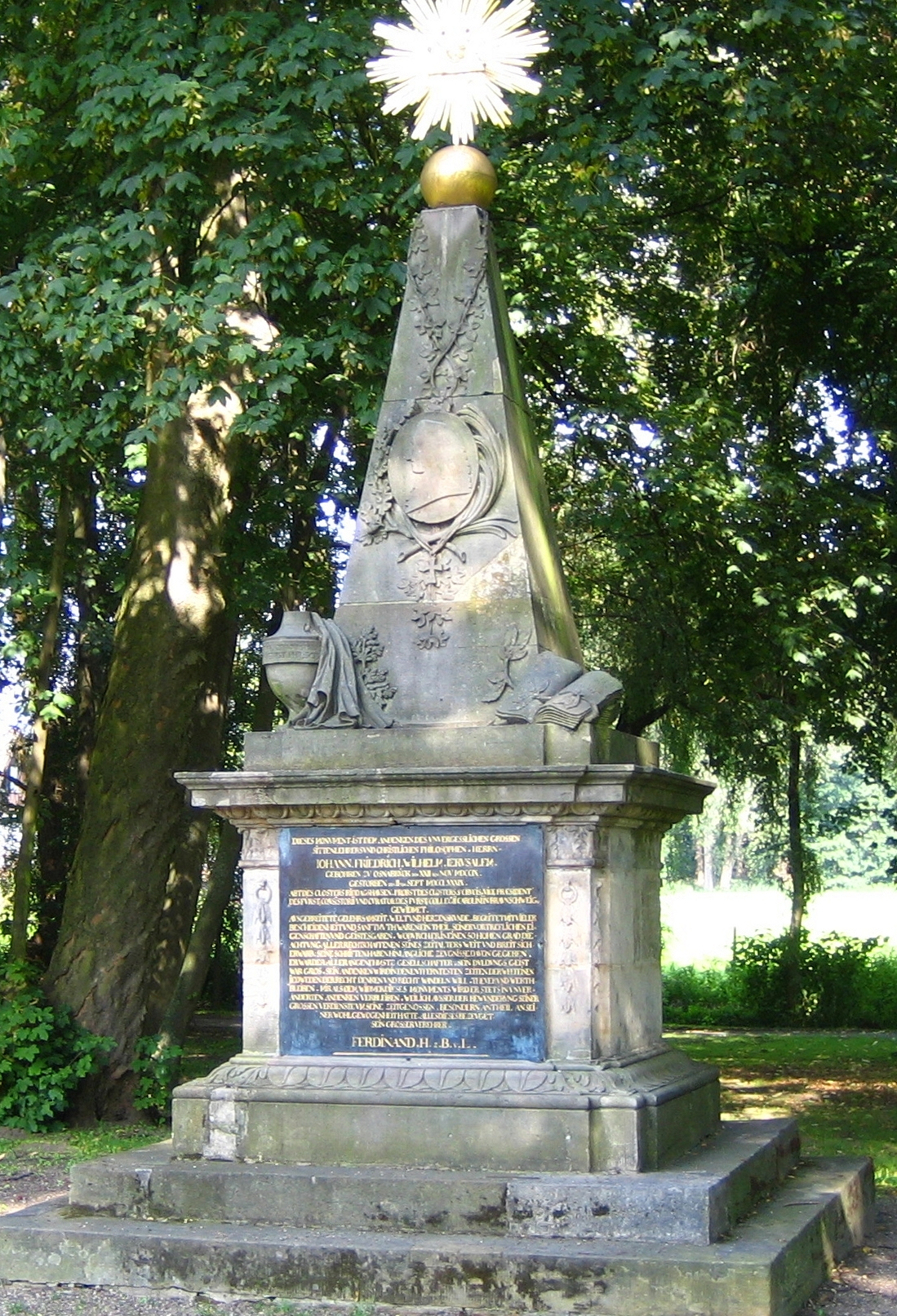
Monument to him in the Schlossgarten Vechelde

Johann Friedrich Wilhelm Jerusalem (22 November 1709 - 2 September 1789) was a heterodox german lutheran theologian during the Age of Enlightenment. He was also known as "Abt Jerusalem".

He was court-preacher and a major advisor to Charles I, Duke of Brunswick-Wolfenbüttel, to whom he suggested the foundation of the Collegium Carolinum in 1745 - this was the forerunner of the present-day TU Braunschweig. He also had a strong influence on the Duchy of Brunswick's educational policy as well as becoming one of the most important German theologians of his era.

He is considered one of the heads of the German school of natural theology, which radically departed from conventional Lutheran theological dogma. His main work, "Reflections on the Noble Truths of Religion" looked into speculative-universalist philosophy of history and harmonised salvation history with the secular history of progress.

== Life ==
Born in Osnabrück, he was the son of the town's Lutheran pastor. On his father's death in 1726, he went to study theology at Leipzig and Wittenberg, graduating with a master's degree in 1731. He then spent two years in the Dutch Republic before his return to Germany in 1734. He was given a court position in Göttingen in 1737 before spending several years in England. He then became a private tutor in the household of Friedrich von Spörcken in Hannover and then in 1742 he was summoned to the Brunswick court, where he became court preacher and tutor to the Duke's son and heir Charles William Ferdinand.

In 1742 he married Martha Christina (née Pfeiffer), widow of a man whose surname was Albrecht. They had five children, including Karl Wilhelm, whose 1772 suicide provided part of the inspiration for Goethe's The Sorrows of Young Werther. Jerusalem himself died in Brunswick and is buried in the abbey church at Riddagshausen Abbey, of which he had been made abbot in 1752.

== Abt Jerusalem-Preis ==
A prize named after him has been jointly awarded since 2009 by the Braunschweigische Wissenschaftliche Gesellschaft, the Evangelical Lutheran Church in Brunswick, the Braunschweig University of Technology and the Stiftung Braunschweigischer Kulturbesitz for "outstanding scientific contributions to the dialogue between theology, biology and technology". Its winners have been:

- 2009: Nicole C. Karafyllis
- 2012: Wolfgang König
- 2015: Gerd de Bruyn
- 2017: Jürgen Osterhammel

== Works ==
- (uncompleted masterwork): Betrachtungen über die vornehmsten Wahrheiten der Religion (Reflections on the Noble Truths of Religion), 1768–1779, zahlreiche weitere Auflagen; 1770 franz. Übersetzung, ebenso ins Holländische und Schwedische.
- Andreas Urs Sommer (ed.): Johann Friedrich Wilhelm Jerusalem: Schriften. Reprint der Schriften mit einer Einleitung von Andreas Urs Sommer (Historia Scientiarum). ISSN 1430-8320
  - Band 1: Briefe über die Mosaischen Schriften und Philosophie. Betrachtungen über die vornehmsten Wahrheiten der Religion. Erster Theil. Olms-Weidmann, Hildesheim / Zürich / New York 2007, ISBN 978-3-487-13220-4.
  - Band 2: Betrachtungen über die vornehmsten Wahrheiten der Religion. Zweyter Theil. Olms-Weidmann, Hildesheim/ Zürich/ New York 2007, ISBN 978-3-487-13221-1.
  - Band 3: Betrachtungen über die vornehmsten Wahrheiten der Religion. Zweyten Theils zweyter Band oder viertes Stück. Olms-Weidmann, Hildesheim/ Zürich/ New York 2007, ISBN 978-3-487-13222-8.
  - Band 4: Nachgelassene Schriften. Erster Theil: Fortgesetzte Betrachtungen über die vornehmsten Wahrheiten der Religion. Hinterlaßne Fragmente. Olms-Weidmann, Hildesheim/ Zürich/ New York 2007, ISBN 978-3-487-13223-5.
  - Band 5: Nachgelassene Schriften. Zweyter und letzter Theil. Olms-Weidmann, Hildesheim/ Zürich/ New York 2007, ISBN 978-3-487-13224-2.

== Bibliography (in German) ==
- Wolfdietrich von Kloeden (1992). "JERUSALEM, Johann Friedrich Wilhelm". In Bautz, Friedrich Wilhelm (ed.). Biographisch-Bibliographisches Kirchenlexikon (BBKL) (in German). Vol. 3. Herzberg: Bautz. cols. 62–67. ISBN 3-88309-035-2.
- Friedrich Th. Koldewey: Jerusalem, Johann Friedrich Wilhelm. In: Encyklopädisches Handbuch der Pädagogik. 2. Auflage. Beyer & Mann, Langensalza 1906, S. 660–663.
- Fritz Meyen (1974). "Jerusalem, Johann Friedrich Wilhelm". Neue Deutsche Biographie (in German). Vol. 10. Berlin: Duncker & Humblot. pp. 415–416. (full text online).
- Fritz Meyen: Johann Friedrich Wilhelm Jerusalem, Abt von Riddagshausen (1709–1789). Braunschweigisches Jahrbuch Band 53, 1972, S. 159–182. (mit Bibliografie)
- Wolfgang Erich Müller: Johann Friedrich Wilhelm Jerusalem: eine Untersuchung zur Theologie der „Betrachtung über die vornehmsten Wahrheiten der Religion“. (Theologische Bibliothek Töpelmann, Band 43). de Gruyter, Berlin/ New York 1984, ISBN 3-11-009680-3.
- Klaus Erich Pollmann (ed.): Abt Johann Friedrich Wilhelm Jerusalem (1709–1789). Beiträge zu einem Colloquium anläßlich seines 200. Todestages. (Braunschweiger Werkstücke, Band 32/81). Braunschweig 1991, OCLC 311485810.
- Eberhard Rohse: Abt Jerusalem als literarische Figur. Darstellung und Bild J.F.W.Jerusalems in historischen Romanen Hermann Klenckes und Wilhelm Raabes. In: Pollmann: Abt Johann Friedrich Wilhelm Jerusalem. 1991, S. 127–171.
- Isa Schikorsky: Gelehrsamkeit und Geselligkeit. Abt Johann Friedrich Wilhelm Jerusalem (1709–1789) in seiner Zeit. Ausstellungskatalog. Braunschweig 1989, OCLC 311566618.
- Andreas Urs Sommer: Neologische Geschichtsphilosophie. Johann Friedrich Wilhelm Jerusalems Betrachtungen über die vornehmsten Wahrheiten der Religion. In: Zeitschrift für neuere Theologiegeschichte. Band 9, 2002, S. 169–217.
- Christopher Spehr: Aufklärung und Ökumene. Reunionsversuche zwischen Katholiken und Protestanten im deutschsprachigen Raum des späteren 18. Jahrhunderts. (Beiträge zur historischen Theologie 132). Mohr Siebeck, Tübingen 2005, ISBN 3-16-148576-9, S. 53–84.
- Julius August Wagenmann (1881). "Jerusalem, Johann Friedrich Wilhelm" . Allgemeine Deutsche Biographie (in German). Vol. 13. Leipzig: Duncker & Humblot. pp. 779–783.
- Horst Weigelt: Die Beziehungen Lavaters zu Abt Jerusalem und zu anderen Mitgliedern des Collegium Carolinum. In Pietismus und Neuzeit. Ein Jahrbuch zur Geschichte des neueren Protestantismus. Band 20, 1994, S. 173–190.
