= Invasion of Hanover (1757) =

French invasion of Hanover

- Part of European theater of the Seven Years' War
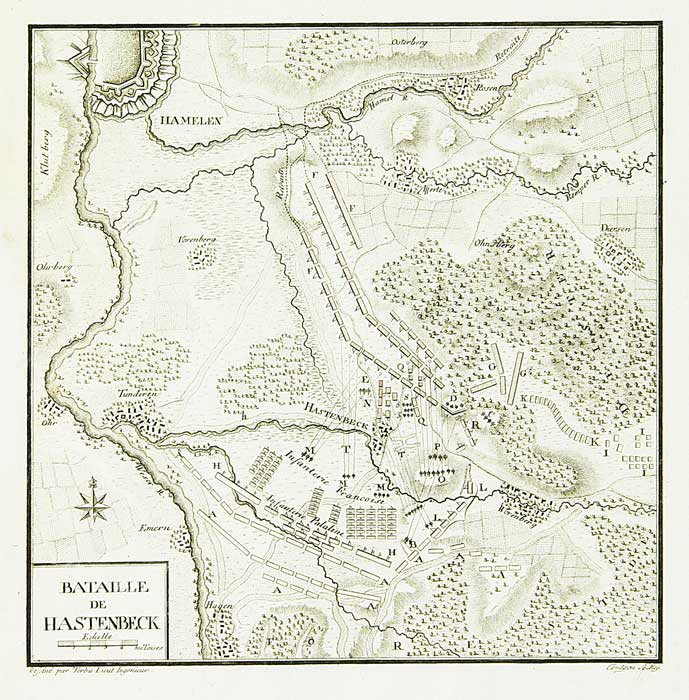
- Battle of Hastenbeck
Date	June–September 1757
Location	Electorate of Hanover, Northern Germany
Result	Initial French victory. Hanover is occupied. French are subsequently driven out of the Electorate.

Belligerents
France	Great Britain; (Province of Hanover) Hanover; Hesse; Brunswick; Prussia

Commanders and leaders
(Kingdom of France) Duc d'Estrées; (Kingdom of France) Prince de Soubise; (Kingdom of France) Duc de Richelieu; (Kingdom of France) Louis, Count of Clermont	(Kingdom of Great Britain) Duke of Cumberland; (Province of Hanover) Ferdinand of Brunswick; (Province of Hanover) Friedrich von Spörcken

Strength
Roughly 100,000	

The Invasion of Hanover took place in 1757 during the Seven Years' War when a French army under Louis Charles César Le Tellier, duc d'Estrées, advanced into the Electorate of Hanover and neighbouring German states after the Battle of Hastenbeck and overran most of Hanover. The action forced the Hanoverian Army of Observation, intended to defend the Electorate, to Stade, on the North Sea coast. At the Convention of Klosterzeven, the Duke of Cumberland agreed to disband his army and to acknowledge the French occupation of the Electorate.

Following pressure by his British ministers, George II of Great Britain, Elector of Hanover, renounced the convention, and the German troops in his pay returned to active operations. By spring 1758, under a new commander, Ferdinand of Brunswick, the Allied forces had driven the French out of Hanover and pushed them back across the River Rhine. Germany remained a major battleground for the remainder of the war, with Ferdinand successfully repulsing further attacks on Hanover and its allies.

== Background ==
Following the outbreak of the first fighting between Britain and France in North America in 1754, the French leadership saw that the limited population, troops and resources available in New France meant that it would ultimately fall to the British if the war was prolonged. France decided to try to gain an equivalent in Europe to exchange for Canada at the negotiating table.

Since 1714 Britain and the Electorate of Hanover had shared a single monarch. George II was ruler of both states, and the French believed that they could exert pressure on him as King of Great Britain by occupying Hanover. In response, Britain initially planned to hire 50,000 Russian troops to defend Hanover but later altered the plan by making an alliance with Prussia and forming an Army of Observation composed of Hanoverian, Brunswick and Hessian troops, mostly paid for by the British government. A number of British officers, such as Jeffrey Amherst and Guy Carleton, were given commands in the force. It was placed under the command of the Duke of Cumberland, the second son of George II. The name "Army of Observation" expressed a hope that the army would serve as a deterrent and have a role merely to observe. In early 1756, when a French invasion of the British Isles seemed imminent, many of the Hanoverian and Hessian troops were shipped to southern England to boost its defences. As the threat of invasion subsided, the troops were then shipped back to Germany again.

The prospect of fighting in Western Germany coincided with a dispute between Austria and Prussia, which went to war in 1756. Following the First Treaty of Versailles, Austria and France formed the Franco-Austrian alliance and sought to defeat the German allies in turn in 1757. A major French force first would sweep through western Germany and defeat and occupy Hanover. Then, the French would swing to attack Prussia from the west while Austria came from the south. France began building up a large force, known as the Army of Westphalia, under Louis Charles César Le Tellier, duc d'Estrées.

== Invasion ==
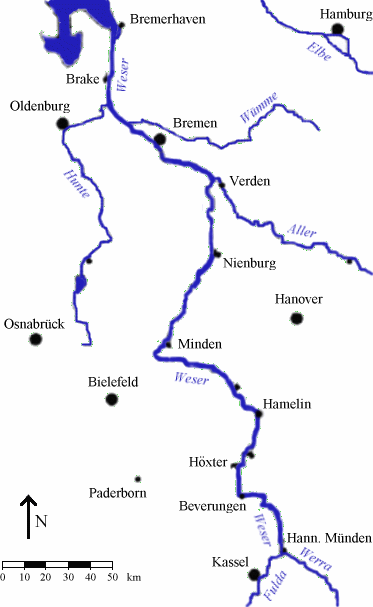
The Weser and the fortresses at Hamelin, Minden, Nienburg and Bremen formed a natural line of defence.

In early June 1757, the French army began to advance towards Hanover once it became clear that there would be no negotiated agreement. The first skirmish between the two forces had taken place on 3 May. Part of the French army was delayed by the Siege of Geldern, which took three months to capture from its Prussian garrison of 800. The bulk of the French army advanced across the Rhine but advanced slowly because of the difficulties of logistics in moving an army estimated at 100,000.

In the face of that advance, the smaller German Army of Observation retreated back across the River Weser into the territory of the Electorate of Hanover itself, and Cumberland tried to ready his troops. On July 2, the Prussian port of Emden fell to the French before a Royal Navy squadron sent to relieve it could reach there. That cut Hanover off from the Dutch Republic and so supplies from Britain could now be shipped directly only by sea. The French followed that up by seizing Cassel, which secured their right flank.

=== Battle of Hastenbeck ===
By late July, Cumberland believed his army to be ready for battle and adopted a defensive position around the village of Hastenbeck. The French won a narrow victory over him there, but as Cumberland retreated, his force began to disintegrate as morale collapsed. Despite his victory, d'Estrées was shortly afterwards replaced as commander of the French army by the Duc de Richelieu, who had recently distinguished himself leading the French forces that had captured Minorca. Richelieu's orders followed the original strategy of taking total control of Hanover and then turning west to offer assistance to the Austrians attacking Prussia.

=== Occupation of Hanover ===
Cumberland's forces continued to withdraw northwards. The French pursuit was slowed by further problems with supplies, but the French continued steadily to pursue the retreating Army of Observation. In an effort to cause a diversion and to provide some relief to Cumberland, the British planned an expedition to raid the French coastal town of Rochefort im the hope that the sudden threat would compel the French to withdraw troops from Germany to protect the French coast against further attacks. Under Richelieu, the French continued their drive by taking Minden and then capturing the city of Hanover on 11 August.

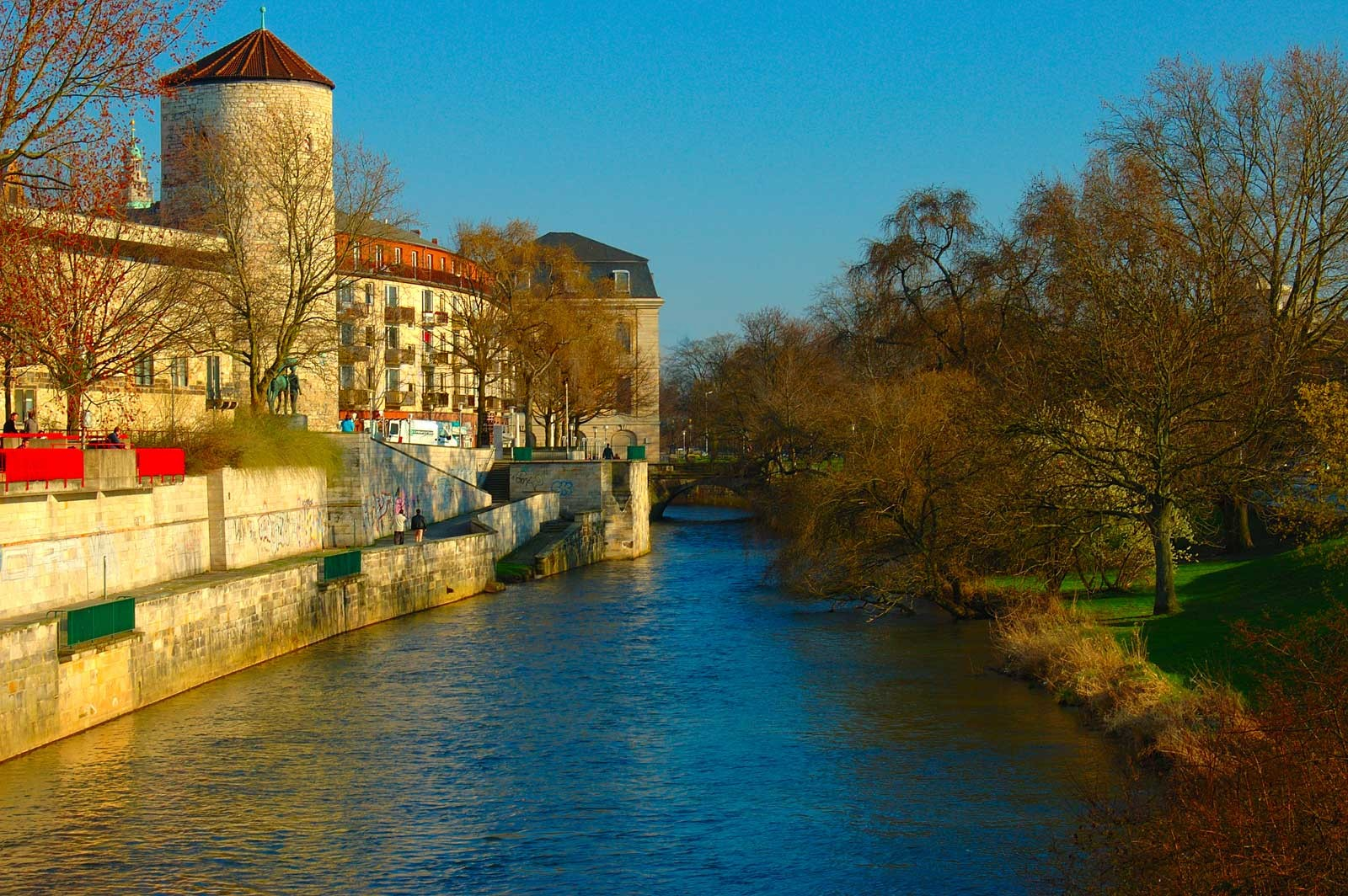
The city of Hanover, the capital of the Electorate, was occupied by French forces in August 1757.

Richelieu despatched a force to occupy Brunswick. Frederick the Great then decided to withdraw the Prussian contingent of Cumberland's army so that they could rejoin his own forces, which further weakened the Army of Observation.

The Hanoverian government retreated with Cumberland via Verden to Stade, Bremen-Verden's capital and a port town connected to the North Sea by the River Elbe. Although it was well-fortified and could be supplied from sea, Cumberland believed his situation to be precarious. The proposal that a large number of British reinforcements be diverted to Stade was rejected, and the British expedition was sent to its original destination of Rochefort although it was launched too late to do anything to provide a diversion in support of Cumberland. Orders were sent to Captain Hyde Parker to use his Royal Navy squadron to keep open the supply route down the Elbe to Cumberland until the onset of ice prevented him. The deployment of that squadron left Richelieu to believe that Cumberland's position in Stade was secure, as he could not be defeated through lack of food and supplies. Morale in the French army had now collapsed, and many troops had been immobilised by illness. Richelieu was now open to a negotiated settlement, a prospect that he had rejected on 21 August, when Cumberland had proposed an armistice.

=== Convention of Klosterzeven ===
Frederick V King of Denmark was obligated by treaty to send troops to defend the Duchies of Bremen and Verden, both ruled in personal union with Britain and Hanover, if they were threatened by a foreign power. As he was eager to preserve his country's neutrality, he attempted to broker an agreement between the two commanders. Richelieu, not believing that his army was in any condition to attack Klosterzeven, was receptive to the proposal, as was Cumberland, who was not optimistic about his own prospects.

On 10 September at Klosterzeven, the British and the French signed the Convention of Klosterzeven, which secured the immediate end of hostilities. The terms called for several conditions. The national contingents from Brunswick and Hesse would return to their homelands. Half of the Hanoverian force would be interned at Stade, and the remainder were to withdraw across the River Elbe. Most of Hanover would be under French occupation except for a demilitarised zone. The French would evacuate the Duchy of Bremen provided that the British withdrew their ships from the River Weser. However, a number of issues were left vague and poorly defined, which led to disputes and controversy. After the convention, the Army of Observation began to disperse though it was not required to surrender their weapons. However, some of the Hessians were forcibly disarmed by French troops in apparent violation of its terms.

The convention was immediately attacked in Britain, and despite having given Cumberland authorisation to negotiate terms, George II angrily rebuked his son on his return to London in October, which compelled Cumberland to resign all his military offices. Richelieu also faced strong criticism from Paris, where the terms were perceived as far too lenient. He had decided it was too late in the year to commit his forces now to a full attack on Prussia, which would have to wait until the following year. Instead, he moved his forces to take up winter quarters around Halberstadt although he had instructions to besiege the Prussian fortress of Magdeburg.

The British, seeing the terms agreed at Klosterzeven as contravening their own agreement with Prussia, announced that they were not bound by it. They also began to lobby George II and his Hanoverian ministers to abandon the convention and to reenter the war. On 8 October, George II revoked the agreement because of a technicality concerning the French interference with Hessian forces returning home. As the French had themselves been dissatisfied by the agreement, they also prepared to accept a return to hostilities.

Directed by the British, the Hanoverians began to reform the Army of Observation and selected Ferdinand of Brunswick, a Prussian commander and brother-in-law of Frederick the Great, as its new commander. The British now agreed to take over the payment of Hanoverian troops as well as other contingents. That marked a sudden reversal in the policies of William Pitt, who had opposed further British financial commitments to a continental war. However, he still insisted that no British troops would be sent to join Brunswick's army. Ultimately that never came to pass, as British troops reinforced the Allied army at further battles, notably Wilhelmstahl.

== Allied counterattack ==
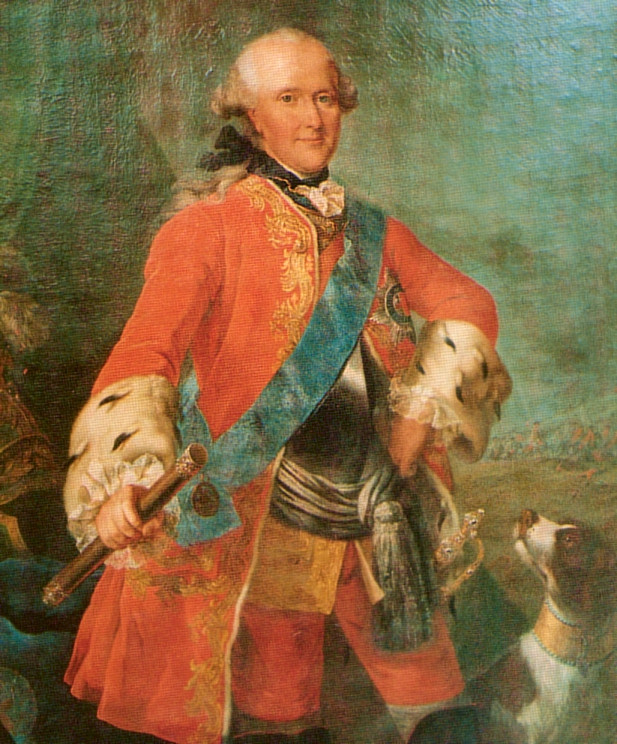
Ferdinand of Brunswick in late 1757 took command of the re-formed Army of Observation, pushed the French back across the Rhine and liberated Hanover.

Ferdinand immediately began reforms of the forces placed under his command and tried to instil a fresh spirit into the Hanoverians. He was helped by the fact that the French troops had committed various acts of brutality, which had turned the civilian population against the occupiers.

Following Frederick the Great's victory over the French at Rossbach, Ferdinand launched a winter campaign, an unusual strategy at the time, against the French occupiers. The condition of the French forces had deteriorated by then, and Richelieu began to withdraw, rather than face a major battle. Shortly afterwards, he resigned his post and was replaced by Louis, Count of Clermont, who wrote to Louis XV describing the poor conditions of his army and claiming that it was made up of looters and casualties. Richelieu was accused of various misdemeanours., including stealing the pay of his own soldiers.

Ferdinand's counterattack saw the Allied forces recapture the port of Emden and drive the French back across the River Rhine so that by the spring Hanover had been liberated. The French had been seemingly close to their goal of total victory in Europe but by late 1757 and early 1758, a shift had been revealed in the overall fortunes of the war, as Britain and its allies began to have more success around the globe.

== Aftermath ==
Despite the setback in 1758, it was still a central part of French strategy to recapture Hanover and to use it as a bargaining counter for lost French territories. That particularly became the case following the fall of Quebec in 1759. The French committed increasingly large forces in their attempt to defeat Ferdinand's army and occupy Hanover, but despite repeated efforts, they were unable to break through and capture it again. Following the defeat of the final French attempt at the Battle of Wilhelmsthal in 1762, an armistice was agreed and the later Treaty of Paris compelled France to evacuate all of its forces from Germany and the Austrian Netherlands.

In the later American War of Independence France signed a neutrality convention with Hanover, ruling out a French attack on Hanoverian soil. That was a recognition by the French leadership that it had been a mistake to attack Hanover in 1757 and pour so many troops and resources into the attempt to retake it while British forces had been free to attack French colonies in the West Indies, Canada, Africa and India.

== Bibliography ==
- Anderson, Fred. Crucible of War: The Seven Years' War and the Fate of Empire in British North America, 1754–1766. Faber and Faber, 2001
- Corbett, Julian Stafford. England in the Seven Years' War: A study in Combined Operations. Volume I. London, 1907.
- Dull, Jonathan R. The French Navy and the Seven Years' War. University of Nebraska, 2005.
- Mayo, Lawrence Shaw. Jeffrey Amherst: A Biography. Longmans Green, 1916.
- McLynn, Frank. 1759: The Year Britain Became Master of the World. Pimlico, 2005.
- Middleton, Richard. The Bells of Victory: The Pitt-Newcastle Ministry and the Conduct of the Seven Years' War, 1757–1762. Cambridge University Press, 1985.
- Simms, Brendan. Three Victories and a Defeat: The Rise and Fall of the First British Empire. Penguin Books, 2008.
