= Siege of Geldern =

1757 confrontation between France and Prussia militaries

- Part of European theater of the Seven Years' War
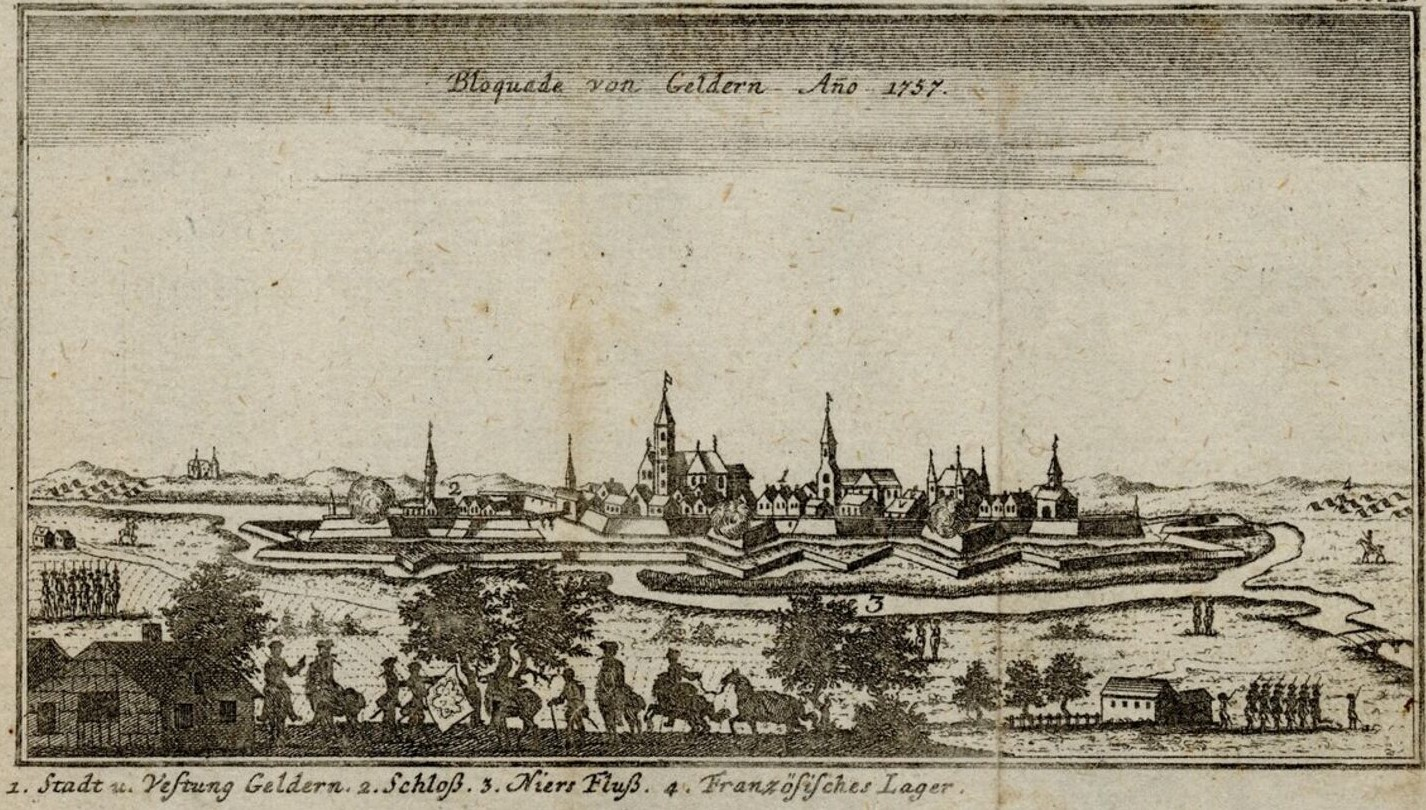
- Siege of Geldern, 1757 copper-plate engraving
Date	14 April – 23 August 1757
Location	Geldern, Prussian Guelders, Kingdom of Prussia
Result	French victory

Belligerents
France	Prussia

Commanders and leaders
Duc d'Estrées; Comte de Beausobre	Friedrich von Salmuth

Strength
Thousands	800

Casualties and losses
Unknown	Unknown

The siege of Geldern was one of the first military confrontations between France and Prussia during the Seven Years' War. Surrounded by an advancing French army, the Prussian garrison of Geldern surrendered after a four-month siege.

== Background ==
In the wake of the Diplomatic Revolution of 1756 and the subsequent First Treaty of Versailles, France agreed to a defensive pact with its new ally, Austria, if either were attacked by Great Britain or Prussia.

On 29 August 1756, Prussia launched a pre-emptive invasion of the Austrian ally of Saxony, starting the Third Silesian War, and therefore drawing France into the new conflict.

The invasion led to the signing of the Second Treaty of Versailles between Austria and France on 1 May 1757. In the treaty, France promised to strengthen its commitment to their existing alliance by raising an army in Flanders to invade Prussia from the west. However, France had already been assembling troops in Flanders as early as March to invade the British ally of Hanover.

With the French invasion of Hanover looming, Frederick II of Prussia ordered for the Prussian fortress of Wesel to be evacuated in early 1757, and its garrison sent to join the assembling Hanoverian Army of Observation, leaving the garrison of Geldern on the western extremity of the Kingdom of Prussia isolated.

The garrison of Geldern exchanged fire with French hussars on 25 March, and would later fall under a full siege when the French surrounded the town on 14 April.

== Siege ==
The Prussians attempted to flood the approaches to the fortifications, but were only partly successful. During the siege, part of the mostly-foreign Prussian garrison mutinied, although this was swiftly dealt with by von Salmuth. The garrison finally surrendered on 23 August and, in recognition of its stubborn defence, was allowed by Beausobre to withdraw to the Prussian stronghold of Magdeburg unmolested.

== Aftermath ==
Although the siege had delayed part of the French army for several months, its conclusion allowed them to rejoin the rest of French army in the invasion of Hanover. By the time the Prussians reached Magdeburg on 4 October, almost all of the original Geldern garrison had deserted along the way.

== Sources ==
- Anderson, Fred (2000). Crucible of War: The Seven Years' War and the Fate of Empire in British North America, 1754–1766. Faber and Faber.
- Archenholz, J. W. (1843). The History of the Seven Years War in Germany.
- Ersch, Johann Samuel (1822). Allgemeine Enzyklopaedie der Wissenschaften und Kuenste. J. F. Gleditsch. Siege of Geldern at the Internet Archive (page 268)
- Reid, Stuart (2010). Frederick the Great's Allies 1756-63. Osprey Publishing.
