= Jean-Jacques de Beausobre =

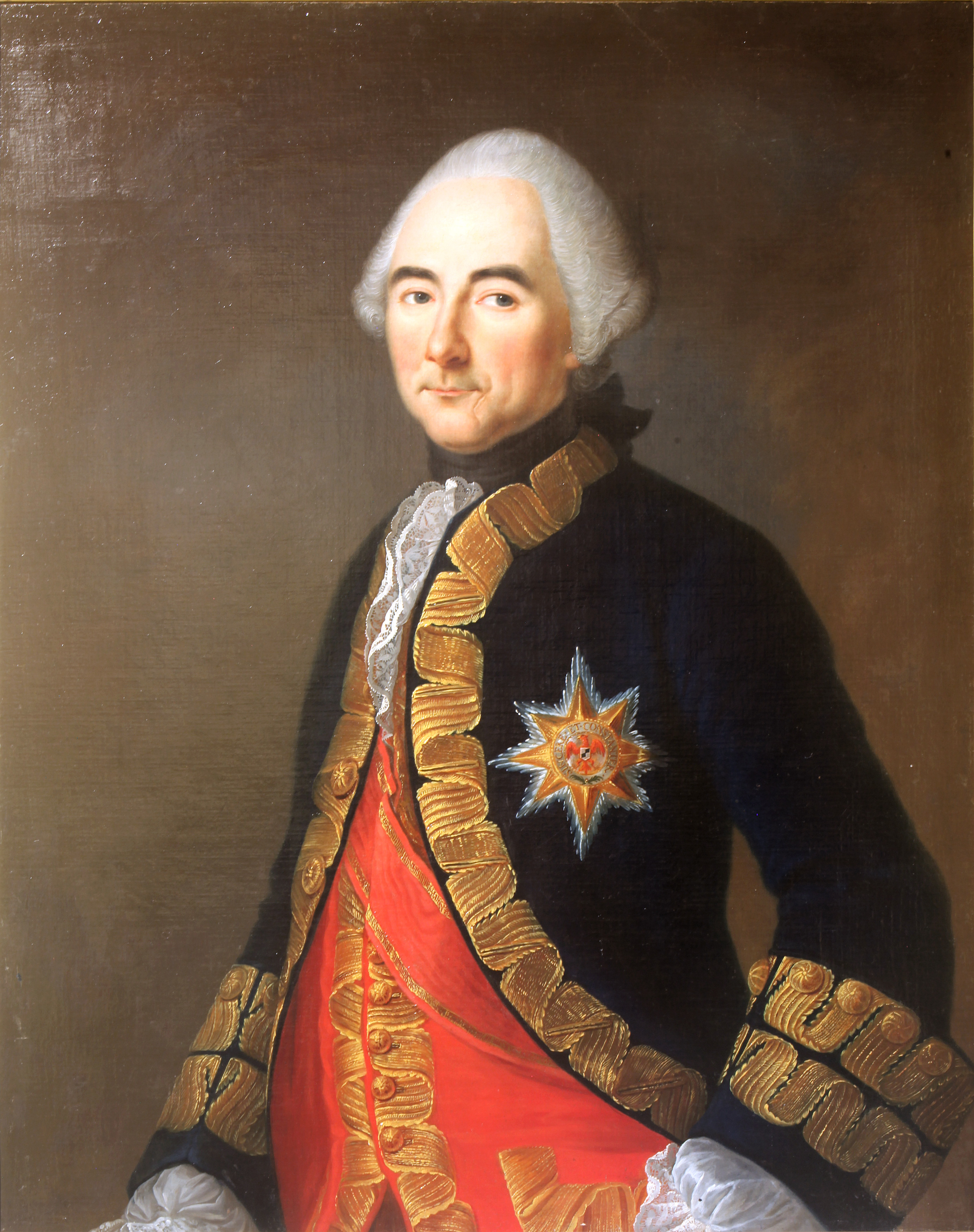
Portrait of Beausobre in Morges Castle

Jean-Jacques de Beausobre (Niort, 15 March 1704 – Bisseuil, 8 October 1783) was a Swiss military officer in French service.

== Life ==
Originally from Morges, Beausobre was the son of Jeanne and Jean de Beausobre, a colonel in the French Régiment de Courten. He entered his father's regiment as a cadet 1716. Beausobre served with distinction in the War of the Polish Succession, the War of the Austrian Succession and the Seven Years' War. Beausobre led the Siege of Geldern in 1757, during the Seven Years' War, and was appointed governor of Guelders until 1761. He reached the rank of lieutenant-general in 1759.

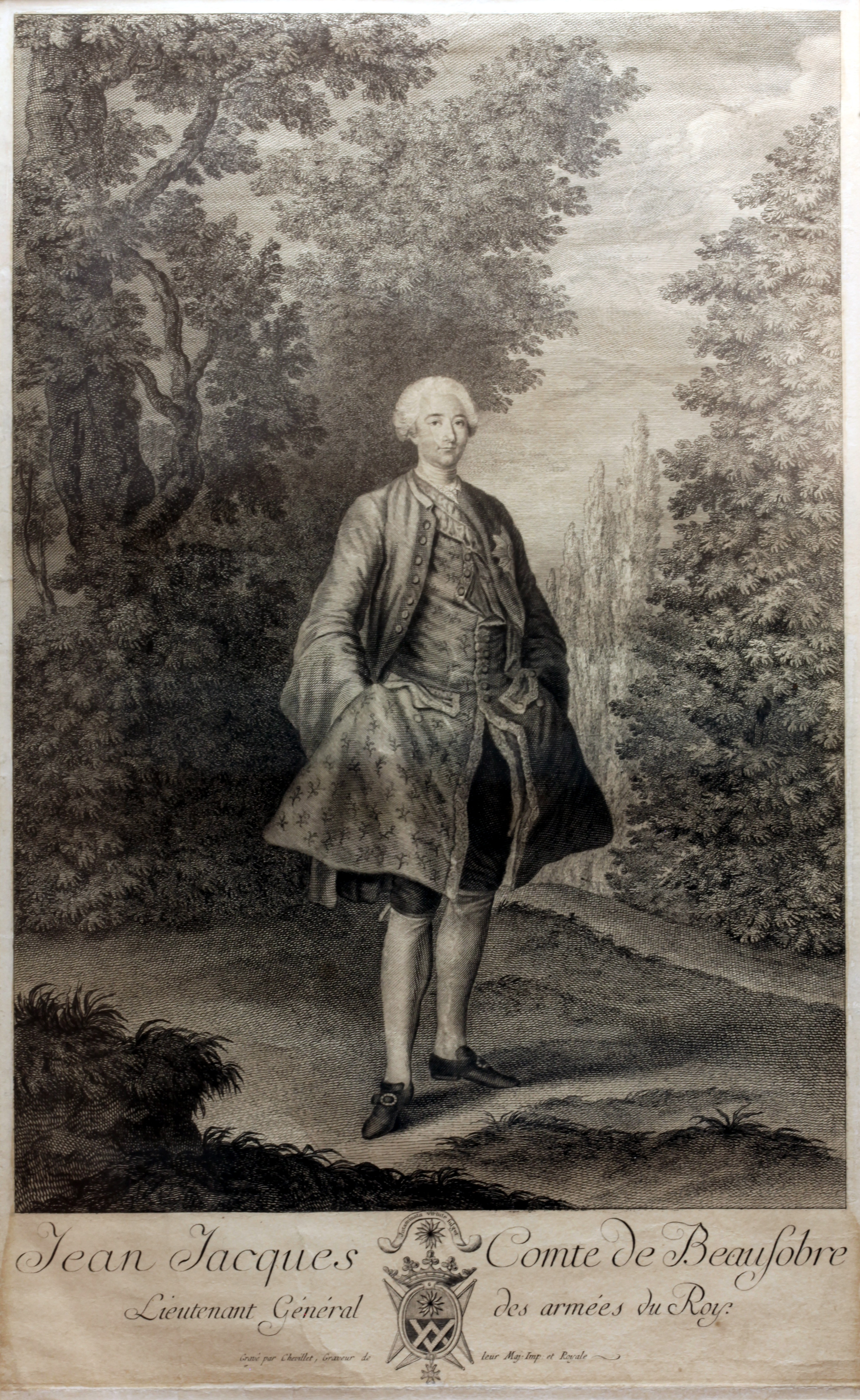
Beausobre engraved by Juste Chevillet

In 1743, Beausobre founded his own hussard regiment. He was made a marquis by King Louis XV in 1740.
