= Louis Charles César Le Tellier, Duke of Estrées =

French military commander and Marshal of France

Louis Tellier
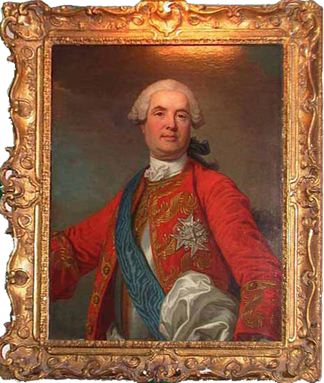
- Born: 2 July 1695
- Died: 2 January 1771 (aged 75); Paris, France
- Military career
- Allegiance: France
- Service years: 1745–1759
- Conflicts: War of the Quadruple Alliance Siege of San Sebastián (1719) War of the Polish Succession Siege of Kehl (1733) Siege of Philippsburg (1734). War of the Austrian Succession Battle of Fontenoy Siege of Mons (1746) Seven Years' War Siege of Geldern Battle of Hastenbeck

Coat of arms of Louis Charles César Le Tellier

Louis Charles César Le Tellier, Duke of Estrées (2 July 1695 – 2 January 1771) was a French military commander and Marshal of France.

== Biography ==
His father was Michel François Le Tellier (1663–1721), marquis de Courtenvaux, himself son of Louis XIV's War Minister François Michel Le Tellier, Marquis de Louvois. His mother was Marie Anne d'Estrées (d. 1741), daughter of Marshal Jean II d'Estrées and younger sister of Marshal Victor Marie d'Estrées.

He married twice, to Anne Catherine de Champagne La Suze, and to Adélaïde Félicité de Brûlart, but had no children from these marriages.

He obtained command of a company in 1717, became a lieutenant colonel of the Royal-Roussillon regiment, and served in the War of the Quadruple Alliance against Spain at the sieges of Fuenterrabía, San Sebastián, Urgell, and Rosas. After the war, he held the position of captain-colonel of the Cent-Suisses of the King's Guard from 1722 to 1734.
During the War of the Polish Succession, he fought in Germany and participated in the Siege of Kehl (1733) and Siege of Philippsburg (1734).

At the outbreak of the War of the Austrian Succession, he fought in Bohemia and Bavaria. He was inspector general of the cavalry in 1743 and as lieutenant general, he distinguished himself in the Battle of Fontenoy. He continued to serve in Flanders and contributed to the victory at the battles of Rocoux, Lauffeld and the capture of Maastricht.

A Marshal of France since 24 February 1757, he was commander of the armies in Westphalia during the Seven Years' War. On 26 July 1757, he won the Battle of Hastenbeck against Hanoverian and Hessian troops under the Duke of Cumberland during the Invasion of Hanover but was replaced as French commander shortly afterwards. He became Minister of State on 2 July 1758.

In 1759, following the French defeat at the Battle of Minden, he was ordered to conduct a tour of inspection of French forces in Germany.

He became a knight in the Order of the Holy Spirit in 1746 and received the title of Duc d'Estrées in 1763 from his mother's family.

He was a Freemason from 1736.
