= Prince William, Duke of Cumberland =

British prince (1721–1765)

Prince William
- Duke of Cumberland (more)
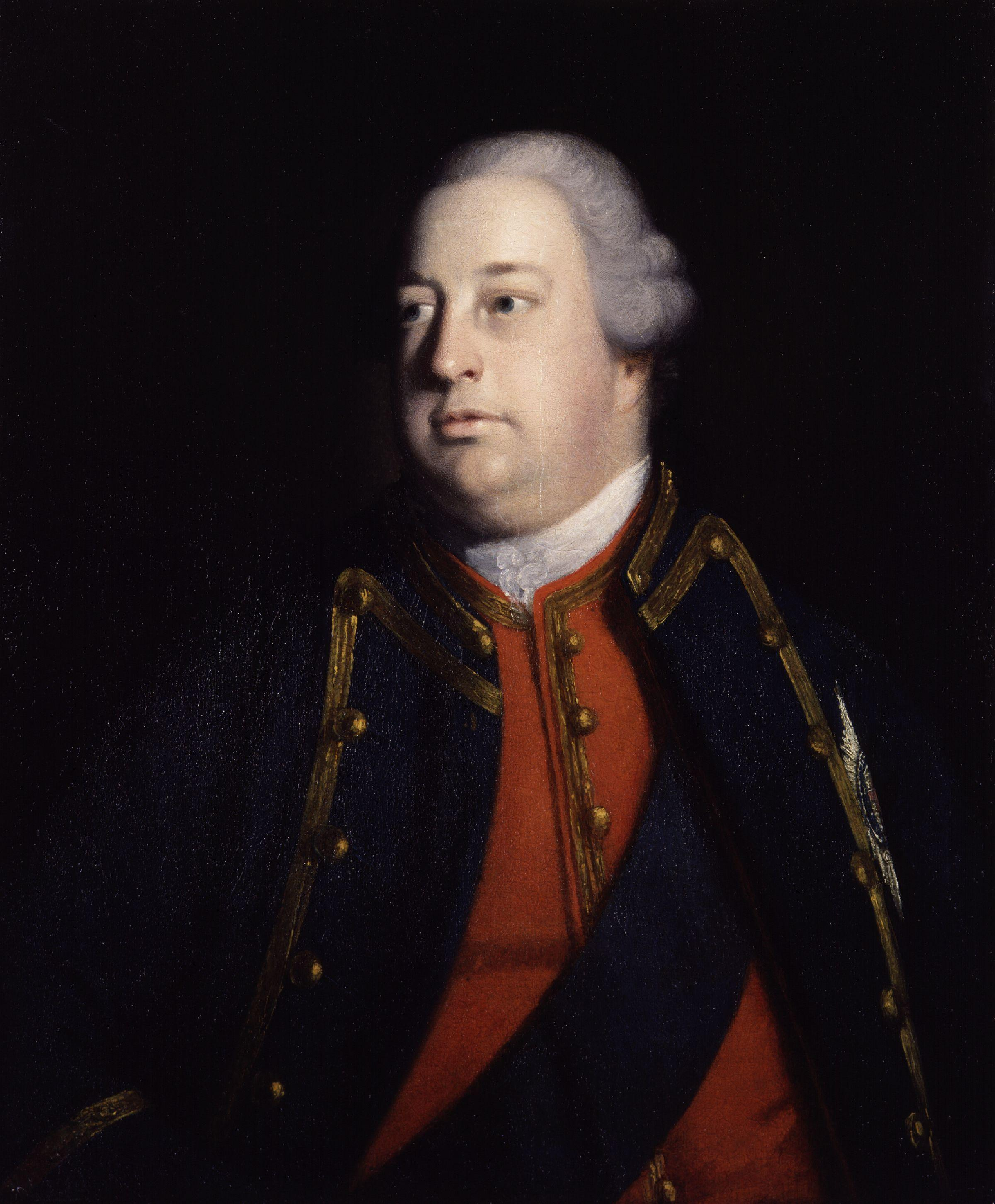
- Portrait by Sir Joshua Reynolds, c. 1759
- Born: 15 April 1721 (New Style); Leicester House, London, England
- Died: 31 October 1765 (aged 44); Mayfair, London, England
- Burial: 10 November 1765; Westminster Abbey, London
Names
- William Augustus
- House: Hanover
- Father: George II of Great Britain
- Mother: Caroline of Ansbach
- Military career
- Allegiance: Great Britain (1740–1757) (Province of Hanover) Hanover (1757)
- Branch: Royal Navy; British Army
- Service years: 1740–1757
- Rank: General
- Nicknames: The Butcher; Sweet William
- Unit: Grenadier Guards
- Commands: Pragmatic Army; Government Army; Hanoverian Army of Observation; Commander-in-Chief of the Forces
- Conflicts: War of the Austrian Succession; Battle of Dettingen; Battle of Fontenoy; Battle of Lauffeld; Jacobite rising of 1745; Clifton Moor Skirmish; Siege of Carlisle; Siege of Stirling Castle; Battle of Culloden; Raids on Lochaber and Shiramore; Seven Years' War; Battle of Hastenbeck

Prince William Augustus, Duke of Cumberland (15 April 1721 [N.S.] – 31 October 1765), was the third and youngest son of George II of Great Britain and Ireland and his wife, Caroline of Ansbach. He was Duke of Cumberland from 1726. He is best remembered for his role in putting down the Jacobite Rising at the Battle of Culloden in 1746, which made him popular in certain parts of Britain. He is often referred to by the nickname given to him by his Tory opponents: 'Butcher' Cumberland.

For much of the War of the Austrian Succession, with the assistance of John Ligonier, Cumberland commanded the main allied field army in Flanders acting in defence of the Austrian Netherlands and the Dutch Republic. At the head of the largest deployment of British troops on the continent since the days of Marlborough and opposed to the experienced French Marshal Maurice de Saxe, Cumberland's campaigning could not prevent the fall of the Dutch Barrier Forts. Between 1748 and 1755 he attempted to enact a series of army reforms that were resisted by the opposition and by the army itself. Following the Convention of Klosterzeven in 1757, he never again held active military command and switched his attentions to politics and horse racing.

== Early life ==
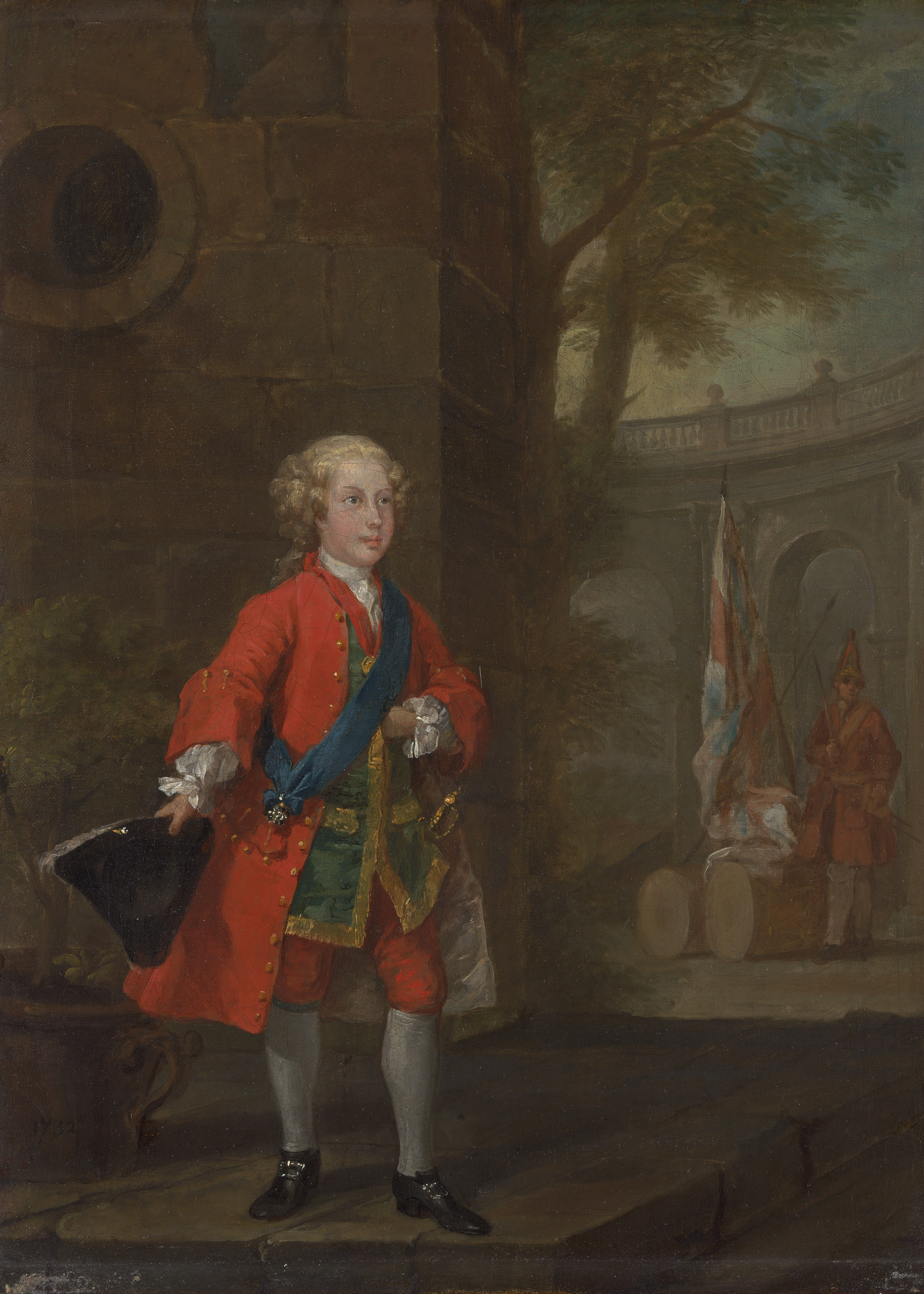
William Augustus, aged 10 or 11, painted by William Hogarth

William was born in Leicester House, in Leicester Fields (now Leicester Square), Westminster, London, where his parents had moved after his grandfather, George I, accepted the invitation to ascend the British throne. On 27 July 1726, at only five years old, he was created Duke of Cumberland, Marquess of Berkhamstead in the County of Hertford, Earl of Kennington in the County of Surrey, Viscount of Trematon in the County of Cornwall, and Baron of the Isle of Alderney.

The young prince was educated well; his mother appointed Edmond Halley as a tutor. Another of his tutors (and occasional proxy for him) was his mother's favourite Andrew Fountaine. At Hampton Court Palace, apartments were designed specially for him by William Kent.

William's elder brother Frederick, Prince of Wales, proposed dividing the King's dominions. Frederick would get Britain, while William would get Hanover. This proposal came to nothing.

== Early military career ==
From childhood, he showed physical courage and ability, and became his parents' favourite. He was enrolled in the 2nd Foot Guards and made a Knight of the Bath, when aged four. He was intended, by the King and Queen, for the office of Lord High Admiral, and, in 1740, he sailed, as a volunteer, in the fleet under the command of Sir John Norris, but he quickly became dissatisfied with the Navy, and, instead secured the post of colonel of the First Regiment of Foot Guards on 20 February 1741.

== War of the Austrian Succession ==
In December 1742, he became a major-general, and, the following year, he first saw active service in Germany. George II and the "martial boy" shared in the glory of the Battle of Dettingen (27 June 1743), where Cumberland was wounded in his right leg by a musket ball. After the battle he was made a lieutenant general.

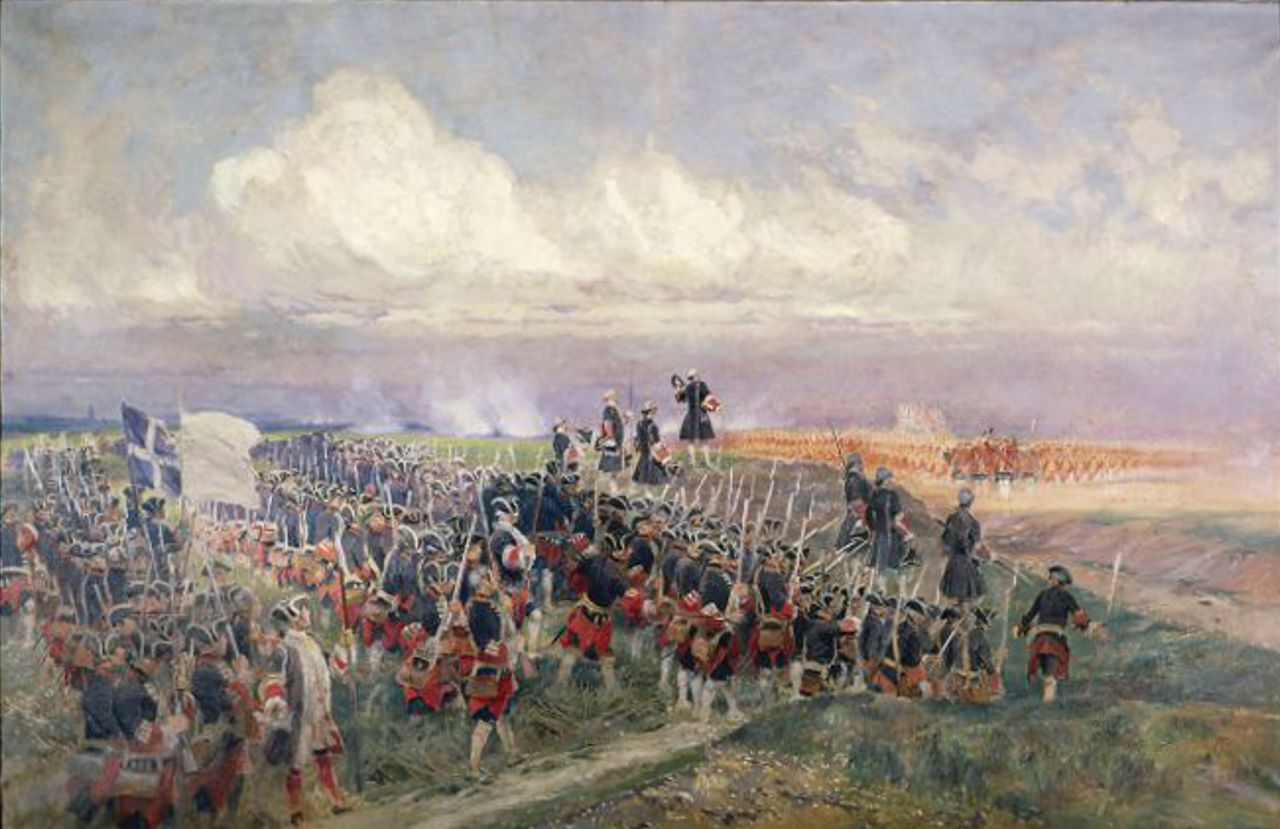
The Battle of Fontenoy in 1745 was Cumberland's first battle as commander.

In 1745, Cumberland was given the honorary title of Captain-General of the British land forces and in Flanders became Commander-in-Chief of the allied British, Hanoverian, Austrian and Dutch (known as the Pragmatic Army) troops despite his inexperience. He initially planned to take the offensive against the French, in a move he hoped would lead to the capture of Paris, but was persuaded by his advisors that this was impossible given the vast numerical superiority of the enemy.

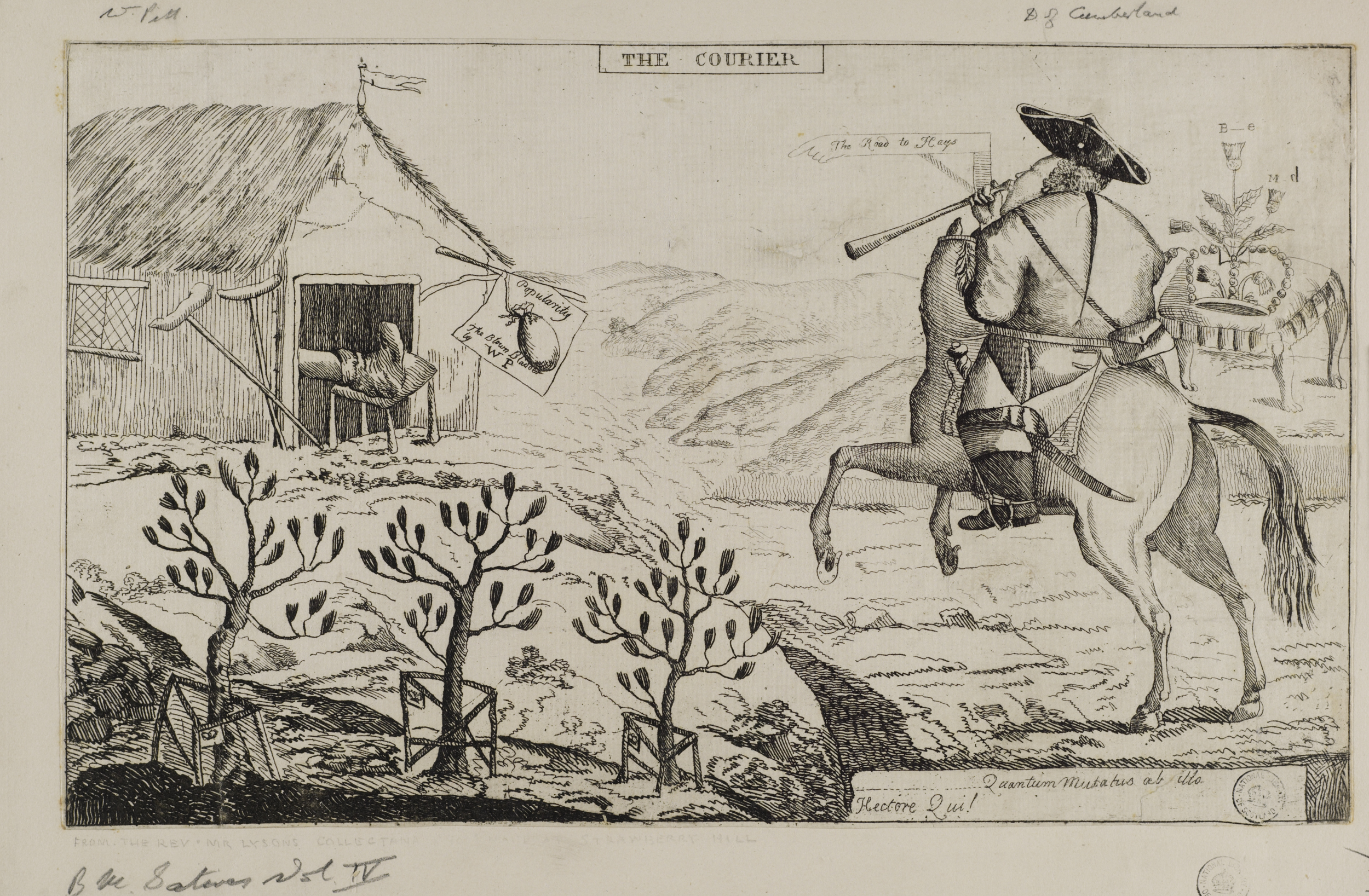
Jacobite satire of the Duke of Cumberland in the Highlands

As it became clear that the French intention was to take Tournai, Cumberland advanced to the relief of the town, which was besieged by Marshal Maurice de Saxe. In the resulting Battle of Fontenoy on 11 May 1745, the Allies were defeated by the French. Saxe had picked the battleground on which to confront the British, and filled the nearby woods with French marksmen. Cumberland ignored the threat of the woods when drawing up his battle plans, and instead concentrated on seizing the village of Fontenoy and attacking the main French army nearby.

Despite a concerted Anglo-Hanoverian attack on the French centre, which led many to believe the Allies had won, the failure to clear the woods and of the Dutch forces to capture Fontenoy forced Cumberland to retreat to Brussels, where he was unable to prevent the fall of Ghent, Bruges and Ostend. Cumberland was frequently criticised for his tactics in the battle, particularly his failure to occupy the woods.

== Jacobite rebellion – "The Forty-Five" ==
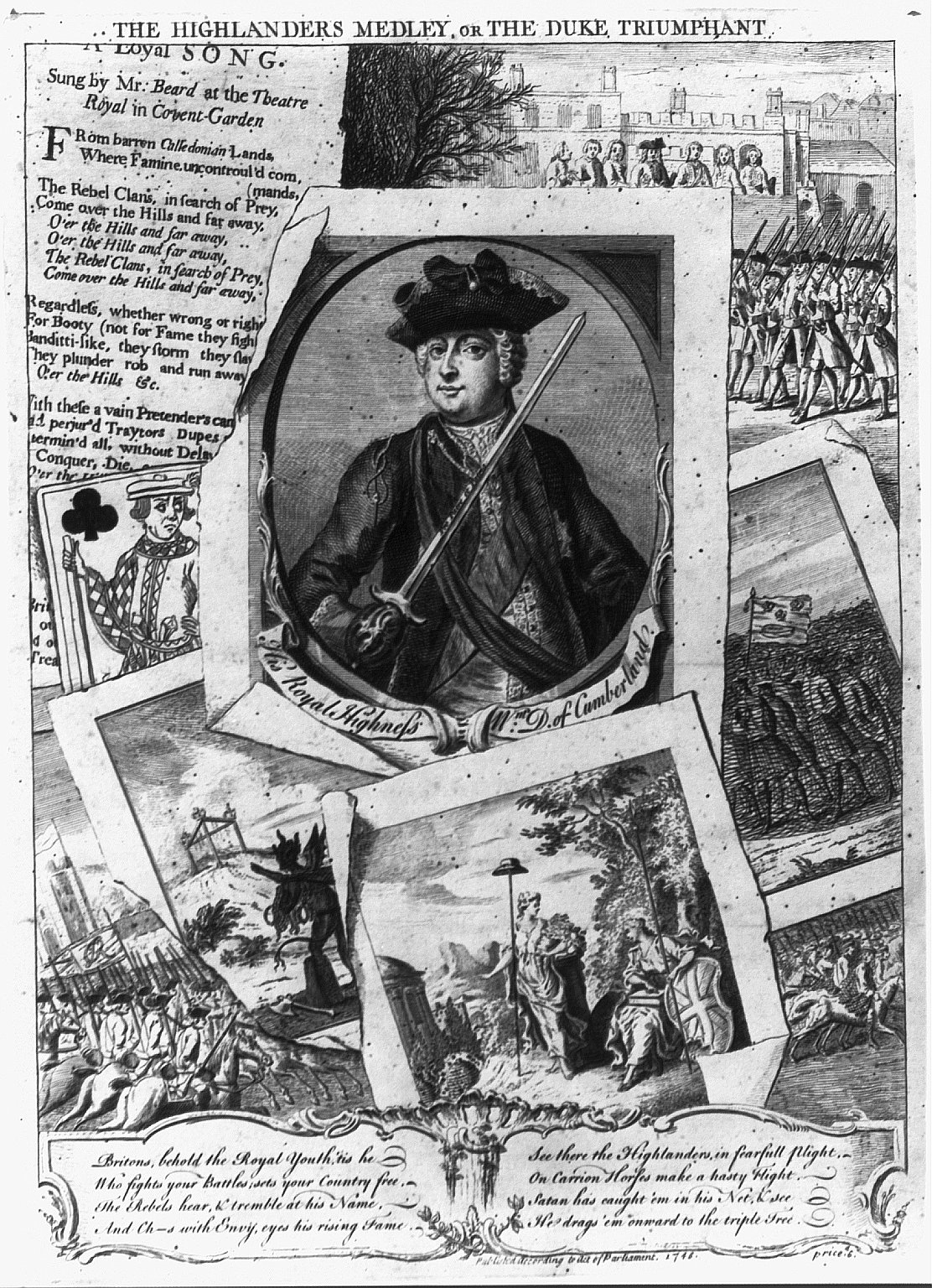
"The Highlanders Medley", or "The Duke Triumphant"

As the leading British general of the day, he was chosen to put a decisive stop to Prince Charles Edward Stuart, a grandson of James VII of Scotland and II of England (James VII/II was the last Stuart king on the male line), in the Jacobite rising of 1745. His appointment was popular, and caused morale to soar amongst the public and troops loyal to King George.

Recalled from Flanders, Cumberland proceeded with preparations for quelling the Stuart (Jacobite) uprising. The Jacobite army had advanced southwards into England, hoping that English Jacobites would rise and join them. However, after receiving only limited support, such as the Manchester Regiment, the followers of Charles decided to withdraw to Scotland.

Cumberland joined the Midland army under Ligonier, and began pursuit of the enemy, as the Stuarts retreated northwards from Derby. On reaching Penrith, the advanced portion of his army was repulsed on Clifton Moor in December 1745, and Cumberland became aware that an attempt to overtake the retreating Highlanders would be hopeless. Carlisle was retaken, and he was recalled to London, where preparations were in hand to meet an expected French invasion. The defeat of his replacement as commander, Henry Hawley, caused great panic in England in January 1746, when, under a hail of pistol fire, "eighty dragoons fell dead upon the spot" at Falkirk Muir.

=== Culloden ===
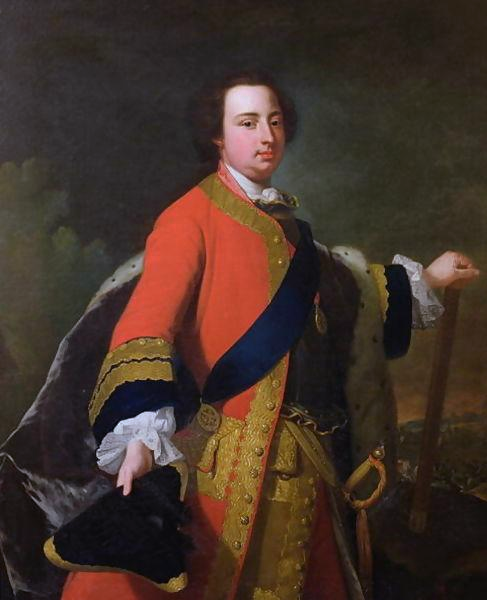
Prince William, Duke of Cumberland, by Arthur Pond, c. 1730-40

Arriving in Edinburgh on 30 January 1746, Cumberland assumed command of his forces and marched them to Aberdeen. There, he ordered them to undergo training for approximately two months in preparation for engaging the Jacobite army. On 8 April, he set out from Aberdeen with his troops for Inverness; eight days later on 16 April, he engaged the main Jacobite army near the village of Culloden. In the ensuing battle, his army decisively defeated the Jacobites. The battle lasted only an hour, with the Jacobites suffering between 1,500 and 2,000 casualties, while approximately 300 government soldiers were killed or wounded.

On the morning after the battle, Cumberland issued a written order reminding his men that "the public orders of the rebels yesterday was to give us no quarter" and ordering his men to treat Jacobite wounded in the same manner. Cumberland alluded to the belief that such orders had been found upon the bodies of fallen Jacobites. However, for the two days after the battle, Cumberland's order was not followed upon; though in the following two days, government troops scoured the battlefield and put to death many wounded Jacobite soldiers they came across.

Government forces subsequently embarked upon the pacification of Jacobite regions in the Scottish Highlands, which took several months. They carried out searches for rebels across the Highlands, confiscating property, destroying nonjuring Episcopalian and Catholic meeting houses and summarily executing numerous suspected rebels. While he had been in Inverness, Cumberland emptied the city jails of all of those who had been imprisoned by Jacobites and replaced them with Jacobites themselves; after the battle at Culloden, Jacobite prisoners were taken south to England to stand trial for high treason.

=== "Butcher Cumberland" ===
Following Culloden, Cumberland was nicknamed "Sweet William" by his Whig supporters and "The Butcher" by his Tory opponents the latter being a taunt first recorded in the City of London and used for political purposes in England. Cumberland's own brother, the Prince of Wales (who had been refused permission to take a military role on his father's behalf), seems to have encouraged the virulent attacks upon the Duke. Cumberland preserved the strictest discipline in his camp. He was inflexible in the execution of what he deemed to be his duty, without favour to any man. In only a few cases he exercised his influence in favour of clemency. (Note: One of these is described in Walter Scott's 1829 introduction to Waverley (1805): "At length Colonel Whitefoord applied to the Duke of Cumberland in person [for a pardon for Alexander Stewart of Invernahyle, who had spared Whitefoord's life at the Battle of Prestonpans in 1745]. From him, also, he received a positive refusal. He then limited his request, for the present, to a protection for Stewart's house, wife, children, and property. This was also refused by the Duke; on which Colonel Whitefoord, taking his commission from his bosom, laid it on the table before his Royal Highness with much emotion, and asked permission to retire from the service of a sovereign who did not know how to spare a vanquished enemy. The Duke was struck, and even affected. He bade the Colonel take up his commission, and granted the protection he required.") The Duke's victorious efforts were acknowledged by his being voted an income of £25,000 per annum over and above his money from the civil list. A thanksgiving service was held at St Paul's Cathedral, that included the first performance of Handel's oratorio Judas Maccabaeus, composed especially for Cumberland, which contains the anthem "See the Conquering Hero Comes".

=== Return to the Continent ===
The Duke took no part in the Flanders campaign of 1746, during which the French made huge advances capturing Brussels and defeating the Allies at Rocoux. In 1747, Cumberland returned to Continental Europe. He again opposed the still-victorious Marshal Saxe and received a heavy defeat at the Battle of Lauffeld, or Val, near Maastricht, on 2 July 1747. This and the fall of Bergen-op-Zoom compelled the two sides to the negotiating table and in 1748 the Peace of Aix-la-Chapelle was concluded and Cumberland returned home.

== Peacetime ==
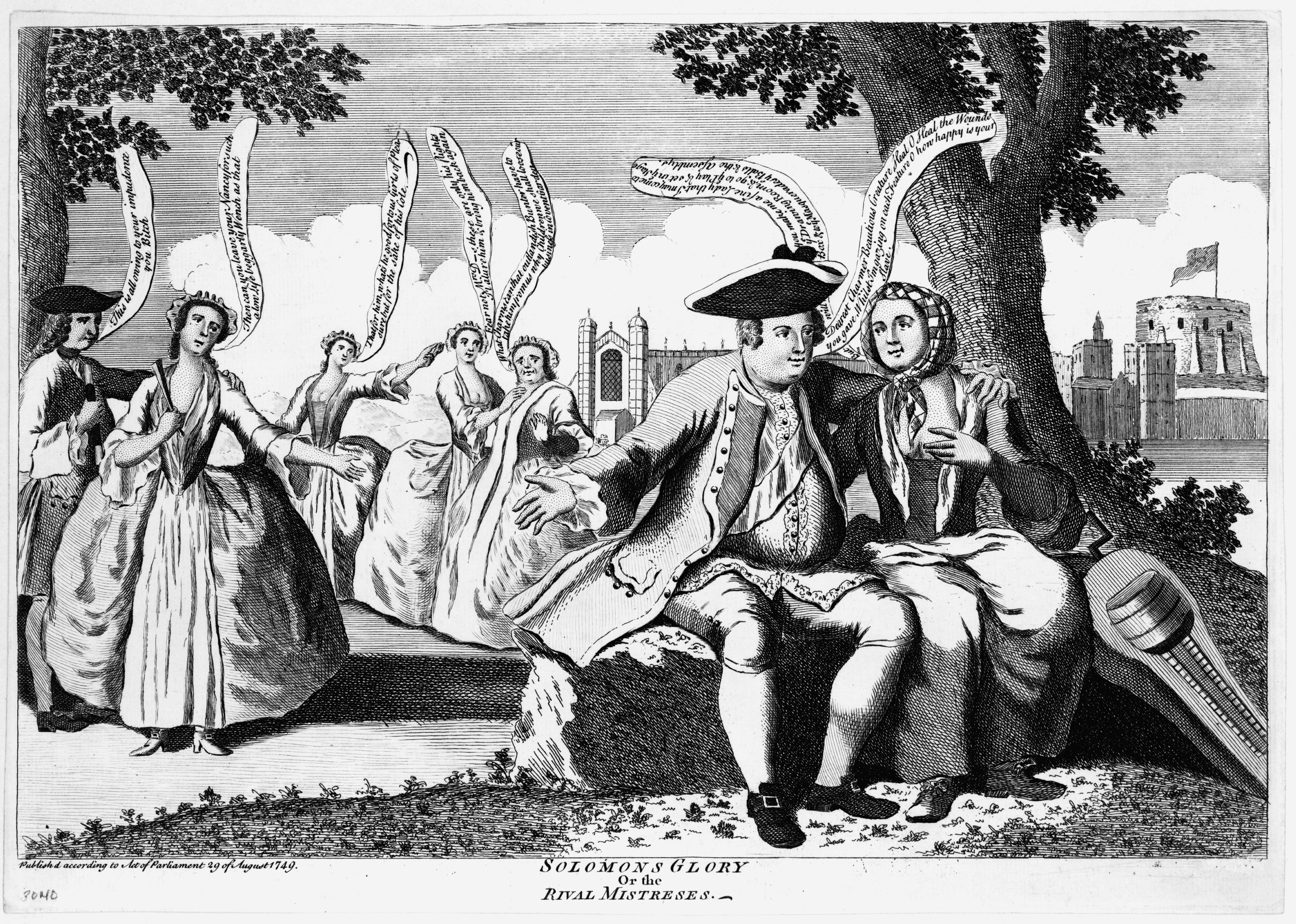
"Solomon's Glory, or Rival Mistresses", 1749

Cumberland's unpopularity, which had steadily increased since Culloden, interfered greatly with his success in politics, and when the death of the Prince of Wales brought the latter's son, a minor, next in succession to the throne, the Duke was not able to secure for himself the contingent regency. As a compromise, the regency was vested in the Dowager Princess of Wales, who considered him an enemy, but her powers were curtailed and she was to be advised by a committee of twelve men, headed by Cumberland.

=== Attempts at army reform ===
Whilst in the office of Commander-in-Chief, Cumberland attempted to reform the peacetime army with the support of his father. He wished to wrest control over promotions from the government to the army itself and to limit or curtail the practice of purchase. Cumberland further wished to create a special standing force which could be quickly deployed overseas in time of crisis. The Whigs, who only tolerated the army's existence in peacetime and had confidence only in the commanders' control over the militia, saw the expansion and further professionalisation of the army as absolutist. Critics such as Horace Walpole argued the institution of purchase was one of the safeguards of parliamentary sovereignty against Royalist insurrection. Cumberland's opponent in government Charles Townshend wished to instead further reduce the peacetime army and reform the militia by creating a volunteer force for home defence, a precursor to the volunteers of the 19th century which would be under the direct control of civil authorities.

== Seven Years' War ==
=== North America ===
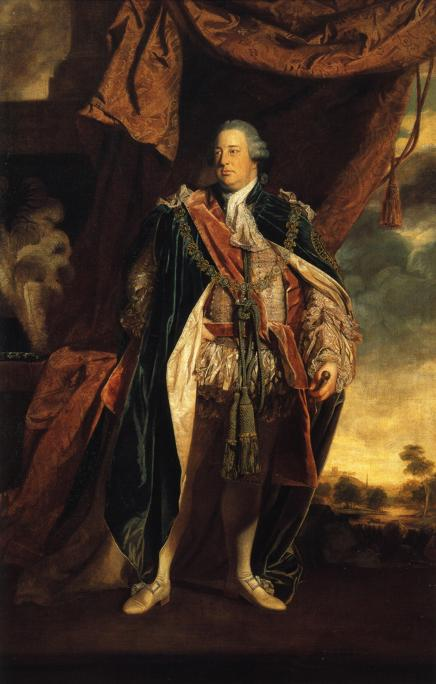
Portrait of the Duke of Cumberland in the robes of the Order of the Garter by Sir Joshua Reynolds, 1758

In 1754, the simmering colonial rivalry between Britain and France over competing territorial claims in North America developed into war. France asserted its claim to the Ohio Valley by building a network of powerful fortifications. The government ministry led by Thomas Pelham-Holles, 1st Duke of Newcastle initially proposed a limited military response, in which a Highland regiment supported by colonial forces would drive the French from the Ohio Valley. Cumberland believed the plan was not decisive enough to protect British interests in North America and expanded the plan to include a four-pronged assault against New France, with forces striking simultaneously at Fort Duquesne, Fort Saint-Frédéric, Fort Niagara, and Fort Beauséjour.

Cumberland proposed that only overwhelming force would defeat France in America, which was contradictory to Newcastle's own proposals and previous government strategies which advocated limited offensive operations. Further, Cumberland proposed a role of commander-in-chief for forces in America, who would have the power to levy local troops and direct local strategy. A 3,500 strong mixed force of regulars, militia, and allied natives would be assembled. It would then cross the Virginia mountains and strike Duquesne. Two regiments drawn from Ireland were given this task. An officer who had impressed Cumberland on previous campaigns, Edward Braddock, was given command of all crown forces in America, to the surprise of many in the army as Braddock was relatively unknown.

Newcastle approved the bolder plan, which met with limited success. In his role as army Commander-in-Chief, Cumberland advised on the conduct of the war in North America. He believed the war should be principally conducted by the colonies themselves and that regular troops should only play a supporting role. He was influential in the appointment of John Campbell, 4th Earl of Loudoun, another favourite and an officer who had served in Cumberland's army during the Jacobite rebellion. Cumberland advised Loudoun to expose his officers and soldiers to scouting expeditions, so that they might "learn to beat the woods". Cumberland approved the plan to develop light infantry in the British Army.

=== Invasion of Hanover ===
In 1757, the war having spread to Continental Europe, Cumberland was placed at the head of the Hanoverian Army of Observation, intended to defend Hanover (of which George II was Elector) from a French invasion. At the Battle of Hastenbeck, near Hamelin, on 26 July 1757, Cumberland's army was defeated by the superior forces of Louis Charles d'Estrées. Despite seemingly having the advantage towards the end of the battle, Cumberland's forces began to retreat. Within a short time discipline had collapsed, and Cumberland's army headed northwards in total disorder. Cumberland hoped that the Royal Navy might bring him reinforcements and supplies which would allow him to regroup and counterattack, but the British mounted an expedition to Rochefort instead, despite suggestions that it should be sent to aid Cumberland.

By September 1757 Cumberland and his forces had retreated to the fortified town of Stade on the North Sea coast. George II gave him discretionary powers to negotiate a separate peace. Hemmed in by French forces led by the Duc de Richelieu, Cumberland agreed to the Convention of Klosterzeven, under which his army was to be disbanded and much of Hanover occupied by French forces, at the Zeven Convent on 8 September 1757.

On Cumberland's return to London, he was treated badly by his father, despite the fact that he had previously been given permission to negotiate such an agreement. When they met, George II remarked "Here is my son who has ruined me and disgraced himself". In response, Cumberland resigned all the military and public offices he held and retired into private life.

== Final years ==
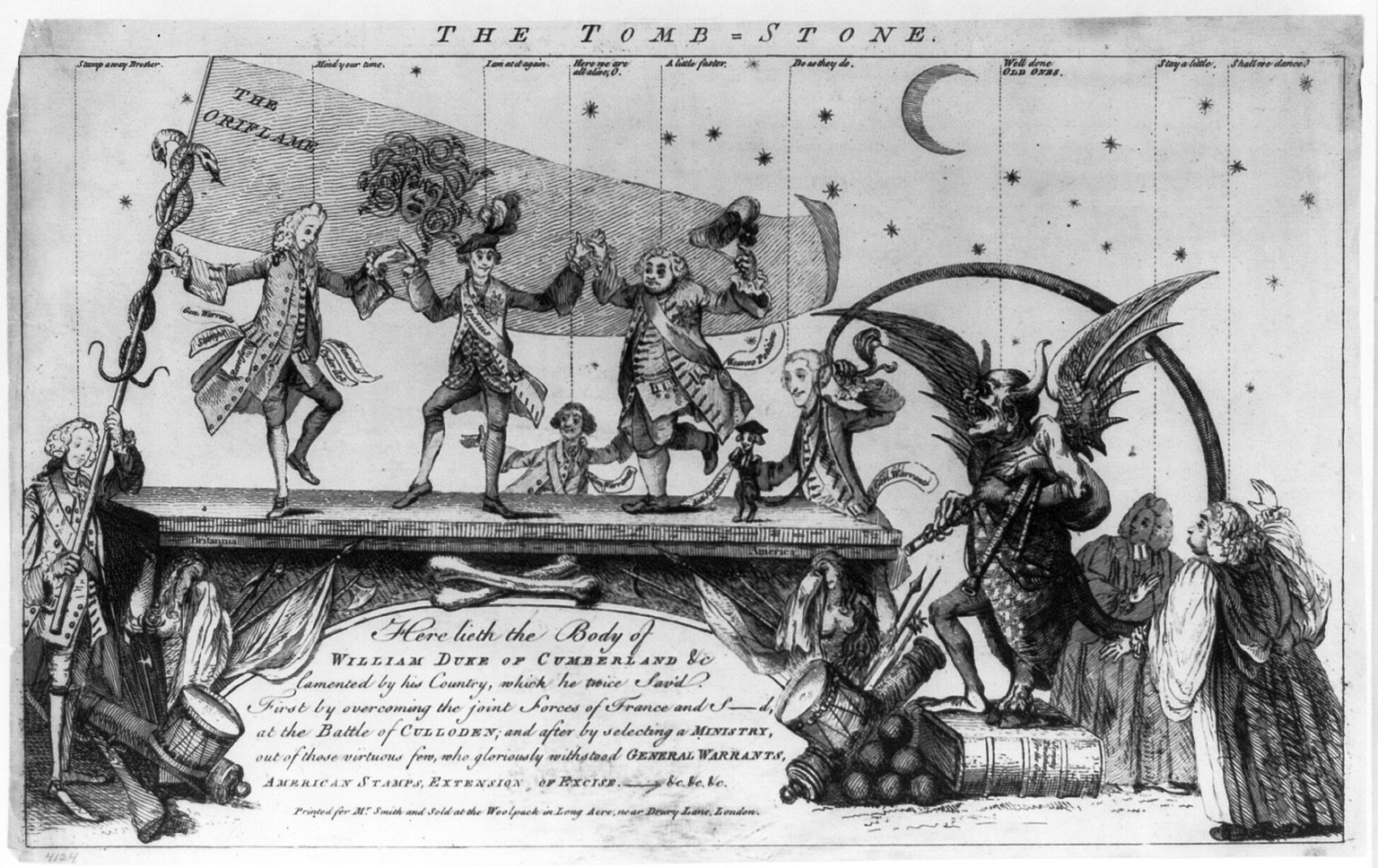
"The Tombstone", published October 1765

Cumberland's final years were lived out during the first five years of the reign of his nephew, George III, who acceded to the throne on the death of William's father on 25 October 1760. Cumberland became a very influential advisor to the King and was instrumental in establishing the First Rockingham Ministry. Cabinet meetings were held either at Cumberland Lodge, his home in Windsor, or at Upper Grosvenor Street, his house in London. Cumberland never fully recovered from his wound at Dettingen, and was obese. In August 1760, he suffered a stroke and, on 31 October 1765, he died at his home on Upper Grosvenor Street at age 44. He was buried beneath the floor of the nave of the Henry VII Lady Chapel in Westminster Abbey. He died unmarried.

== Honours and arms ==
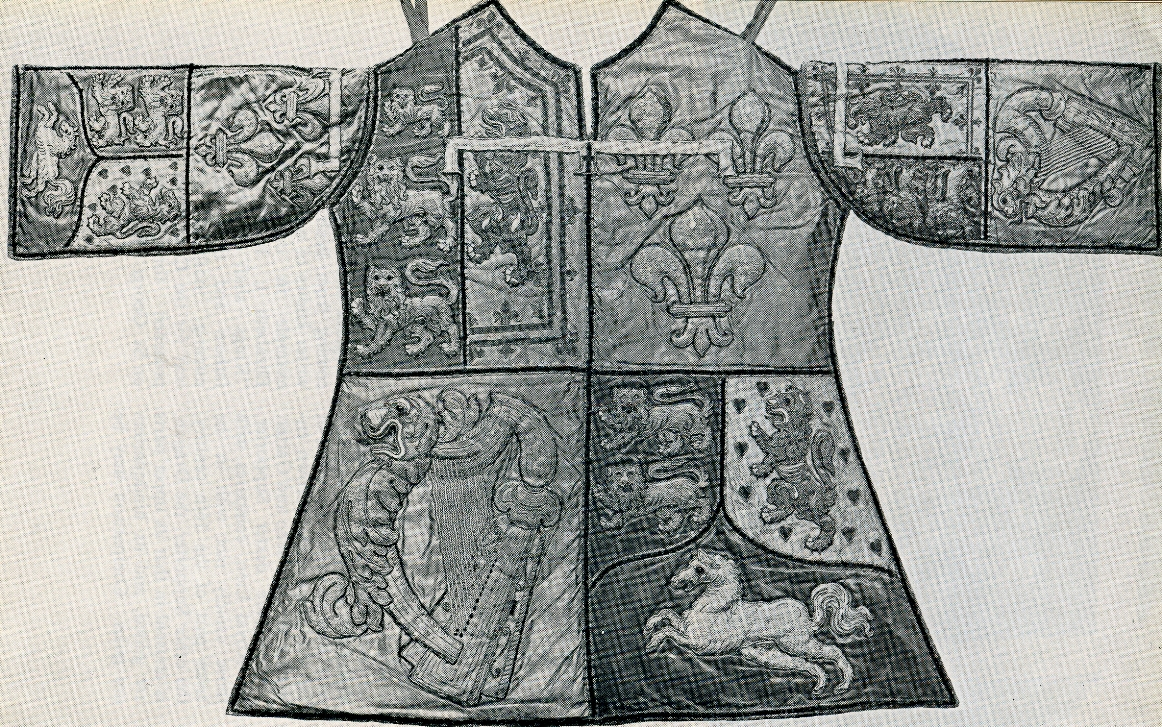
The tabard of Blanc Coursier Herald, Cumberland's private officer of arms

=== Honours ===
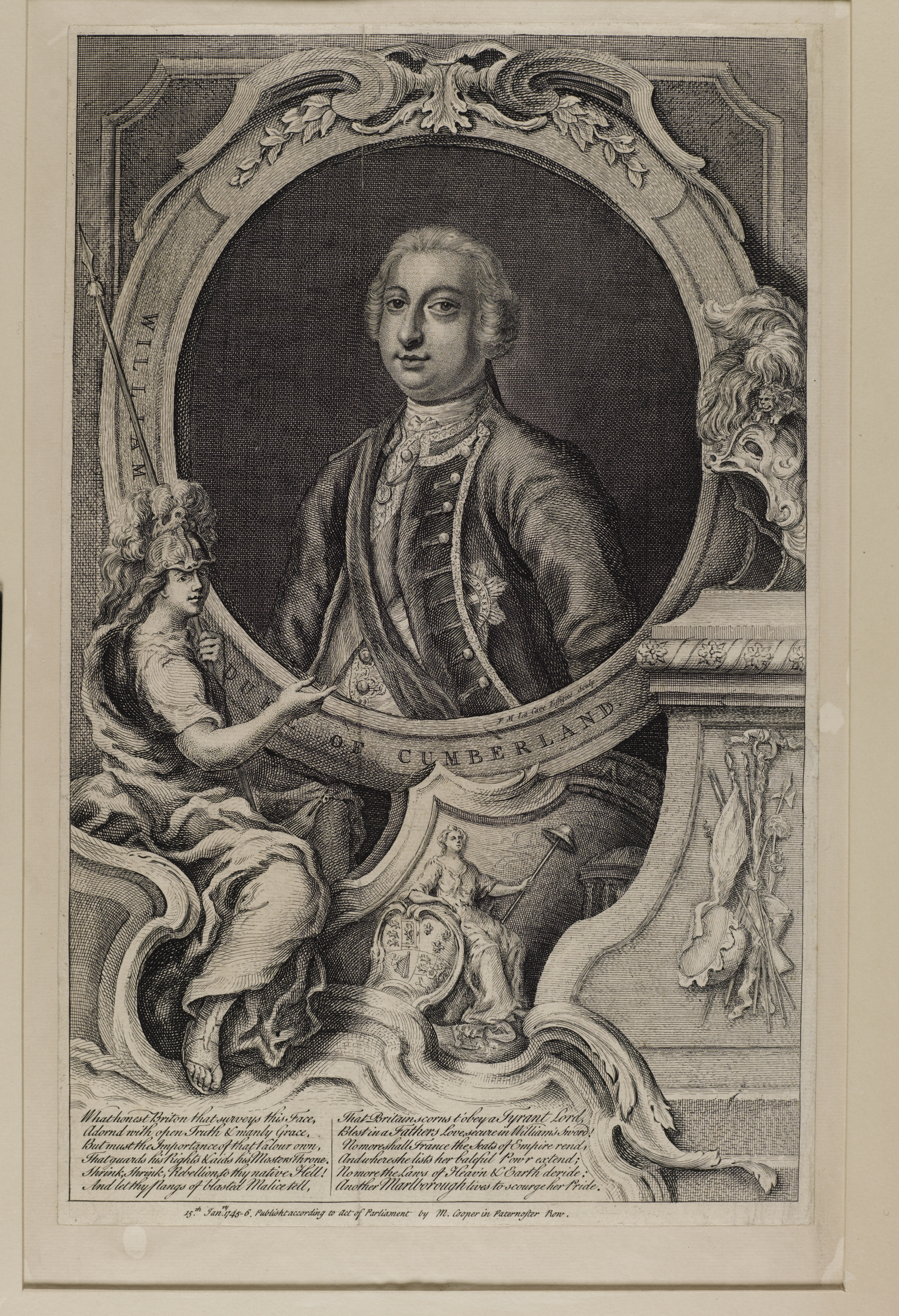
Jacobite broadside – François Morellon la Cave, Effigies sculpt.

British Honours

- KG: Knight of the Garter, 1730
- KB: Knight of the Bath, 1725
- PC: Privy Counsellor, 1742

Academic

- 1751–1765: Chancellor of the University of Dublin
- Chancellor of King's College, Aberdeen

=== Arms ===
On 20 July 1725, as a grandchild of the sovereign, William was granted use of the arms of the realm, differenced by a label argent of five points, the centre point bearing a cross gules, the first, second, fourth and fifth each bearing a canton gules. On 30 August 1727, as a child of the sovereign, William's difference changed to a label argent of three points, the centre point bearing a cross gules.

Coat of arms 1725–1727

Coat of arms 1727–1765

== Legacy ==
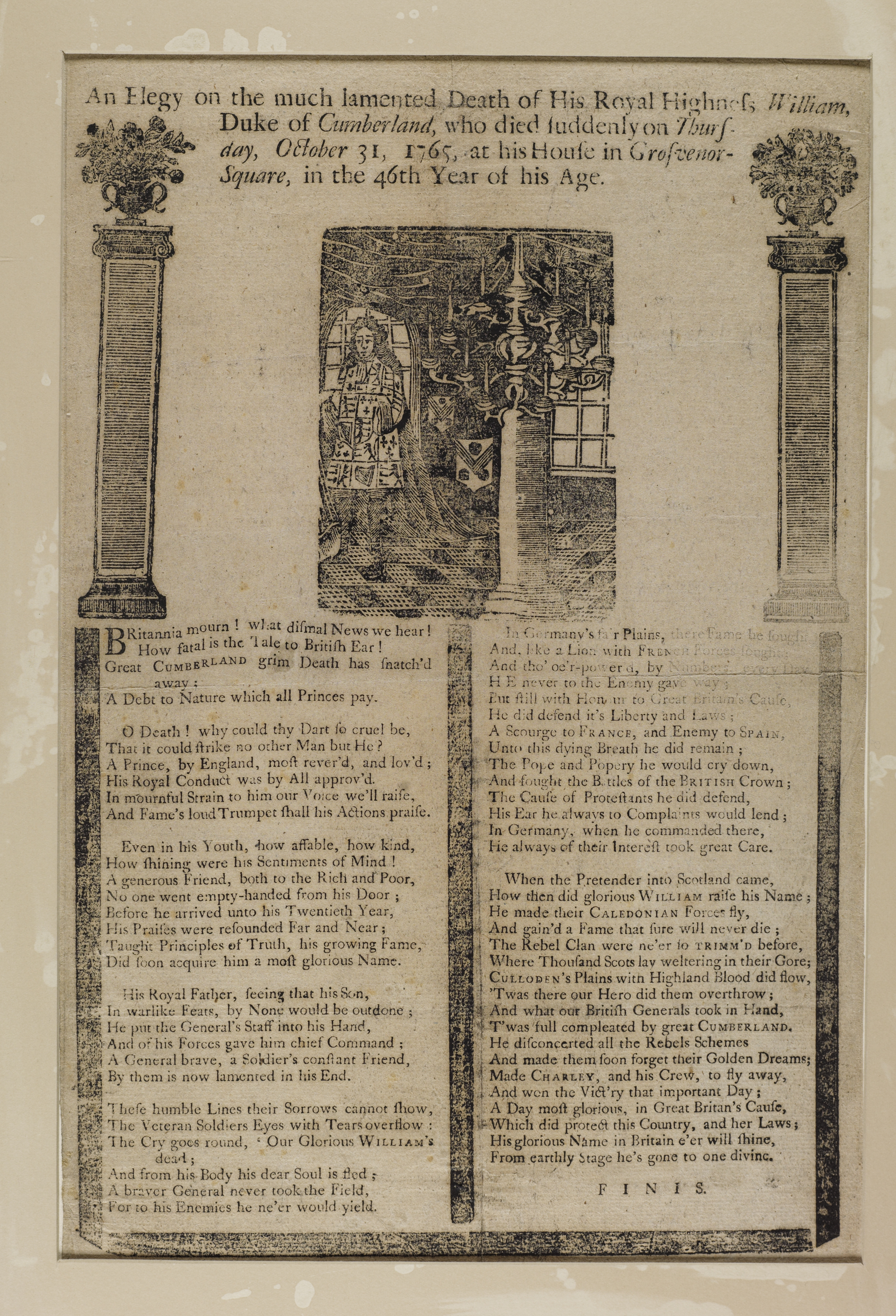
Elegy on the much lamented death of His Royal Highness William, Duke of Cumberland..

Prince William County, Virginia is named for him, as well as Cumberland County, Maine, Cumberland County, New Jersey, Cumberland County, North Carolina, and Cumberland County, Virginia. Various other places in the American colonies were named after him, including the Cumberland River, the Cumberland Gap and the Cumberland Mountains. In Britain, Cumberland Road in Kew and the Grade II listed Cumberland Gate into Kew Gardens are named after him.

In 2005 he was selected by the BBC History Magazine as the 18th century's worst Briton.

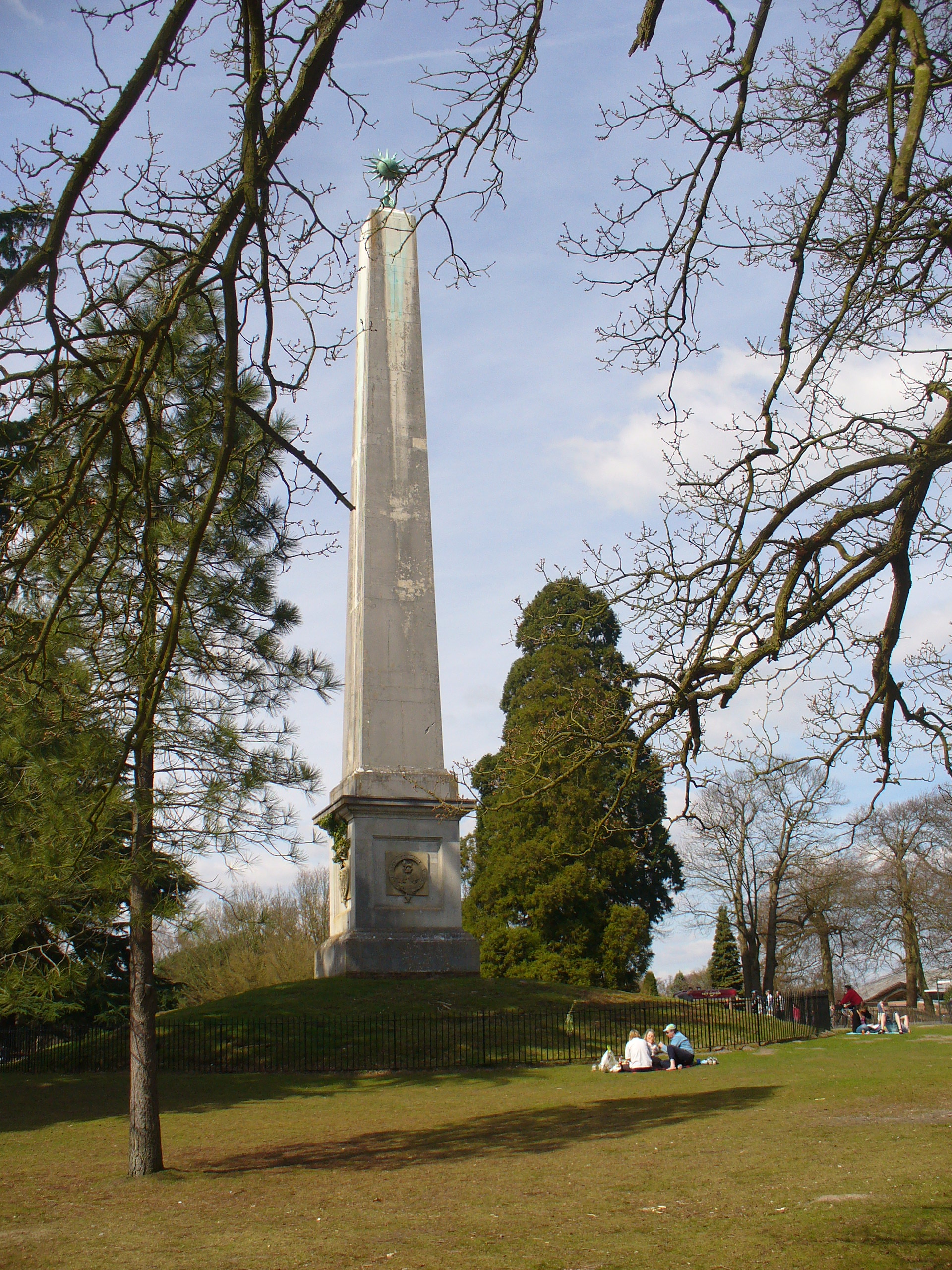
Cumberland Obelisk, Windsor Great Park

A memorial obelisk was erected to the Duke's military services in Windsor Great Park. It is inscribed "THIS OBELISK RAISED BY COMMAND OF KING GEORGE THE SECOND COMMEMORATES THE SERVICES OF HIS SON WILLIAM DUKE OF CUMBERLAND THE SUCCESS OF HIS ARMS AND THE GRATITUDE OF HIS FATHER THIS TABLET WAS INSCRIBED BY HIS MAJESTY KING WILLIAM THE FOURTH". According to a local park guide and Scottish historian Murray Pittock, the obelisk was originally inscribed "Culloden" but Queen Victoria had "Culloden" removed.

An equestrian statue of the Duke was erected in London's Cavendish Square in 1770, but was removed in 1868 since by that time the 'butcher of Culloden' was generally reviled. The original plinth remained.

In 2019, plans by developers to name a street close to the battlefield after the Duke were rejected by the Highland Council.

== Sources ==
- Anderson, Fred (2000). Crucible of War: The Seven Years' War and the Fate of Empire in British North America, 1754–1766. Faber and Faber. ISBN 978-0-571-20535-6.
- Blomfield, David (1994). Kew Past. Phillimore & Co. Ltd. ISBN 0-85033-923-5.
- Browning, Reed (1995). The War of the Austrian Succession. Palgrave MacMillan. ISBN 978-0-312-12561-5.
- Chisholm, Hugh, ed. (1911b). "Cumberland, William Augustus, Duke of" . Encyclopædia Britannica. Vol. 7 (11th ed.). Cambridge University Press. p. 624.
- Clee, Nicholas (2011). Eclipse. Black Swan. ISBN 978-0-552-77442-0.
- Glover, Richard (2008). Peninsular Preparation: The Reform of the British Army 1795–1809. Cambridge University Press. ISBN 978-0-521-08392-8.
- Longmate, Norman (2001). Island Fortress: The Defence of Great Britain, 1603–1945. Pimlico. ISBN 978-0-09-174837-1.
- Plank, Geoffrey (2003). An Unsettled Conquest: The British Campaign Against the Peoples of Acadia. University of Pennsylvania Press. ISBN 978-0-8122-1869-5.
- Pollard, Tony (2009). Culloden: The History and Archaeology of the last Clan Battle. Pen & Sword Military. ISBN 978-1-84884-020-1.
- Rolt, Richard (1767). Historical memoirs of His late Royal Highness William-Augustus, Duke of Cumberland.
- Sosin, Jack (1957). Louisburg and the Peace of Aix-la-Chapelle, 1748. The William and Mary Quarterly, Third Series, Vol. 14, No. 4.
- Speck, William (1995). The Butcher: The Duke of Cumberland and the Suppression of the 45. Welsh Academic Press. ISBN 978-1-86057-000-1.
- Speck, W.A. (2004). "Prince William, Duke of Cumberland". Oxford Dictionary of National Biography (online ed.). Oxford University Press. doi:10.1093/ref:odnb/29455. (Subscription, Wikipedia Library access or UK public library membership required.)
- Stanhope, Phillip (2002). History of England from the Peace of Utrecht to the Peace of Versailles: 1713–1783: Volume 4: 1748–1763. Adamant Media Corporation. ISBN 978-0-543-67669-6.
- Stanley, Arthur (2008). Historical memorials of Westminster Abbey. BiblioBazaar. ISBN 978-0-559-69153-9.
- Tomasson, Katherine (1974). Battles of the '45. Pan Books.
- Thompson, Arthur (1865). The Victoria history of England: from the landing of Julius Caesar, B.C. 54 to the marriage of H.R.H. Albert Edward Prince of Wales A.D. 1863. Routledge, Warne and Routledge.
- Thurley, Simon (2003). Hampton Court: A Social and Architectural History. Yale University Press. ISBN 978-0-300-10223-9.
- Van der Kiste, John (1997). George II and Queen Caroline. Sutton Publishing. ISBN 0-7509-1321-5.
- Royle, Trevor (2008). Culloden: Scotland's Last Battle and the Forging of the British Empire. Little, Brown. ISBN 978-1-408-70401-1.
- Davies, John (1938). A King in Toils. L. Drummond.
- Axelrod, Alan (2008). Blooding at Great Meadows: Young George Washington and the Battle That Shaped the Man. Running Press Book Press.
- Hall, Richard (2016). Atlantic Politics, Military Strategy and the French and Indian War. Palgrave Macmillan. ISBN 978-3-319-30664-3.
- Cusick, Ray (2013). Wellington's Rifles: The Origins, Development and Battles of the Rifle Regiments in the Peninsular War and at Waterloo. Pen & Sword Military. ISBN 978-1-781-59287-8.
- Gallay, Alan (2015). Colonial Wars of North America, 1512–1763 (Routledge Revivals): An Encyclopedia. Pen & Sword Military. ISBN 978-1-138-89108-1.
- Waldman, Carl (1989). Atlas of the North American Indian. Facts on File Inc. ISBN 978-0-816-02136-9.
- Tucker, Spencer (1989). The Encyclopedia of North American Indian Wars, 1607-1890 3 Volume Set: A Political, Social, and Military History. ABC-CLIO. ISBN 978-1-851-09697-8.
- Dilisio, Rock (2008). American Advance: Westward From The French & Indian War. iUniverse. ISBN 978-0-595-52486-0.
- Grenier, John (2008). The First Way of War: American War Making on the Frontier, 1607–1814. Cambridge University Press. ISBN 978-0-521-73263-5.

Attribution:

Prince William, Duke of Cumberland House of Hanover Cadet branch of the House of Welf Born: 15 April 1721 Died: 31 October 1765
Military offices
| Preceded by The Earl of Scarbrough | Colonel of the Coldstream Regiment of Foot Guards; 1740–1742 | Succeeded by The Duke of Marlborough |
| Preceded by Sir Charles Wills | Colonel of the 1st Regiment of Foot Guards; 1742–1757 | Succeeded by The Viscount Ligonier |
| Vacant Title last held by The Duke of Marlborough (1714–1717) | Captain-General of the British Army; 1744–1757 | Vacant Title next held by The Duke of York and Albany (1799–1809) |
| Preceded by George Wade | Commander-in-Chief of the Forces; 1745–1757 | Succeeded by The Viscount Ligonier |
Academic offices
| Preceded by The Duke of Chandos | Chancellor of the University of St Andrews; 1746–1765 | Succeeded by The Earl of Kinnoull |
| Preceded by The Prince of Wales | Chancellor of the University of Dublin; 1751–1765 | Succeeded by The Duke of Bedford |
