= Battle of Hastenbeck =

1757 battle

Coordinates: 52°4′30″N 9°26′0″E

- Part of the Seven Years' War
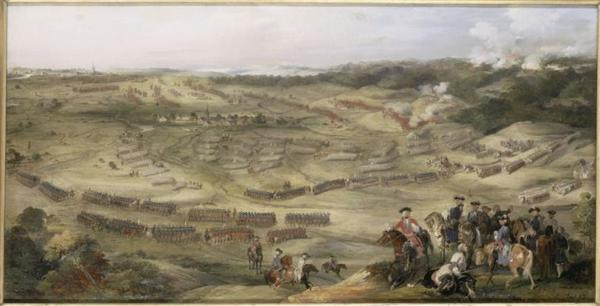
- The Battle of Hastenbeck by Louis-Edouard Rioult
Date	26 July 1757
Location	near Hastenbeck, southeast of Hamelin, Hanover
Result	French victory
Territorial changes	French forces occupy the Electorate of Hanover

Belligerents
(Province of Hanover) Hanover; Great Britain; Hesse-Kassel; Brunswick	France

Commanders and leaders
(Kingdom of Great Britain) William Augustus, Duke of Cumberland	(Kingdom of France) Louis Charles d'Estrées

Strength
30,000 infantry, 5,000 cavalry, 28 guns	50,000 infantry, 10,000 cavalry, 68 guns

Casualties and losses
1,411 killed, wounded and missing	1,290 killed and wounded

The Battle of Hastenbeck (26 July 1757) was fought as part of the Invasion of Hanover during the Seven Years' War between the allied forces of Hanover, Hesse-Kassel (or Hesse-Cassel) and Brunswick, and the French. The allies were defeated by the French army near Hamelin in the Electorate of Hanover.

== Prelude ==
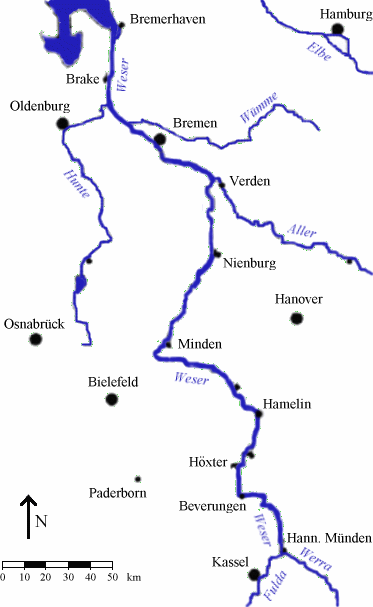
The Weser and the fortresses at Hamelin, Minden, Nienburg and Bremen formed a natural line of defence.

The French, who were allied with Austria, Russia, Sweden and Saxony during the Seven Years' War, invaded Germany in April 1757 with two armies, altogether about 100,000 soldiers. The French hoped to draw the attention of the Kingdom of Prussia, which was allied with Britain and Hanover, away from the Bohemian theatre where Prussia and Austria fought several battles (Lobositz, Prague, Kolin).

One of the two French armies under command of Prince de Soubise marched through central Germany. It joined the Imperial Army, or "Reichsarmee", commanded by von Hildburghausen. This coalition army later met a Prussian army at the Battle of Rossbach on 5 November 1757 with disaster.

The other French army commanded by Marshal Louis Charles d'Estrées consisted of about 50,000 infantry, 10,000 cavalry and 68 cannons. The army advanced towards the Electorate of Hanover. Prussia was heavily involved with its enemies Austria, Russia, and Sweden. and therefore was not able to help on the western front. This task was given to the Hanoverian Army of Observation which had little support from Prussia, namely six Prussian battalions. The main part of the "Hanoverian Army of Observation" came from the Hanoverian Army (about 60%) and Hesse (about 25%), smaller additional forces from Brunswick and Prussia. The total strength of the Hanoverian Army of Observation was about 30,000 infantry, 5,000 cavalry, and 28 guns. The army was commanded by Prince William, Duke of Cumberland, third son of King George II of Great Britain.

Hanover refused to defend the Rhine which is west of the Weser. This left the Prussians no choice but to abandon their fortress in Wesel and to give up the line of the Lippe in April. Cumberland's main objective was preventing the occupation of Hanover. He first concentrated his army at Bielefeld, and then after a brief stand in Brackwede, he decided to cross the Weser south of Minden. The main idea was to use the Weser as a natural defense line and to make it impossible for the French troops to cross the river. Cumberland deployed his main forces at Hamelin, two kilometers northwest of Hastenbeck and left the Prussian battalions as garrison forces in Minden. He also deployed small patrols all along the Weser. Meanwhile, the French sent a detachment to the north to capture Emden, which was an important access point for Britain to Europe, on 3 July. Later they sent another detachment to the south, which took Kassel on 15 July.

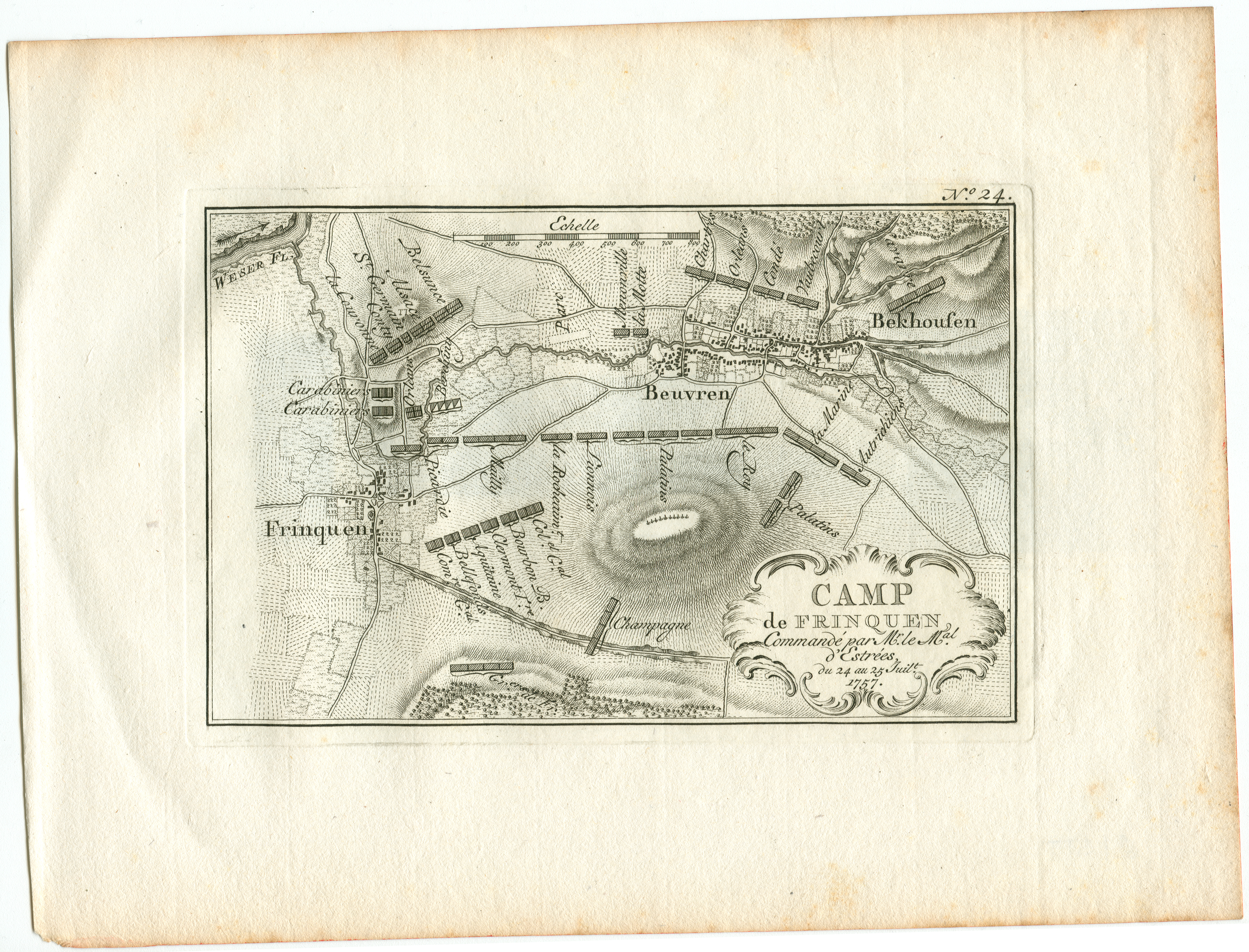
French camps from 24 to 25 July 1757 around Frenke; copper engraving "Nr. 24" by the Dutchman Jacob van der Schley

During the night of 7 July, a strong French advance guard crossed the Weser close to the town Beverungen. While the Weser normally cannot easily be forded, during the summer the water level drops down to a low of 80 cm (~3 feet) between Münden and Hamelin, making it possible for infantry and cavalry to cross. The French advance troops then marched to the north and established a bridgehead at Höxter. The main army crossed the Weser on 16 July, leaving the Duke of Cumberland no choice but to deploy his troops south of Hamelin and to engage d'Estrées. The Prussian battalions were then recalled by Frederick the Great, after losing the Battle of Kolin against Austria.

== Battle ==
The armies finally met on the morning of 25 July at the village of Hastenbeck. The commander of the French right flank, general François de Chevert, was ordered to engage Hanoverian troops at the village of Voremberg, but failed to drive them out. As the French left under general Duc de Broglie was still crossing the Weser near Hameln, d'Estrées decided to postpone the battle until all his troops were up.

The next day saw the Hanoverian army holding on a line from Hamelin to Voremberg. Their right flank was anchored on the Hamel river and Hastenbach creek. The center of the Hanoverian front was deployed north of the town of Hastenbeck, and an artillery battery was situated on high ground behind the town. The Hanoverian left consisted of two entrenched batteries, with grenadier battalions protecting the guns. The left flank was anchored on the Obensburg. Cumberland made the mistake of assuming the hill to be impassable to formed troops and deployed a meagre three Jäger companies on its summit, effectively leaving the Hanoverian left flank in the air.

General Chevert was ordered to flank the Hanoverian position with four brigades of troops from Picardy, la Marine, Navarre, and Eu. At 9 AM, this force advanced toward the Obensburg in three battalion columns and quickly overwhelmed the enemy Jägers. The Duke of Cumberland, seeing his position threatened from the rear, ordered his reserves and the grenadier battalions protecting the guns to recapture the Obensburg. The use of these grenadier battalions in the counterattack on the Obensburg meant that they were no longer available in the center when the main French attacks went in against the Hanoverian center.

The French main attack consisted of general d'Armentieres's attack against Voremberg with five brigades of infantry plus four regiments of dismounted dragoons. At the same time, the French center assaulted the battery immediately north of it. The Hanoverian grand battery was able to repulse several of the French attacks, but eventually the guns were overrun. When the Hanoverian reserve infantry arrived on the Obensburg, they were able to turn the tide momentarily, but as the Duke of Cumberland had begun to withdraw his army, they were unable to maintain the now-isolated position for long.

== Outcome ==
The Battle of Hastenbeck is one of the most curious battles in history since both commanders-in-chief thought that they lost the battle and were already starting to withdraw from the battlefield. The battle eventually resulted in the Convention of Klosterzeven on September 18 and the occupation of Hanover. During the battle, Hastenbeck was almost completely destroyed: only the church, the manse and the farmhouse were not destroyed.
