= Convention of Klosterzeven =

Armistice between France and Hanover

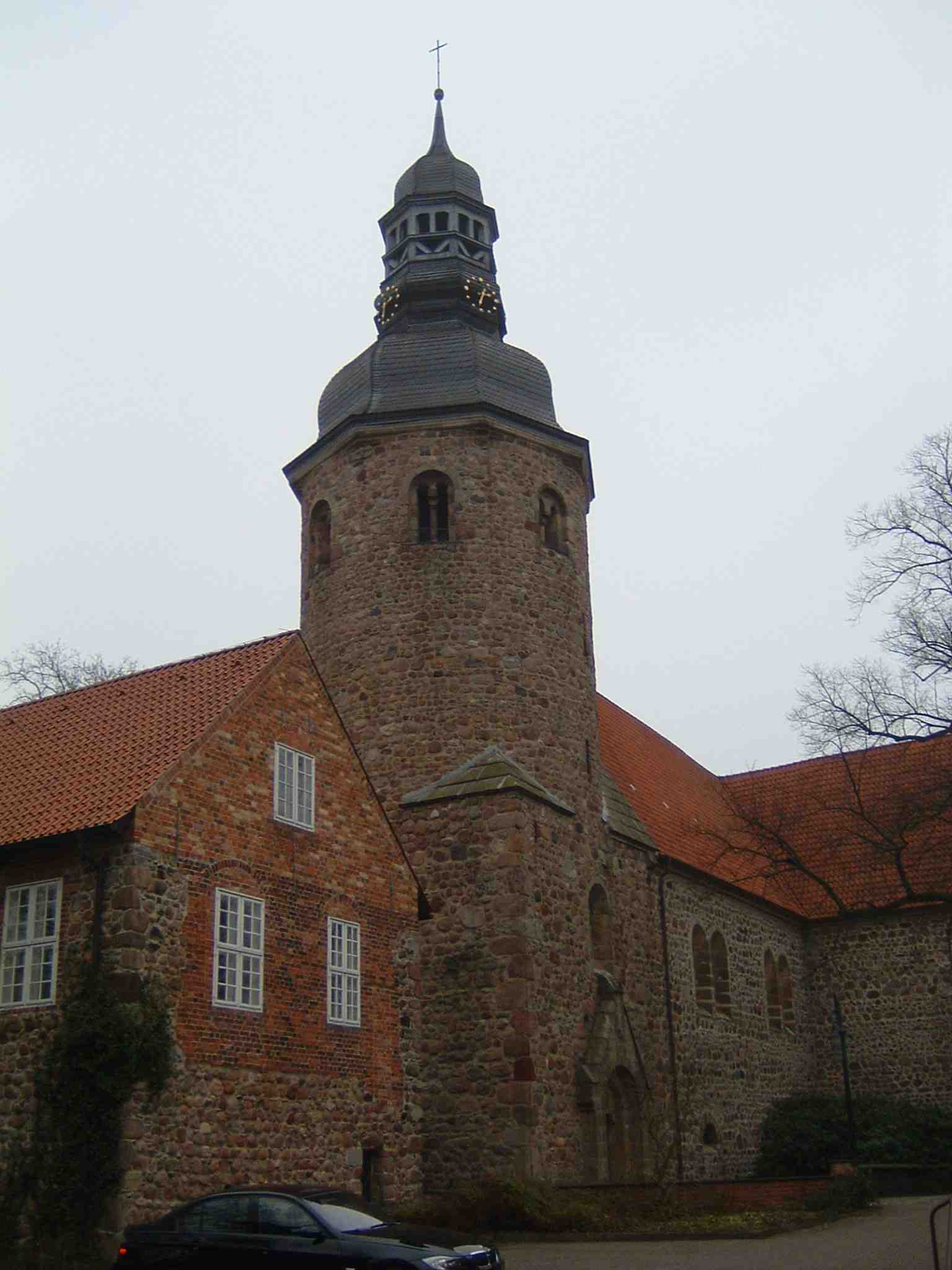
Klosterzeven

The Convention of Klosterzeven (or the Convention of Kloster-Zeven, German: Konvention von Kloster Zeven) was a convention signed on 10 September 1757 at Klosterzeven between France and the Electorate of Hanover during the Seven Years' War that led to Hanover's withdrawal from the war and partial occupation by French forces.

It came in the wake of the Battle of Hastenbeck on 26 July in which Hanover had suffered a devastating defeat. Following the battle, the Hanoverian Army of Observation had retreated northwards until it had reached Stade. Cornered, Prince William, Duke of Cumberland contacted the commander-in-chief of the French army, Louis François Armand de Vignerot du Plessis, 3rd Duke of Richelieu, with a request for an armistice, which was granted.

The Convention of Klosterzeven essentially contained only four articles:

1. Conclusion of an armistice within 24 hours.
2. The auxiliary troops from Hesse, Brunswick, Saxe-Gotha, and Lippe are to be repatriated.
3. The Hanoverian Army must withdraw across the Elbe into the Duchy of Lauenburg. As an exception, a garrison of 4,000 to 6,000 men can remain in the fortress of Stade.
4. All detached units must withdraw to Stade within 48 hours.

The agreement was deeply unpopular with Hanover's ally Prussia, whose western frontier was severely weakened by the agreement.

After the Prussian victory at Rossbach on 5 November 1757, King George II was encouraged to disavow the treaty. Under pressure from Frederick the Great and William Pitt, the convention was subsequently revoked and Hanover re-entered the war the following year. The Duke of Cumberland, who had signed the agreement on behalf of Hanover, was disgraced when he returned to Britain, ending his previously distinguished military career. He was replaced as commander by Duke Ferdinand of Brunswick-Wolfenbüttel.

== See also ==
- Great Britain in the Seven Years War

== Bibliography ==
- Anderson, Fred (2001). Crucible of War: The Seven Years' War and the Fate of Empire in British North America, 1754-1766. Faber and Faber.
- Charteris, Evan (1925). William Augustus, Duke of Cumberland and the seven years' war. London.
- Mediger, Walther (1984). "Hastenbeck und Zeven. Der Eintritt Hannovers in den Siebenjährigen Krieg". Niedersächsisches Jahrbuch für Landesgeschichte (in German). 56: 137–166.
- Szabo, Franz A. J. (2007). The Seven Years' War in Europe, 1756–1763. New York.
