= Hanoverian Army of Observation =

Field army of the Electorate of Hanover in the Seven Years' War

The Hanoverian Army of Observation was a field army of the Electorate of Hanover in the Seven Years' War.

It was led by Prince William, Duke of Cumberland until it was dissolved by the Convention of Klosterzeven in September 1757. It was reestablished after November 1757 under command of Duke Ferdinand of Brunswick-Wolfenbüttel.

== History ==
=== Formation ===
In the Seven Years' War, all the major European powers of the time participated: Prussia and Great Britain on the one hand, and the Austrian Habsburg Monarchy, France, Russia, and the Holy Roman Empire on the other. While Prussia, Austria, and Russia primarily fought for supremacy in Central Europe, Great Britain and France also had their colonies in North America and India at stake.

Most of the smaller German Imperial Estates attempted to maintain their neutrality in this war. Even after the outbreak of the war, the government of the Electorate of Hanover declared its loyalty to the Kaiser, with its monarch residing in London and at war with the Kaiser. The British King George II, on the other hand, expected the Privy Council of Hanover to subscribe to his policy.
He established an "Observation army" on the continent, whose supreme command he entrusted to his son, Prince William, Duke of Cumberland. The army included 27,000 men from Hanover, 10,000 from Hesse-Kassel, 1,600 from Saxe-Gotha-Altenburg, 6,000 from Brunswick-Wolfenbüttel, and 1,350 men from Schaumburg-Lippe.

=== French Invasion of Hanover (1757) ===
Austria and France now treated the Electorate of Hanover as a belligerent, and the French army marched into Westphalia with 100,000 men in April 1757. The Army of Observation was forced to withdraw behind the Weser line. On July 26, 1757, a decisive battle took place near the village of Hastenbeck near Hamelin, from which the French emerged victorious. Following this, the Army of Observation, pursued by the French, withdrew across the Weser toward the fortress of Stade. Cornered, Cumberland contacted the commander-in-chief of the French army, Marshal Duke Richelieu, with a request for an armistice.

The text of the convention, known as the Convention of Klosterzeven, dictated by Richelieu, along with Cumberland's proposed improvements summarized in separate articles, was signed by Richelieu on September 9 in Bremervörde, and by the Marshal on September 8 and 10, 1757, at his headquarters in Klosterzeven Abbey. This ceased hostilities within 24 hours. Some 4 to 6,000 Hanovarian soldiers were allowed to stay in the Stade fortress, while the rest was to cross the Elbe with the Duke into Saxe-Lauenburg, and the contingents of the other German princes were to disband and return home.

With Cumberland's declaration of neutrality, Hanover, Hesse, Brunswick, and Schaumburg-Lippe were occupied by the French. The British King and Hanoverian Elector, George II, did not accept the Convention of Klosterzeven, removed his son's command of the army, and waited for a favorable opportunity to resume the war effort, despite the desperate situation.

=== Reformation of the Army (1758-1763) ===
After the Prussians defeated the French and the combined Imperial troops at the Battle of Rossbach on November 5, 1757, George II and the Privy Council of Hanover agreed to tear up the Convention of Klosterzeven and appoint Duke Ferdinand of Brunswick-Wolfenbüttel, who was in Prussian service, as the commander of a new allied British-Hanoverian army.
Duke Ferdinand succeeded in liberating Hanover and the other occupied territories and expelling the French in the spring of 1758. Until the end of the Seven Years' War, he fought several battles against the French and managed to prevent a new occupation of Hanover and even to drive the French back still further.
