= August Wilhelm, Duke of Brunswick-Wolfenbüttel-Bevern =

Duke of Brunswick-Bevern

August William, Duke of Brunswick-Lüneburg
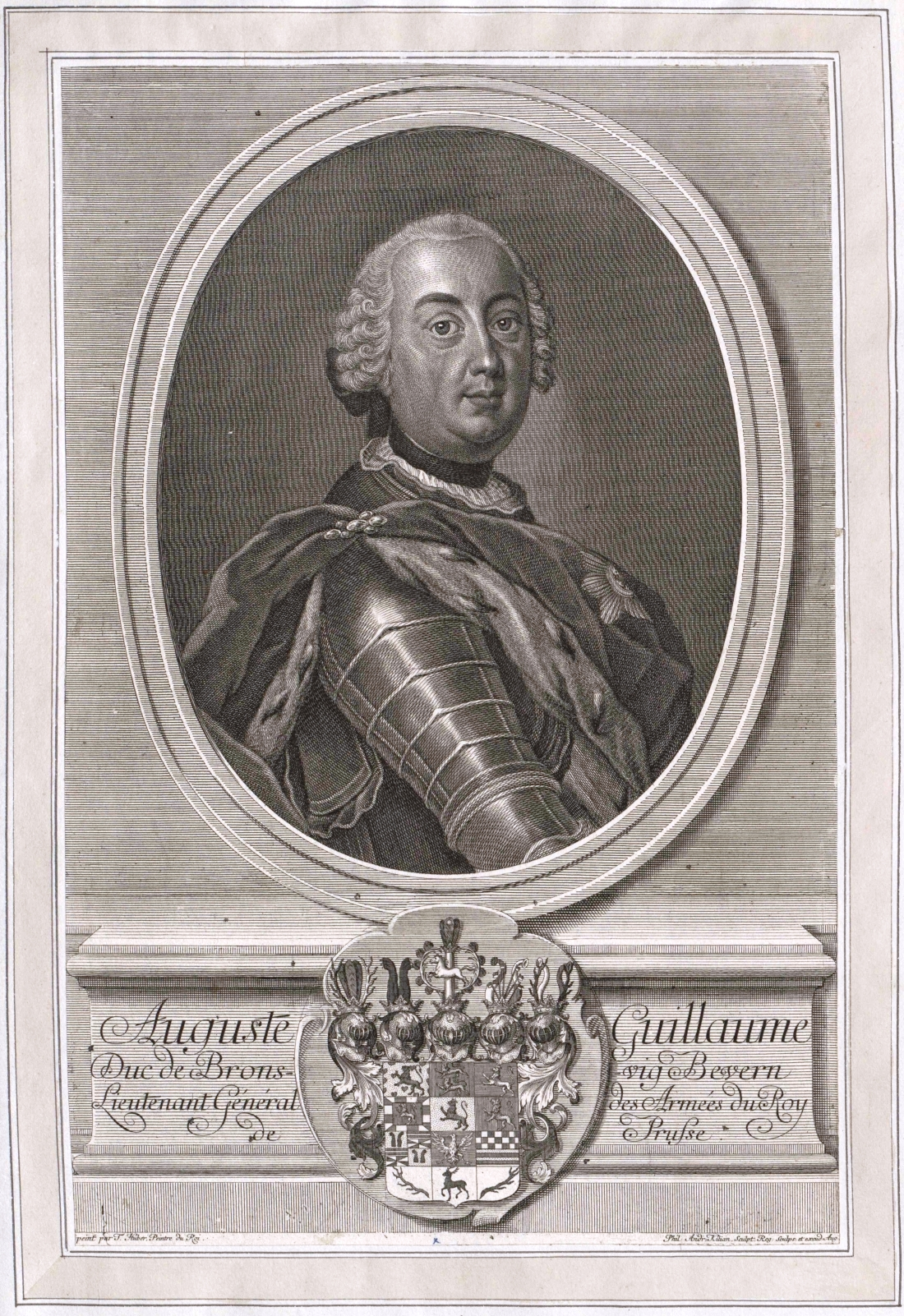
- Born: 10 October 1715; Brunswick
- Died: 2 August 1781 (aged 65); Stettin
- House: House of Guelph
- Father: Ernest Ferdinand, Duke of Brunswick-Lüneburg
- Mother: Eleanor Charlotte of Courland

August Wilhelm, Duke of Brunswick-Wolfenbüttel-Bevern (10 October 1715 in Braunschweig – 2 August 1781 in Stettin), Prussian soldier, son of Ernest Ferdinand, Duke of Brunswick-Lüneburg, was born in Braunschweig in 1715, and entered the Prussian army in 1731, becoming colonel of an infantry regiment in 1739. He won great distinction at the battle of Hohenfriedberg as a major-general, and was promoted lieutenant-general in 1750.

== Biography ==
Bevern was one of the most experienced and exact soldiers in the army of Frederick the Great. He commanded a wing in the battle of Lobositz in 1756, and defeated the Austrians under Marshal Königsegg in a well-fought battle at Reichenberg on 21 April 1757. He took part in the battles of Prague and Kolin and the retreat to Görlitz, and subsequently commanded the Prussians left behind by Frederick in the autumn of 1757 when he marched against the French.

Bevern conducted a defensive campaign against overwhelming numbers with great skill, but he soon lost the valuable assistance of General Winterfeldt, who was killed in a skirmish at Moys; and he was eventually brought to battle and suffered a heavy defeat at the battle of Breslau on 22 November. He fell into the hands of the Austrians on the following morning, and remained prisoner for a year. He was made general of infantry in 1759, and on 11 August 1762 inflicted a severe defeat at Reichenbach on an Austrian army endeavouring to relieve Schweidnitz. Bevern retired, after the peace of Hubertusburg, to his government of Stettin, where he died in peace in 1781.

== Ancestors ==
Ancestors of August Wilhelm, Duke of Brunswick-Wolfenbüttel-Bevern

16. Henry, Duke of Brunswick-Lüneburg
8. Augustus the Younger, Duke of Brunswick-Wolfenbüttel
17. Ursula of Saxe-Lauenburg
4. Ferdinand Albert I, Duke of Brunswick-Lüneburg
18. John Albert II, Duke of Mecklenburg
9. Elisabeth Sophie of Mecklenburg
19. Elisabeth of Mecklenburg-Gadebusch
2. Ernest Ferdinand, Duke of Brunswick-Lüneburg
20. Maurice, Landgrave of Hesse-Kassel
10. Frederick, Landgrave of Hesse-Eschwege
21. Juliane of Nassau-Siegen
5. Christine of Hesse-Eschwege
22. John Casimir, Count Palatine of Kleeburg
11. Countess Palatine Eleonora Catherine of Zweibrücken
23. Catherine of Sweden
1. August William, Duke of Brunswick-Lüneburg
24. Wilhelm Kettler
12. Jacob Kettler
25. Duchess Sophie of Prussia
6. Frederick Casimir Kettler
26. George William, Elector of Brandenburg
13. Margravine Louise Charlotte of Brandenburg
27. Elisabeth Charlotte of the Palatinate
3. Eleanor Charlotte of Courland
28. John VII, Count of Nassau-Siegen
14. Henry of Nassau-Siegen
29. Margaret, daughter of John II of Schleswig-Holstein-Sonderburg
7. Countess Sophie Amalie of Nassau-Siegen
30. Georg Ernst of Limburg Stirum
15. Mary Magdalene of Limburg-Stirum
31. Magdalena, daughter of Arnols III of Bentheim

August Wilhelm, Duke of Brunswick-Wolfenbüttel-Bevern House of Guelph Born: 1715 Died: 1781
Preceded by Ernest Ferdinand	Duke of Brunswick-Bevern; 1746-1781	Succeeded by Frederick Charles Ferdinand
