= August of Saxe-Weissenfels (1650–1674) =

German nobleman

- Born: 3 December 1650; Halle
- Died: 11 August 1674 (aged 23); Halle
- Buried: Neu-Augustenburg Castle in Weissenfels
- Noble family: House of Wettin
- Spouse: Charlotte of Hesse-Eschwege
- Father: Augustus, Duke of Saxe-Weissenfels
- Mother: Anna Maria of Mecklenburg-Schwerin

August of Saxe-Weissenfels (3 December 1650 – 11 August 1674) was a member of the Albertine branch of the House of Wettin. He was a titular Duke of Saxe-Weissenfels and a Provost of Magdeburg. He is sometimes called August the Younger, to distinguish him from his father.

== Background ==
August was the second son of the Duke Augustus of Saxe-Weissenfels and his first wife Anna Maria, the daughter of Duke Adolf Frederick I of Mecklenburg-Schwerin.

== Life ==
In 1659, Prince August joined the Fruitbearing Society, which was led by his father. He used the nickname der Behutsame ("the Cautious"). When he was ten years old, he was elected, at the instigation of his father, who was also Archbishop of Magdeburg, as provost of the archdiocese of Magdeburg, by the cathedral chapter. After August's death, this post went to his brother Henry.

August died on 11 August 1674, at the age of 23. He was buried in the ducal crypt in the church of Neu-Augustenburg Castle.

== Marriage and issue ==
On 25 August 1673 in Halle, he married Charlotte, the daughter of Landgrave Frederick of Hesse-Eschwege from his marriage to Countess Palatine Eleonora Catherine of Zweibrücken, the daughter of John Casimir, Count Palatine of Kleeburg. After August's death, Charlotte married Count John Adolph of Bentheim-Tecklenburg, from whom she later divorces.

Charlotte and August had one child, who died at birth on 24 April 1674 in Halle.
