= Johann Adolf I of Saxe-Weissenfels =

German duke

Johann Adolf I
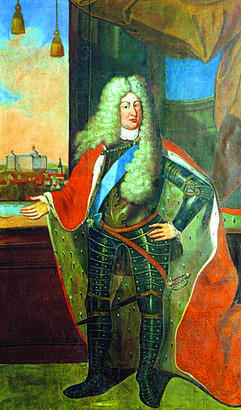
- Portrait of Johann Adolf I by an unknown artist, c. 1680–1697

Duke of Saxe-Weissenfels
- Reign: 4 June 1680 – 27 May 1697
- Predecessor: Augustus
- Successor: Johann Georg
- Born: 2 November 1649; Halle
- Died: 24 May 1697 (aged 47); Weissenfels
- Spouse: Johanna Magdalena of Saxe-Altenburg (m. 1671; died 1686) Christiane Wilhelmine of Bünau (m. 1692)
- Issue among others..: Magdalena Sibylla, Duchess of Saxe-Eisenach; Johann Georg, Duke of Saxe-Weissenfels; Christian, Duke of Saxe-Weissenfels; Sophia, Countess of Brandenburg-Bayreuth; Johann Adolf II, Duke of Saxe-Weissenfels
- House: Wettin
- Father: Augustus, Duke of Saxe-Weissenfels
- Mother: Anna Maria of Mecklenburg-Schwerin

Johann Adolf I, Duke of Saxe-Weissenfels (2 November 1649 in Halle – 24 May 1697 in Weissenfels), was a duke of Saxe-Weissenfels-Querfurt and member of the House of Wettin. He was the first son of Augustus, Duke of Saxe-Weissenfels, and his first wife, Anna Maria of Mecklenburg-Schwerin.

== Accession to the Duchy and continuation of the patronage ==
After the death of his father on 4 June 1680 and the loss of the Archbishopric of Magdeburg (which was secularised by Brandenburg and made over into the Duchy of Magdeburg), Johann Adolf dedicated his first efforts to finishing the still incomplete Schloss Neu-Augustusburg that was begun by his father in 1660; construction at the castle resumed on 18 August 1680.

The consecration of the castle chapel took place on 1 November 1682 and the castle was finally paved in the year 1694. A large theatre had been built earlier that sponsored performances of opera in German beginning in 1685.

At his estate, near the Guardhouses (Kavaliershaeuser), Johann Adolf created the most important formal garden in central Germany of his time. In 1690 pipes were built to supply the castle complex with water from the Selauer Area. The city of Weissenfels prospered to the point where it became not only an administrative center, but also an economic center.

Johann Adolf was a patron of the arts following the model of his father and other members of his family; as court Kapellmeister he appointed Johann Philipp Krieger, who had already served under the late duke. Johann Adolf also discovered the musical talent of the son of his court surgeon Georg Händel and encouraged him to let the young Georg Friedrich seek training in music.

Like his father (who had served as its head), Johann Adolf was accepted into the Fruitbearing Society.

=== Controversy over the Barby inheritance ===
When the county of Rosenburg fell to the Archbishopric of Magdeburg in 1659 after the extinction of the male line of the counts of Barby, Johann Adolf's father, duke August, continued to administer these areas (which were not a part of this patrimony) in spite of the protests of the Electors of Brandenburg and Saxony, who desired those lands in accordance with the terms of the Peace of Westphalia.

In 1666, the Elector of Saxony finally consented to give Barby and Rosenberg to duke August until the extinction of the Weissenfels line. After the death of the duke, Barby was inherited by one of his younger sons, Heinrich. Johann Adolf, who saw his inheritance reduced by his father, protested. After his father's death, Johann Adolf turned to the elector of Brandenburg to obtain a declaration of nullity for the sales contract that relinquished Rosenberg. In April 1681 it was sold for 60.000 Taler to the Elector Frederick of Brandenburg. Due to the debts accumulated by his father, Johann Adolf was forced in 1687 to sell Burg bei Magdeburg.

=== Dispute with the electorate of Saxony ===
After the death of Elector Johann Georg II of Saxony in 1680, the will of his father Johann Georg I was disputed by the new Elector Johann Georg III with regard to the appanages of his younger sons; he refused to recognise the principalities and collateral lines of his cousins. This brought some difficulties to Johann Adolf after he recognised a threat from the Saxonian Electorate to his own territories. The conflict could only be settled with the Contract of Torgau (12 May 1681) and two other contracts signed in Dresden in 1682 and 1688; with these pacts, Johann Adolf secured his rule over Querfurt and his seat in the Upper-Saxonian Council (Kreistag).

On his death, his three surviving sons, Johann Georg, Christian, and Johann Adolf II, successively assumed rulership over the duchy of Saxe-Weissenfels.

== Marriages and issue ==
In Altenburg on 25 October 1671, Johann Adolf married Johanna Magdalena of Saxe-Altenburg. They had eleven children:

1. Magdalene Sibylle (b. Halle, 3 September 1673 – d. Eisenach, 28 November 1726), married on 28 July 1708 to Johann Wilhelm, Duke of Saxe-Eisenach.
2. August Frederick (b. Halle, 15 September 1674 – d. Halle, 16 August 1675) died in infancy.
3. Johann Adolf (b. Halle, 7 June 1676 – d. Halle 18 June 1676) died in infancy.
4. Johann Georg, Duke of Saxe-Weissenfels (b. Halle, 13 July 1677 – d. Weissenfels, 16 March 1712).
5. Stillborn son (Halle, 24 July 1678).
6. Johanna Wilhelmine (b. Halle, 20 January 1680 – d. Halle, 4 July 1730) died unmarried and without issue.
7. Frederick Wilhelm (b. Weissenfels, 18 January 1681 – d. Weissenfels, 20 November 1681) died in infancy.
8. Christian, Duke of Saxe-Weissenfels (b. Weissenfels, 23 February 1682 – d. Sangerhausen, 28 June 1736).
9. Anna Marie (b. Weissenfels, 17 June 1683 – d. Sorau, 16 March 1731), married on 16 June 1705 to Count Erdmann II of Promnitz.
10. Sophie (b. Weissenfels, 2 August 1684 – d. Rosswald, Silesia, 6 May 1752), married first on 16 October 1699 to Georg Wilhelm, Margrave of Brandenburg-Bayreuth, and secondly on 14 July 1734 to Joseph Albert, Count of Hoditz und Wolframitz.
11. Johann Adolf II, Duke of Saxe-Weissenfels (b. Weissenfels, 4 September 1685 – d. Leipzig, 16 May 1746).

After the death of his wife in 1686, Johann Adolf married a second time in Querfurt on 3 February 1692 to Christiane Wilhelmine of Bünau. This marriage was morganatic and only made by contract; the completion of the marriage in the presence of a clergyman was left to his discretion. Johann Adolf give her 6,000 Taler as Morgengabe and an annual income of 3,000 Taler and the use of Schloss Dahme for her residence as dower. He admonished his sons to show her due respect, and should any children come from this marriage he would make further divisions over the family lands. After five years of marriage, Christiane Wilhelmine was created Imperial Countess (Reichgräfin) in 1697 at the request of her husband. They had no children.

| Preceded by August | Duke of Saxe-Weissenfels; 1680–1697 | Succeeded by Johann Georg |
