= Juliana of Hesse-Eschwege =

- Born: 14 May 1652; Eschwege
- Died: 20 June 1693 (aged 41); IJsselstein
- Noble family: House of Hesse
- Spouses: Johann Jakob Marchand, Baron of Lilienburg
- Father: Frederick, Landgrave of Hesse-Eschwege
- Mother: Countess Palatine Eleonora Catherine of Zweibrücken

Juliana of Hesse-Eschwege (14 May 1652 – 20 June 1693) was a German noblewoman. In her teens she was brought up at the Swedish royal court as the future queen of King Charles XI of Sweden, her cousin. However, on two occasions before the wedding Juliana became pregnant, and the engagement was eventually broken off. In 1679 or 1680, Juliana married a Dutchman and lived the rest of her life in the Netherlands, while Charles XI married Ulrike Eleonora of Denmark in 1680.

== Life ==
Juliana was born in Eschwege to Frederick, Landgrave of Hesse-Eschwege (son of Maurice of Hesse-Kassel and his second wife, Juliane of Nassau-Siegen), and Eleonora Catherine, a Swedish princess. Her maternal grandmother was Princess Catharina of Sweden, and her mother was a sister of King Charles X of Sweden. Juliana was likely named after her paternal grandmother, a daughter of John VII of Nassau-Siegen, who was herself likely named after her paternal grandmother, Juliana of Stolberg.

Juliana's mother had caused a scandal in Sweden when she confessed to her husband that she had an affair with a French lute-player and actor, Beschon, and was expecting his child. Juliana's father tried to hide the matter but it became a known scandal. It is said that Eleonora was too embarrassed to return to the Swedish court, so she preferred to live in the palace in Eschwege, although she did visit Sweden.

Juliana was described as a great beauty. She was taken to the royal Swedish court to be brought up there as the future queen of Sweden by queen dowager Hedwig Eleonora of Holstein-Gottorp, with the prospect of being married to her cousin, King Charles XI, when he reached adulthood.

These plans never came about. In 1672, during a "walk by carriage" in Stockholm with the queen dowager, Princess Juliana fell to the floor of the carriage in labour. The father of the child proved not to be her cousin the king, but a married officer of the court, Count Gustaf Lillie. The count was exiled, and Juliana was sent to the country, where she was given her own estate and court. The child, a son, was named after his father, Gustaf Gustafsson Lillie, was later raised by Baron Gustaf Adolf von der Osten. His fate is unknown.

A couple of years later, Juliana gave birth to another son. This time the father was Johann Jakob Marchand, the young, unmarried son of her Dutch housekeeper. Baptized on 29 November 1656 in Breda, Marchand was the secretary of the Dutch ambassador, and about four years younger than Juliana. In 1679, Juliana's cousin, King Charles, gave her his permission to marry her lover, who was given the title Baron von Lilienburg (Lilie's estate was named Lillienborg). They were married on 22 February 1680 in Raeftnas, Södermanland and then settled in Haarlem, the Netherlands.

Juliana died in 1693 in IJsselstein. Her husband lived ten years more and died on 7 April 1703 in IJsselstein.

Her sister, Christine of Hesse-Eschwege, became the Duchess of Brunswick-Lüneburg as the wife of Ferdinand Albert I, Duke of Brunswick-Lüneburg, and was a great-great-great-grandmother of Victoria of the United Kingdom.

== Children ==
Juliana had the following children.

With Count Gustaf Lillie:

- Gustaf Gustafsson Lillie, born 1672 Stockholm

With her husband, Johan Jakob Marchand:

- Carel Frederik (1679 – 1729)
- Eleonora (4 May 1683, IJsselstein – after 22 November 1707, Bremen?), married on 21 October 1704 in IJsselstein Mr. Johan Spiering (6 November 1672, Utrecht – 22 July 1739, Amsterdam), son of Francois Ewoutsz. Spiering and Elisabeth Maria van Someren
- Juliana (baptised 4 May 1684, IJsselstein – 24 November 1726, Jever), married in 1707 Ulrich Friedrich von Weltzien, Herr von Blexersande
- Sophia Maria (12 June 1685, IJsselstein – after 1712)
- Jacoba (born 10 July 1686 in IJsselstein, buried 9 August 1686 in IJsselstein)
- Jakob Ferdinand (born 21 May 1688 in IJsselstein, buried 28 August 1688 in IJsselstein)
- Willem Jacob (baptised 18 December 1689 in IJsselstein, died before 21 November 1703)
- Christina Francoise (baptised 7 May 1691 IJsselstein, buried 3 June 1691 IJsselstein)
