= Frederick Ferdinand =

Frederick Ferdinand may refer to:

- Frederick Ferdinand, Duke of Anhalt-Köthen (1769–1830), German prince,
- Frederick Charles Ferdinand, Duke of Brunswick-Wolfenbüttel-Bevern (1729–1809), member of the House of Guelph
- Friedrich Ferdinand, Duke of Schleswig-Holstein (1855–1934)
