= Ernest Ferdinand, Duke of Brunswick-Wolfenbüttel-Bevern =

Duke of Brunswick-Bevern

Ernest Ferdinand, Duke of Brunswick-Lüneburg
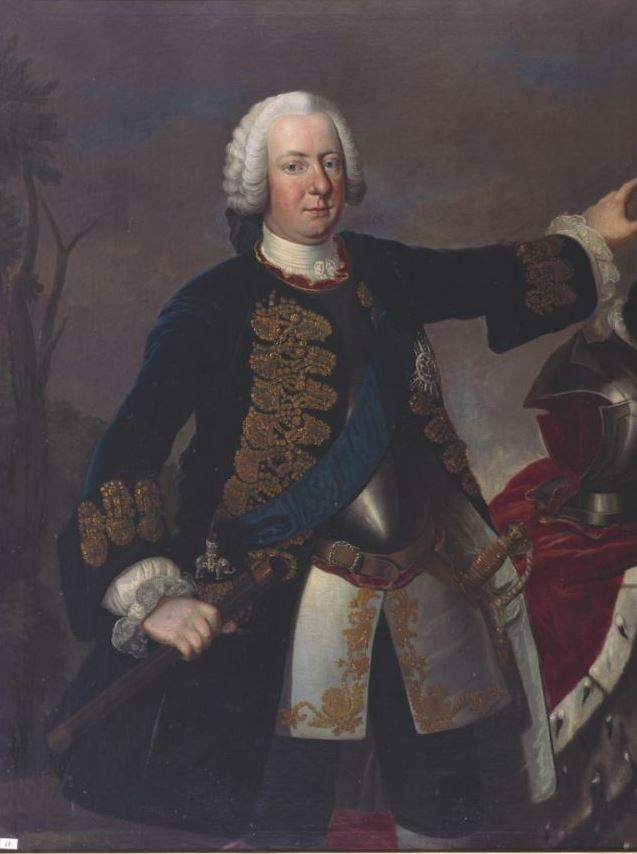
- Ernest Ferdinand, Duke of Brunswick-Lüneburg
- Born: 4 March 1682; Osterholz
- Died: 14 April 1746 (aged 64); Brunswick
- Spouse: Eleonore Charlotte of Courland (m. 1714)
- Issue: August William; Christine Sophie; Frederica; George Louis; George Frederick; Anne Marie; Frederick Charles Ferdinand
- House: House of Guelph
- Father: Ferdinand Albert I, Duke of Brunswick-Lüneburg
- Mother: Christine of Hesse-Eschwege

Ernest Ferdinand of Brunswick-Wolfenbüttel-Bevern (4 March 1682 in Osterholz – 14 April 1746 in Brunswick) was a titular Duke of Brunswick and Lüneburg. He was Prince of Brunswick-Bevern and founder of the younger Brunswick-Bevern line.

== Life ==
He was born in 1682 as the fourth son of Duke Ferdinand Albert I of Brunswick-Bevern and his wife, Landgravine Christine of Hesse-Eschwege. On 1 May 1706, he became a colonel in the Prussian army. In December of that year he succeeded his twin brother, Ferdinand Christian (d. 1706) as provost of the chapters of St. Blaise and St. Cyriakus in Brunswick.

On 1 March 1735, his elder brother, Duke Ferdinand Albert II of Brunswick-Bevern inherited Brunswick-Wolfenbüttel. Ferdinand Albert II then gave Brunswick-Bevern to Ernest Ferdinand as an apanage.

Ernest Ferdinand died in Brunswick in 1746. He was the founder of the younger Brunswick-Bevern line, which died out with the death of his son Frederick Charles Ferdinand in 1809

== Marriage and issue ==
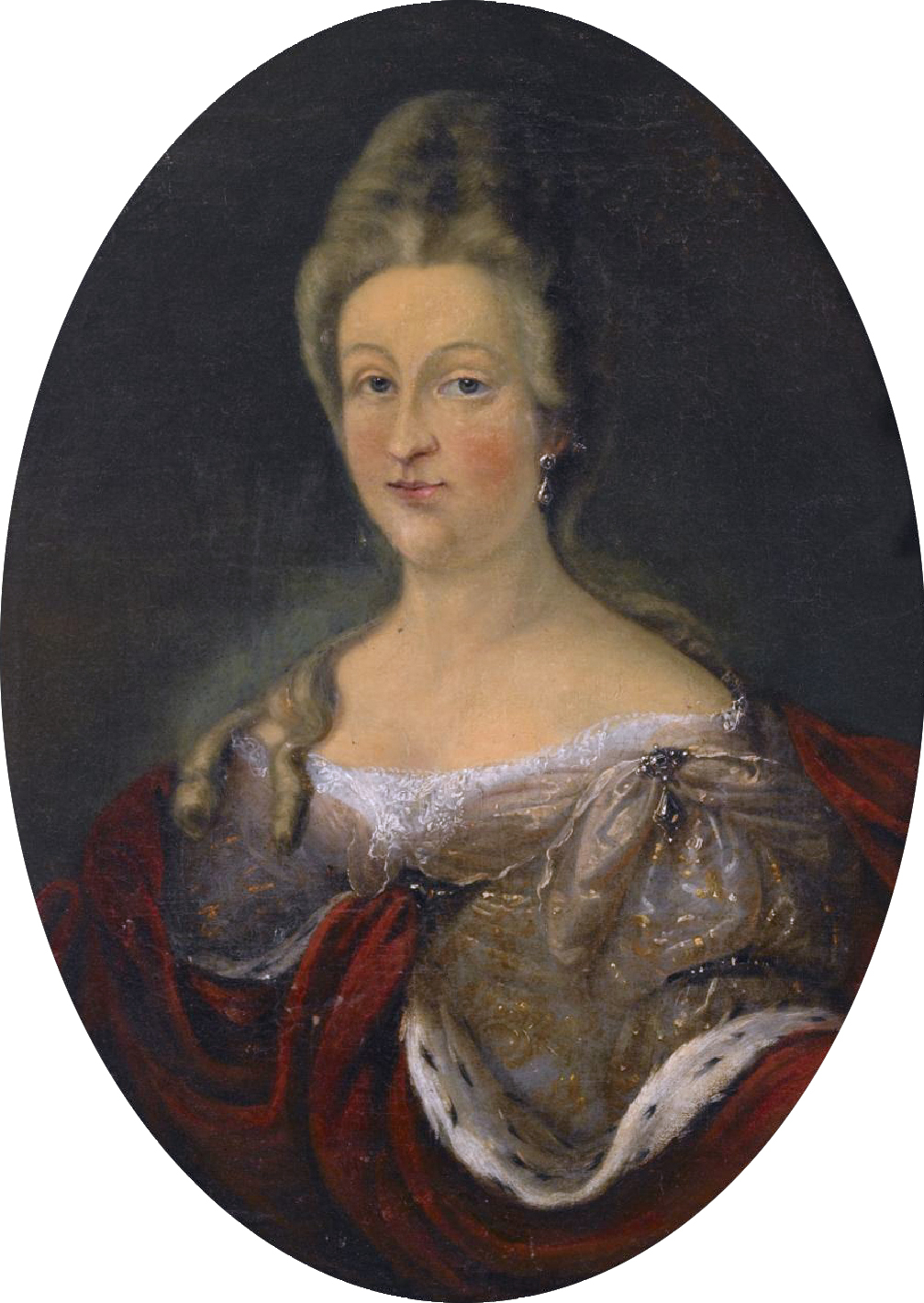
Eleonore Charlotte of Courland (1686-1748).

On 4 August 1714, he married Eleonore Charlotte of Courland (1686-1748), daughter of Frederick Casimir Kettler, with whom he had thirteen children:

- August William (1715-1781)
- Christine Sophie (22 January 1717 - 26 March 1779), married Margrave Frederick Ernest of Brandenburg-Kulmbach (1703-1762)
- Frederica (August 29 1719 - 19 December 1772), never married, no issue.
- George Louis (16 April 1721 - 28 October 1747), father of Danish courtesan Støvlet-Cathrine Benthagen, he had no further issue.
- Ernestine (16 April 1721) died at birth.
- George Frederick (18 April 1723 - 15 June 1766) died unmarried without issue.
- Amalia (1 December 1724 - 30 January 1726) died in early childhood.
- Charles William (9 January 1725) died at birth.
- Frederick August (7 March 1726 - 1 June 1729) died in early childhood.
- Anne Marie (26 May 1728 - 12 March 1754) died unmarried, without issue.
- Frederick Charles Ferdinand (1729-1809), Danish Marshal
- John Charles (5 April 1731 - 5 May 1732) died in early childhood.

== Ancestors ==
Ancestors of Ernest Ferdinand, Duke of Brunswick-Wolfenbüttel-Bevern

16. Ernest I, Duke of Brunswick-Lüneburg
8. Henry III, Duke of Brunswick-Lüneburg
17. Sophia of Mecklenburg-Schwerin
4. Augustus the Younger, Duke of Brunswick-Lüneburg
18. Francis I, Duke of Saxe-Lauenburg
9. Ursula of Saxe-Lauenburg
19. Sibylle of Saxony
2. Ferdinand Albert I, Duke of Brunswick-Lüneburg
20. John V, Duke of Mecklenburg-Schwerin
10. John Albert II, Duke of Mecklenburg-Güstrow
21. Sophia of Schleswig-Holstein-Gottorp
5. Elisabeth Sophie of Mecklenburg-Güstrow
22. Christopher, Duke of Mecklenburg
11. Elisabeth of Mecklenburg-Gadebusch
23. Princess Elizabeth of Sweden
1. Ernest Ferdinand, Duke of Brunswick-Lüneburg
24. William IV, Landgrave of Hesse-Kassel (or Hesse-Cassel)
12. Maurice, Landgrave of Hesse-Kassel (or Hesse-Cassel)
25. Sabine of Württemberg
6. Frederick, Landgrave of Hesse-Eschwege
26. John VII, Count of Nassau-Siegen
13. Juliane of Nassau-Siegen
27. Magdalene of Waldeck-Wildungen
3. Christina Wilhelmina of Hesse-Eschwege
28. John I, Count Palatine of Zweibrücken
14. John Casimir, Count Palatine of Kleeburg
29. Magdalene of Jülich-Cleves-Berg
7. Countess Palatine Eleonora Catherine of Zweibrücken
30. Charles IX of Sweden
15. Catherine of Sweden
31. Maria of the Palatinate-Simmern

Ernest Ferdinand, Duke of Brunswick-Wolfenbüttel-Bevern House of Guelph Born: 4 March 1682 Died: 14 April 1746
Preceded by Ferdinand Albert II	Duke of Brunswick-Bevern; 1735-1746	Succeeded by August William
