= Frederick Charles Ferdinand, Duke of Brunswick-Wolfenbüttel-Bevern =

Field Marshall, Duke of Brunswick-Wolfenbüttel-Bevern

Frederick Charles Ferdinand, Duke of Brunswick-Lüneburg
- Born: 5 April 1729; Brunswick
- Died: 27 April 1809 (aged 80); Glücksburg
- Spouse: Anna Caroline of Nassau-Saarbrücken (m. 1782)
- House: House of Guelph
- Father: Ernest Ferdinand, Duke of Brunswick-Lüneburg
- Mother: Eleanor Charlotte of Courland

Frederick Charles Ferdinand, Duke of Brunswick-Lüneburg (5 April 1729 in Brunswick – 27 April 1809 in Glücksburg), was a member of the House of Guelph. He was a Danish field marshal and also the last Duke of Brunswick-Bevern.

== Life ==
He was the son of Duke Ernest Ferdinand of Brunswick-Bevern (1682–1746) and his wife, Eleanor Charlotte of Courland. In 1742, he entered the Dutch army as captain and fought two campaigns in 1745 and 1746. He then switched to the Brunswick army and also served as a volunteer in the imperial army. Under the guidance of his uncle Louis Ernest, he commanded the Both'sche regiment during the War of the Austrian Succession. After the Treaty of Aix-la-Chapelle (1748), returned to the Dutch army, where he was promoted to Major General in 1754.

After the outbreak of the Seven Years' War, he travelled to Dresden at the end of 1756, where King Frederick II of Prussia gave him command of the Saxon infantry regiment Prince Xaver. However, his soldiers mutinied and ran away and King Frederick held Frederick Charles Ferdinand responsible. He left the Prussian army in 1759 and joined the British army. He fought in the Battle of Minden on 1 August 1759 under his cousin Ferdinand. He then joined the Danish army, where he was promoted to Lieutenant General in 1761 and to Command of the Guards on Foot in 1762 and to Inspector General of the Infantry in 1764. In 1766, he was appointed governor of Rendsburg and in 1773 governor of Copenhagen.

In 1781, his elder brother August William died and Frederick Charles Ferdinand inherited Brunswick-Bevern and became provost of St. Blaise and the St. Cyriacus Abbey in Brunswick. However, with permission of the King of Denmark, who promoted him to field marshal in 1782, he took up residence in Glücksburg Castle.

On 26 October 1782, he married Princess Anna Caroline (1751–1824), the daughter of Prince William Henry of Nassau-Saarbrücken and the widow of Duke Frederick Henry William of Schleswig-Holstein-Glücksburg.

In 1793, he created a foundation for poor relief in his capital Bevern. After Brunswick was occupied by Napoleon's troops in 1806, he took in the sons of Duke Charles William Ferdinand, Duke of Brunswick-Wolfenbüttel.

Frederick Charles Ferdinand died childless in 1809. With his death, the Brunswick-Bevern line died out, and Brunswick-Bevern fell back to Brunswick-Wolfenbüttel.

== Ancestors ==
Ancestors of Frederick Charles Ferdinand, Duke of Brunswick-Wolfenbüttel-Bevern

16. Henry, Duke of Brunswick-Lüneburg
8. Augustus the Younger, Duke of Brunswick-Wolfenbüttel
17. Ursula of Saxe-Lauenburg
4. Ferdinand Albert I, Duke of Brunswick-Lüneburg
18. John Albert II, Duke of Mecklenburg
9. Elisabeth Sophie of Mecklenburg
19. Elisabeth of Mecklenburg-Gadebusch
2. Ernest Ferdinand, Duke of Brunswick-Lüneburg
20. Maurice, Landgrave of Hesse-Kassel
10. Frederick, Landgrave of Hesse-Eschwege
21. Juliane of Nassau-Siegen
5. Christine of Hesse-Eschwege
22. John Casimir, Count Palatine of Kleeburg
11. Countess Palatine Eleonora Catherine of Zweibrücken
23. Catherine of Sweden
1. Frederick Charles Ferdinand, Duke of Brunswick-Lüneburg
24. Wilhelm Kettler
12. Jacob Kettler
25. Duchess Sophie of Prussia
6. Frederick Casimir Kettler
26. George William, Elector of Brandenburg
13. Margravine Louise Charlotte of Brandenburg
27. Elisabeth Charlotte of the Palatinate, Electress of Brandenburg
3. Eleanor Charlotte of Courland
28. John VII, Count of Nassau-Siegen
14. Henry of Nassau-Siegen
29. Margaret, daughter of John II of Schleswig-Holstein-Sonderburg
7. Countess Sophie Amalie of Nassau-Siegen
30. Georg Ernst of Limburg Stirum
15. Mary Magdalene of Limburg-Stirum
31. Magdalena, daughter of Arnols III of Bentheim

Frederick Charles Ferdinand, Duke of Brunswick-Wolfenbüttel-Bevern House of Guelph Born: 5 April 1729 Died: 27 April 1809
Preceded by August William	Duke of Brunswick-Bevern; 1781-1809	Succeeded by Frederick William as Duke of Brunswick- Wolfenbüttel
