= Auguste Louise of Württemberg-Oels =

Duchess consort of Saxe-Weisselfels-Barby
- Tenure: 1728-1732
- Born: 21 January 1698; Bernstadt
- Died: 4 January 1739 (aged 40); Skarsine Castle, Silesia
- Spouse: George Albert, Duke of Saxe-Weissenfels-Barby
- House: Württemberg
- Father: Christian Ulrich I
- Mother: Sophie Wilhelmine of East Frisia

Auguste Louise of Württemberg-Oels (21 January 1698 - 4 January 1739), was a Duchess of Württemberg-Oels by birth and by marriage Duchess of Saxe-Weissenfels-Barby.

== Biography ==
Born in Bernstadt (now called Bierutów), the capital of the Duchy of Bernstadt in Silesia, she was the only child of Duke Christian Ulrich I of Württemberg-Oels and his third wife, Princess Sophie Wilhelmine of Ostfriesland (1659-1698), a daughter of Enno Louis, Prince of East Frisia.

Her mother died fourteen days after her birth (4 February 1698), probably from childbirth complications. From her father's two previous marriages, Auguste Louise had fourteen older half-siblings, of whom only four survive adulthood: Louise Elisabeth (by marriage Duchess of Saxe-Merseburg-Lauchstädt), Sophie Angelika (by marriage Duchess of Saxe-Zeitz-Pegau-Neustadt) -both born from Christian Ulrich I's first marriage with Anna Elisabeth of Anhalt-Bernburg-, Charles Frederick II, Duke of Württemberg-Oels and Christian Ulrich II, Duke of Württemberg-Wilhelminenort -both born from Christian Ulrich I's second marriage with Sibylle Maria of Saxe-Merseburg-.

== Personal life ==
In Forst on 18 February 1721, Auguste Louise married George Albert, Hereditary Prince of Saxe-Weissenfels-Barby. Only eight years later, in 1728, George Albert inherited the paternal domains.

The union, completely unhappy and childless, ended in divorce in 1732. Auguste Louise retired to Skarsine Castle in Silesia, where she died aged 40, and five months before her former husband. She was buried in the Schloss Stadtkirche St.Johannis, Oels.

Auguste Louise of Württemberg-Oels House of Württemberg Born: 21 January 1698 Died: 4 January 1739
German royalty
Vacant Title last held by Elisabeth Albertine of Anhalt-Dessau	Duchess consort of Saxe-Weissenfels-Barby; 1728-1732	Duchy reincorporated to Saxe-Weissenfels
