= Ferdinand Albert =

Ferdinand Albert may refer to:

- Ferdinand Albert I, Duke of Brunswick-Lüneburg (1636 – 1687), relative of the princes of Brunswick-Wolfenbüttel
- Ferdinand Albert II, Duke of Brunswick-Wolfenbüttel (1680 – 1735), Holy Roman Empire army officer; prince of Wolfenbüttel
