= Eleanor of Sweden =

Eleanor of Sweden (Swedish: Eleonora) may refer to:

- Countess Palatine Eleonora Catherine of Zweibrücken (1626 – 1692), Swedish princess 1654
- Maria Eleonora of Brandenburg (1599–1655), Swedish queen 1620
- Hedvig Eleonora of Holstein-Gottorp (1636–1715), Swedish queen 1654
- Ulrika Eleonora of Denmark (1656–1693), Swedish queen 1680
- Ulrika Eleonora, Queen of Sweden (1688–1741), Swedish queen regnant 1718
