= Frederick of Brunswick-Lüneburg =

Frederick of Brunswick-Lüneburg may refer to:

- Frederick I, Duke of Brunswick-Lüneburg (c. 1357–1400)
- Frederick II, Duke of Brunswick-Lüneburg (1418–1478), also called Frederick the Pious
- Frederick III, Duke of Brunswick-Lüneburg (1424–1495), also called Frederick the Restless
- Frederick IV, Duke of Brunswick-Lüneburg (1574–1648)
- Frederick Ulrich, Duke of Brunswick-Wolfenbüttel (1591–1634)
- Frederick Charles Ferdinand, Duke of Brunswick-Lüneburg (1729–1809)
- Frederick William, Duke of Brunswick-Wolfenbüttel (1771–1815)
