= Albrecht of Saxe-Weissenfels =

German prince

Albrecht of Saxe-Weissenfels (14 April 1659 in Halle – 9 May 1692 in Leipzig), was a German prince of the House of Wettin. He was the fifth and youngest son of August, Duke of Saxe-Weissenfels, and his first wife, Anna Maria of Mecklenburg-Schwerin.

== Life ==
By the will of his father (1680), Albrecht only received an income from his older brother's lands. Without lands of his own, he spend most of his time with his wife's relatives in Wertheim and converted to Catholicism.

As a member of the Fruitbearing Society, he received the surname der Muntere (the cheerful one).

In Wertheim on 22 June 1687, Albrecht married Christine Therese of Löwenstein-Wertheim-Rochefort. They had two daughters:

1. Anna Christine (b. Wertheim, 17 July 1690 – d. Vienna, 5 March 1763) died unmarried and without issue.
2. Maria Auguste (b. Wertheim, 4 February 1692 – d. Wertheim, 15 February 1692) died in infancy.
