= Saxe-Weissenfels =

Duchy of the Holy Roman Empire

Duchy of Saxe-Weissenfels Herzogtum Sachsen-Weißenfels (German)
- 1656–1746
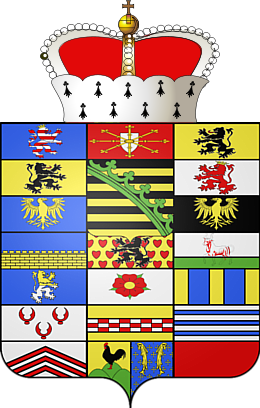
- Coat of arms

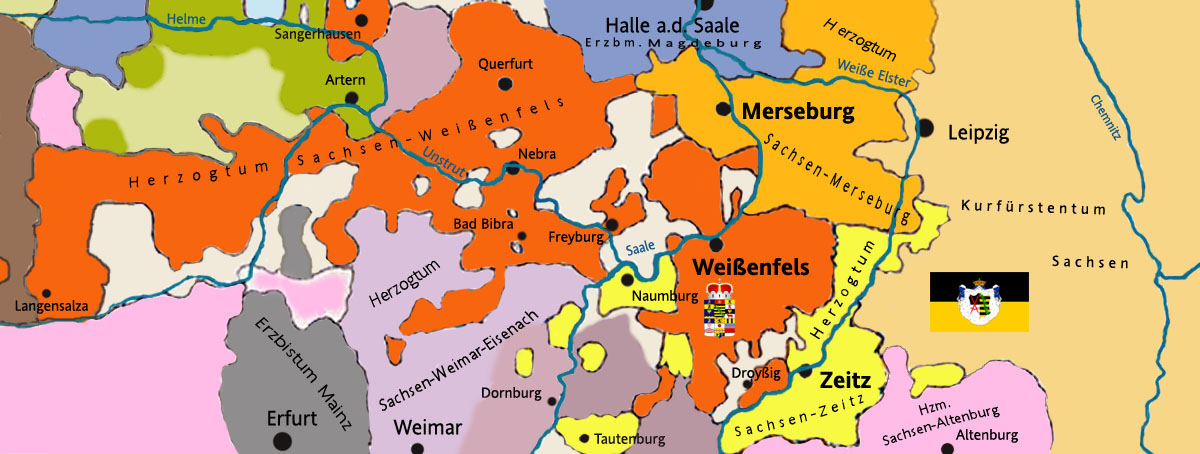
- Territory of the Duchy of Saxony-Weissenfels 1657 (orange)

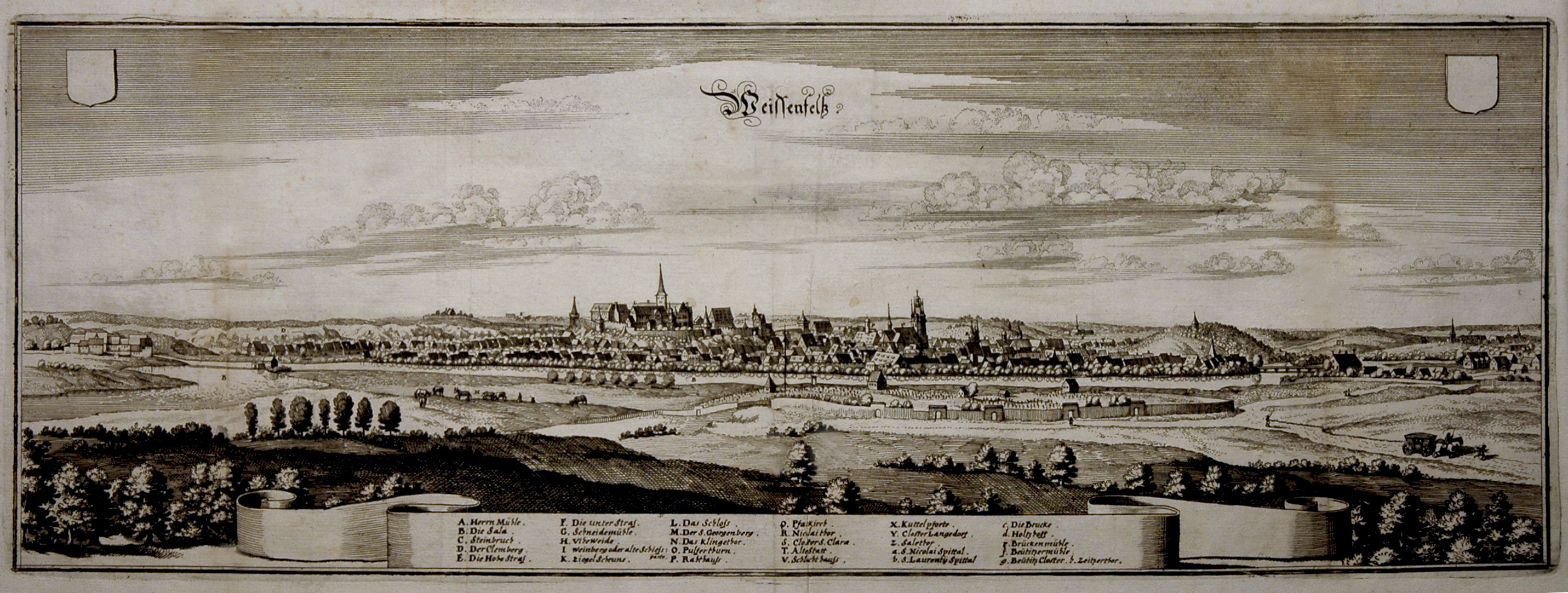
- Weißenfels around 1647, copperplate engraving by Matthäus Merian, 1647
- Status: State of the Holy Roman Empire
- Capital: Weißenfels
- Government: Monarchy
- Duke
  - 1656–1680: August
  - 1680–1697: Johann Adolf I
  - 1697–1712: Johann Georg
  - 1712–1736: Christian
  - 1736–1746: Johann Adolf II
- Historical era: Early modern Europe
  - Death of elector Johann Georg I: 8 October 1656
  - Ducal line extinct: 16 May 1746
Preceded by	Succeeded by
Electorate of Saxony	Electorate of Saxony
- Today part of: Germany

Saxe-Weissenfels (German: Sachsen-Weißenfels) was a Duchy of the Holy Roman Empire from 1656 until 1746 with its residence at Weißenfels. Ruled by a cadet branch of the Albertine House of Wettin, the duchy passed to the Electorate of Saxony upon the extinction of the line.

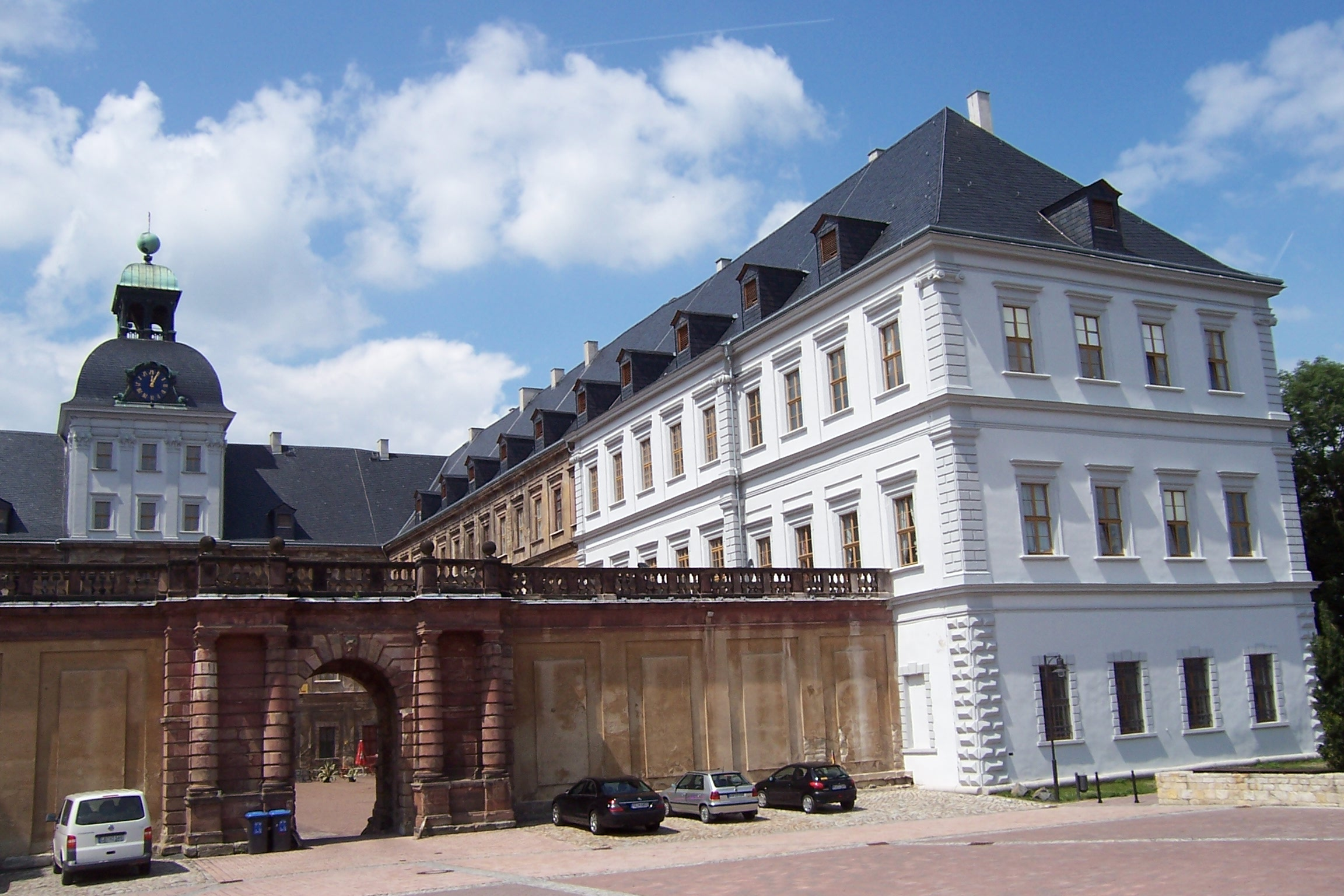
Neu-Augustusburg Castle, Weissenfels

John George I of Wettin, Saxon prince-elector from 1611 to 1656, had disposed in his testament that while his eldest son John George II would succeed him as elector, his younger brothers should be vested with secundogeniture duchies as an appanage. Therefore, upon his death the Duchies of Saxe-Zeitz, Saxe-Merseburg and Saxe-Weissenfels arose, the latter was granted to the second eldest son Augustus, who already served as the Protestant administrator of the Archbishopric of Magdeburg since 1638, then residing at Halle. From about 1660 he had the Baroque Neu-Augustusburg residence built at Weissenfels.

Beside Weissenfels the duchy comprised the ämter of Freyburg, Sachsenburg (present-day Oldisleben), Sangerhausen, Eckartsberga, Weißensee and Langensalza. Duke Augustus enlarged its territory by several lordships originally held by the Magdeburg archbishops and adjudicated to Saxony by the 1635 Peace of Prague, including the immediate lordship of Querfurt as well as the exclaves of Jüterbog, Dahme and Burg.

By Querfurt, the ducal Saxe-Weissenfels line gained the status of an Imperial State (at times called Saxe-Querfurt) and member of the Upper Saxon Circle, though without a vote in the Reichstag. In 1659 Augustus also acquired the County of Barby, which upon his death in 1680 was granted to his younger son Heinrich. He built the new baroque castle at Barby from 1687. Augustus eldest son and successor Duke Johann Adolf I sold Burg to Brandenburg in 1687.

George Frideric Handel's father Georg Händel from 1657 on served as a physician to Duke Augustus of Saxe-Weissenfels, the composer himself was born in the former ducal residence of Halle. According to legend it was Duke Johan Adolf I admiring George Frederic's performance on the church organ of Neu-Augustusburg Castle, who promoted his musical career. In 1713 Johann Sebastian Bach dedicated his cantata Was mir behagt, ist nur die muntre Jagd, BWV 208 to Christian of Saxe-Weissenfels in celebration of the duke's 31st birthday, it was first performed at the ducal Neuenburg Castle at Freyburg.

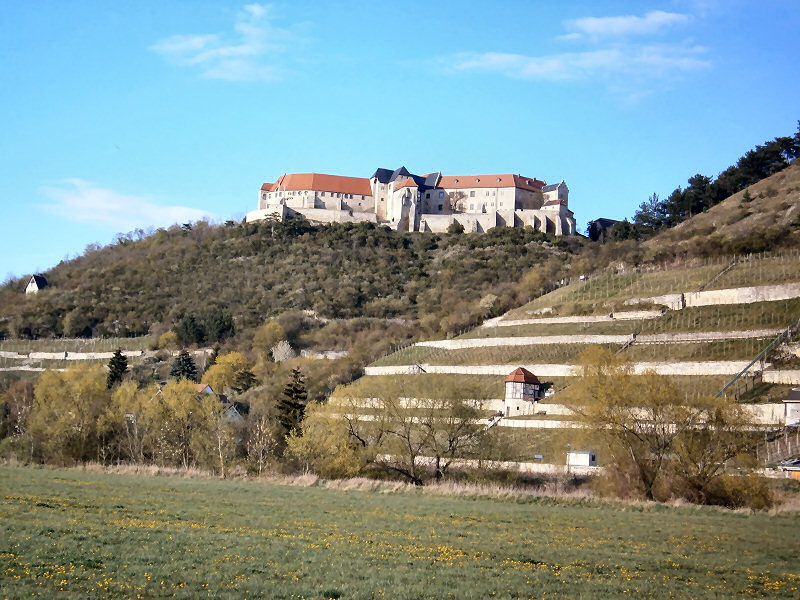
Neuenburg Castle at Freyburg

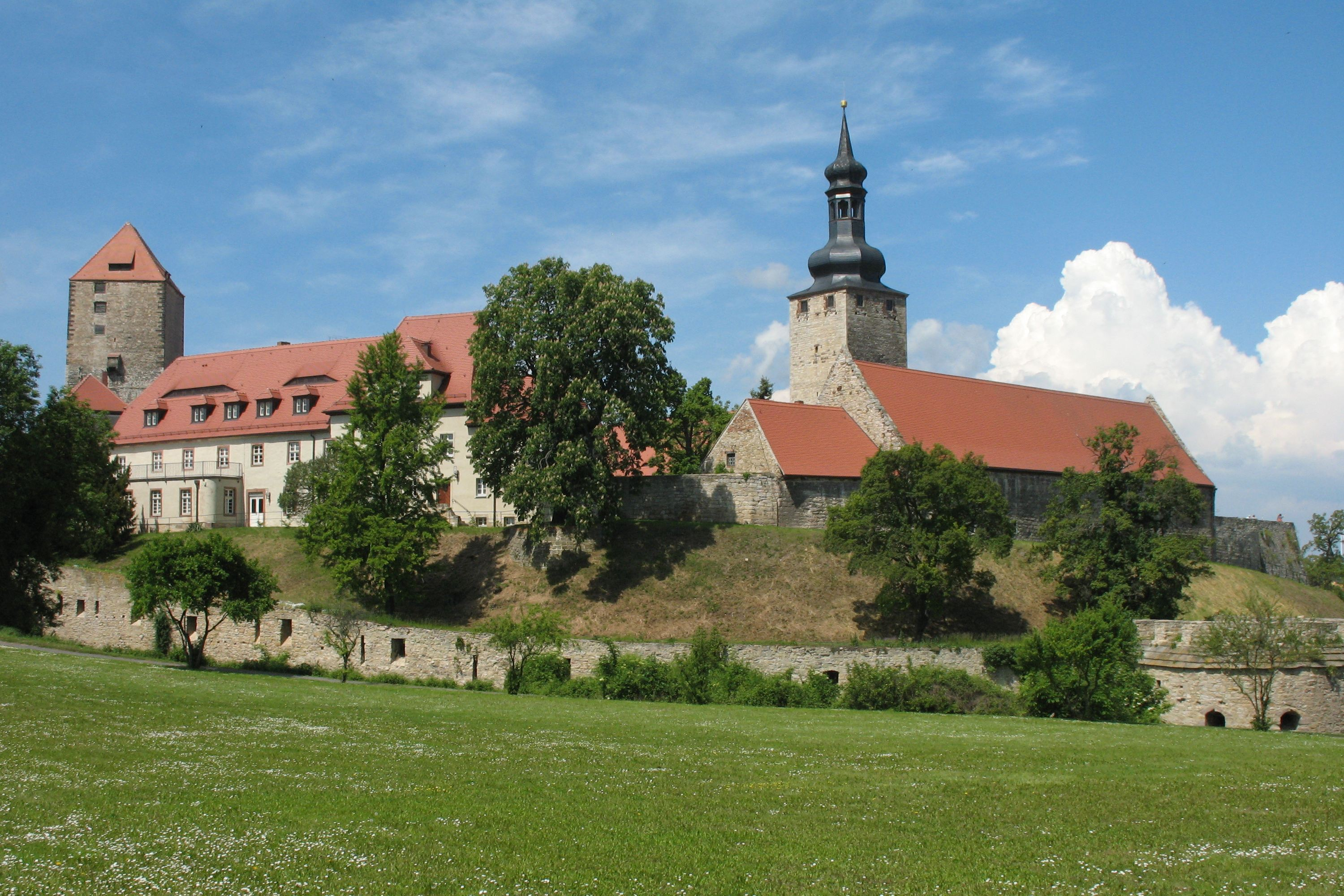
Querfurt Castle

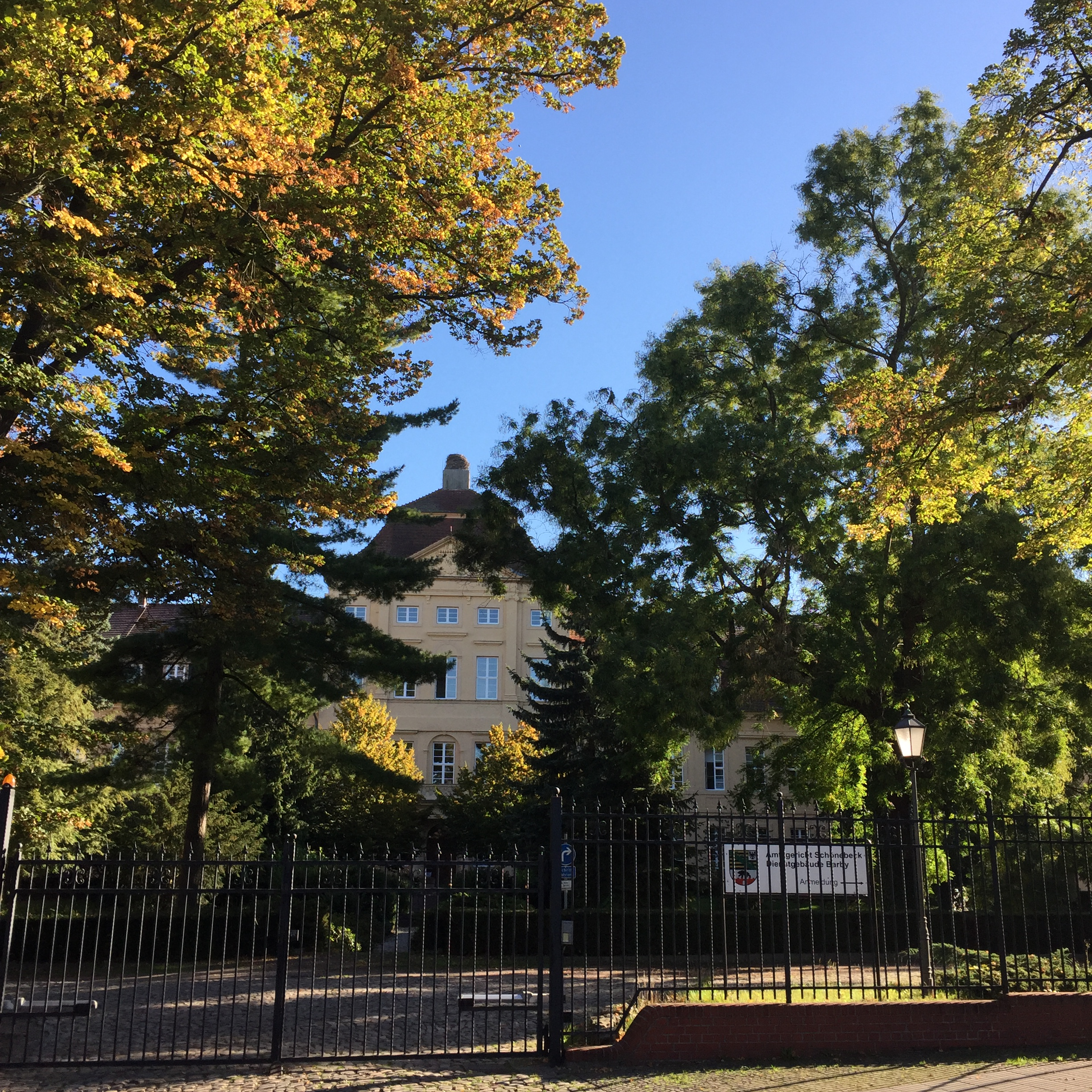
Barby Castle

== Dukes of Saxe-Weissenfels ==
- Augustus (1656–80), son of Elector John George I of Saxony, also administrator of Magdeburg since 1638, Count of Barby from 1659

Saxe-Weissenfels-Querfurt

- Johann Adolf I (1680–97), son of Augustus
- Johann Georg (1697–1712), son
- Christian (1712–1736), brother
- Johann Adolf II (1736–1746), brother

Saxe-Weissenfels-Barby

- Heinrich (1680–1728), son of Augustus
- Georg Albrecht (1728–1739), son

Line extinct, fell back to the electoral House of Wettin.
