= Anna Maria of Mecklenburg-Schwerin =

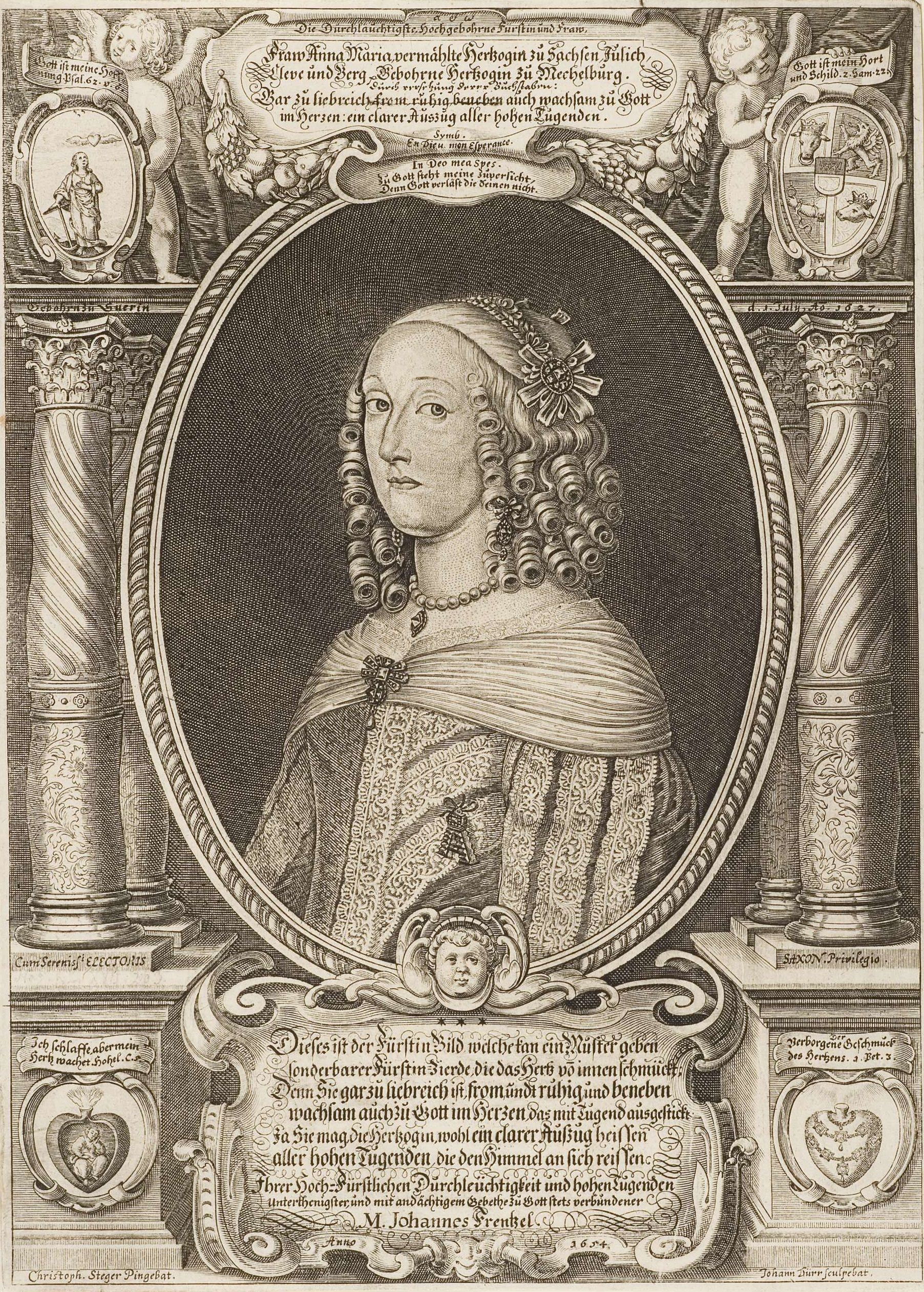
- Engraving by Johannes Frentzel, 1654.

Duchess consort of Saxe-Weisselfels
- Tenure: 1657–1669
- Born: 1 July 1627; Schwerin
- Died: 11 December 1669 (aged 42); Halle
- Spouse: Augustus, Duke of Saxe-Weissenfels
- Issue: Magdalene Sibylle, Duchess of Saxe-Gotha-Altenburg; Johann Adolf I, Duke of Saxe-Weissenfels; Prince Augustus; Prince Christian; Princess Anna Maria; Sophie, Princess of Anhalt-Zerbst; Christine, Princess of Holstein-Gottorp; Henry, Count of Barby; Prince Albert
- House: Mecklenburg
- Father: Adolf Frederick I, Duke of Mecklenburg-Schwerin
- Mother: Anna Maria of Ostfriesland

Anna Maria of Mecklenburg-Schwerin (1 July 1627 – 11 December 1669) was a German noblewoman, a member of the House of Mecklenburg and by marriage Duchess of Saxe-Weissenfels.

She was the fourth child and second daughter of Adolf Frederick I, Duke of Mecklenburg-Schwerin, and his first wife Anna Maria, daughter of Enno III, Count of Ostfriesland. In older historiography, she appears with a third name, Dorothea, but modern historians have discarded it.

== Life ==
The wars involving Mecklenburg forced her father to send Anna Maria and her two older brothers, Christian Louis and Karl, first to Sweden and shortly afterwards to Denmark, to the court of Dowager Queen Sophia (born Duchess of Mecklenburg-Güstrow). In 1629 Anna Maria was sent to Saxony with Dowager Electress Hedwig, to the latter's dower state, Castle Lichtenberg near Prettin, where she was educated. After Hedwig's death in 1642, Anna Maria returned to Schwerin, where she was reunited with her father, her mother having died in 1634. She also probably then met for the first time her stepmother, Marie Katharina of Brunswick-Dannenberg, and her three surviving half-siblings. Anna Maria was her father's favorite child as demonstrated by the cordial, even affectionate tone of the letters that they wrote to each other.

On 23 November 1647, in Schwerin, Anna Maria married Augustus, second surviving son of Johann Georg I, Elector of Saxony, and moved with her husband to Halle, the main city of his domains as Administrator of the Archbishopric of Magdeburg. During her marriage, she bore twelve children, including three daughters who died in infancy in 1663.

On 22 April 1657 her husband, by the terms of his father's will, received the towns of Weissenfels and Querfurt as his own Duchy, and hence Anna Maria became Duchess consort of Saxe-Weissenfels.

Anna Maria died on 11 December 1669 in Halle and was buried in a magnificent coffin in the Schloss Neu-Augustusburg in Weissenfels. Her three infant daughters who had been buried in the Halle Cathedral were reinterred with her.

== Issue ==
In Schwerin on 23 November 1647 Anna Maria married Augustus, Duke of Saxe-Weissenfels. They had twelve children:

1. Magdalene Sibylle (b. Halle, 2 September 1648 – d. Gotha, 7 January 1681), married on 14 November 1669 to Duke Frederick I of Saxe-Gotha-Altenburg.
2. Johann Adolf I (b. Halle, 2 November 1649 – d. Weissenfels, 24 May 1697).
3. August (b. Halle, 3 December 1650 – d. Halle, 11 August 1674), Provost of Magdeburg; married on 25 August 1673 to Charlotte of Hesse-Eschwege. Their only son was stillborn (24 April 1674).
4. Christian (b. Halle, 25 January 1652 – killed in action at Mainz, 24 August 1689), General Field Marshal of the Saxon Electoral Army.
5. Anna Maria (b. Halle, 28 February 1653 – d. Halle, 17 February 1671).
6. Sophie (b. Halle, 23 June 1654 – d. Zerbst, 31 March 1724), married on 18 June 1676 to Karl, Prince of Anhalt-Zerbst.
7. Katharine (b. Halle, 12 September 1655 – d. Halle, 21 April 1663).
8. Christine (b. Halle, 25 August 1656 – d. Eutin, 27 April 1698), married on 21 June 1676 to August Friedrich of Holstein-Gottorp, Prince-Bishop of Lübeck (son of Frederick III, Duke of Holstein-Gottorp, and his wife Duchess Marie Elisabeth of Saxony). No issue.
9. Heinrich (b. Halle, 29 September 1657 – d. Barby, 16 February 1728); he inherited Barby.
10. Albrecht (b. Halle, 14 April 1659 – d. Leipzig, 9 May 1692).
11. Elisabeth (b. Halle, 25 August 1660 – d. Halle, 11 May 1663).
12. Dorothea (b. Halle, 17 December 1662 – d. Halle, 12 May 1663).

== Ancestry ==
Ancestors of Anna Maria of Mecklenburg-Schwerin

8. John Albert I, Duke of Mecklenburg-Güstrow and Schwerin
4. Johann V-VII, Duke of Mecklenburg-Schwerin
9. Anna Sophia of Prussia
2. Adolf Frederick I, Duke of Mecklenburg-Schwerin
10. Adolf, Duke of Holstein-Gottorp
5. Sophia of Holstein-Gottorp
11. Christine of Hesse
1. Anna Maria of Mecklenburg-Schwerin
12. Edzard II, Count of East Frisia
6. Enno III, Count of East Frisia
13. Katarina Vasa
3. Anna Maria of East Frisia
14. Adolf, Duke of Holstein-Gottorp (= 10)
7. Anna of Holstein-Gottorp
15. Christine of Hesse (= 11)

== Bibliography ==
- Dirk Schleinert. "Anna Maria von Mecklenburg (1627-1669) und August von Sachsen (1614-1680) und die Begründung des Hauses Sachsen-Weißenfels. Dynastische Beziehungen zwischen Mecklenburg und Kursachsen im 17. Jahrhundert", in Mecklenburgische Jahrbücher 123 (2008), 123-157.
- Klaus Gondermann. Die Mitglieder der Fruchtbringenden Gesellschaft 1617-1650: 527 Biographien. Leipzig 1985.
- 300 Jahre Schloß Neu-Augustusburg, 1660–1694 – Residenz der Herzöge von Sachsen-Weißenfels. Festschrift. Weissenfels (1994).
- Johann Christoph Dreyhaupt. Beschreibung des ... Saal-Creyses, insonderheit der Städte Halle. Halle 1749/1751 (so-called Dreyhaupt-Chronik).

Anna Maria of Mecklenburg-Schwerin House of Mecklenburg-Schwerin Cadet branch of the House of Mecklenburg Born: 1 July 1627 Died: 11 December 1669
German royalty
New title	Duchess consort of Saxe-Weissenfels; 1657-1669	Vacant Title next held by Johanna Walpurgis of Leiningen-Westerburg
