= Neuenburg Castle (Freyburg) =

Coordinates: 51°12′31″N 11°46′32″E

- Schloss Neuenburg
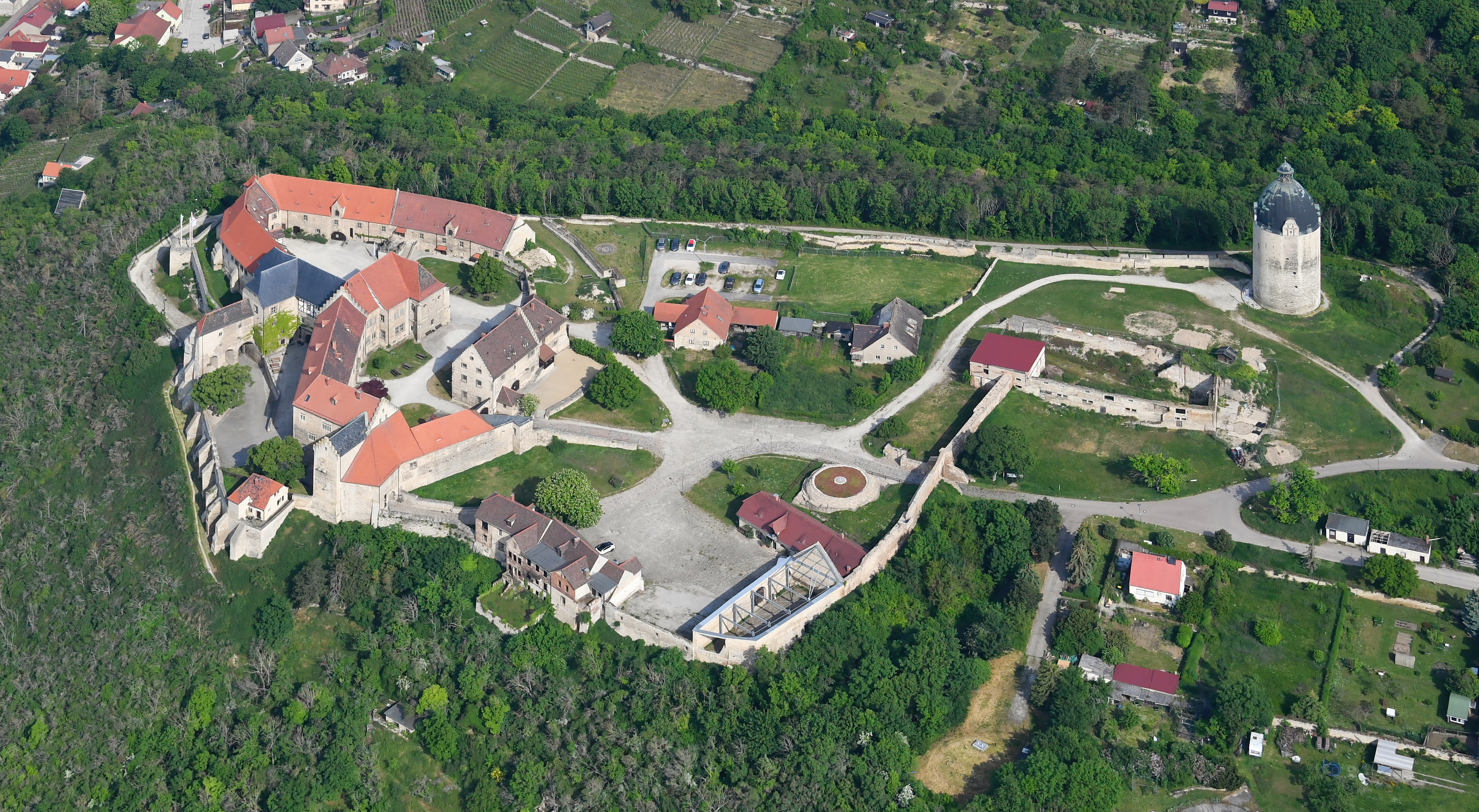
- Aerial view

- Location within Saxony-Anhalt Location within Germany

General information
- Type: hilltop castle
- Architectural style: Romanesque, Gothic and later additions
- Location: Freyburg, Saxony-Anhalt, Germany

Website
- Schloss-Neuenburg.de

Neuenburg Castle (German: Schloss Neuenburg) is a hilltop castle in the south of the German state of Saxony-Anhalt, on the spur-like foothills of a plateau above the eastern bank of the river Unstrut. Below the castle to the north lies the wine-growing town of Freyburg, which in turn is about seven kilometers north of Naumburg (Saale). The castle is a stop on the Romanesque Road, a route through the state of significant cultural and historic sites.The castle is owned and managed by the Saxony-Anhalt Cultural Foundation.

The castle was built around 1090 by the Thuringian count Ludwig der Springer, securing his territory in the east, as did its sister castle Wartburg in the west. The name Neuenburg derives from German for "new castle".

From 1656 until 1746 it was a secondary residence of the Dukes of Saxe-Weissenfels.

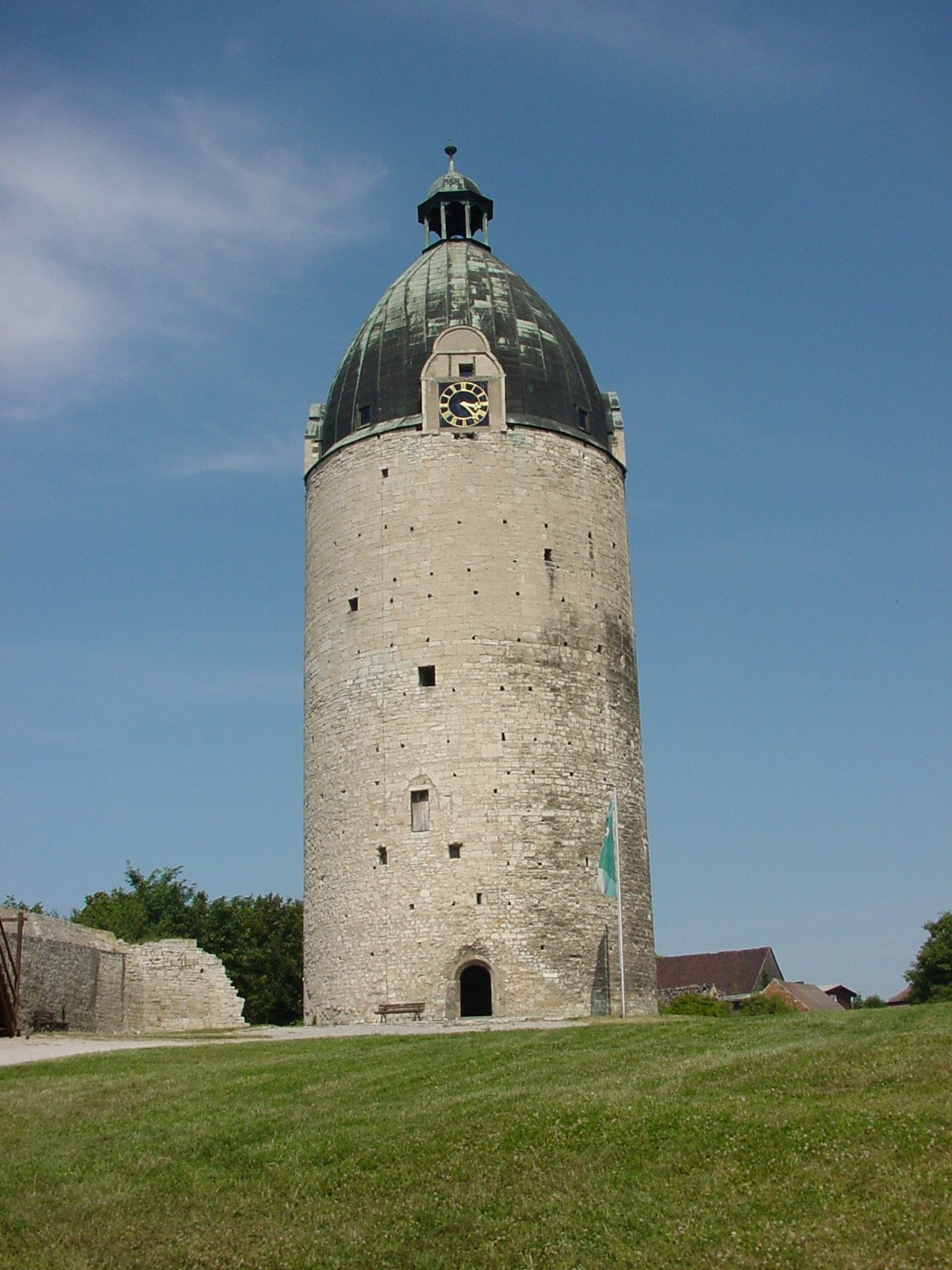
Bergfried known as Dicker Wilhelm (Fat William)

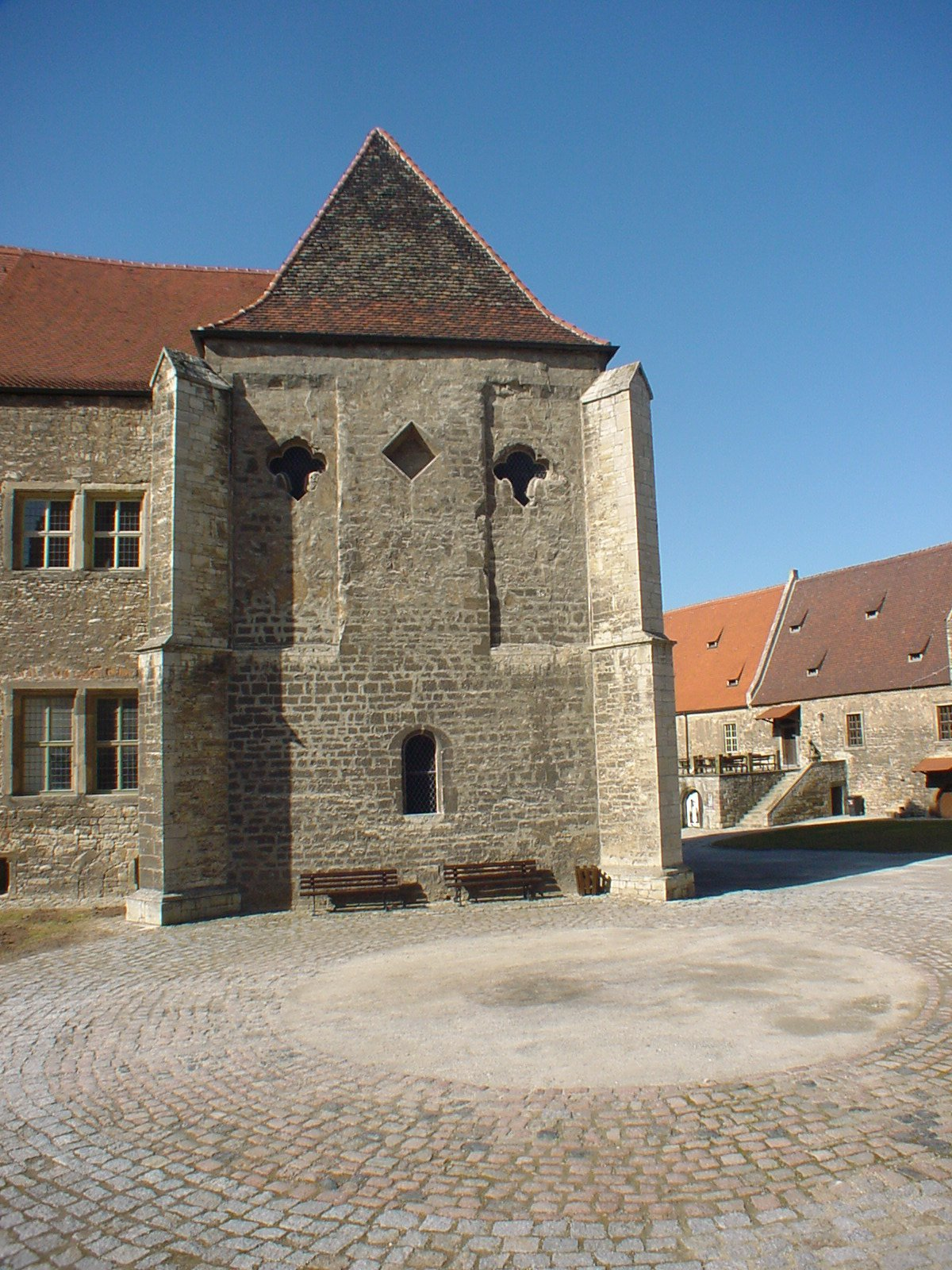
Double chapel
