= Princess Elisabeth Albertine of Anhalt-Dessau =

Elisabeth Albertine of Anhalt-Dessau
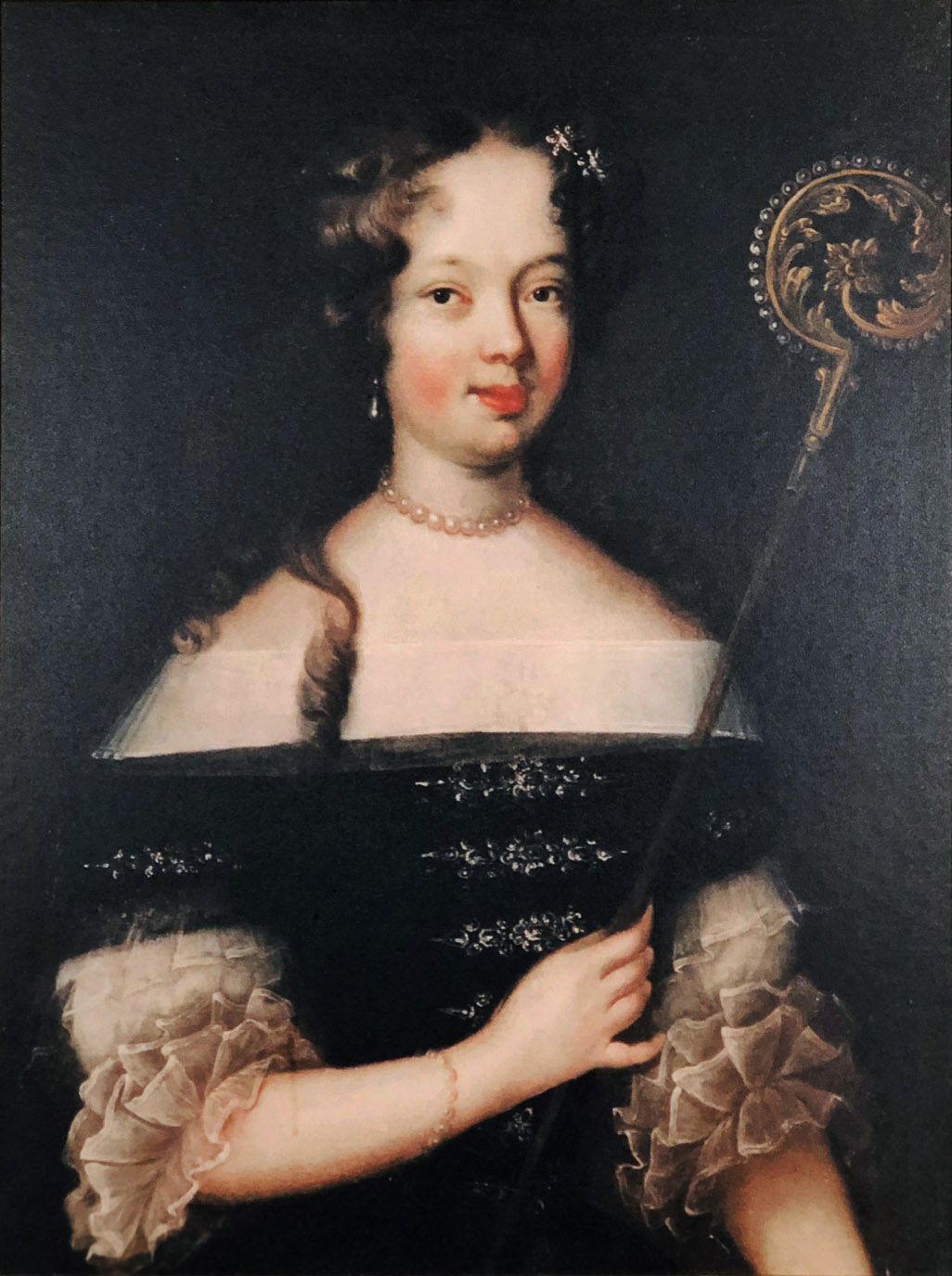
- Portrait as Princess-Abbess of Herford with crosier, ca. 1680–1685

Princess-Abbess of Herford
- Reign: 1680–1686

Duchess consort of Saxe-Weisselfels-Barby
- Tenure: 1686–1706
- Born: 1 May 1665; Cölln an der Spree
- Died: 5 October 1706 (aged 41); Dessau
- Spouse: Henry, Duke of Saxe-Weissenfels-Barby
- Issue: Frederick Henry, Hereditary Prince of Saxe-Weissenfels-Barby; George Albert, Duke of Saxe-Weissenfels-Barby; Princess Henriette Marie
- House: Ascania
- Father: John George II, Prince of Anhalt-Dessau
- Mother: Henriette Catherine of Orange-Nassau

Elisabeth Albertine of Anhalt-Dessau (1 May 1665 – 5 October 1706), was a German noblewoman by birth Princess of Anhalt-Dessau as member of the House of Ascania and by marriage Duchess of Saxe-Weissenfels-Barby.

Born in Cölln an der Spree, she was the fourth of ten children born from the marriage of John George II, Prince of Anhalt-Dessau and Henriette Catherine of Orange-Nassau. From her nine older and younger siblings, five survive adulthood: Henriette Amalie (by marriage Princess of Nassau-Dietz), Marie Eleonore (by marriage Princess Radziwiłł and Duchess of Olyka), Henriette Agnes, Leopold I, Prince of Anhalt-Dessau and Johanna Charlotte (by marriage Margravine of Brandenburg-Schwedt).

== Life ==
In 1680, and thanks to her father's instigation, Elisabeth Albertine was chosen Princess-Abbess of Herford Abbey as Elisabeth IV, securing with this the support of the Rhenish Imperial College prelate (German: Reichsprälatenkollegiums). She remained in the post for six years, until her marriage was arranged and moved to Barby; however, several Herford artists and merchants followed her.

In Dessau on 30 March 1686, Elisabeth Albertine married Henry, Duke of Saxe-Weissenfels-Barby. Elisabeth Albertine's paternal great-great grandmother was Agnes of Barby-Mühlingen; this give to Henry some blood ties to the extinct House of Barby.

The marriage produced eight children, of whom only three survive adulthood:

1. John August, Hereditary Prince of Saxe-Weissenfels-Barby (Dessau, 28 July 1687 – Dessau, 22 January 1688).
2. John August, Hereditary Prince of Saxe-Weissenfels-Barby (Dessau, 24 July 1689 – Dessau, 21 October 1689).
3. Stillborn twin sons (Dessau, 1690).
4. Frederick Henry, Hereditary Prince of Saxe-Weissenfels-Barby (Dessau, 2 July 1692 – The Hague, 21 November 1711).
5. George Albert, Duke of Saxe-Weissenfels-Barby (Dessau, 19 April 1695 – Barby, 12 June 1739).
6. Henriette Marie (Dessau, 1 March 1697 – Weissenfels, 10 August 1719).
7. Stillborn daughter (Dessau, 5 October 1706).

Elisabeth Albertine died in Dessau aged 41, following complications in her last childbirth. She was buried in the Familiengruft, Barby.

Princess Elisabeth Albertine of Anhalt-Dessau House of Ascania Born: 1 May 1665 Died: 5 October 1706
German royalty
new creation	Duchess consort of Saxe-Weissenfels-Barby; 1686–1706	Vacant Title next held by Auguste Louise of Württemberg-Oels
