= Frederick, Landgrave of Hesse-Eschwege =

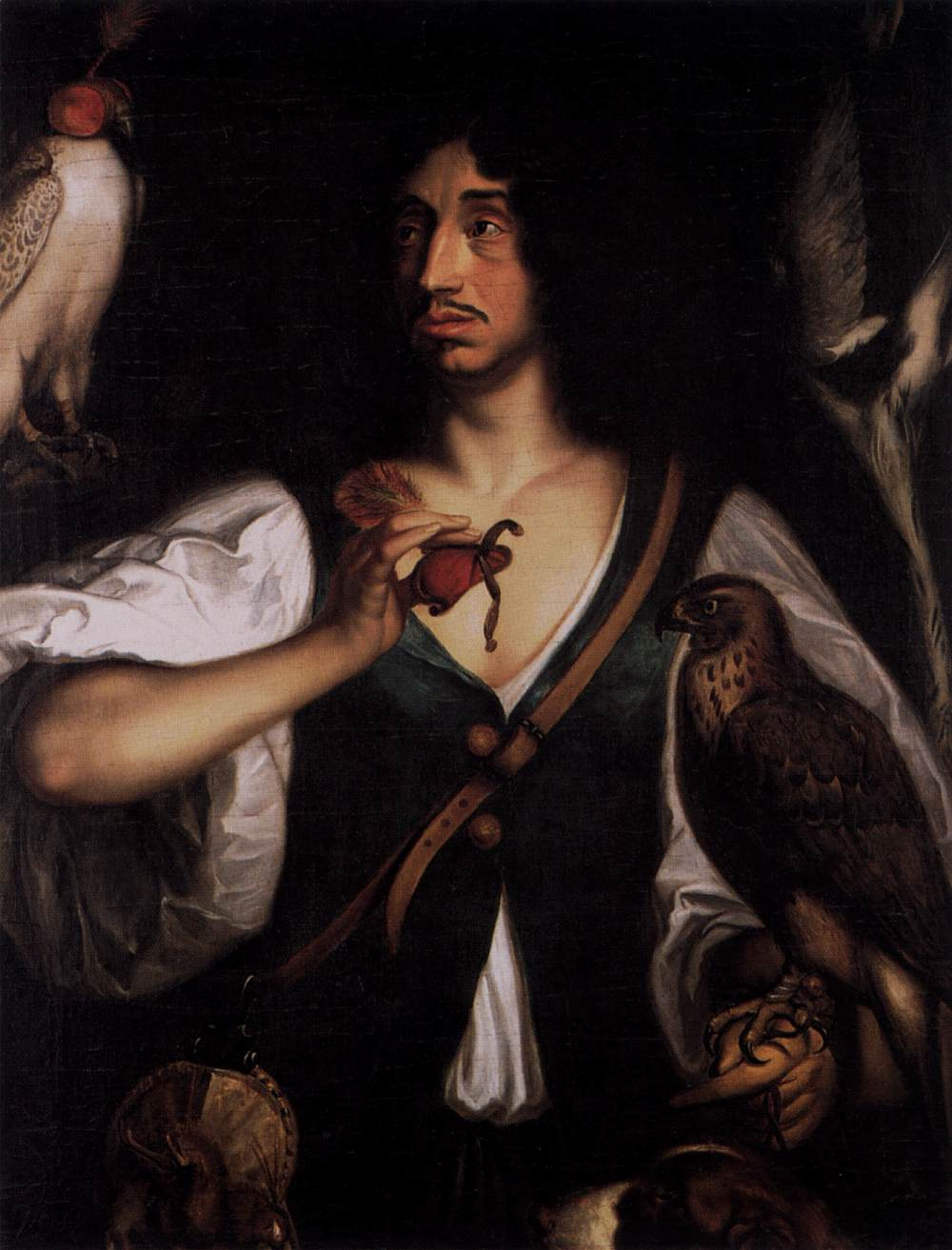
- Born: 9 May 1617; Kassel
- Died: 24 September 1655 (aged 38); Costian, near Poznań
- Buried: Market Church in Eschwege
- Noble family: House of Hesse
- Spouse: Countess Palatine Eleonora Catherine of Zweibrücken
- Issue Detail: Christine, Duchess of Brunswick-Wolfenbüttel-Bevern; Juliana, Baroness of Lilienburg; Charlotte, Countess of Bentheim-Tecklenburg
- Father: Maurice, Landgrave of Hesse-Kassel
- Mother: Juliane of Nassau-Siegen

Landgrave Frederick of Hesse-Eschwege (9 May 1617 – 24 September 1655) was from 1632 until his death Landgrave of the apanage of Hesse-Eschwege, which stood under the suzerainty of Hesse-Kassel.

== Background ==
Frederick was born in Kassel. As the eighth child of Landgrave Maurice of Hesse-Kassel, he was awarded Hesse-Eschwege by a decree of his father, which was imposed on his father by his eldest brother William V shortly before Maurice had to abdicate to avoid an impending bankruptcy. At the instigation of his second wife, Juliane of Nassau-Siegen, Maurice set aside a quarter of his country, the so-called Rotenburg Quarter, to be divided among his married sons. Of those, Herman IV received the Rotenburg area, Frederick received Eschwege and Ernest received the former Lower County of Katzenelnbogen, around Rheinfels Castle.

== Life ==
Maurice himself lived with his second family in Eschwege until his death in 1632. His widow then moved to Rotenburg Castle with her children.

The castle and town of Eschwege were pillaged and looted during the Thirty Years' War at Easter 1637. Thus, 20-year-old Frederick likely only moved into his residence at Eschwege after his marriage in 1646 in Stockholm with Eleonora Catherine, the sister of King Charles X Gustav of Sweden.

Frederick had a successful military career in the Swedish army, where he made it to the Major General. It is unknown whether he was active during the Thirty Years' War. During the Second Northern War, he commanded a Swedish battle group. Due to his military career, he spent much time at the Swedish court and rarely visited Eschwege. His three brothers ruled his share of the Rotenburg Quarter on his behalf. Even so, he cared about his subjects and contributed significantly to the reconstruction after the end of the Thirty Years' War. His wife mostly stayed in Eschwege and his children were born there.

== Death and legacy ==
Frederick died on 24 September 1655 in Costian near Poznań, Poland, during the Second Northern War, in the army of his brother-in-law Charles X Gustav of Sweden. He was buried in the Market Church in Eschwege; it took two years before his coffin arrived there.

Hesse-Eschwege fell to his brother Ernest of Hesse-Rheinfels. The castle in Eschwege was assigned to his widow as dower, but she retreated to her Swedish fief Osterholz near Bremen. She died in 1692 and was buried in the royal crypt in the Market Church in Eschwege. The castle in Eschwege was mortgaged to Brunswick-Bevern in 1667, to raise a dowry for his daughter Christina.

== Title ==
His full title, as immortalized on his coffin, was: Frederick, the brave hero, Landgrave of Hesse, Prince of Hersfeld, Count of Katzenelnbogen, Diez, Ziegenhain, Nidda and Schaumburg.

== Marriage and issue ==
Frederick married on 8 September 1646 in Stockholm with Eleonora Catherine (1626-1692), daughter of the Count Palatine John Casimir of Kleeburg (1589-1652) and sister of the Swedish king Charles X Gustav. They had the following children:

- Margarete (b. Erfurt, 31 March 1647 – d. Erfurt, 19 October 1647).
- Christine (b. Kassel, 30 October 1648 – d. Bevern, 18 March 1702), married in 1667 to Ferdinand Albert I, Duke of Brunswick-Lüneburg-Bevern.
- Elisabeth (b. Eschwege, 7 April 1650 – d. Eschwege, 27 April 1651).
- Juliana (b. Eschwege, 14 May 1652 – d. IJsselstein, 20 June 1693), married in 1680 Johann Jakob Marchand, Baron of Lilienburg (1656–1703)
- Charlotte (b. Eschwege, 3 September 1653 – d. Bremen, 7 February 1708), married firstly in 1673 with Prince August of Saxe-Weissenfels (son of Duke August) and secondly in 1679 with John Adolph, Count of Bentheim-Tecklenburg (divorced 1693)
- Frederick, Hereditary Prince of Hesse-Eschwege (b. Eschwege, 30 November 1654 – d. Eschwege, 27 July 1655).

== Sources and references ==
- Klaus Koniarek: Frederick, Landgrave of Hesse-Eschwege in Who was who in the Thirty Years' War
- Chronicle of Wanfried 2006 (unpublished)
- Hans-Günter Kielmann: Kleiner Führer durch die Rotenburger Quart 1627-1834 und das Fürstenhaus Hessen-Rotenburg, Rotenburg an der Fulda, 2002, ISBN 3-00-010155-1
- Kurt Holzapfel: Neues vom 'tollen Fritz'. Zu seinem 300. Todestag, in: Das Werraland, vol. 7, 1955, p. 43-44
- Kurt Holzapfel: Landgraf Friedrichs Ende. Gefallen 1655, beigesetzt in Eschwege 1657, in: Das Werraland, vol. 9, 1957, p. 36-39

Frederick, Landgrave of Hesse-Eschwege House of Hesse Born: 9 May 1617 Died: 24 September 1655
Preceded by Maurice as Landgrave of Hesse-Kassel	Landgrave of Hesse-Eschwege; 1632-1655	Succeeded by Ernest as Landgrave of Hesse-Rheinfels
