= Rosswald =

Swiss village

Coordinates: 46°18′15″N 8°02′27″E

Rosswald is a car-free village in the Swiss Alps, located in the canton of Valais. It lies in the eastern part of the canton, in the Simplon region, at an altitude of 1,819 metres. The village sits on a sunny terrace overlooking the Rhone valley, above Ried-Brig. The village is accessible via a cable car from the latter town.

Rosswald is a winter sports resort and includes a small ski area.

== Outdoor Activities ==
- Hiking: There are a number of hikes to choose from on the Rosswald mountain ridge.

== See also ==
- List of ski areas and resorts in Switzerland
