= Georg Albrecht of Saxe-Weissenfels, Count of Barby =

German prince (1695-1739)

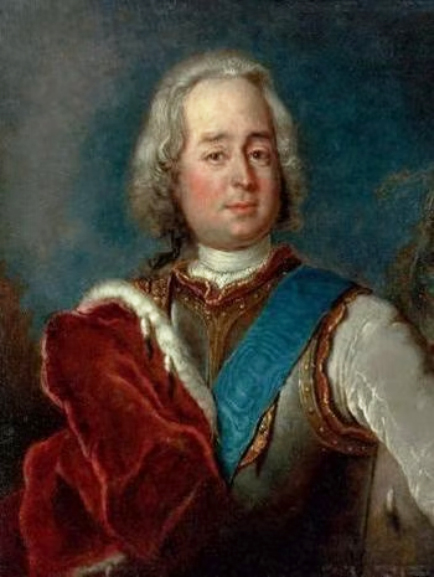
Portrait of Georg Albrecht attributed to Antoine Pesne, 1721

Georg Albrecht of Saxe-Weissenfels, Count of Barby (b. Dessau, 19 April 1695 – d. Barby, 12 June 1739), was a German prince of the House of Wettin and the last count of Barby.

He was the sixth (but second surviving) son of Heinrich of Saxe-Weissenfels, Count of Barby, and his wife, Princess Elisabeth Albertine of Anhalt-Dessau.

== Life ==
Before his own birth, two older brothers (both named Johann August and stillborn twins) had died. The death of his oldest surviving brother, the Hereditary Prince Frederick Heinrich, during a trip to The Hague (21 November 1711) made him the new heir of the county of Barby.

In Forst, Niederlausitz, on 18 February 1721, Georg Albrecht married Duchess Auguste Louise of Württemberg-Oels. Auguste's maternal grandmother was Countess Justine Sophie of Barby-Mühlingen (1636-1677), a sister of the last count; this brought Georg Albrecht closer connection to the former ruling Counts of Barby. The marriage was extremely unhappy, and the couple finally divorced in 1732 after eleven years of childless union. Auguste Louise returned to her Silesian homeland and died six months before Georg Albrecht. Neither remarried.

Georg Albrecht succeeded his father as count when Heinrick Albrecht died on 16 February 1728. As count of Barby, Georg Albrecht continued to govern in the same way as his late father. However, he died after only 11 years of governing. Because he died without issue, the Barby line of the Wettin family became extinct and the county of Barby passed to the Electorate of Saxony.

He was buried in the new family vault built by his father in Barby.

Preceded by Heinrich	Count of Barby; 1728 – 1739	Succeeded by County of Barby merged into the Electorate of Saxony
