= Princess Christine of Hesse-Eschwege =

Duchess consort of Brunswick-Wolfenbüttel-Bevern
- Tenure: 25 November 1667 - 23 April 1687
- Born: 30 October 1648; Kassel, Landgraviate of Hesse-Kassel, Holy Roman Empire
- Died: 18 March 1702 (aged 53); Bevern, Principality of Brunswick-Wolfenbüttel, Holy Roman Empire
- Spouse: Ferdinand Albert I, Duke of Brunswick-Wolfenbüttel-Bevern (m. 1667; died 1687)
- Issue: Princess Sophia Eleanora; Prince Augustus Ferdinand; Ferdinand Albert II, Duke of Brunswick-Wolfenbüttel; Prince Ferdinand Christian; Ernest Ferdinand, Duke of Brunswick-Wolfenbüttel-Bevern; Prince Henry Ferdinand
- House: Hesse
- Father: Frederick, Landgrave of Hesse-Eschwege
- Mother: Countess Palatine Eleonora Catherine of Zweibrücken

Christine von Hessen (30 October 1648 – 18 March 1702) was a German noblewoman, belonging to the Hessen-Eschwege branch of the Hessen-Rotenburg line of the House of Hesse. Through her marriage on 25 November 1667 in Eschwege to Ferdinand Albert I, Duke of Brunswick-Lüneburg (1636-1687), she became Duchess-Consort of Braunschweig-Wolfenbüttel-Bevern.

== Life ==
She was born in Kassel as the second of six children of Frederick, Landgrave of Hesse-Eschwege and his wife Eleonore Katharina von Pfalz-Zweibrücken-Kleeburg, sister of the future Charles X Gustav of Sweden. Little is known of her childhood. She spent her early years in Eschwege with her mother but after her father's death fighting for Sweden in the Second Northern War, his younger brother Ernest took over Frederick's share in the 'Rotenburger Quart'. Christine's mother thus moved her children into dowager accommodation in the former Osterholz Convent in Bremen. Christine's family pledged Schloss Eschwege as a dowry to her husband's family, who then held it until 1713. The marriage produced nine children but was marked by Ferdinand's morbid jealousy, strange behaviour and violence.

After their marriage the couple moved into the castle in the small town of Bevern. Ferdinand showed a marked interest in culture - for example, he celebrated his wife's thirtieth birthday by commissioning a play to open a new "Comödien-Saal". Christine worked on arts and crafts (an embroidered vanitas by her survives today in the Herzog Anton Ulrich-Museum) and collected a small library. Ferdinand also travelled, sometimes accompanied by his wife and mother-in-law. These trips included ones to Stockholm in 1667 and 1670–71, the Imperial Court in Vienna in 1674-75 and frequent journeys to Eschwege. Christine and Ferdinand both moved into the former Osterholz Convent in 1681, then in the Domshof in Bremen and finally from 1686 back in Bevern, where Christine remained until 1702, fifteen years after her husband's death.

== Issue ==
- Leopold Karl (*/† 1670)
- Friedrich Albert (1672–1673)
- Sophie Eleonore (1674–1711), canoness in Gandersheim
- Claudia Eleonore (1675–1676)
- August Ferdinand (1677–1704), major general
- Ferdinand Albrecht II. (1680–1735)
- Ernst Ferdinand (1682–1746)
- Ferdinand Christian (1682–1706), canon at Brunswick Cathedral
- Heinrich Ferdinand (1684–1706), Imperial Oberstleutnant, killed in the Battle of Turin

== Ancestry ==
Ancestors of Princess Christine of Hesse-Eschwege

8. William IV, Landgrave of Hesse-Kassel
4. Maurice, Landgrave of Hesse-Kassel
9. Sabine of Württemberg
2. Frederick, Landgrave of Hesse-Eschwege
10. John VII, Count of Nassau-Siegen
5. Juliane of Nassau-Siegen
11. Magdalene of Waldeck-Wildungen
1. Princess Christine of Hesse-Eschwege
12. John I, Count Palatine of Zweibrücken
6. John Casimir, Count Palatine of Kleeburg
13. Magdalene of Jülich-Cleves-Berg
3. Countess Palatine Eleonora Catherine of Zweibrücken
14. Charles IX of Sweden
7. Catherine of Sweden
15. Maria of Palatinate-Simmern

== Bibliography (in German) ==
- Eckhart G. Franz: Das Haus Hessen. Stuttgart 2005, ISBN 3-17-018919-0.
- Holger Th. Gräf: Christina Landgräfin von Hessen-Kassel, verh. Herzogin von Braunschweig-Bevern [HK 26]. In: Eckhart G. Franz (Hrsg.); u.a.: Haus Hessen. Biografisches Lexikon, Darmstadt 2012, S. 108–109, ISBN 978-3-88443-411-6.
- Hans-Günter Kittelmann: Kleiner Führer durch die Rotenburger Quart 1627–1834 und das Fürstenhaus Hessen-Rotenburg. Rotenburg an der Fulda 2002, ISBN 978-3-00-010155-7.
