= Brunswick-Bevern =

German dynasty

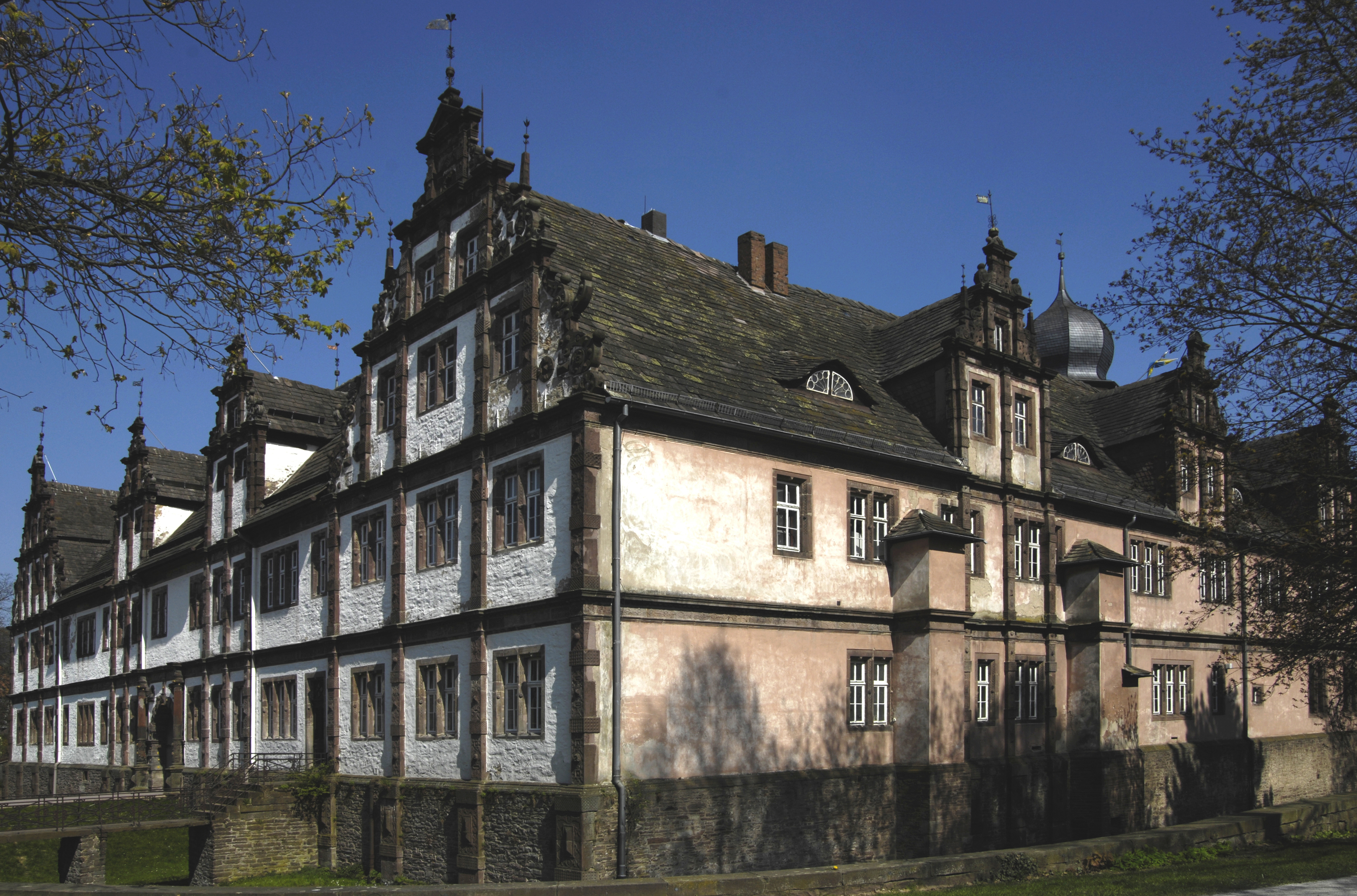
Bevern Castle

Brunswick-Bevern was a secundogeniture of the Younger House of Brunswick, itself a branch of the House of Welf.

Its first member was Ferdinand Albert I of Brunswick-Lüneburg (1636–1687), the fourth son of Duke Augustus the Younger, ruling Prince of Brunswick-Wolfenbüttel. Upon the death of his father in 1666 and a lengthy dispute with his elder brothers, Ferdinand Albert I received Bevern Palace near Holzminden as part of his inheritance. In turn, he had to waive all rights and claims to rule in the Welf Principality of Brunswick-Wolfenbüttel.

Nevertheless, the Bevern line came to power in the Principality of Brunswick-Wolfenbüttel when the main line of the Younger House of Brunswick became extinct with the death of Duke Louis Rudolph in 1735. Ferdinand Albert II, fourth son of Ferdinand Albert I who had succeeded his father in Bevern in 1687, ascended to the throne. At that time, he passed the appanage of Brunswick-Bevern to his younger brother Ernest Ferdinand (1682–1746), who thereby became head of the Younger Brunswick-Bevern line. His sons Augustus William and Frederick Charles Ferdinand held the secundogeniture until 1809. The main Brunswick-Wolfenbüttel line became extinct with the death of Duke William in 1884.

== Dukes of Brunswick-Bevern ==
- 1666-1687: Ferdinand Albert I
  - 1687-1735: Ferdinand Albert II
  - 1735–1746: Ernest Ferdinand
    - 1746–1781: Augustus William
    - 1781–1809: Frederick Charles Ferdinand
