= Countess Palatine Eleonore Catharine of Zweibrücken =

Swedish princess and countess (1626–1692)

Countess Palatine Eleonora Catherine of Zweibrücken
- 'Landgravine of Hesse-Eschwege'
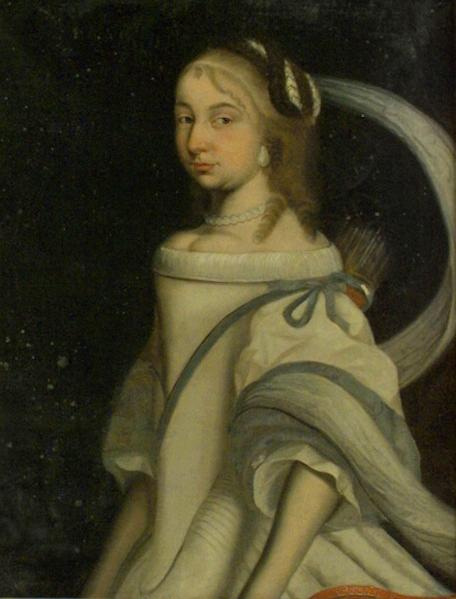
- Countess Palatine Eleonora Catherine of Zweibrücken
- Born: 17 May 1626; Stegeborg Castle, Östergötland, Sweden
- Died: 3 March 1692 (aged 65); Osterholz
- Spouse: Frederick, Landgrave of Hesse-Eschwege
- Issue Detail: Christine, Duchess of Brunswick-Lüneburg-Bevern; Juliana, Baroness of Lilienburg; Charlotte, Countess of Bentheim-Tecklenburg
- House: Wittelsbach
- Father: John Casimir, Count Palatine of Kleeburg
- Mother: Catherine of Sweden

Eleonora Catherine of the Palatinate-Zweibrücken (17 May 1626 – 3 March 1692), was a cousin and foster sister of Queen Christina of Sweden and sister of King Charles X Gustav of Sweden. After her brother's accession to the throne (1654), she and her siblings were all considered royal princesses and princes of Sweden. As the wife of Frederick, Landgrave of Hesse-Eschwege (1617–1655), she was by marriage Landgravine of Hesse-Eschwege, and after her husband's death acted as regent and administrator of his lands (1655–1692).

== Biography ==
Eleonora was born at Stegeborg Castle in Östergötland, Sweden to Princess Catharina of Sweden and Johann Casimir, Count Palatine von Zweibrücken-Kleeburg. Her mother was an elder half-sister of King Gustavus Adolphus of Sweden and the firstborn daughter of King Charles IX. Her parents, who were second cousins, had lived in Sweden since 1622, and Eleonora and her siblings, including her sister Maria Eufrosyne, grew up in Sweden as foster siblings of their cousin, Queen Christina of Sweden. Eleonora was only about seven months older than Christina and had the same teacher, Johannes Matthiæ.

The negotiations concerning her marriage with Landgrave Frederick of Hesse-Eschwege, son of Maurice, Landgrave of Hesse-Kassel, started in 1643. The landgrave was a second cousin of both her parents and nine years her senior. The negotiation process was difficult, but finally completed in June 1646. She was granted a fortune of 20,000 gulden by her father. The marriage took place at Tre Kronor in Stockholm on 6 September 1646.

After the wedding, Eleonora confessed before her husband, "on her knees", that she had had an affair with a French lute-player and actor, named Beschon, from the French court theatre of Antoine de Beaulieu, and was pregnant with his child. Frederick decided to act like nothing happened and hide the matter, but it became a known scandal. Beschon wrote a composition to Eleonora which he sent her along with a letter dated 28 February 1647, but she gave it to her brother; this document is now preserved in the Stegeborg collection. In 1648, she referred to the queen's head lady-in-waiting Margareta Brahe as her "Dearest Protection", likely because Margareta Brahe had defended her when she gave birth to an illegitimate child.

The marriage has been described as unhappy. Eleonora was nevertheless constantly pregnant, giving birth to six children in just seven years; only half of them lived to adulthood. Frederick took part in the war of his brother-in-law in Poland, where he was shot in 1655. Eleonora never remarried. It is said she was too embarrassed by the scandal with Beschon to return to the Swedish court, so she preferred to live in her fief Osterholz, where she founded a pharmacy and hired the first teacher and doctor of the town. Eleonora was the administrator and regent of her husband's possessions in the Holy Roman Empire. Eleonora sent her daughter Juliana to be brought up at the Swedish royal court, where she was regarded as a prospective bride for Charles XI until she became pregnant in 1672. Eleonora did in fact visit Sweden a couple of times: in 1661, in 1674 and in 1681. During her 1674 visit, Lorenzo Magalotti described her as "a wicked, vain, strange, proud and melancholic woman" who spent most of her time in pious devotions.

Eleonora died in Osterholz, Bremen (today's Germany) and is buried at the Altstädter Kirche ("Old City church") in Eschwege where now stands the Marktkirche ("Market Church").

Some of her notable descendants are Wilhelm II, German Emperor; Nicholas II of Russia; Queen Victoria of the United Kingdom; and the present kings of Sweden and the United Kingdom, Carl XVI Gustaf and Charles III.

== Children ==
- Margarete (b. Erfurt, 31 March 1647 – d. Erfurt, 19 October 1647). (Note: Probably she was the child product of the affair with the lute-player. According to historiography, Eleonora Catherine confessed the affair to her husband at the beginning of 1647, when the pregnancy could no longer be concealed.)
- Christine (b. Kassel, 30 October 1648 – d. Bevern, 18 March 1702), married in 1667 to Ferdinand Albert I, Duke of Brunswick-Lüneburg-Bevern.
- Elizabeth (b. Eschwege, 7 April 1650 – d. Eschwege, 27 April 1651).
- Juliana (b. Eschwege, 14 May 1652 – d. IJsselstein, 20 June 1693), prospective bride of Charles XI of Sweden; married in 1680 Johann Jakob Marchand, Baron of Lilienburg.
- Charlotte (b. Eschwege, 3 September 1653 – d. Bremen, 7 February 1708), married firstly in 1673 with Prince August of Saxe-Weissenfels (son of Duke August) and secondly in 1679 with John Adolph, Count of Bentheim-Tecklenburg (divorced 1693).
- Frederick, Hereditary Prince of Hesse-Eschwege (b. Eschwege, 30 November 1654 – d. Eschwege, 27 July 1655).

== Ancestry ==
Ancestors of Countess Palatine Eleonore Catharine of Zweibrücken

8. Wolfgang, Count Palatine of Zweibrücken
4. John I, Count Palatine of Zweibrücken
9. Anna of Hesse
2. John Casimir, Count Palatine of Kleeburg
10. William, Duke of Jülich-Cleves-Berg
5. Magdalene of Jülich-Cleves-Berg
11. Maria of Austria
1. Eleonora Catharina of Pfalz-Zweibrücken
12. Gustav I of Sweden
6. Charles IX of Sweden
13. Margaret Leijonhufvud
3. Catharina of Sweden
14. Louis VI, Elector Palatine
7. Maria of the Palatinate-Simmern
15. Elisabeth of Hesse

== Notes ==
Countess Palatine Eleonore Catharine of Zweibrücken House of Palatinate-Zweibrücken Cadet branch of the House of Wittelsbach Born: 17 May 1626 Died: 3 March 1692
German royalty
Vacant Title last held by Juliane of Nassau-Siegen as Landgravine of Hesse-Kassel	Landgravine consort of Hesse-Eschwege; 8 September 1646 – 24 September 1655	Succeeded by Eleonora of Solms-Lich
