= Ferdinand Albert I of Brunswick-Wolfenbüttel-Bevern =

First Duke of Brunswick-Bevern

Ferdinand Albert I
- Duke of Brunswick-Lüneburg
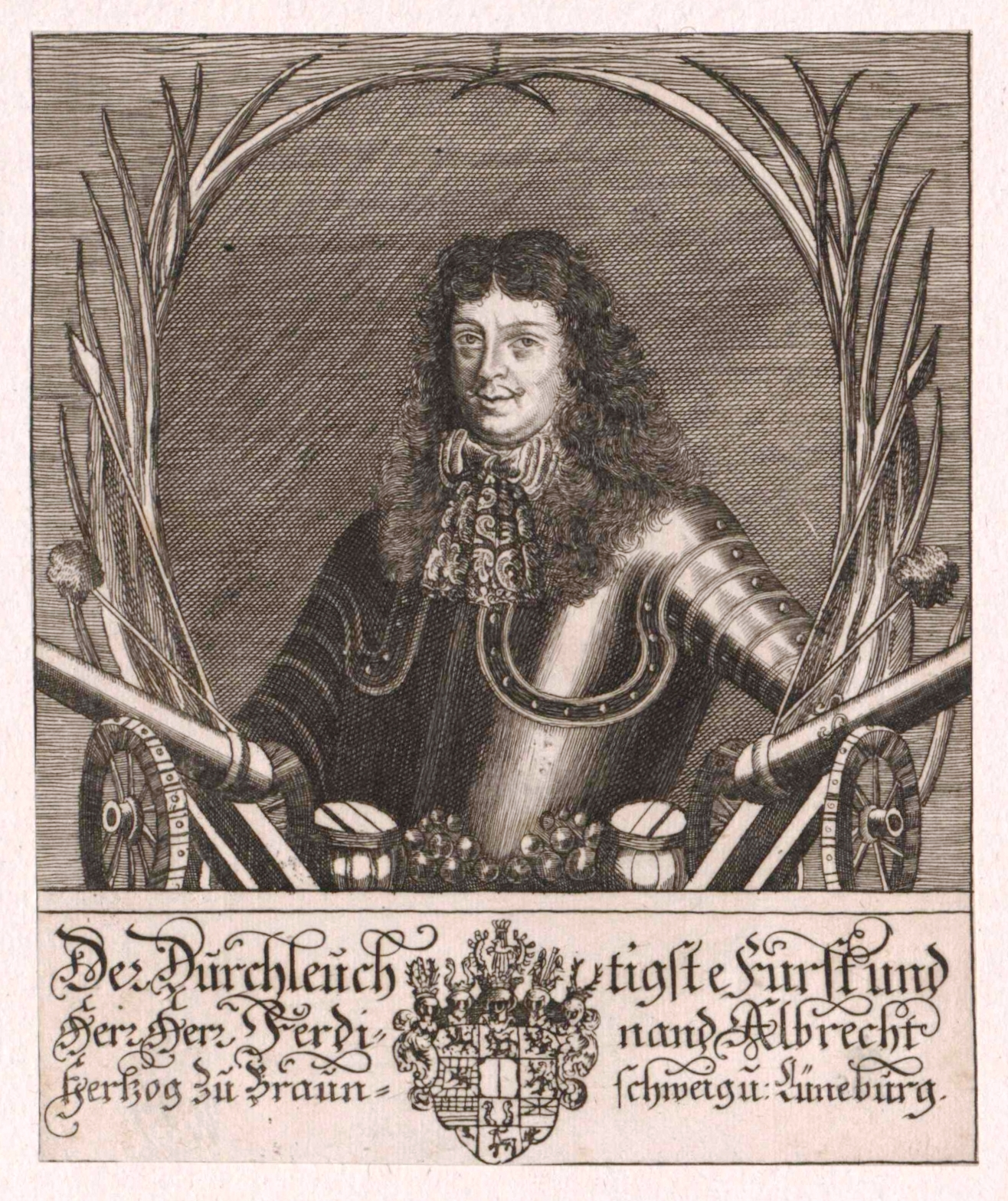
- Ferdinand Albert of Brunswick
- Born: 22 May 1636; Brunswick, Brunswick-Wolfenbüttel
- Died: 23 April 1687 (aged 50); Bevern, Brunswick-Wolfenbüttel
- Spouse: Christine of Hesse-Eschwege (m. 1667)
- Issue Detail: Princess Sophia Eleanora; Prince Augustus Ferdinand; Ferdinand Albert II, Duke of Brunswick-Wolfenbüttel; Prince Ferdinand Christian; Ernest Ferdinand, Duke of Brunswick-Wolfenbüttel-Bevern; Prince Henry Ferdinand
- House: Welf
- Father: Augustus the Younger, Duke of Brunswick-Lüneburg
- Mother: Elisabeth Sophie of Mecklenburg

Ferdinand Albert I (German: Ferdinand Albrecht I.; 22 May 1636 – 23 April 1687), a member of the House of Welf, was a Duke of Brunswick-Lüneburg. After a 1667 inheritance agreement in the Principality of Brunswick-Wolfenbüttel, he received the secundogeniture of Brunswick-Bevern, which he ruled until his death.

== Life ==
Ferdinand Albert was born in Brunswick, the fourth son of Duke Augustus the Younger, reigning Prince of Brunswick-Wolfenbüttel, from his third marriage with Duchess Elisabeth Sophie of Mecklenburg. Raised at his father's residence, the young man received a comprehensive education, with Justus Georg Schottel and Sigmund von Birken among his tutors.

After the father's death in 1666, the sons quarreled about the heritage. Eventually, Ferdinand Albert received the palace of Bevern near Holzminden, some feudal rights, and a certain amount of money in exchange for his claims to the government of Brunswick-Wolfenbüttel, which was to be ruled by his elder half-brothers Rudolph Augustus and Anthony Ulrich.

Ferdinand Albert joined the Royal Society in 1665 and was admitted to the Fruitbearing Society by Duke Augustus of Saxe-Weissenfels in 1673. Over the years, however, he grew more and more eccentric, and at some point his brothers had to send a military force to restore order at his palace. He collected many works of art, which later became part of the Herzog Anton Ulrich Museum in Brunswick. He died in 1687 at Bevern; his son and successor, Ferdinand Albert II, inherited the Principality of Brunswick-Wolfenbüttel decades later.

== Family ==
Ferdinand Albert married Christine of Hesse-Eschwege (30 October 1648 - 18 March 1702), a daughter of Landgrave Frederick of Hesse-Eschwege and Countess Palatine Eleonora Catherine of Zweibrücken, in 1667. They had the following children that reached adulthood:

- Sophia Eleanora (24 August 1674 – 10 September 1711), died childless
- Augustus Ferdinand (29 December 1677 – 2 July 1704), died childless
- Ferdinand Albert II (1680–1735)
- Ferdinand Christian ( 8 September 1682 – 18 March 1706), died childless
- Ernest Ferdinand (1682–1746)
- Henry Ferdinand (12 April 1684 – 7 September 1706), died childless

== Ancestors ==
Ancestors of Ferdinand Albert I of Brunswick-Wolfenbüttel-Bevern

8. Ernest I, Duke of Brunswick-Lüneburg
4. Henry III, Duke of Brunswick-Lüneburg
9. Sophia of Mecklenburg-Schwerin
2. Augustus the Younger, Duke of Brunswick-Lüneburg
10. Francis I, Duke of Saxe-Lauenburg
5. Ursula of Saxe-Lauenburg-Ratzeburg
11. Sibylle of Saxony
1. Ferdinand Albert I, Duke of Brunswick-Lüneburg
12. John VII, Duke of Mecklenburg
6. John Albert II, Duke of Mecklenburg-Güstrow
13. Sophia of Schleswig-Holstein-Gottorp
3. Elizabeth Sophia of Mecklenburg-Güstrow
14. Christopher, Duke of Mecklenburg
7. Elizabeth of Mecklenburg-Gadebusch
15. Princess Elizabeth of Sweden

Ferdinand Albert I of Brunswick-Wolfenbüttel-Bevern House of Welf Born: 22 May 1636 Died: 25 April 1687
Preceded by Augustus the Younger as Duke of Brunswick-Wolfenbüttel	Duke of Brunswick-Bevern; 1666-1687	Succeeded by Ferdinand Albert II
