= Augustus, Duke of Saxe-Weissenfels =

Administrator of the archbishopric of Magdeburg

Augustus of Saxe-Weissenfels
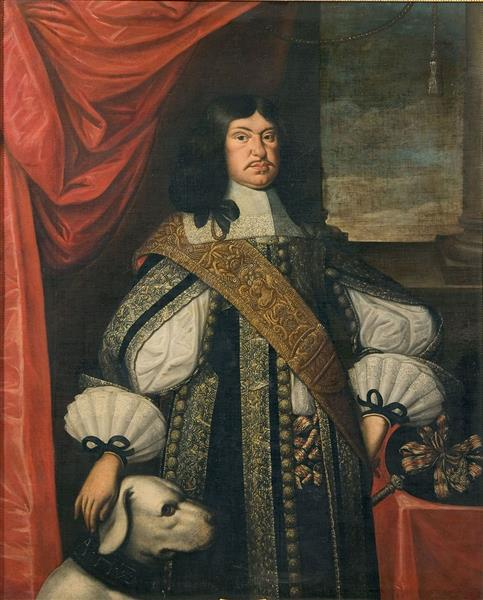
- Portrait c. 1655
- Born: 13 August 1614; Dresden, Electorate of Saxony
- Died: 4 June 1680 (aged 65); Halle, Archbishopric of Magdeburg
- Spouse: Anna Maria of Mecklenburg-Schwerin; Johanna Walpurgis of Leiningen-Westerburg
- Issue: Magdalene Sibylle, Duchess of Saxe-Gotha-Altenburg; Johann Adolf I, Duke of Saxe-Weissenfels; Prince Augustus; Prince Christian; Princess Anna Maria; Sophie, Princess of Anhalt-Zerbst; Christine, Princess of Holstein-Gottorp; Henry, Count of Barby; Prince Albert; Frederick, Duke of Saxe-Weissenfels-Dahme
- House: Wettin
- Father: John George I, Elector of Saxony
- Mother: Magdalene Sibylle of Prussia

Augustus of Saxe-Weissenfels (13 August 1614 in Dresden – 4 June 1680 in Halle), was a Duke of Saxe-Weissenfels-Querfurt of the House of Wettin and administrator of the Archbishopric of Magdeburg.

He was the fourth (but second surviving) son of John George I, Elector of Saxony, and his second wife, Magdalene Sibylle of Prussia.

== Early life ==
On 23 January 1628, at the age of 13, August was appointed administrator of the Archbishopric of Magdeburg by its Chapter to replace the current holder of that title, Christian Wilhelm of Brandenburg. By that time, August had already served three years as coadjutor. Nevertheless, he could not assume his post: on 20 May 1631, after seven months of siege and plundering during the Sack of Magdeburg, the city was taken by the Imperial troops; the Catholic competitor for the diocese, Archduke Leopold Wilhelm of Austria, assumed the title of archbishop and administrator of Magdeburg. The Peace of Prague (1635) confirmed his rule over the city, but three years later, Swedish troops expelled the Habsburg army and restored August as administrator as of 19 October 1638. August finally took full control of Magdeburg on 31 December 1642 after a neutrality treaty was concluded with the Swedish general Lennart Torstenson. He was then able to begin the reconstruction of the city.

In 1643 August was accepted into the Fruitbearing Society at the behest of Louis I, Prince of Anhalt-Köthen.

== Duke of Saxe-Weissenfels ==
In his will of 20 July 1652, Elector John George I ordered a division of the Albertine territories that was carried out on 22 April 1657 in Dresden. August inherited the towns of Weißenfels and Querfurt and became their first duke.

August also increased his incomes by taking over the administration of the County of Barby during the minority of Count August Ludwig. On 17 October 1659, however, the young count died shortly before attaining his majority. With him, the line of Barby became extinct. A dispute over his lands was resolved in favor of August seven years later (1666). In his will, the duke left Barby to his son Heinrich.

On 25 July 1660, August laid the first stone for his official residence, Schloss Neu-Augustusburg in Weissenfels. This castle was built in the same place as the old one, which had been devastated by Swedish troops. The duke died before the castle was finished.

On 15 July 1667, the sons of the late Duke Wilhelm of Saxe-Weimar offered August the presidency of the Fruitbearing Society. He accepted the office with its responsibility for fostering the work of artists and scientists. His activities as a patron left considerable debts for his descendants to deal with.

== Marriages and issue ==
In Schwerin on 23 November 1647 August married Anna Maria of Mecklenburg-Schwerin. They had twelve children:

1. Magdalene Sibylle (b. Halle, 2 September 1648 - d. Gotha, 7 January 1681), married on 14 November 1669 to Duke Frederick I of Saxe-Gotha-Altenburg.
2. Johann Adolf I (b. Halle, 2 November 1649 - d. Weissenfels, 24 May 1697).
3. August (b. Halle, 3 December 1650 - d. Halle, 11 August 1674), Provost of Magdeburg; married on 25 August 1673 to Landgravine Charlotte of Hesse-Eschwege. Their only son was stillborn (24 April 1674).
4. Christian (b. Halle, 25 January 1652 - killed in action at Mainz, 24 August 1689), General Field Marshal of the Saxon Electoral Army, never married or had issue.
5. Anna Maria (b. Halle, 28 February 1653 - d. Halle, 17 February 1671) died unmarried.
6. Sophie (b. Halle, 23 June 1654 - d. Zerbst, 31 March 1724), married on 18 June 1676 to Karl, Prince of Anhalt-Zerbst.
7. Katharine (b. Halle, 12 September 1655 - d. Halle, 21 April 1663) died in childhood.
8. Christine (b. Halle, 25 August 1656 - d. Eutin, 27 April 1698), married on 21 June 1676 to August Friedrich of Holstein-Gottorp, Prince-Bishop of Lübeck (son of Frederick III, Duke of Holstein-Gottorp, and his wife Duchess Marie Elisabeth of Saxony).
9. Heinrich (b. Halle, 29 September 1657 - d. Barby, 16 February 1728); he inherited Barby.
10. Albrecht (b. Halle, 14 April 1659 - d. Leipzig, 9 May 1692).
11. Elisabeth (b. Halle, 25 August 1660 - d. Halle, 11 May 1663) died in early childhood.
12. Dorothea (b. Halle, 17 December 1662 - d. Halle, 12 May 1663) died in infancy.

In Halle on 29 January 1672, two years after the death of his first wife, August married Countess Johanna Walpurgis of Leiningen-Westerburg. They had three sons:

1. Frederick (b. Halle, 20 November 1673 - d. Dahme, 16 April 1715), he inherited Dahme.
2. Maurice (b. Halle, 5 January 1676 - d. Szeged, Hungary, 12 September 1695) died unmarried and without issue.
3. Stillborn son (1679).

Regnal titles
New title	Duke of Saxe-Weissenfels; 1657–80	Succeeded by Johann Adolf I
Preceded by August Ludwig	Count of Barby; 1659–80	Succeeded by Heinrich
Religious titles
Preceded by Leopold Wilhelm of Austria as Catholic Administrator	Lutheran Administrator of Magdeburg; 1638–80	Secularised to Duchy of Magdeburg
Other offices
Preceded by Wilhelm, Duke of Saxe-Weimar	Head of the Fruitbearing Society; 1667–80	No replacement
