= Heinrich of Saxe-Weissenfels, Count of Barby =

German prince

Heinrich of Saxe-Weissenfels, Count of Barby (b. Halle, 29 September 1657 - d. Barby, 16 February 1728), was a German prince of the House of Wettin and count of Barby.

He was the fourth son of August, Duke of Saxe-Weissenfels, by his first wife, Duchess Anna Maria of Mecklenburg-Schwerin.

== Early life ==
Heinrich, as the fourth son of his father, had little chance of inheriting any lands, and so his father, who served as administrator of the Diocese of Magdeburg, arranged for his appointment in 1674 as Provost of Magdeburg upon the death of the incumbent, his older brother August.

Heinrich's grandfather, the Elector Johann Georg I, who was also a feudal lord of the county of Barby, chose to make land provisions in his will for his three younger sons. He gave his second son August (Heinrich's father) not only the duchy of Saxe-Weissenfels, but guaranteed to him and his heirs the possession of the county of Barby in the event of the extinction of the count's line.

When August Ludwig, the last count of Barby-Mühlingen, died childless in 1659, some parts of the county were inherited, in accordance with Johann Georg I's will, by Heinrich's father August of Saxe-Weissenfels, who in consequence became count of Barby.

== Count of Barby ==
After the death of his father in 1680, Heinrich, at that time Dean of the Cathedral of Magdeburg, inherited the County of Barby according to the terms of his will.

Because Heinrich (as well as each of his brothers) had a claim to be called duke of Saxe-Weissenfels, he became the first duke of Saxe-Weissenfels-Barby at the death of his father. The title brought him prestige, but neither a seat nor a voice in the Reichstag, nor sovereignty within the duchy of Saxe-Weissenfels, rather political dependence on the main line of the family and the Electorate of Saxony.

Heinrich's rule over Barby nonetheless had significant economic and cultural importance for the city and the region. Like the Weissenfels court of his cousins, he attracted notable artists and musicians, for example the hornists Wenzel Franz Seydler and Hans Leopold. The pedagogue and lexicographer Johann Theodor Jablonski was his advisor from 1689 to 1700.

His charitable activities included donations to a fund to benefit the widows of clergymen and permission to build a "Preacher Widow's House" (Prediger-Witwen-Haus) as well as a new school. Following the example of his cousin Johann Georg, Duke of Saxe-Weissenfels, he created in 1699 a Citizens' Company (Bürgerkompanie) with the responsibility of ensuring order during civic celebrations. Moreover, the whole county was measured geodetically; this permitted the city and village churches to reform their training systems.

Heinrich was also active as a general and participated in the Great Turkish War. At the siege of Ofen (1684/1686) he distinguished himself together with his brother Christian.

After 1687 he vacated the old official castle for good and began the construction of Schloss Barby as his new residence. The master builders were Christoph Pitzler and from 1707 Giovanni Simonetti, who orientated himself from plans drawn up by Johann Arnold Nering. The building could only be finished in 1715; in the meanwhile, Heinrich and his wife spend long periods of time in Dessau with his father-in-law John George II, Prince of Anhalt-Dessau, and his brother-in-law Leopold I, Prince of Anhalt-Dessau.

Great importance was attached to his defection from Lutheranism to Calvinism in Dessau on 1688. In Barby, members of the Reformed Church established themselves there until 1833.

Heinrich was also accepted into the Fruitbearing Society by his father, who served as its head.

Heinrich died in Barby at age seventy and was buried there in the new family vault. His only surviving son, Georg Albrecht, succeeded him.

== Marriage and issue ==
In Dessau on 30 March 1686 Heinrich married Princess Elisabeth Albertine of Anhalt-Dessau, daughter of John George II, Prince of Anhalt-Dessau, and former Abbess of Herford. Elisabeth's paternal great-great grandmother was Countess Agnes of Barby-Mühlingen (1540-1569); this give to Heinrich some blood ties to the extinct Counts of Barby. They had eight children:

1. Johann August, Hereditary Prince of Saxe-Weissenfels-Barby (b. Dessau, 28 July 1687 - d. Dessau, 22 January 1688) died in infancy.
2. Johann August, Hereditary Prince of Saxe-Weissenfels-Barby (b. Dessau, 24 July 1689 - d. Dessau, 21 October 1689) died in infancy.
3. Stillborn twin sons (Dessau, 1690).
4. Frederick Heinrich, Hereditary Prince of Saxe-Weissenfels-Barby (b. Dessau, 2 July 1692 - d. The Hague, 21 November 1711) died unmarried and without issue.
5. Georg Albrecht of Saxe-Weissenfels, Count of Barby (b. Dessau, 19 April 1695 - d. Barby, 12 June 1739).
6. Henriette Marie (b. Dessau, 1 March 1697 - d. Weissenfels, 10 August 1719) died unmarried and without issue.
7. Stillborn daughter (Dessau, 5 October 1706).

Preceded by August, Duke of Saxe-Weissenfels	Count of Barby; 1680–1728	Succeeded by Georg Albrecht
