= Svēte =

Svēte may refer to:

- Svēte River, a river that flows through the northern part of Lithuania and the southern part of Latvia
- Svēte parish, an administrative unit of the Jelgava district, Latvia
- Svēte, a populated place in Svēte parish
- Svēte Manor, a manor in Svēte parish, in the region of Zemgale, Latvia
