= Anastasia Thompson =

Russian-American ballerina (born 2003)

Anastasia V Thompson is a Russian-American Ballerina and Social Media Influencer.

Thompson graduated from the Moscow State Academy of Choreography in 2022. She went on to dance for Mikhailovsky Theatre until 2025. She lives in Moscow with her family and continues to model and post on social media. She remains a dancer and influencer but is also a creative director and choreographer. Her Instagram account has over 45,000 followers and her TikTok has over 440,000 followers.

== Early life ==
Thompson was born in New York City on 25 June 2003 to Charles Thompson, an American photographer and director, Charles father was Wade Thompson(d.2009), a industrialist founder of Thor Thor Industries and philanthropist and Olya Thompson (née Yakovleva), a Russian retired ballerina, now a textile designer and socialite.Thanks to her mother's socialite status, Thompson and her siblings have featured in several Vogue articles throughout their childhood and family modelling. Thompson is the eldest of eight children, she has five younger sisters, Natalia, Marusya (Maria) , Anna, Tatiana, Zinaida and two younger brothers, Alexander (Sasha) and Nikolai. They lived in a $5 million Brownstone Brooklyn House in NYC until 2011 when the family moved back to Moscow. They have an apartment in Red Square and a dacha (second home) in the countryside. At ten years old, Thompson began training at the Moscow State Academy of Choreography until she graduated in 2022. She revealed in a podcast interview that she had suffered from an injury in 2022/2023, forcing her to recover at home for six months.

== Career ==
Between 2024 and 2025, Thompson danced professionally for the Mikhailovsky Theatre. Her solo debut included the performance of Don Quixote. She also performed significant roles in The Lady of the Camellias, Giselle and La fille mal gardée. She reportedly left the Mikhailovsky Theatre around late 2025. In April 2026, Thompson started her personal dance project lavieendanse, performing at the Petrovsky Palace and the Catherine Palace (Moscow).

Alongside ballet, Thompson frequently models for brands like Abituworld and Axenoff Jewellery, whom the founder, Petr Axenoff, is a family friend. In 2019, the Thompson family attended the Tatler Ball wearing Axenoff Jewelry. In 2021, the family attended the Tatler Ball dressed in Yanina Couture. Thompson was spotted at Moscow Fashion Week in 2026.

She grew a following on TikTok where she posted lifestyle and ballet content, receiving popularity however since 2023, her posts are infrequent.

As a creative director, in 2026, she led (and modelled herself) a photoshoot of models, including her sisters Marusya and Anna, for the fashion brand ChicBleskKrasota.

== Personal life ==
Thompson is a dual citizen of Russia and the United States. She stated on Tiktok that she is 5"8. She shares a middle name with multiple of her sisters. She's named Lana Del Rey as one of her biggest inspirations. She also stated on Tiktok that Titanic (1997 film) is her favourite movie.
