= Kaucminde Manor =

Manor house in Latvia

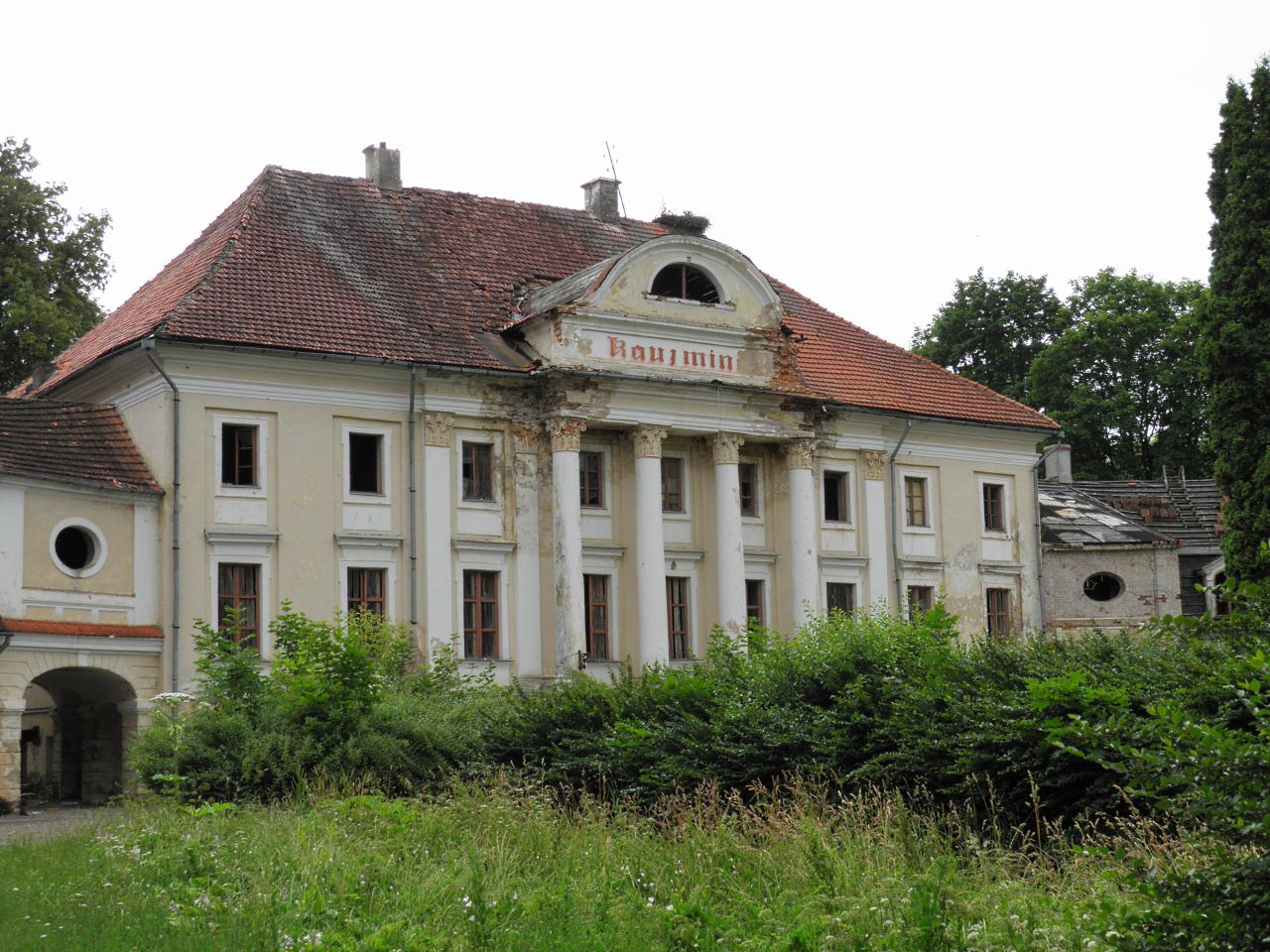
- Interactive map of the Kaucminde Manor area

General information
- Architectural style: Classicism
- Location: Saulaine, LV-3901,, Rundāle parish, Latvia
- Coordinates: 56°23′31″N 24°07′50″E
- Completed: 1780
- Client: von der Pahlen family

Design and construction
- Architect: Severin Jensen

Kaucminde Manor (German: Gut Kauzminde/Kauzmünde) is a manor house, also referred to as a palace due to its design, in the Rundāle Parish of Bauska Municipality in the Semigallia region of Latvia.

== History ==
The manor house was built around 1780 for Count Peter Ludwig von der Pahlen by Danish-born architect Severin Jensen. A project to attach the manor house to the adjacent buildings was completed in 1912, so the semi-circular complex is also called Kaucminde Palace.

== See also ==
- List of palaces and manor houses in Latvia
