= Severin Jensen =

Danish architect active in Courland and Italy

- Born: Severin Sören Jensen; 1723; Copenhagen, Denmark
- Died: After 1809; Mitau, Courland Governorate, Russian Empire (now Jelgava, Latvia)
- Known for: Architecture
- Notable work: Kaucminde Manor, Vircava Manor, Academia Petrina
- Movement: Classicism
- Patrons: Bartolomeo Rastrelli

Severin Jensen (1723 – after 1809) was a Danish architect who worked mainly in the Duchy of Courland and Semigallia. In 1772 he became a chief architect of Duke Peter von Biron, and in 1795 the chief architect of the Courland Governorate.

== Biography ==
Severin Sören Jensen was born in 1723 in Copenhagen, Kingdom of Denmark. There are no reliable sources about his early life or education. In 1766 Jensen arrived in the Duchy of Courland and Semigallia and was hired as an assistant to architect Bartolomeo Rastrelli. He was a foreman (Kondukteur) and supervised construction of the Rundāle and Jelgava Palaces. The gates and stable complex of Rundāle palace, however, were built after Jensen's own project in 1766-67. He also supervised construction of Zaļenieki Manor (1769–1774).

In 1772 the last Duke of Courland Peter von Biron promoted Jensen to chief architect of the duchy (Hofarchitekt). In 1770 the Duke's hunting lodge in Pienava (German: Pönau) was built after Jensen's design. In 1780 it was named Friedrichlust in honour of Frederick William II of Prussia. From 1775 until 1785 the Duke's favourite Vircava Manor was built after Jensen's design. In 1773–75 Jensen reconstructed and expanded the Svēte Manor near Jelgava. In 1774–75 the Academia Petrina in Jelgava was built after Jensen's design. After the Duchy of Courland and Semigallia was incorporated into the Russian Empire in 1795, Severin Jensen became chief architect of the newly established Courland Governorate.

In 1803 Jensen left Courland and traveled to Italy where he participated in the building of Royal Palace of Caserta.

The last years of his life are poorly documented. Most sources claim that Severin Jensen died after 1809 in Jelgava. He worked in the style of Classicism which was very popular in Peter von Biron's court. In his early works (stables of Rundāle palace, Zaļenieki manor) interesting symbiosis of baroque and classicism can be seen. His later works are bright examples of classicism however with their distinct character.

== Gallery ==
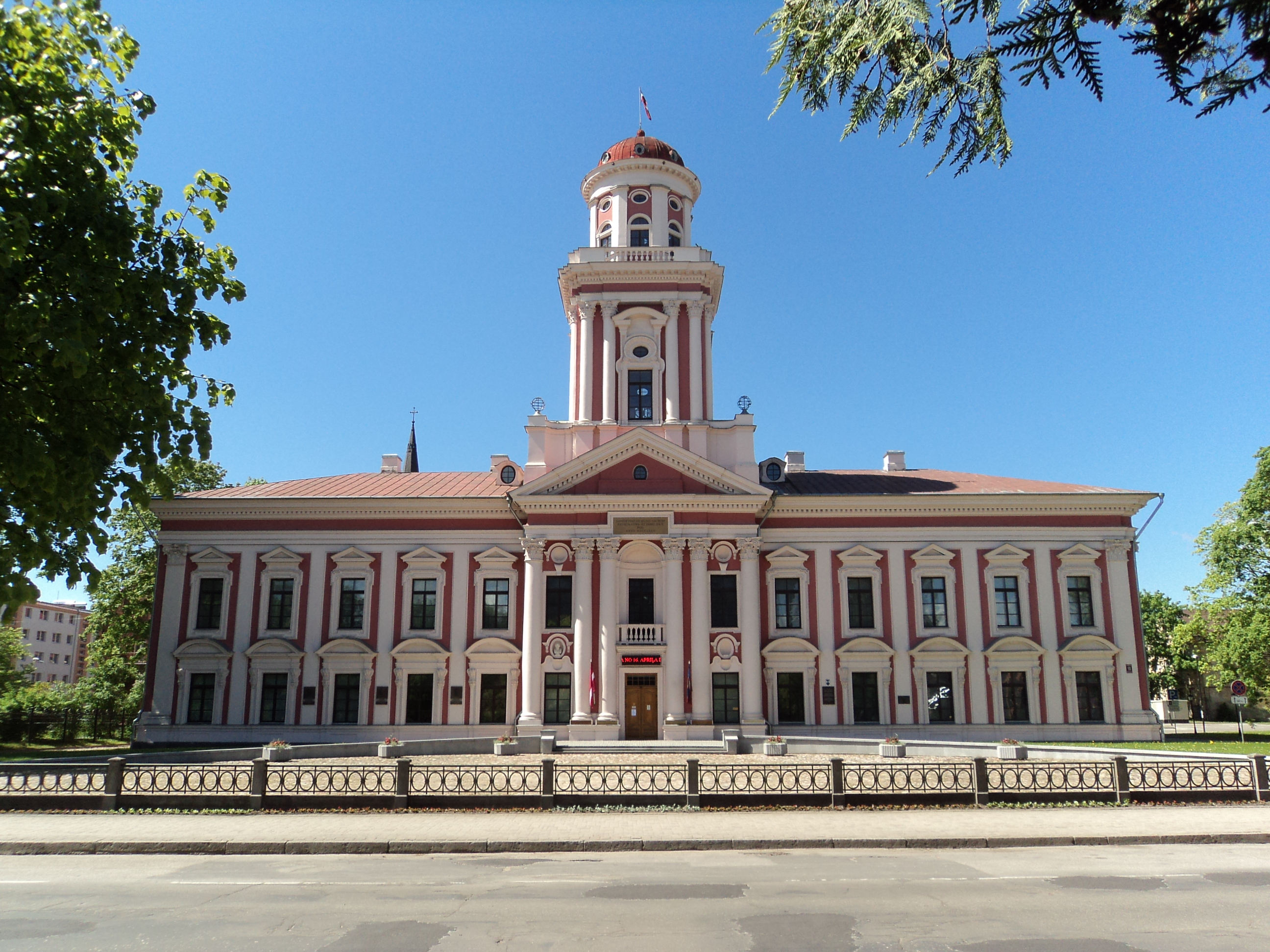
Building of Academia Petrina in Jelgava (1775)

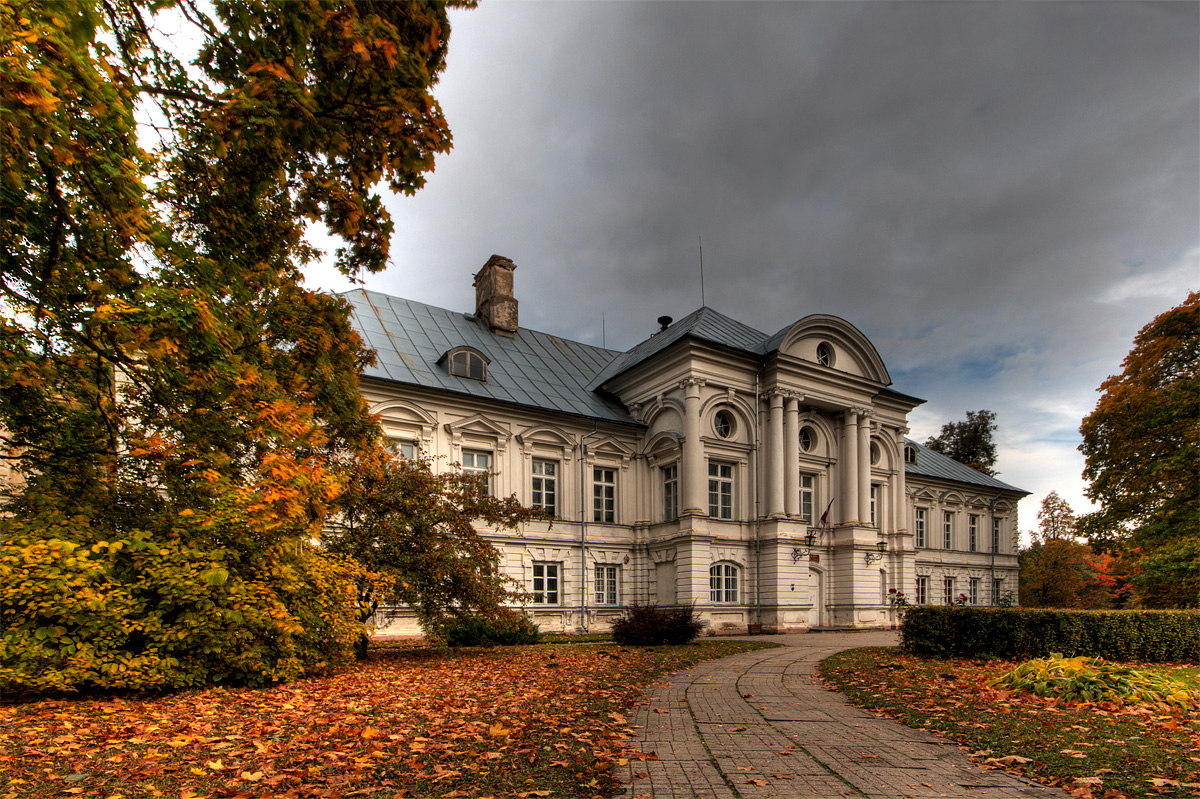
Building of Zaļenieki Manor (together with B.Rastrelli)

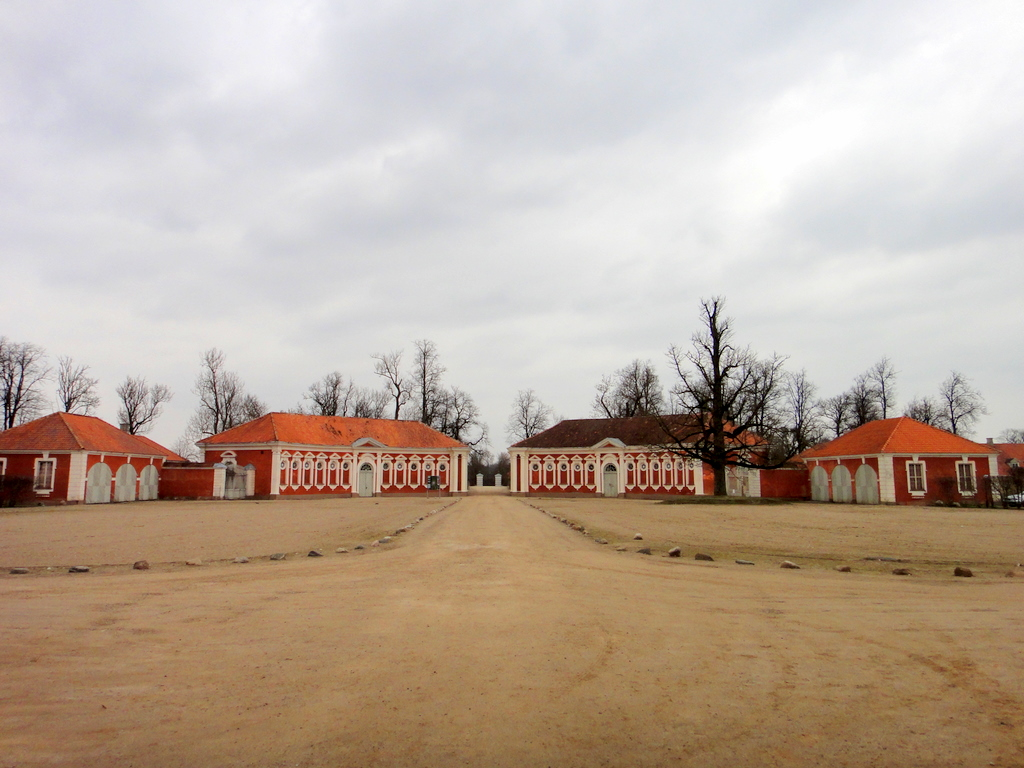
Stables of Rundāle palace
