= Vesna Šouc =

- Born: Vesna Šouc; Zemun, SR Serbia, SFR Yugoslavia
- Genres: Classical music, Opera, Ballet, Musical
- Occupations: Conductor, Music educator, professor
- Labels: PGP-RTB, Mandala - Harmonia Mundi, NATAN
- Website: www.vesnasouc.com

Vesna Šouc is a Serbian conductor and music educator. Her career is marked by successful leadership of symphony, opera, ballet, musical, and choral ensembles, as well as dedicated pedagogical work at the Faculty of Music in Belgrade, where she is a full professor and Head of the Conducting Department.

Vesna Šouc's career represents a continuous interaction between her performing practice and pedagogical activities. The experience gained on the conductor's podium directly enriches her work with students, while her pedagogical work keeps her in constant contact with new generations. Simultaneously, she is active as a conductor in three significant Belgrade theatres: the National Theatre in Belgrade, the Madlenianum Opera and Theatre, and the Terazije Theatre. Throughout her decades-long career, she has had hundreds of concert appearances and conducted over two thousand theatre performances.

== Early life, family background, and education ==
Vesna Šouc was born in Zemun, into a well-known musical family. Her father, Mirko Šouc, was a prominent Serbian jazz musician – composer, arranger, conductor, pianist, vibraphonist, and vocalist. Vesna Šouc states that her father and professor Darinka Matić Marović were her greatest role models.

She received her formal music education at the Faculty of Music in Belgrade. She first graduated from the Department of Music Pedagogy in October 1989, and then from the Department of Conducting in December 1990. For her final conducting exam (a public concert), she received the "Petar Milošević" Fund Award as the best student of that year (1990). She obtained her Master of Arts degree in conducting in March 1993, in the class of Professor Emerita Darinka Matić Marović. The topic of her master's thesis was "Elements of Francis Poulenc's Musical Style in the Examples of the Concerts 'Champêtre' and the Concerto for Two Pianos and Orchestra in D minor".

== Building a conducting career: Key engagements and achievements ==
Throughout her career, Vesna Šouc has conducted over two thousand theatre performances (opera, ballet, musical).

=== Theatrical activity ===
==== National Theatre in Belgrade ====
Vesna Šouc is a permanent conductor of the Opera at the National Theatre in Belgrade. Previously, she also served as the Choir Master of the National Theatre Opera.

Selected productions at the National Theatre conducted by Vesna Šouc
Title	Composer/Music Author	Type	Year/Period	Note	Source
L'italiana in Algeri	Gioachino Rossini	Opera	2016	Revival; conductor at the performance on May 22, 2016	
Queen Margot	Goran Bregović	Ballet		Conductor	
The Lady of the Camellias	Giuseppe Verdi / arr.	Ballet		Conductor	
The Barber of Seville	Gioachino Rossini	Opera	2019	Mentioned in critique	
Twilight	Stevan Hristić	Opera	2016	Premiere, mentioned in critique	

==== Madlenianum Opera and Theatre ====
At the Madlenianum Opera and Theatre, Vesna Šouc is engaged as a permanent conductor, and for a period, she was also the chief conductor of this house. She received the Charter for exceptional long-term artistic contribution to the Madlenianum Opera and Theatre in 2019.

Selected productions at the Madlenianum Opera and Theatre conducted by Vesna Šouc
Title	Composer/Author	Type	Year/Period	Note	Source
Company	Stephen Sondheim (music and lyrics), George Furth (book)	Musical		Conductor	
Mandragola	Ivan Jevtić (music), Vesna Miladinović (libretto after N. Machiavelli)	Comic opera	2009	World premiere December 16, 2009	
The Merry Widow	Franz Lehár	Operetta	2020	Premiere in February 2020	
La Vie parisienne	Jacques Offenbach	Operetta	2022 (announced)	Conductor at the premiere on October 1, 2022	

==== Terazije Theatre ====
At the Terazije Theatre, Vesna Šouc holds the position of musical director, i.e., chief conductor. For her work, she received the Annual Award for the premiere of the musical The Phantom of the Opera in 2017, as well as the Annual Award of the Terazije Theatre in 2016. She conducted the musical The Drowsy Chaperone, for whose orchestral performance she received praise from the author Lisa Lambert.

Selected productions at the Terazije Theatre conducted by Vesna Šouc
Title	Composer/Author	Year/Period	Note	Source
The Phantom of the Opera	Andrew Lloyd Webber	2017	Awarded premiere	
The Drowsy Chaperone	Lisa Lambert, Greg Morrison (music and lyrics); Bob Martin, Don McKellar (book)	2019	Author's praise for orchestral performance	

==== Serbian National Theatre in Novi Sad ====
Vesna Šouc is also engaged as a conductor at the Serbian National Theatre in Novi Sad.

=== Symphonic, concert, and choral activity ===
She has performed in over six hundred concerts. She has conducted all symphony orchestras in Serbia and has led the Symphony Orchestra of the Faculty of Music in Belgrade. She has collaborated with numerous chamber ensembles, including the Belgrade Chamber Orchestra "Dušan Skovran", St. George Strings, RTS Chamber Orchestra, Novi Sad Chamber Orchestra, and the Chamber Orchestra of the School for Music Talents from Ćuprija.

Her international career includes performances at venues such as Salle Gaveau in Paris and the Alexandrinsky Theatre in Saint Petersburg. She has conducted renowned foreign orchestras: Riga Philharmonic (Latvia), MATÁV Symphony Orchestra Budapest (Hungary), Szeged Symphony Orchestra (Hungary), Presidential Symphony Orchestra Ankara (CSO, Turkey), Istanbul Symphony Orchestra (Turkey), Bursa Symphony Orchestra (Turkey), Sarajevo Philharmonic (Bosnia and Herzegovina), Banja Luka Philharmonic (Bosnia and Herzegovina), and the Narni Festival Symphony Orchestra (Italy). She has performed in France, Germany, Russia, Italy, Denmark, Switzerland, Latvia, Greece, Slovakia, Canada, Turkey, Hungary, Slovenia, Croatia, Republika Srpska, Bosnia and Herzegovina, North Macedonia, and Spain.

In the domain of choral conducting, she was the founder and conductor of the "Branko Radičević" and "Belcanto" choirs, and also led the "Lola" choir.

=== Repertoire policy and artistic expression ===
Vesna Šouc's repertoire includes works from the world's classical heritage, as well as works by contemporary authors, including a large number of premiere performances. Examples include the world premiere of the comic opera "Mandragola" by Ivan Jevtić and the Serbian premiere of Alfred Schnittke's work in collaboration with violinist Mina Mendelson.

Vesna Šouc's artistic philosophy emphasizes that "a conductor does not exist without an ensemble," highlighting the importance of teamwork and mutual trust. She perceives music as a "universal language that evokes emotions." Critics often highlight her "graceful, rhythmic gesturing," "captivating composure," ability to "keep everything under control with a magic wand," "defined and penetratingly musical tone," as well as "strong artistic credibility and extreme charm."

== Pedagogical contribution ==
=== Faculty of Music in Belgrade ===
Vesna Šouc is a full professor at the Conducting Department of the Faculty of Music in Belgrade and the head of that department.

=== Guest lectures ===
She was a visiting professor at Bilgi University in Istanbul (Turkey) and the Academy of Arts in Banja Luka (Republika Srpska).

== Discography and permanent recordings ==
=== CD releases ===
Vesna Šouc has recorded six CDs, three of which were released by foreign labels.

Selected CD releases by Vesna Šouc (as a classical music conductor)
Album title/Description	Orchestra	Soloists	Key works on the program	Producer/Label	Year	Source
Music of Ivan Jevtić	Novi Sad Chamber Orchestra	Eric Aubier (trumpet), Snežana Savičić (soprano)	"Que le jour est beau", "Eissplitter", 11 poems by Irène Speiser	Mandala - Harmonia Mundi (Paris)	2003	
Concert with the Belgrade Philharmonic (live)	Belgrade Philharmonic Orchestra	Konstantin Bogino (piano), Paavali Jumppanen (piano)	J. Sibelius - Finlandia Op. 26, F. Poulenc - Concerto for Two Pianos and Orchestra in D minor, G. Gershwin - Rhapsody in Blue	NATAN (Belgrade)	1999	
Gala Opera Concert with the Istanbul Symphony Orchestra (live)	Istanbul Symphony Orchestra	Eglise Gutiérrez, Burak Bilgili, Şenol Talinli, Özay and Önay Günay	Gala Opera Concert	Istanbul Symphony Orchestra	2005	

=== Permanent recordings for media ===
She has made numerous permanent recordings for domestic and foreign radio and television programs. Her official website lists recordings of concerts with the RTS Symphony Orchestra, "Dušan Skovran" Chamber Orchestra, FMU Symphony Orchestra, Bursa Symphony Orchestra, Istanbul Symphony Orchestra, as well as video recordings for Radio Television of Serbia (concerts, opera "The Fearless Boy").

== Awards, recognitions, and critical reception ==
Most significant awards and recognitions of Vesna Šouc
Award/Recognition Name	Year	Institution/Rationale	Source
Charter for exceptional long-term artistic contribution	2019	Madlenianum Opera and Theatre	
Annual Award of the Terazije Theatre	2017	For the premiere of the musical The Phantom of the Opera	
Annual Award of the Terazije Theatre	2016		
Silver Plaque of the University of Arts	2004	University of Arts in Belgrade	
Golden Badge of the Cultural and Educational Community of Serbia	1995	Cultural and Educational Community of Serbia	
October Prize of the City of Zemun	1992	For achievements in the field of music	
Student October Prize of the City of Belgrade	1992	For outstanding achievements and concert activity domestically and internationally	
"Petar Milošević" Fund Award	1990	For the best final conducting exam – concert	

Vesna Šouc's concerts and theatre performances are regularly accompanied by exceptionally positive reviews.
