= Francesco Bartolomeo Rastrelli =

Italian architect (1700–1771)

Francesco Rastrelli
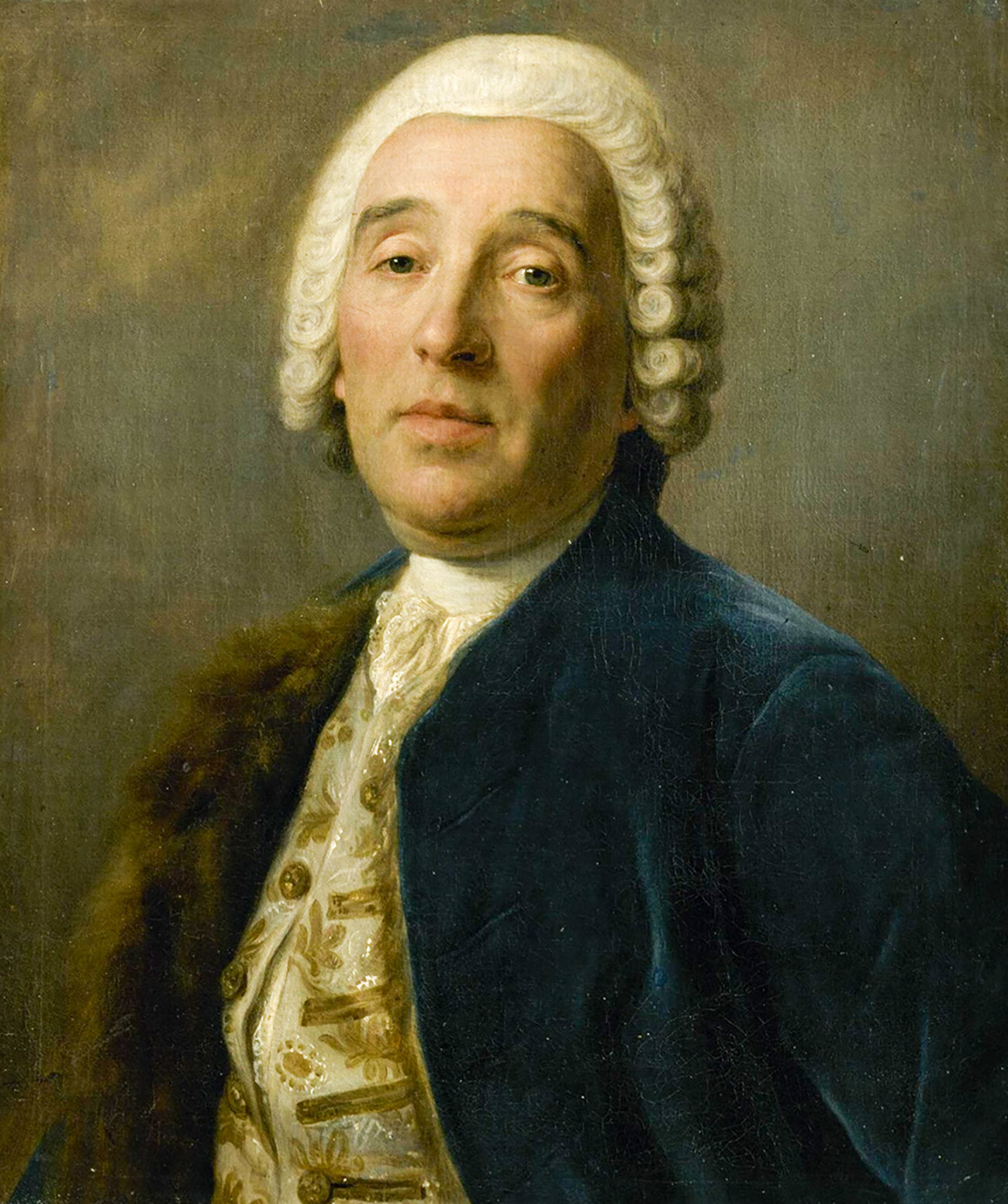
- Portrait by Pietro Rotari (1762)
- Born: 1700; Paris, France
- Died: 29 April 1771 (aged 70–71); Saint Petersburg, Russia
- Known for: Palace architecture

Francesco Bartolomeo Rastrelli (Russian: Франче́ско Бартоломе́о (Варфоломе́й Варфоломе́евич) Растре́лли; 1700 – 29 April 1771) was an Italian architect who worked mainly in Russia. He developed an easily recognizable style of Late Baroque, both sumptuous and majestic. His major works, including the Winter Palace in Saint Petersburg and the Catherine Palace in Tsarskoye Selo, are famed for extravagant luxury and opulence of decoration.

== Biography ==
Rastrelli was born in 1700 in Paris, where his father, Carlo Bartolomeo Rastrelli (1675–1744), a Florentine sculptor and architect who had trained in Rome, was active. Nothing is known about Francesco's Parisian years, but it seems certain that the young man trained and worked in his father's workshop. In 1716, Bartolomeo moved to Saint Petersburg, which became a new Russian capital just a four years before, accompanying his father. His ambition was to combine the latest Italian architectural fashion with traditions of the Muscovite Baroque style. The first important commission came in 1721 when he was asked to build a palace for Prince Demetre Cantemir, former ruler of Moldavia.

He was appointed to the post of senior court architect in 1730. His works found favour with female monarchs of his time, and he retained this post throughout the reigns of Empresses Anna (1730–1740) and Elizabeth (1741–1762).

Rastrelli's last and most ambitious project was the Smolny Convent in St. Petersburg where Empress Elizabeth was to spend the rest of her life. The projected bell-tower was to become the tallest building in St Petersburg and all of Russia. Elizabeth's death in 1762 prevented Rastrelli from completing this grand design.

The new empress, Catherine II, dismissed Baroque architecture as an old-fashioned "whipped cream", and the aged architect retired to Courland, where he supervised the completion and decoration of the ducal palaces.

His last years were spent in obscure commerce with Italian art-dealers. He was elected to the Imperial Academy of Arts several months before his death.

=== Family ===
He lived with his father and mother, and married Baroness Maria Anna von Walles, born in Berlin in 1710. She bore three children (one son and two daughters) according to the 1737 census.

While Rastrelli's son Giuseppe Iacopo died in December 1737 of cholera, and his daughter Eleonora died in January 1738, his daughter Elisabetta Caterina, born in 1734, married architect Francesco Bertogliati, her father's assistant.

== Empress Elizabeth of Russia (1741–1761) ==
Peter I's daughter was suspicious of all those who served the court of her predecessors. After going through all the architects in St. Petersburg, the Empress was convinced that Francesco Rastrelli is the best. Therefore, Francesco started serving to the Empress only in 1744.

In the period 1744–1760 he built all his famous buildings:

- Summer Palace (destroyed, built up by the Engineering Castle)
- wooden Winter Palace on the Nevsky (destroyed, urban high-rise buildings)
- stone Winter Palace (there is, the main building of the Hermitage Museum)
- Smolny Cathedral and Monastery with four churches and cells
- Palace for Chancellor Vorontsov (Vorontsov Palace in St. Petersburg, rebuilt as a military school)
- Stroganov Palace, (it is a branch of the State Russian Museum now)
- palace in Tsarskoe Selo (restored, Tsarskoe Selo (museum-reserve))
- completion and decoration of the interiors of Anichkov Palace in St. Petersburg.

== Ten extant buildings by Rastrelli ==
#	Image	Name	Location	Date
1		Rundāle Palace	Pilsrundāle near Bauska; Latvia	1736–1740; 1764–1767
2		Jelgava Palace	Jelgava; Latvia	1738–1740; 1763–1772
3		Peterhof Palace	Peterhof near St. Petersburg; Russia	1747–1755
—		Peterhof Palace chapels	Peterhof near St. Petersburg; Russia	1747–1751
4		Saint Andrew's Church	Kyiv; Ukraine	1748–1767
5		Smolny Convent	St. Petersburg; Russia	1748–1764
6		Vorontsov Palace	St. Petersburg; Russia	1749–1757
7		Catherine Palace	Tsarskoe Selo (Pushkin); Russia	1752–1756
—		Hermitage Pavilion	Tsarskoe Selo (Pushkin); Russia	1749
8		Mariinskyi Palace	Kyiv; Ukraine	1752; 1870
9		Stroganov Palace	St. Petersburg; Russia	1753–1754
10		Winter Palace	St. Petersburg; Russia	1754–1762

Boris Vipper has speculated that Rastrelli's last (and unfinished) design was for the Neoclassical Zaļenieki Manor near Mitava.

== Demolished buildings ==
#	Image	Name	Notes	Location	Date
1		Annenhof	Built of wood, replaced by Catherine Palace (Moscow)	Lefortovo District, Moscow; Russia	1731 displaced 1736 burnt down 1746
2		Anna's Winter Palace	Replaced by Winter Palace	Saint Petersburg; Russia	1732–1735 demolished 1754
3		Summer Palace	Built of wood, replaced by Saint Michael's Castle	Saint Petersburg; Russia	1741–1744 demolished 1797
4		Winter Kremlin Palace	Replaced by Grand Kremlin Palace	Moscow Kremlin; Russia	1747–1756 rebuilt 1798 demolished 1837

== Posthumous glory ==
Rastrelli is a cult figure of the Russian Baroque. His engravings with landscapes of Tsarskoe Selo were spread throughout Europe during Rastrelli's lifetime, and there are some examples in the collections of Ukraine and Germany.

- A bust of Rastrelli was installed in Tsarskoye Selo.
- The second bust of the famous architect was installed on St. Manege Square in St. Petersburg.
- A square in front of the Smolny Convent has borne Rastrelli's name since 1923.
- In 1972, the documentary Architect Rastrelli was made (directed by Maria Kligman, Lennauchfilm, Russia).
- He is the subject of a composition, Rastrelli in Saint Petersburg, written in 2000 by Italian composer Lorenzo Ferrero.
- A quartet of Russian cellists, including Kirill Kravtsov, Mikhail Degtyarev, Kirill Timofeev, and Sergei Drabkin, is called Rastrelli. The quartet works in Germany and plays music from the Baroque to modern times.

== Sources ==
- "Растрелли, итальянские художники" . Brockhaus and Efron Encyclopedic Dictionary (in Russian). 1906.
