= Jelgava Palace =

Palace in Jelgava, Latvia

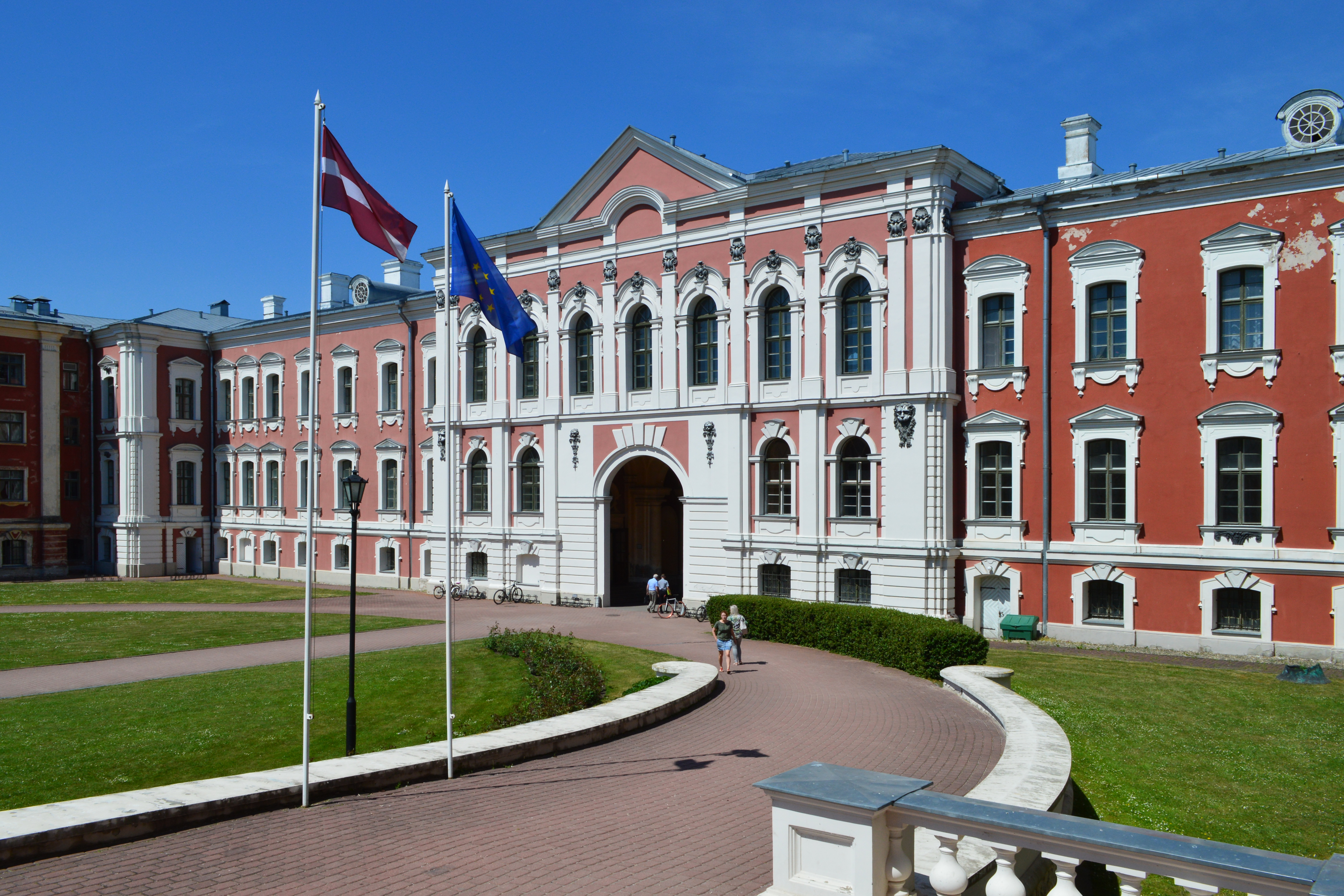

- Location within Latvia

General information
- Architectural style: Baroque
- Location: Jelgava, Latvia
- Coordinates: 56.6558°N 23.7330°E
- Construction started: 1738
- Completed: 1772
- Client: Ernst Johann von Biron

Design and construction
- Architects: Bartolomeo Rastrelli; Severin Jensen

Jelgava Palace (Latvian: Jelgavas pils) or historically Mitau Palace (Latvian: Mītavas pils, German: Schloss Mitau) is the largest Baroque-style palace in the Baltic states, located in Jelgava, Latvia. It was built in the 18th century based on the design of Bartolomeo Rastrelli as a residence for the Dukes of Courland in their capital. The Dukes of Courland also had a summer palace by Rastrelli, about 40 kilometers to the southeast, called Rundāle Palace.

== History ==
Construction of the palace started in 1738 on an island between the Lielupe river and its branches. The site had borne the residence of the former Courland dukes of the Kettler dynasty and, before that, a medieval castle belonging to the Livonian Order.

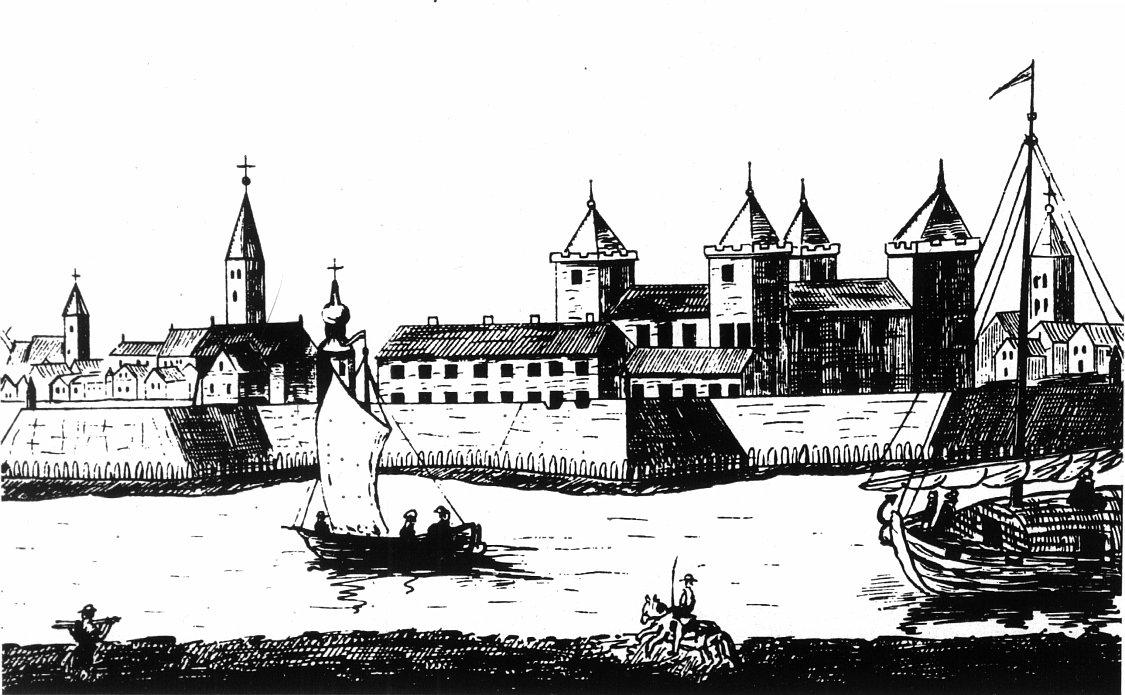
Jelgava castle prior to its destruction in the Great Northern War

Following Ernst Johann von Biron's fall from grace in 1740, all construction work was stopped, even though the roof of the palace had not yet been completed. Most of the building materials and interior elements were moved to St. Petersburg where Rastrelli used them in building of other palaces. Work resumed after Biron's return from exile in 1762. However, due to financial difficulties duke moved into palace only in 1772 although interior decorations were still in progress in many rooms. Besides Rastrelli (who, with the death of his patroness, the Empress Elizabeth, lost business in Saint Petersburg), Danish architect Severin Jensen participated in the project, giving the palace a touch of classicism.

After construction was completed in 1772, the duke lived in the palace for six months. In 1779, his successor, Peter von Biron, hosted the famous adventurer Alessandro Cagliostro in the palace. In 1788 part of the palace was damaged by fire.

After Courland was annexed by the Russian Empire in the Third Partition of Poland in 1795, the palace served as a refuge for French royalty fleeing the French Revolution. Louis XVIII of France and his family lived in the palace between 1798 and 1800. It was here that Marie Thérèse of France married Louis-Antoine, Duke of Angoulême, in 1799. Later, Louis lived incognito at the palace from 1804 until 1807. French royalty attempted to recreate the court life of Versailles at Jelgava, where many old courtiers still lived, re-establishing all the court ceremonies, including the lever and coucher (ceremonies that accompanied waking and bedding, respectively).

In the beginning of 19th. century, the palace became residence of the governor-general of Courland Governorate. For a short time in 1812, after Napoleon's invasion of Russia, the palace housed a government of the restored Duchy of Courland and Semigallia, led by Count von Medem. After the Napoleonic Wars, the palace again was occupied by the administration of the Governorate of Courland, which was situated there until 1915. In 1815, the northern part of the palace was again damaged by fire.

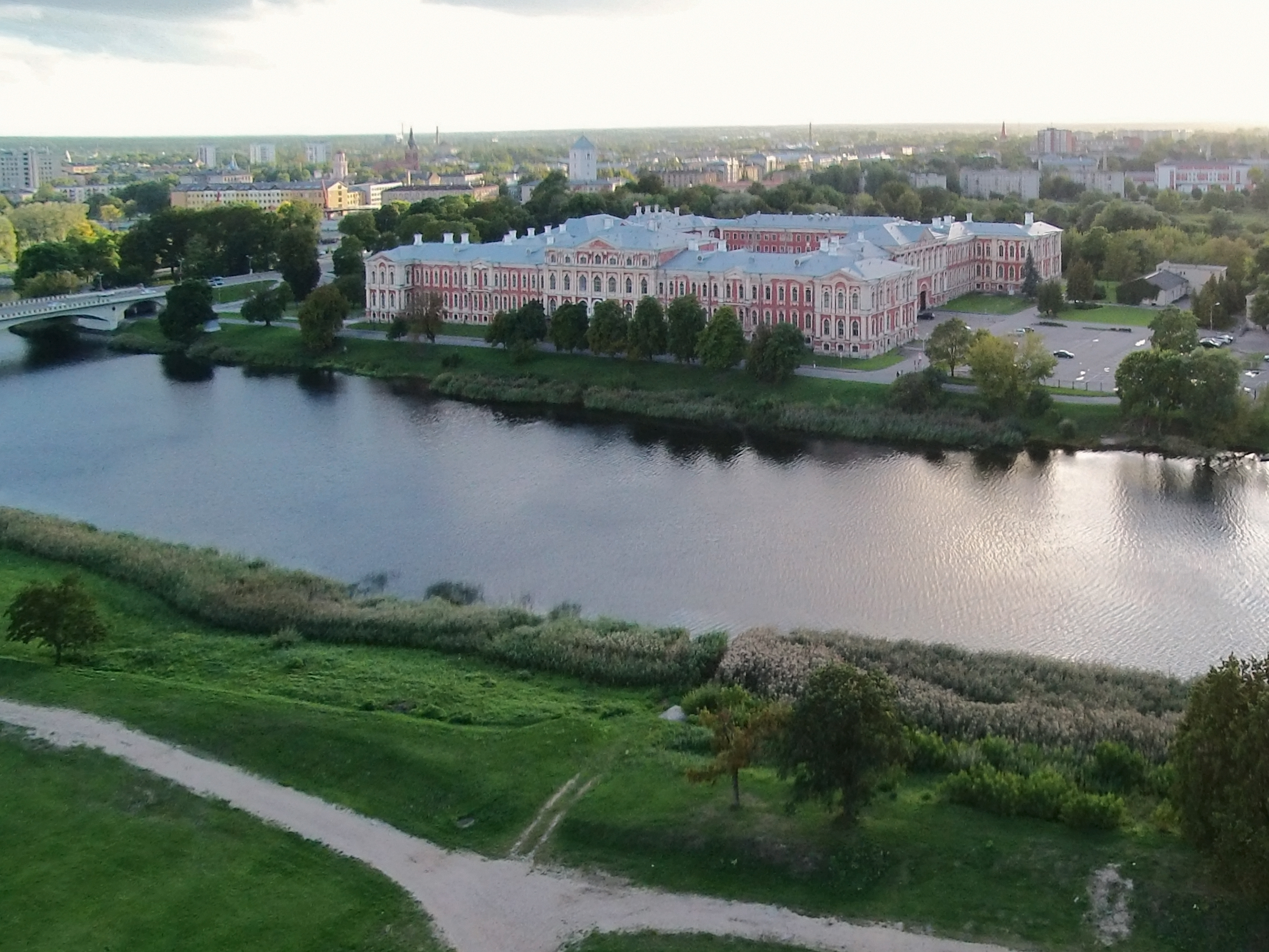
The palace in the evening

The interior decorations of the palace were destroyed in 1919 when the palace was looted and burned by the retreating West Russian Volunteer Army under the command of Pavel Bermondt-Avalov. Later, the palace became property of the Latvian Republic, and major reconstruction and restoration started. The new Jelgava Academy of Agriculture was established in the palace, opening in autumn 1939.

From 1941 until summer of 1944, the palace was a residence of Gebietskommissar von Mitau Walter von Medem. The palace suffered heavy damage in World War II, during battles for Jelgava in the summer of 1944. Like many other historical buildings in Jelgava, the palace was almost completely destroyed during heavy shelling and street fighting. The exterior of the palace was restored between 1956 and 1964, but not the interior. After restoration, the Latvia Academy of Agriculture (now the Latvia University of Life Sciences and Technologies) was again located in the palace; today it houses university administration and three faculties.

== Architecture ==
Jelgava Palace is not considered one of Rastrelli's better works. Critics note the dull facade design lacking rhythmic diversity and plastic richness which characterized Rastrelli's works in Empress Elizabeth's period. Also, atypically for Rastrelli, the palace did not feature a garden; nor was the parade yard originally closed, instead facing the urban panorama of Jelgava.

Originally, the palace consisted of two wings connected to the main building forming a U-shape. In 1937 a fourth building was added by Eižens Laube effectively closing the perimeter.

Features of special historical significance include the burial vault of the Dukes of Courland in the south-east basement. All Dukes of Courland from the Houses of Kettler and Biron were buried there between 1569 and 1791. The rooms contain 21 sarcophagi and nine wooden coffins. The crypt was relocated to the palace in 1819.

== Gallery ==
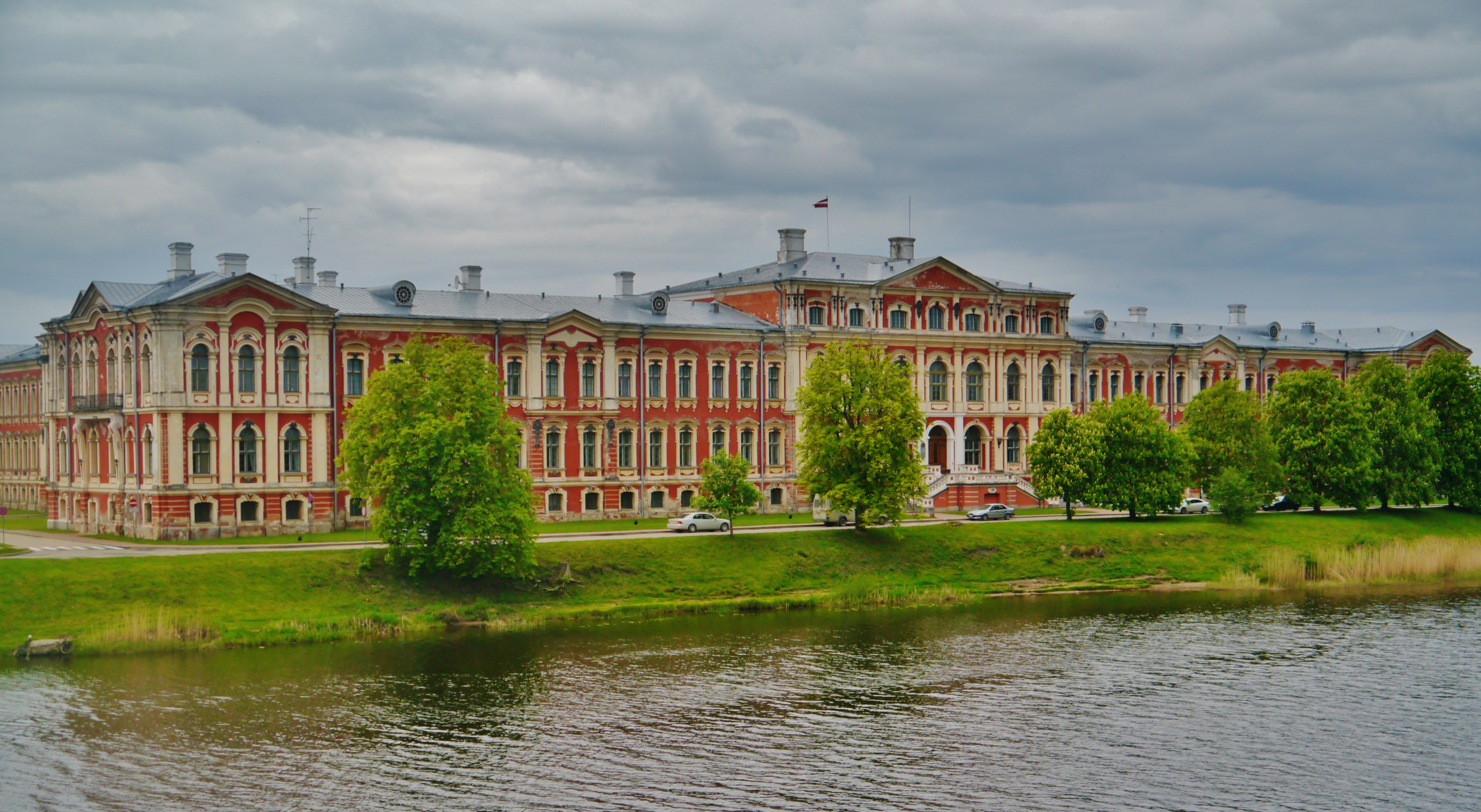
View from the river

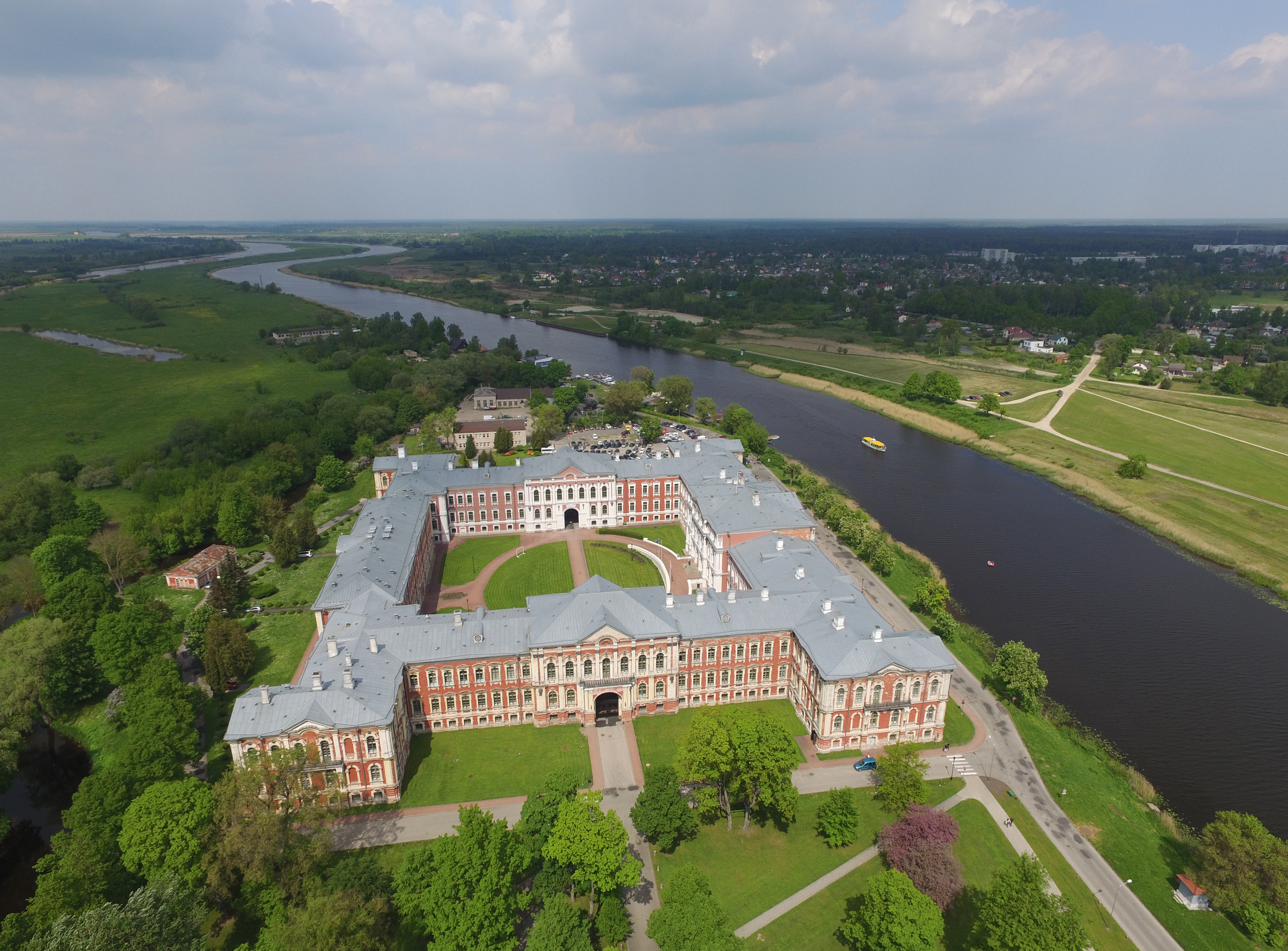
Aerial view

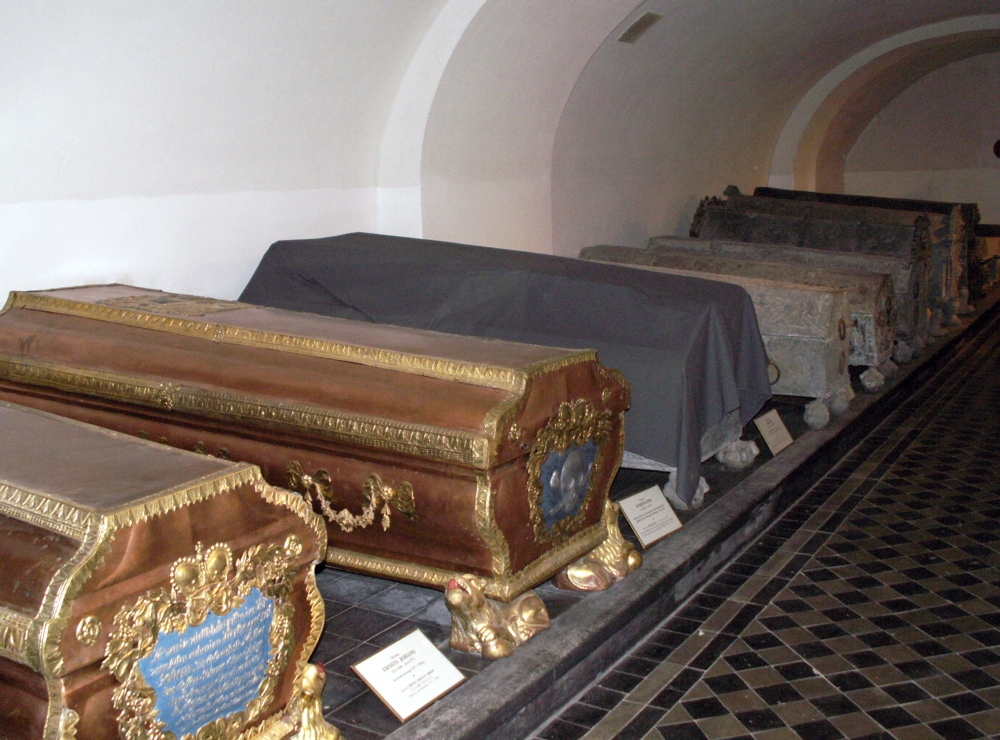
Ducal crypts

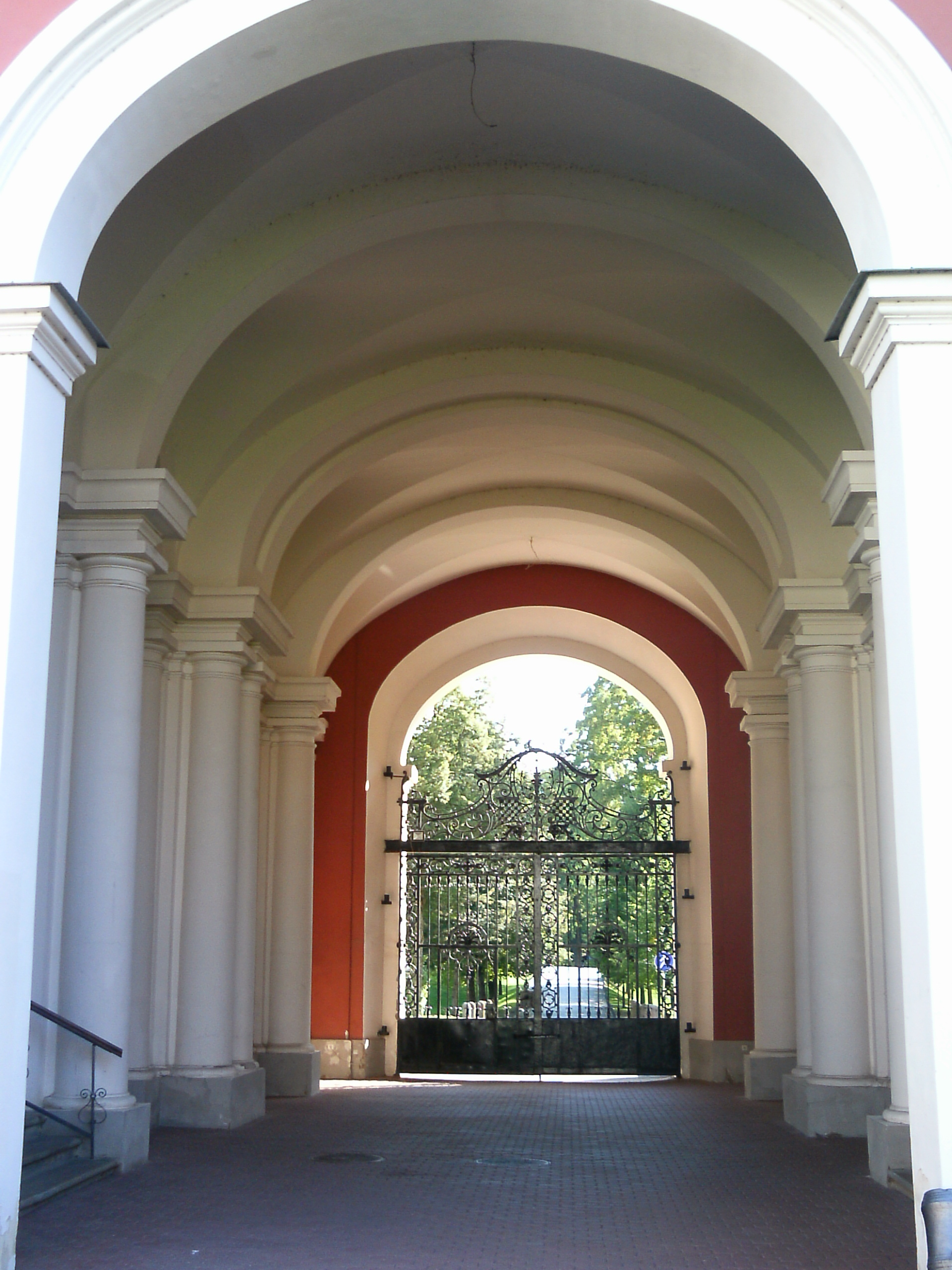
Northern gates

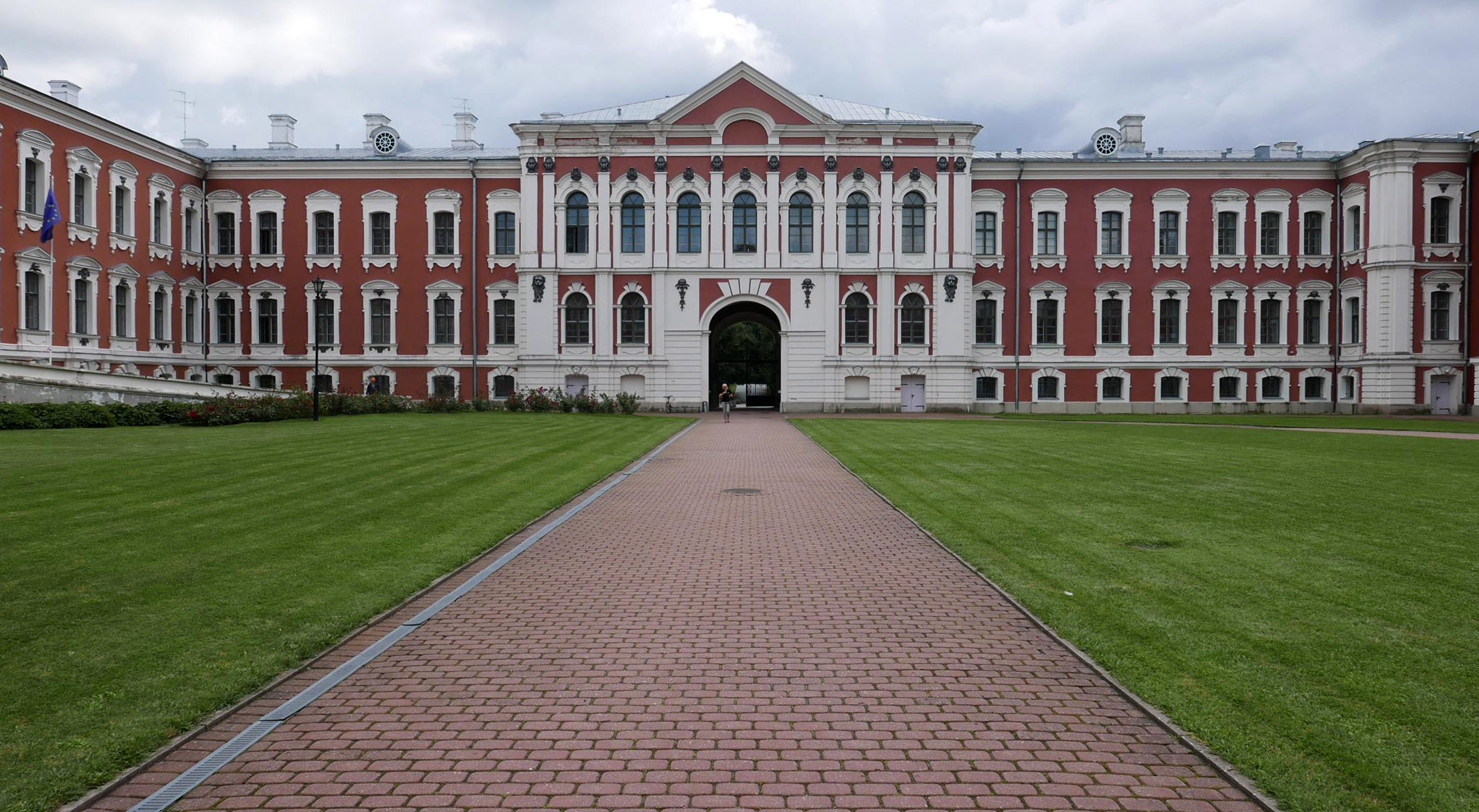
Palace courtyard

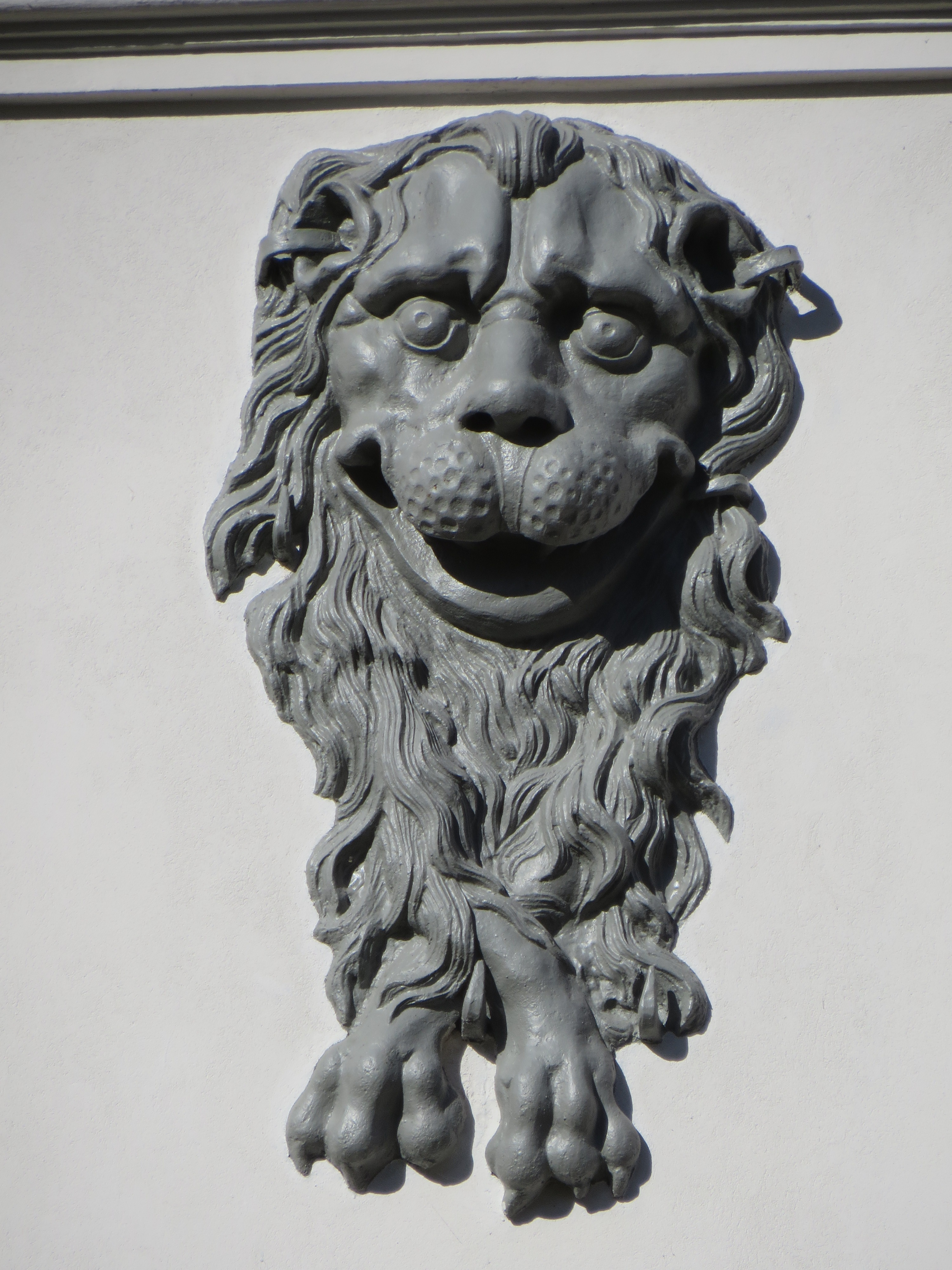
Facade detail

== See also ==
- List of Baroque residences
- List of palaces and manor houses in Latvia
