= Lefortovo District =

- District
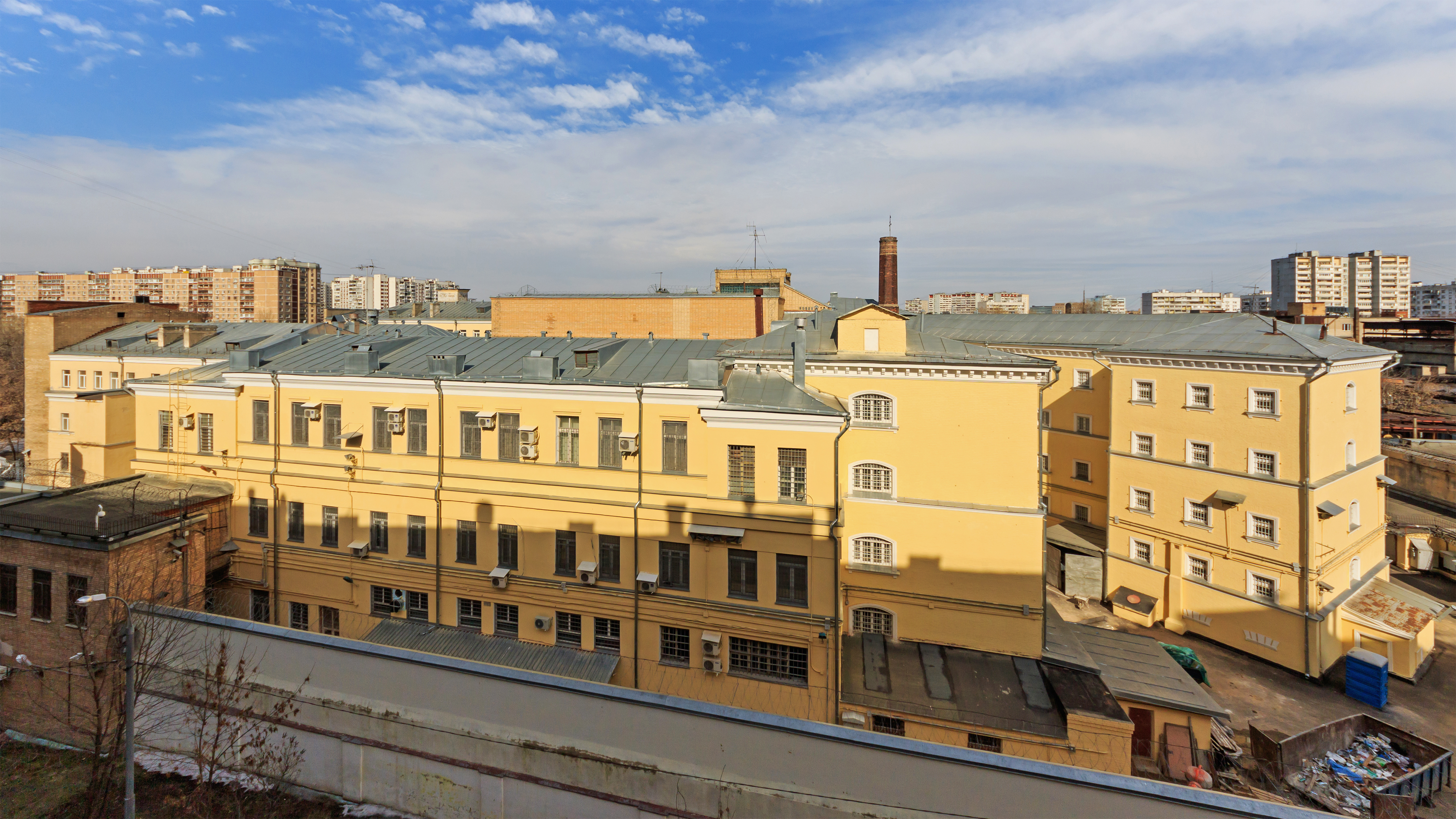
- Lefortovo Prison

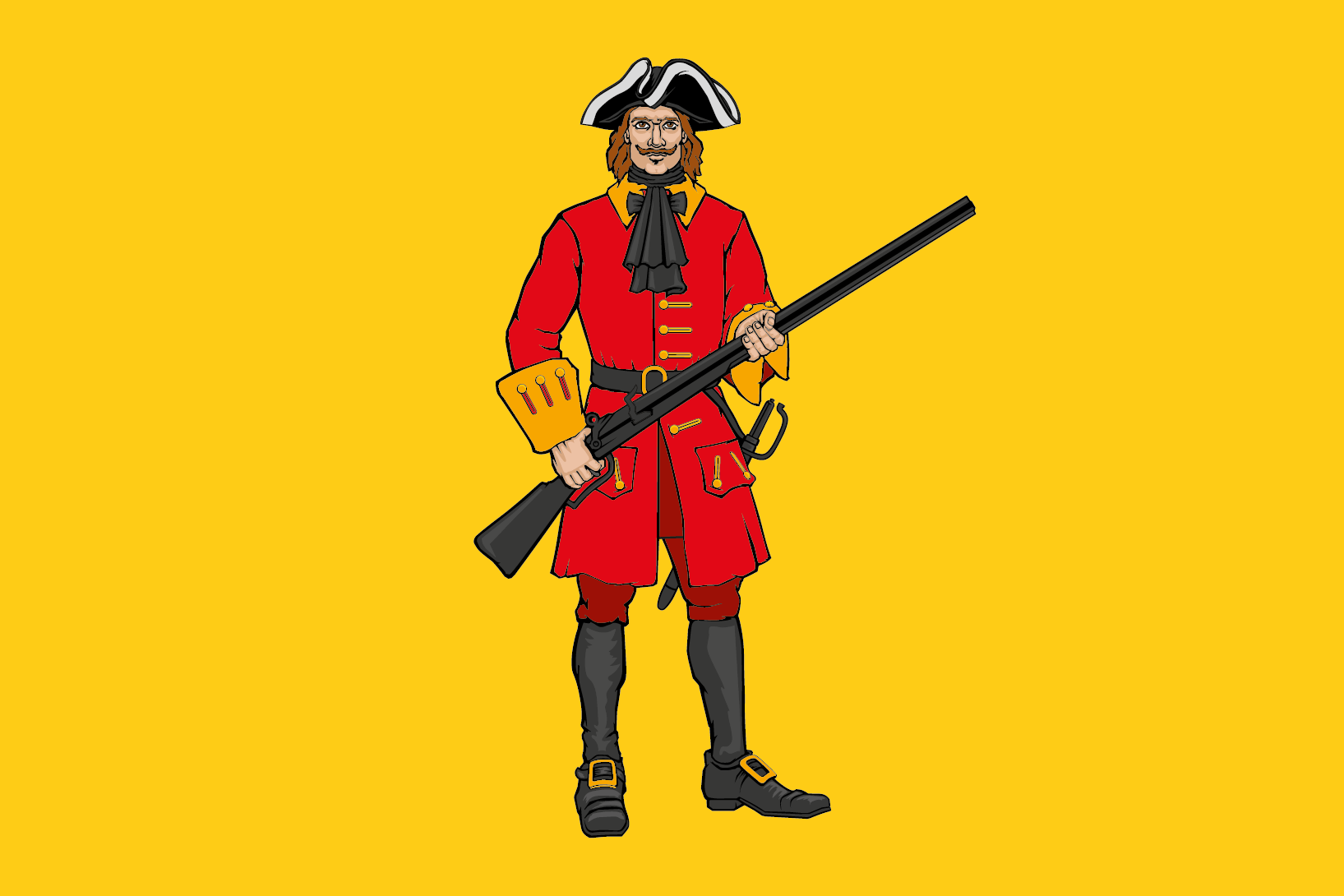
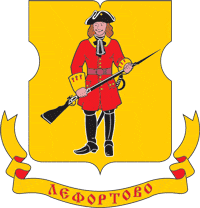
- Flag Coat of arms
- Location of Lefortovo District on the map of Moscow
- Coordinates: 55°45′54″N 37°41′29″E
- Country: Russia
- Federal subject: Moscow

Area
  - Total: 9.15 km^{2} (3.53 sq mi)

Population
  - Estimate (2010): 27,200
- Time zone: UTC+
- OKTMO ID: 45388000
- Website: https://lefortovo.mos.ru/

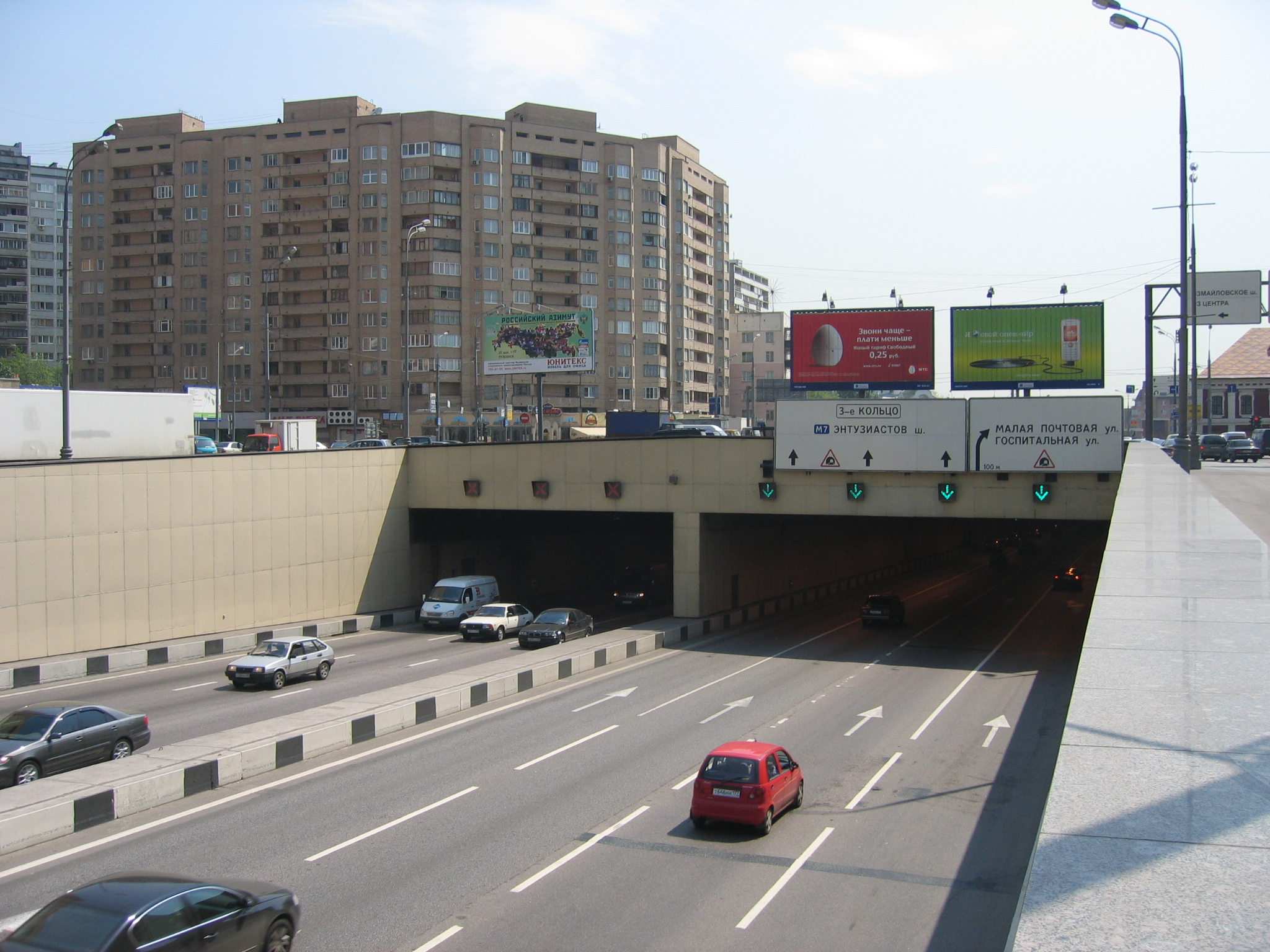
Lefortovo Tunnel

Lefortovo District (Russian: райо́н Лефо́ртово, IPA: [lʲɪˈfortəvə]) is a district of South-Eastern Administrative Okrug of the federal city of Moscow, Russia. Its area is 9.15 square kilometres (3.53 mi^{2}). Population: 91,176 (2010 census); 87,560 (2002 census).

== History ==
The Lefortovo District commemorates the name of a close associate of Tsar Peter the Great (r. 1682–1725), François Lefort (1656–1699), whose troops were stationed nearby at the German Quarter. Lefortovo is considered to have been founded in 1699. In the 18th century it was home to Annenhof, Lefortovo Palace, Sloboda Palace, and the Catherine Palace. In later centuries, the district hosted troops and military organizations, and also became heavily industrialized.

The present-day Lefortovo has a reputation for the Lefortovo Prison, Lefortovo Park and the Lefortovo Tunnel on the Third Ring. Several higher-educational institutions are located in Lefortovo, such as the Moscow Power Engineering Institute as well as the Burdenko Main Military Clinical Hospital.

== See also ==
- German Quarter
- Vvedenskoye Cemetery
