= Svēte Manor =

Manor house in Latvia

- Zemgale, Latvia
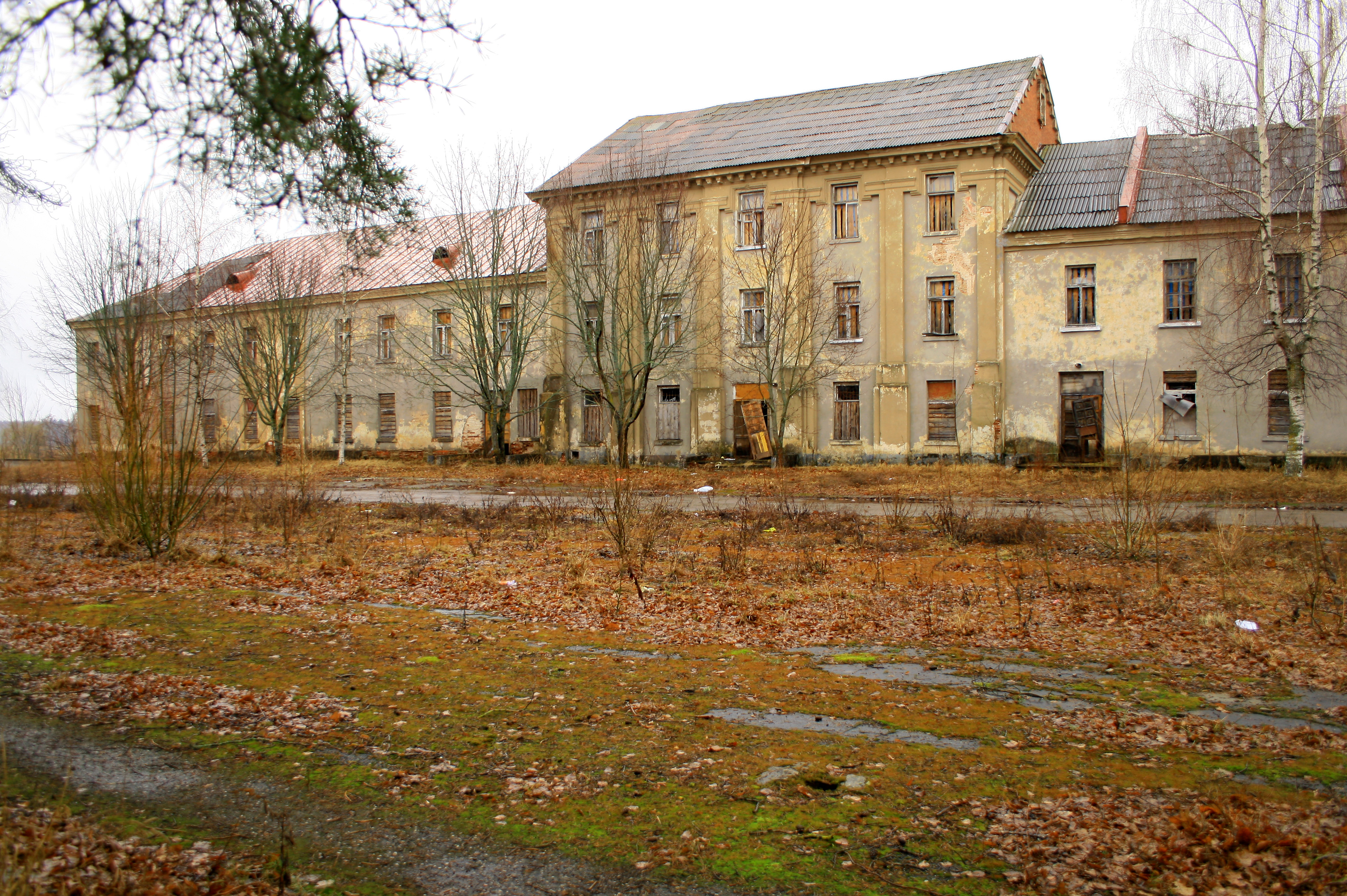

Site information
- Type: Manor

Location
- Coordinates: 56°35′30″N 23°39′46″E

Site history
- Built: Circa 1730

Svēte Manor (Latvian: Svētes muižas pils) is a manor house in the Svēte Parish of Jelgava Municipality, in the historical region of Semigallia, in Latvia.

== History ==
The manor was originally built around 1730, and extensively remodeled with new columns between 1774 and 1775 by architect Severin Jensen for use as a summer vacation residence by Duke Peter von Biron. The building was part of an army base between 1870 and 1993. It was further remodeled between 1876 and 1878 for military use. From 1993 until 2018 the building had several owners but its condition slowly worsened. In 2018 the manor building became the property of a local family who started restoration works.

== See also ==
- List of palaces and manor houses in Latvia
