= Smolny Convent =

Cathedral complex in Saint Petersburg, Russia

Coordinates: 59°56′55″N 30°23′42″E

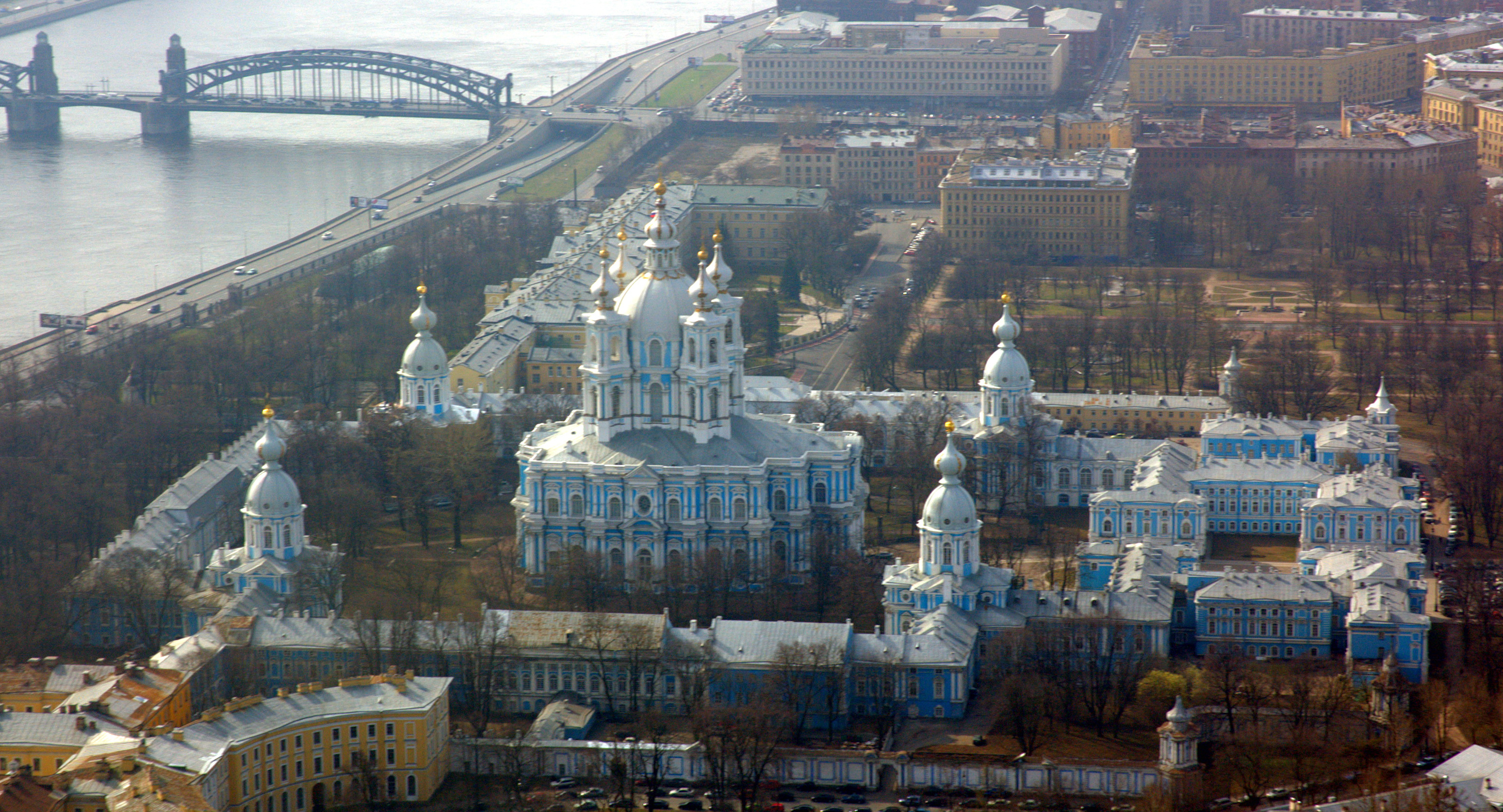
Aerial view of Smolny Convent

Smolny Convent or Smolny Convent of the Resurrection (Voskresensky, Russian: Воскресенский новодевичий Смольный монастырь), located on Ploschad Rastrelli (Rastrelli Square), on the left bank of the River Neva in Saint Petersburg, Russia, consists of a cathedral (sobor) and a complex of buildings surrounding it, originally planned as a convent.

== History ==
This Russian Orthodox convent was built to house Elizabeth, the daughter of Peter the Great. After she was disallowed succession to the throne, she opted to become a nun. However, her Imperial predecessor, Ivan VI, was overthrown during a coup d'état (carried out by the royal guards in 1741). Elizabeth decided against entering monastic life and accepted the offer of the Russian throne. Work on the convent continued with her royal patronage.

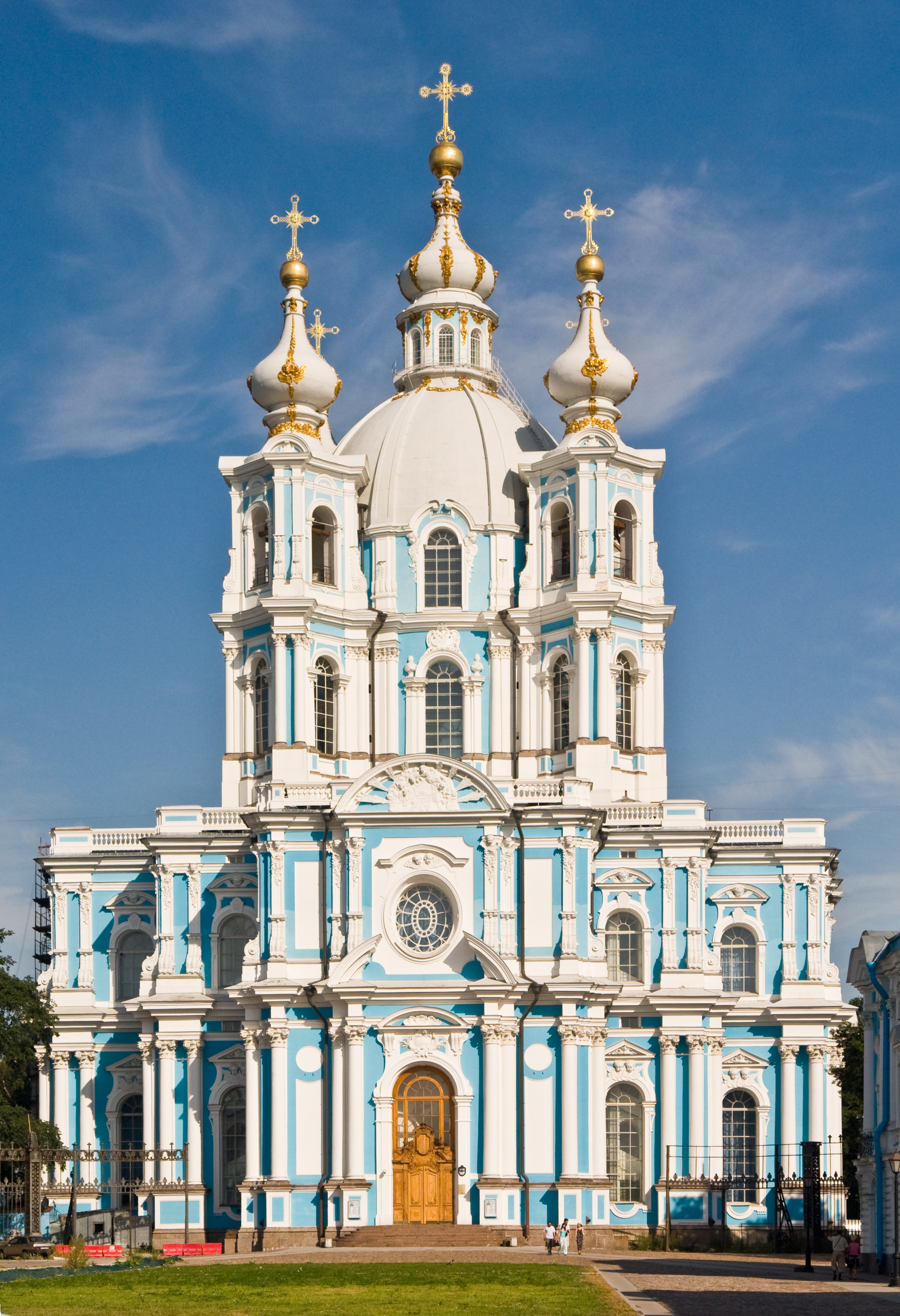
Smolny Cathedral (Sobor)

The convent's main church (catholicon or sobor), a blue-and-white building, is considered to be one of the architectural masterpieces of the Italian architect Francesco Bartolomeo Rastrelli, who also redesigned the Winter Palace, and created the Grand Catherine Palace (Yekaterininsky) in Tsarskoye Selo (Pushkin), the Grand Palace in Peterhof and many other major St. Petersburg landmarks.

The Cathedral is the centerpiece of the convent, built by Rastrelli between 1748 and 1764. The projected bell-tower was to become the tallest building in St. Petersburg and, at the time, all of Russia. Elizabeth's death in 1762 prevented Rastrelli from completing this grand design.

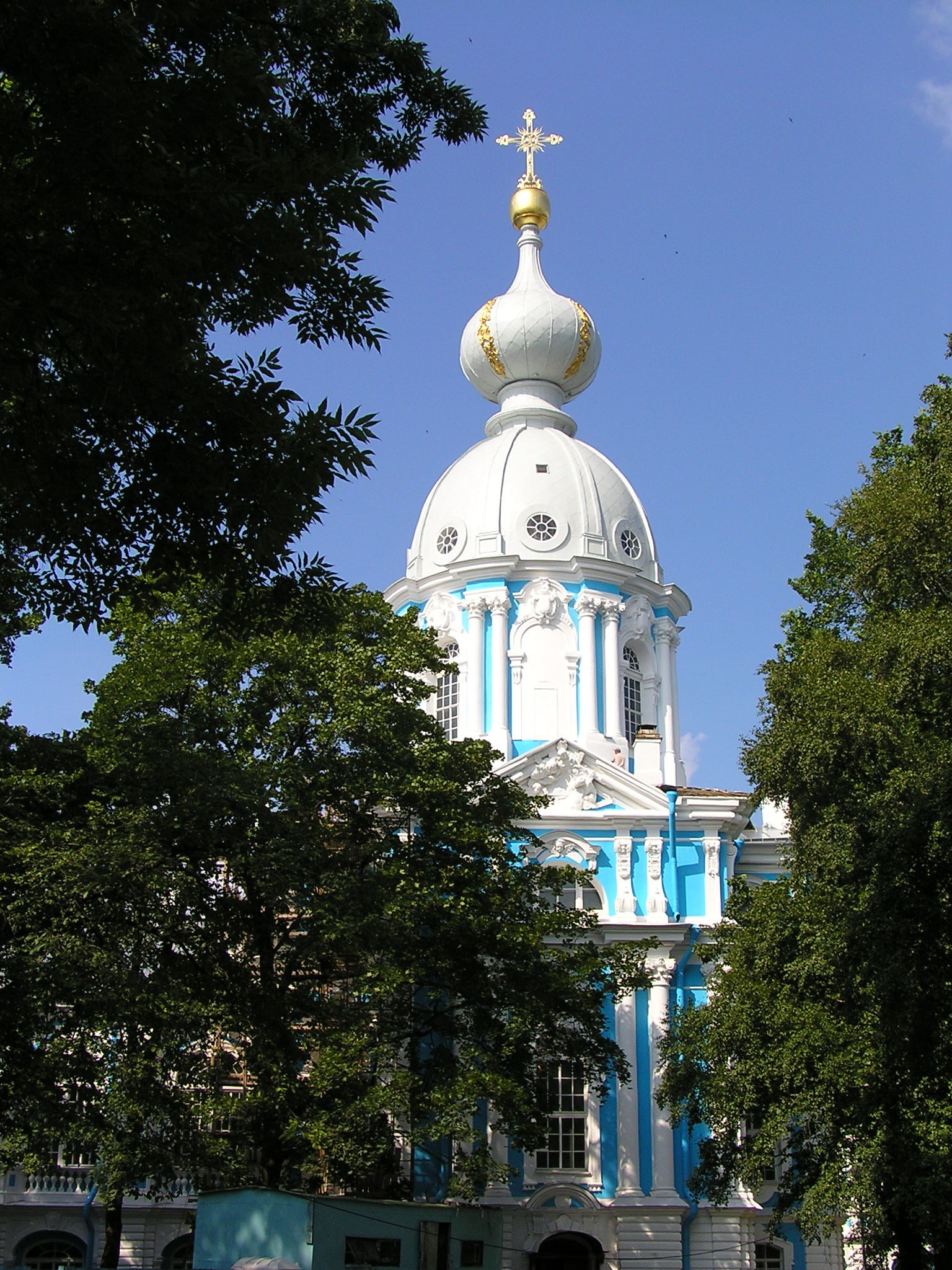
The smaller bell tower

When Catherine II assumed the throne, it was found that the new Empress strongly disapproved of the baroque style, and funding that had supported the construction of the convent rapidly ran out. Rastrelli was unable to build the huge bell-tower he had planned and unable to finish the interior of the cathedral. The building was only finished in 1835 by Vasily Stasov with the addition of a neo-classical interior to suit the changed architectural tastes at the time. The cathedral was consecrated on 22 July 1835; its main altar was dedicated to the Resurrection and the two side altars were dedicated to St. Mary Magdalene and Righteous Elizabeth.

The church was closed by the Soviet authorities in 1923. It was looted and allowed to decay until 1982, when it became a concert hall.

The faculties of sociology, political science and international relations of the Saint Petersburg State University are located in some of the buildings surrounding the cathedral.

In April 2015 Smolny Cathedral was returned to the Russian Orthodox Church, and is now an active Orthodox church, the Divine Liturgy is held daily.

The nearby Smolny Institute is named after the convent.

The name "Smolny" derives from the location. In the early days of St. Petersburg the place at the edge of the city where pitch ("smola" in Russian) was processed for use in shipbuilding and maintenance. As a result, the locale was called "smolny" – the place of pitch.

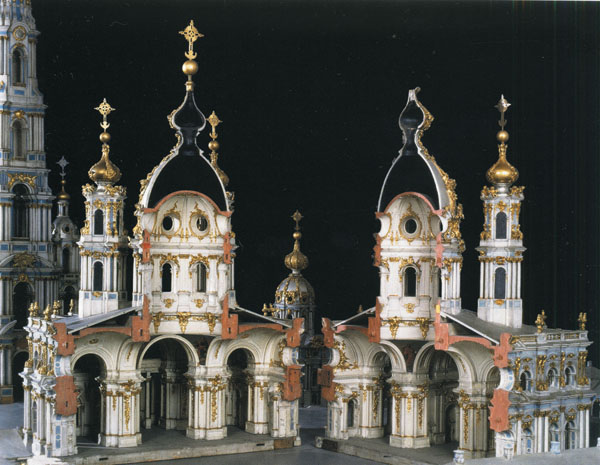
Opened model of The Smolny Cathedral

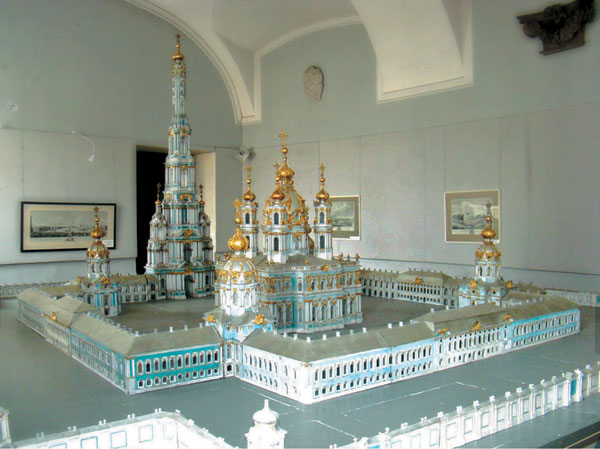
Model of The Smolny Convent
