= Zaļenieki Manor =

Manor house in Latvia

Coordinates: 56°31′51″N 23°30′30″E

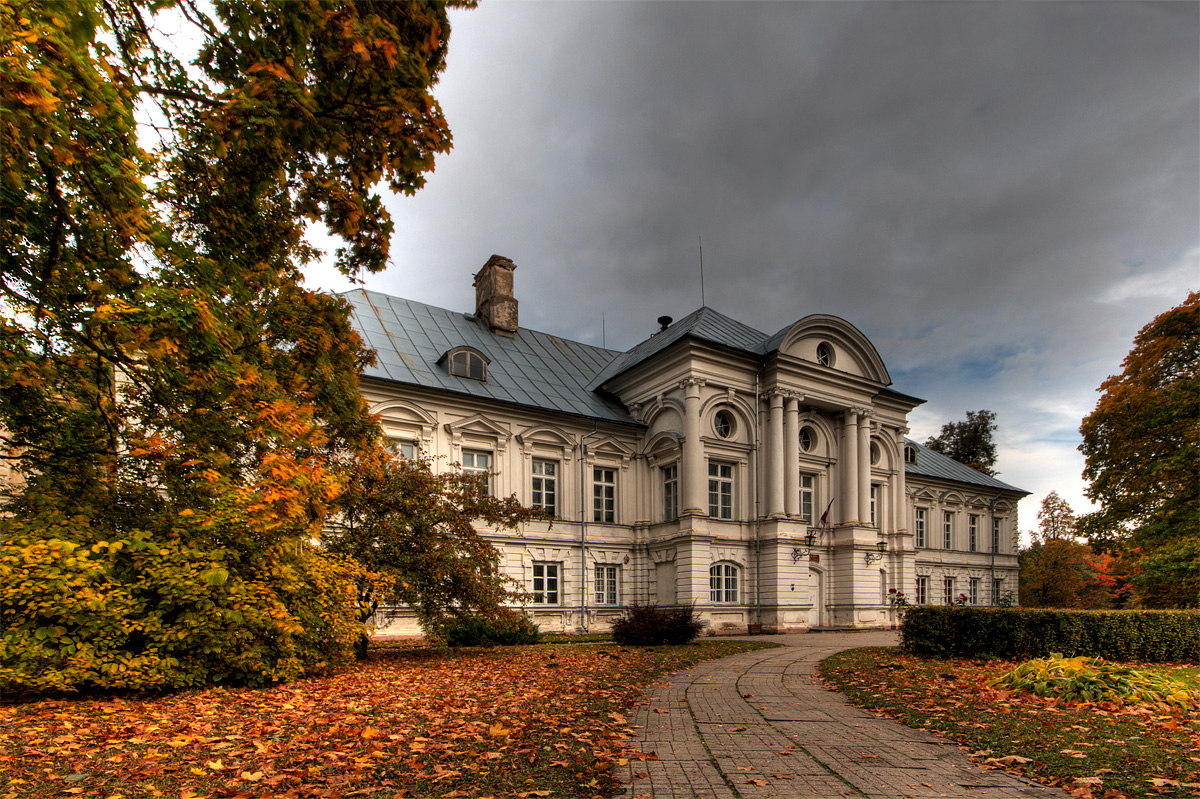
- Interactive map of the Zaļenieki Manor area

General information
- Architectural style: Baroque, Classicism
- Location: Zaļenieki Parish, Jelgava Municipality, Latvia
- Construction started: 1768
- Completed: 1775
- Client: Ernst Johann Biron

Design and construction
- Architects: Bartolomeo Rastrelli, Severin Jensen

Website
- Zaļenieki Manor

Zaļenieki Manor, also called Zaļā Manor because of the German word Grünhof, is a manor house in the Zaļenieki Parish of Jelgava Municipality in the Semigallia region of historical region of Latvia. Surrounded by a 27-hectare landscape park with ponds and lakes, it was one of the oldest properties of the Livonian Order in Semigallia. Its architecture enables the manor to be evaluated as the first and greatest early classical model in Courland.

== History ==
After the collapse of the Livonian Order in 1562, the manor became property and a popular hunting spot for Gotthard Kettler, first Duke of Courland and Semigallia. In 1766, Duke Ernst Johann von Biron signed the first order for the construction of the new manor. The initial architectural design is supposed to have been the work of Italian-born Russian architect Bartolomeo Rastrelli, who died in 1771 before completion of the project. Construction began in 1768 and finished in 1775 under the supervision of Rastrelli's Danish-born assistant Severin Jensen, which explains the influence of both Late Baroque and Classicism architecture in the completed manor house.

In 1795, when the Duchy of Courland and Semigallia was incorporated into the Russian Empire, the Russian Emperor Paul I gave Zaļenieki Manor and all the estate to his brother-in-law Alexander of Württemberg. In 1850 his sons sold the property to the landlord of Bornsminde Manor Alexis von Scheping. His wife Aleksandra Lieven of Mežotne, after her husband's death, passed the estate over to the hands of the Baltic-German Count Karl Theodor von Medem of Eleja at the end of the nineteenth century. After the Latvian agrarian reforms in 1920, the building was nationalized and turned into a vocational secondary school, which continues in operation as of today.

Restoration work under the new stucco layers in the hall and several other rooms on the second floor revealed wall paintings. The facade of the Zaļenieki Manor has not undergone any major changes since the eighteenth century. However, the interior of the manor was redesigned and refitted from 1866 to 1868. The complex used to consist of more than 30 buildings, including stables and accommodation for the servants.

== See also ==
- List of palaces and manor houses in Latvia
