= Mirko Šouc =

- Born: Mirko Šouc; June 29, 1933; Zemun, Kingdom of Yugoslavia
- Died: April 22, 2023 (aged 89); Belgrade, Serbia

Mirko Šouc (Zemun, June 29, 1933 – Belgrade, April 22, 2023) was a prominent Serbian and Yugoslav pianist, pioneering jazz accordionist, prolific composer in numerous genres, skilled arranger, and influential conductor. His career, spanning over seven decades, encompassed a wide range of musical activities through which he gained immense popularity and high esteem, decisively shaping the musical life of the Socialist Federal Republic of Yugoslavia (SFRY) from the 1950s to the 1990s. Considered one of the most active academic musicians of his time, Šouc left an indelible mark on the entire music scene.

Šouc's career, spanned more than 70 years, during which his formal musical education informed his ability to adapt to changing trends while also contributing to their development. His work across multiple musical genres reflects this breadth.

== Biography ==
=== Formative years: From Zemun wunderkind to academic musician ===
==== Early life and talent ====
Mirko Šouc was born in Zemun on June 29, 1933. He belonged to the Slovak ethnic minority. From his earliest childhood, he showed exceptional musical talent. His first professional public performance took place on September 1, 1938, when he was only five years old. As a child prodigy, he performed once a week at the Roda Theatre and at the Kolarac Endowment, either solo or with his accordion orchestra, known as the "Mirko Šouc Accordion Band" (Harmonikaška kapela Mirka Šouca). He also performed in Novi Sad, Makarska, and Split. A particularly significant event from this period was his performance at the Royal Court before King Peter II Karađorđević in 1939, on the occasion of the Materice holiday, with the entire ceremony broadcast live by Radio Belgrade.

==== Musical education and influences ====
Although he wanted to learn the accordion at the age of seven, his father, believing that the piano was "more suitable for jazz," directed him towards that instrument, and Mirko enrolled in piano at the Music School in Zemun. He crowned his formal music education in 1960 with a degree from the theoretical department of the Music Academy in Belgrade, where piano was his main subject in the class of professors Milica Marijanović and Marko Tajčević.

In his early period, his idols were classical masters like Beethoven and Mozart. However, later his lifelong role models became jazz greats: pianists Oscar Peterson and Erroll Garner, trumpeter Charlie Parker, and guitarist Barney Kessel. Other wind players like J. J. Johnson and Stan Getz also had a decisive influence on him. The secret to his authenticity on the jazz accordion, as he himself pointed out, lay in the fact that he did not listen extensively to other accordionists but drew inspiration from other instrumental spheres of jazz.

=== Instrumentalist ===
==== Pianist ====
Piano was Šouc's main instrument during his studies at the Music Academy, and he is identified as a Serbian pianist. His father's early guidance towards the piano due to its suitability for jazz laid the foundation for his later versatility. Although he gained worldwide fame primarily as an accordionist, his pianistic skill was fundamental to his entire musical creation.

==== Pioneering jazz accordionist ====
Mirko Šouc achieved international recognition as a jazz accordionist. As early as the 1960s, he was declared one of the best European jazz accordionists at a competition of soloists from European radio orchestras in Munich, at the height of the fame of the Dutch accordionist Art Van Damme. His unique style on the jazz accordion stemmed from not listening excessively to other accordionists but drawing influences from pianists, wind players, and guitarists. He released albums that highlighted his work on the accordion, such as "Harmonike Mirka Šouca" (Mirko Šouc's Accordions) (1980, PGP RTB) and "Jazz Accordion" (1988, Jugoton).

==== Versatility with other instruments ====
In addition to piano and accordion, Šouc also played the melodica and harpsichord as a soloist on his jazz albums and performances. The album "Harmonike Mirka Šouca" explicitly states that he played accordion, melodica, and harpsichord. His choice to include instruments like the harpsichord and melodica in jazz attests to an experimental approach.

=== Conducting work ===
==== Mirko Šouc Ensemble ====
In 1953, Mirko Šouc founded two ensembles, of which the "Mirko Šouc Ensemble" (Ansambl Mirka Šouca) became particularly famous. This ensemble performed over a thousand concerts domestically and internationally and made several hundred permanent recordings for radio archives. He also performed under the name "Mirko Šouc Orchestra" (Orkestar Mirka Šouca). One of the recorded compositions, "U susret oblacima" (Meeting the Clouds), was performed with the "Mirko Šouc Ensemble, 5 accordions and harpsichord."

==== Conductor of Radio Television Belgrade (RTB) orchestras ====
After graduating in 1960, Šouc began working in the ensembles of Radio Belgrade, where he acted as an instrumentalist, conductor, composer, and arranger. He was the conductor of the RTB Entertainment Orchestra and the Grand National Orchestra of RTB. Many prominent jazz musicians gained their first experiences in the ensembles led by Šouc before moving on to the RTB Big Band.

==== Conductor at the Terazije Theatre ====
Mirko Šouc conducted over 100 performances at the Terazije Theatre in Belgrade. One specific example of his work at this theatre is the musical "Andra i Ljubica" (Andra and Ljubica) from 1981, where he was the conductor. His daughter, Vesna Šouc, also became a conductor at the same theatre.

== Compositional and arrangement work ==
Mirko Šouc was one of the most prolific and versatile composers and arrangers on the Yugoslav music scene. His opus includes over 200 compositions of various musical genres and approximately as many arrangements and co-authored works registered with SOKOJ (Organization of Music Authors of Serbia).

=== Jazz compositions ===
He is considered one of the founders and most famous composers of jazz music in these regions. His jazz compositions are recorded on three jazz albums, on which he was also the arranger and conductor. His contribution to jazz was crowned with the Nišville Jazz Festival Lifetime Achievement Award.

=== Popular music ===
As a composer of popular music, he first appeared at the First Belgrade Festival of Popular Music. Throughout his long composing career, he won at many popular music festivals across Yugoslavia. He composed numerous hits for popular soloists of the time, including songs like "Put koji tražim" (The Road I Seek) and "Tražiš" (You Seek) for Nada Knežević, "Malo mesta za nas" (Little Room for Us) for Senka Veletanlić, "Ja sam kriv" (I Am to Blame) for Živan Milić, and "Poznao sam te" (I Recognized You) for Krsta Petrović. The song "Put koji tražim," performed by Krsta Petrović, was part of the Belgrade Spring Festival in 1961.

=== Children's music ===
Mirko Šouc also left a significant mark on children's music. His most famous work in this genre is the song "Zakleo se bumbar" ("The Bumblebee Swore an Oath"), performed by Dragan Laković, which became one of the most beloved children's songs. The lyrics for this song were written by Radivoje Đurović. He also released three CDs of children's music. His collaboration with Branko Milićević (Branko Kockica) on the release "Sanjalica Maca" (Maca the Dreamer) (1985) further solidified his position.

=== Music for film, television, and radio ===
Šouc's compositional activity also included music for film, radio, and TV dramas and series. He composed music for the film Na mesto, građanine Pokorni! (Take Your Place, Citizen Pokorni!) from 1964.

=== Starogradske pesme (Old town songs) and music inspired by folklore ===
He nurtured and composed music in the spirit of old town songs. In this genre, he released a CD Najlepše pesme o Zemunu (The Most Beautiful Songs About Zemun) (in collaboration with Jovan Ljubinković Puba, 2006). He also composed popular kolos (traditional circle dances) such as "Zemunsko kolo" (Zemun Kolo), "Alasko kolo" (Fisherman's Kolo) and "Gardoško kolo" (Gardoš Kolo).

=== Key collaborations ===
As a composer and arranger, Mirko Šouc collaborated with numerous prominent Yugoslav vocal soloists. Besides those already mentioned, these include Mirjana Beširević ("Čovek nikad nije sam" - Man is Never Alone), Dušan Jakšić ("Mala" - Little One), Mirko Cetinski ("Skopjanka" - Girl from Skopje, "Kad stigne jesen" - When Autumn Arrives, "Molin dragu" - Pleading with my Sweetheart), and Lado Leskovar ("Zovi me telefonom" - Call Me on the Phone). His work continues to inspire later generations of musicians, as evidenced by the album "Tribute to Mirko Šouc" by jazz singer Katarina Kačunković.

== Discography ==
Mirko Šouc's discography attests to his versatility. His recordings were released on long-play records, cassettes, and compact discs by leading record labels such as PGP RTB/RTS and Jugoton.

Selected discography of Mirko Šouc
Title	Year	Label	Format	Mirko Šouc's role
Harmonike Mirka Šouca (Mirko Šouc's Accordions)	1980	PGP RTB	LP	Performer (accordion, melodica, harpsichord), composer
Sanjalica Maca (Maca the Dreamer) (with Branko Kockica)	1985	PGP RTB	LP, Cassette	Composer, performer
Starogradske Pesme (Old Town Songs) (with VNO RTB)	1988	PGP RTB	Cassette	Performer, arranger/conductor (implied)
Jazz Accordion	1988	Jugoton	LP	Performer (accordion), composer
Step By Step	1998	PGP RTS	CD, Compilation	Composer, performer (featured)
Najlepše Pesme O Zemunu (The Most Beautiful Songs About Zemun) (with J. Lj. Puba)	2006	PGP RTS	CD, Compilation	Performer, composer

Source for table: Numerous of his compositions and recordings are available on other platforms as well.

== Awards and recognitions ==
Throughout his decades-long career, Mirko Šouc received numerous significant accolades:

- **Nišville Jazz Festival Lifetime Achievement Award** (2010): Awarded for his entire life's work, with special emphasis on his three jazz albums.
- **Recognition in Munich** (1960s): Named one of the best European jazz accordionists at a competition of soloists from European radio orchestras.
- **Order of Labour with Golden Wreath**: High state decoration of SFRY.
- **National Pension for Contribution to Culture**: He was among the first recipients of this recognition in Serbia.

In addition to these, he received over thirty other prestigious awards, charters, and certificates of appreciation at various festivals and music events throughout former Yugoslavia.

=== Festival success ===
Mirko Šouc first appeared as a composer at the First Belgrade Festival of Popular Music and won at many festivals throughout his long career. His song "Put koji tražim" (The Road I Seek), performed by Krsta Petrović, was presented at the Belgrade Spring Festival in 1961. Although his composition "Ona je najlepša bila" (She Was the Most Beautiful), performed by Krsta Petrović, did not win at the Opatija Festival in 1961, it was among the favorites.

== Influence and memberships ==
Šouc's influence extends to generations of musicians who came after him. Many prominent Yugoslav jazz musicians, such as Lala Kovačev, Đino Maljoković, Milivoje Mića Marković, Zvonimir Skerl, and Aleksandar Korać, gained their first experiences and successes in the ensembles led by Mirko Šouc before becoming members of the RTB Big Band.

He was a member of the Association of Composers of Serbia since 1955 and a member of the Association of Jazz Musicians since its founding in 1953.

== Legacy ==
Mirko Šouc died on April 22, 2023, in Belgrade. As colleagues and friends emphasized at the commemoration, his music and performances "marked Serbian and Yugoslav life in the second half of the 20th century." His wide range of genres mastered means his legacy is not confined to one niche but forms part of the diverse soundtrack of life for several generations in the region.
