= Pilsrundāle =

Village in Latvia

- Village
- Pilsrundāle's location in Latvia
- Coordinates: 56°25′12″N 24°00′35″E
- Country: Latvia
- Municipality: Bauska
- Parish: Rundāle
- First mentioned: 1280

Population (2006)
  - Total: 862
- Postal code: LV-3921

Pilsrundāle is a village in the Rundāle Parish of Bauska Municipality in the Semigallia region of Latvia, approximately 40 kilometres from Jelgava. Pilsrundāle had 862 residents as of 2006. Rundāle Palace is located in Pilsrundāle.
