= Catherine Palace (Moscow) =

Former royal residence in Moscow

Coordinates: 55°45′39.78″N 37°41′46.49″E

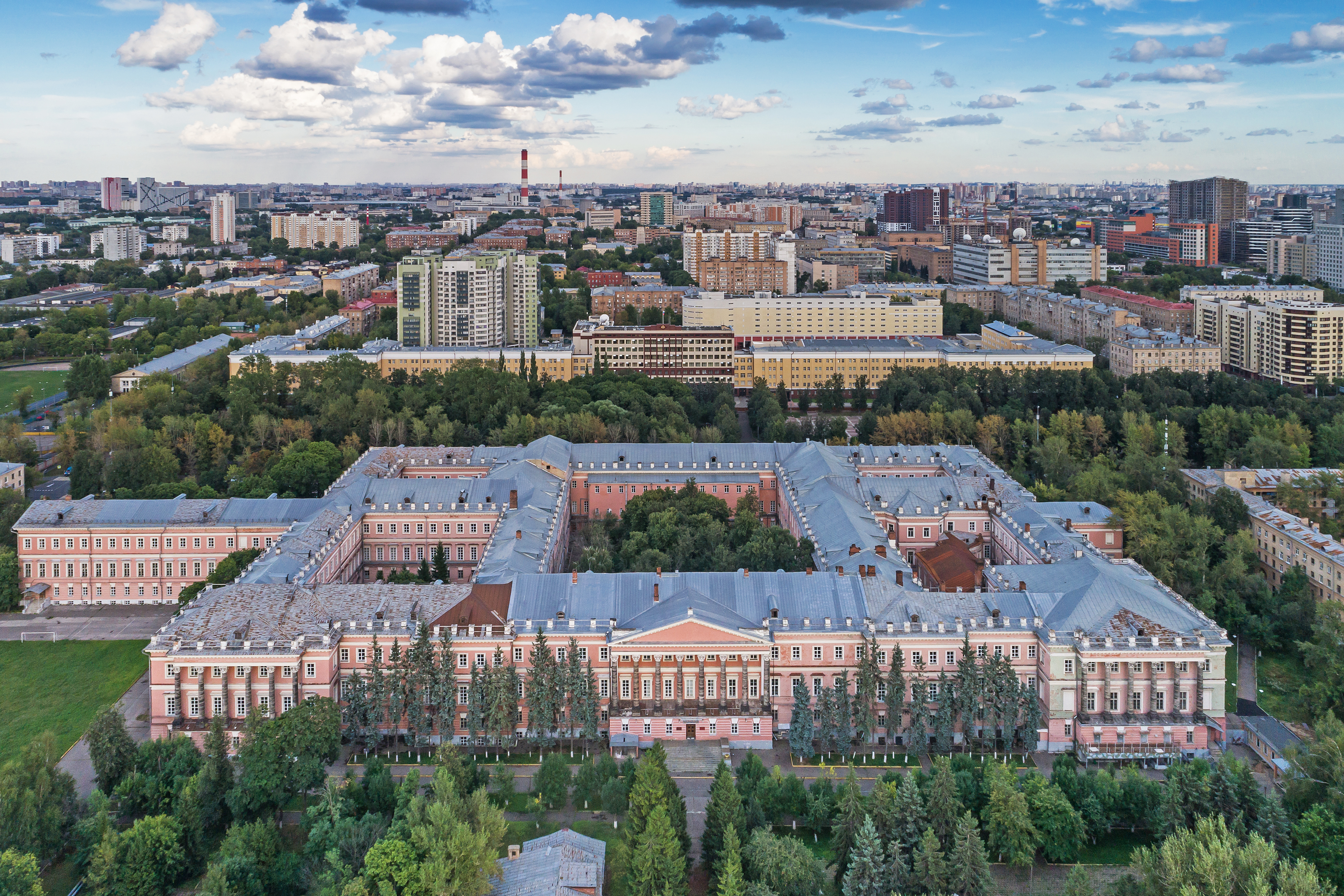
The Catherine Palace in Moscow

The Catherine Palace (Russian: Екатерининский дворец) is a Neoclassical residence of Catherine II of Russia on the bank of the Yauza River in Lefortovo, Moscow. It should not be confused with the much more famous Catherine Palace in Tsarskoye Selo.

The residence is also known as the Golovin Palace, after its first owner, Count Fyodor Golovin, the first Chancellor of the Russian Empire. After his death Empress Anna commissioned Francesco Bartolomeo Rastrelli to replace the Golovin Palace with a Baroque residence known as Annenhof. This was Anna's preferred residence. It consisted of two wooden two-storey buildings, the Summer Palace and the Winter Palace.

Annenhof was abandoned after a fire in 1746. Catherine II, who found both edifices rather old-fashioned and dilapidated, ordered their demolition in the 1760s. After 1773 Karl Blank, Giacomo Quarenghi and Francesco Camporesi were the architects employed to supervise the construction of a Neoclassical residence in Lefortovo. Emperor Paul, known for his dislike of his mother's palaces, converted the residence into barracks.

After Napoleon's occupation of Moscow in 1812 the Catherine Palace was restored under the supervision of Osip Bove. It has since been occupied by the Moscow Cadet Corps, Malinovsky Tank Academy and other military institutions and has generally been inaccessible to the public at large. In October 1917 the Moscow cadets mounted a fierce resistance against the Bolsheviks in Lefortovo. What little remained of the Annenhof Park was largely destroyed by the 1904 Moscow tornado.

== Lefortovo Park ==
The palace park was laid out in 1703, in Soviet times unofficially named Lefortovsky after François Le Fort. The regular planning of the park has been preserved since the time of Peter the Great. The main alleys, the Golovinsky Pond, and the Cross Pond have been restored, near which there is now a dilapidated Grotto from the end of the 18th century - a stone retaining wall with columns and niches. The gazebo nearby was built in the early 20th century. The total area of the manor house is 65.5 hectares. Entrance to the park is free. The palace and the area closest to it are still under the jurisdiction of military structures and are closed to the public.

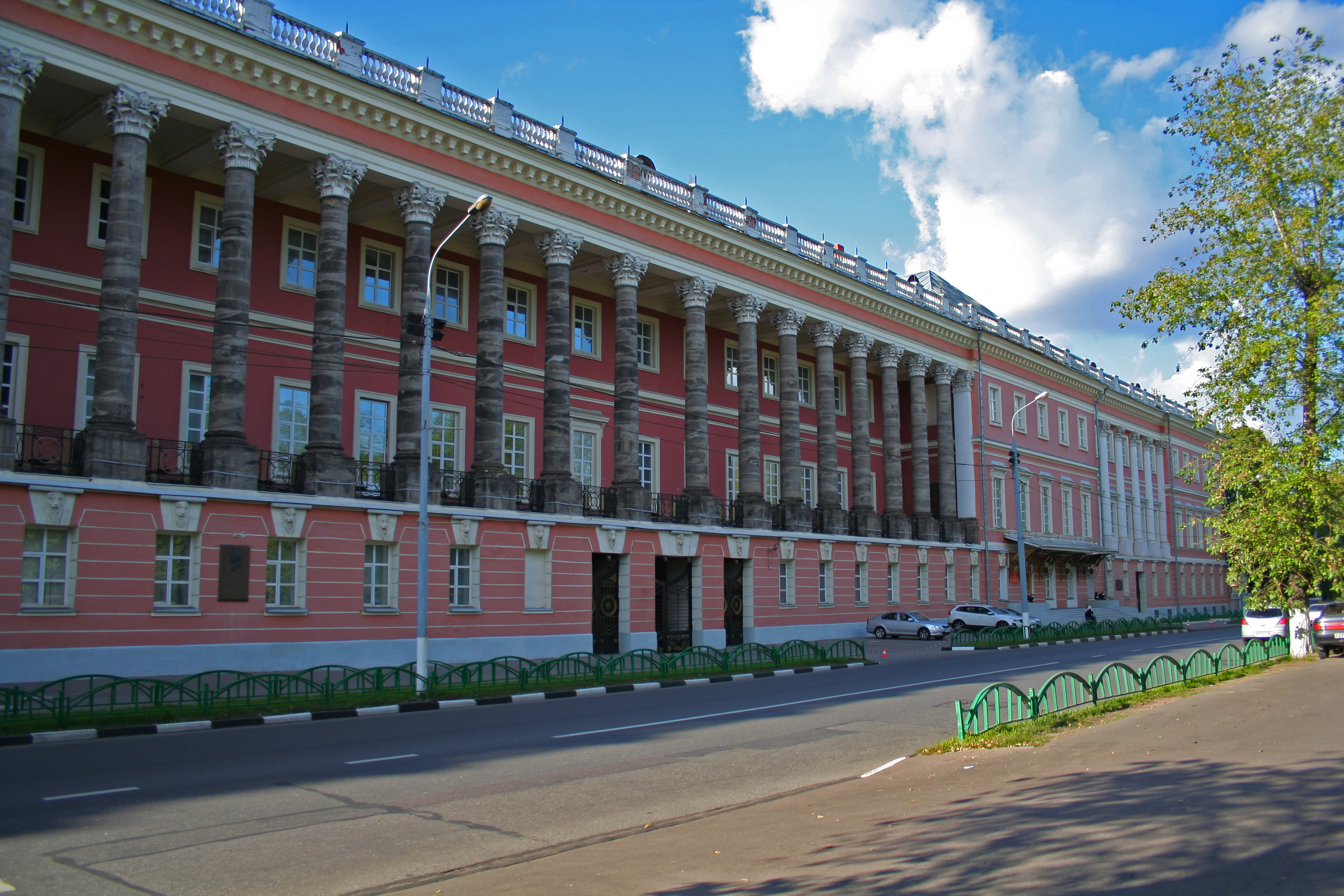
Moscow's longest colonnade consists of 16 dark columns set in a loggia

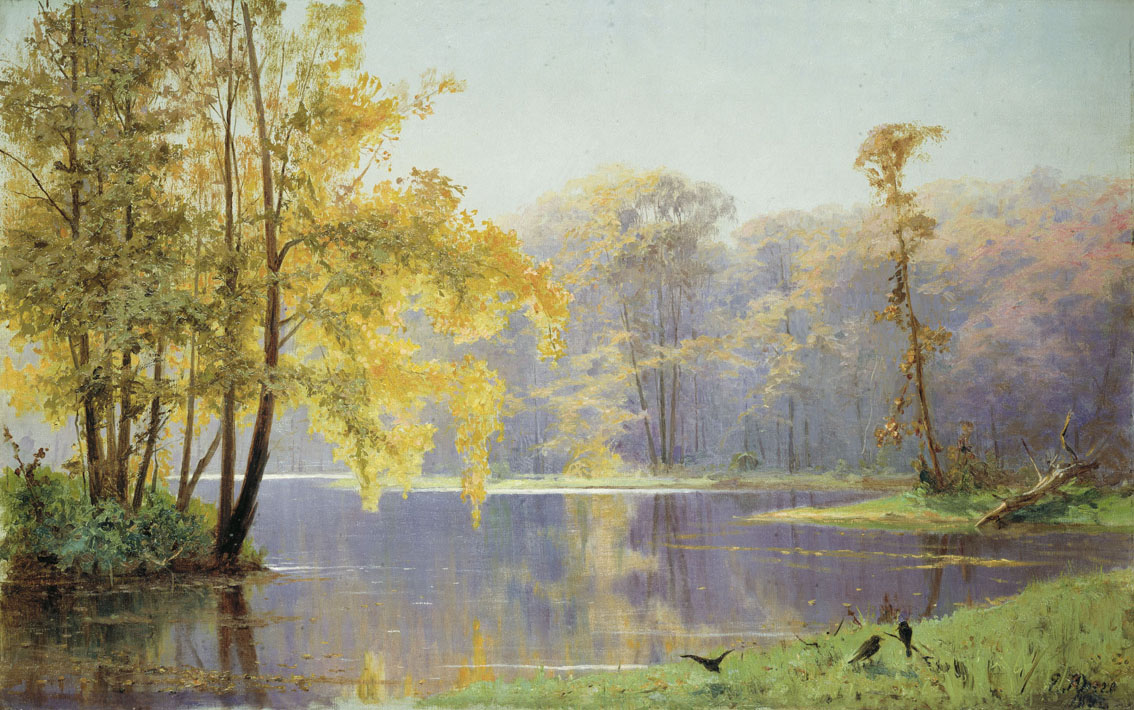
Lefortovo Park in 1892

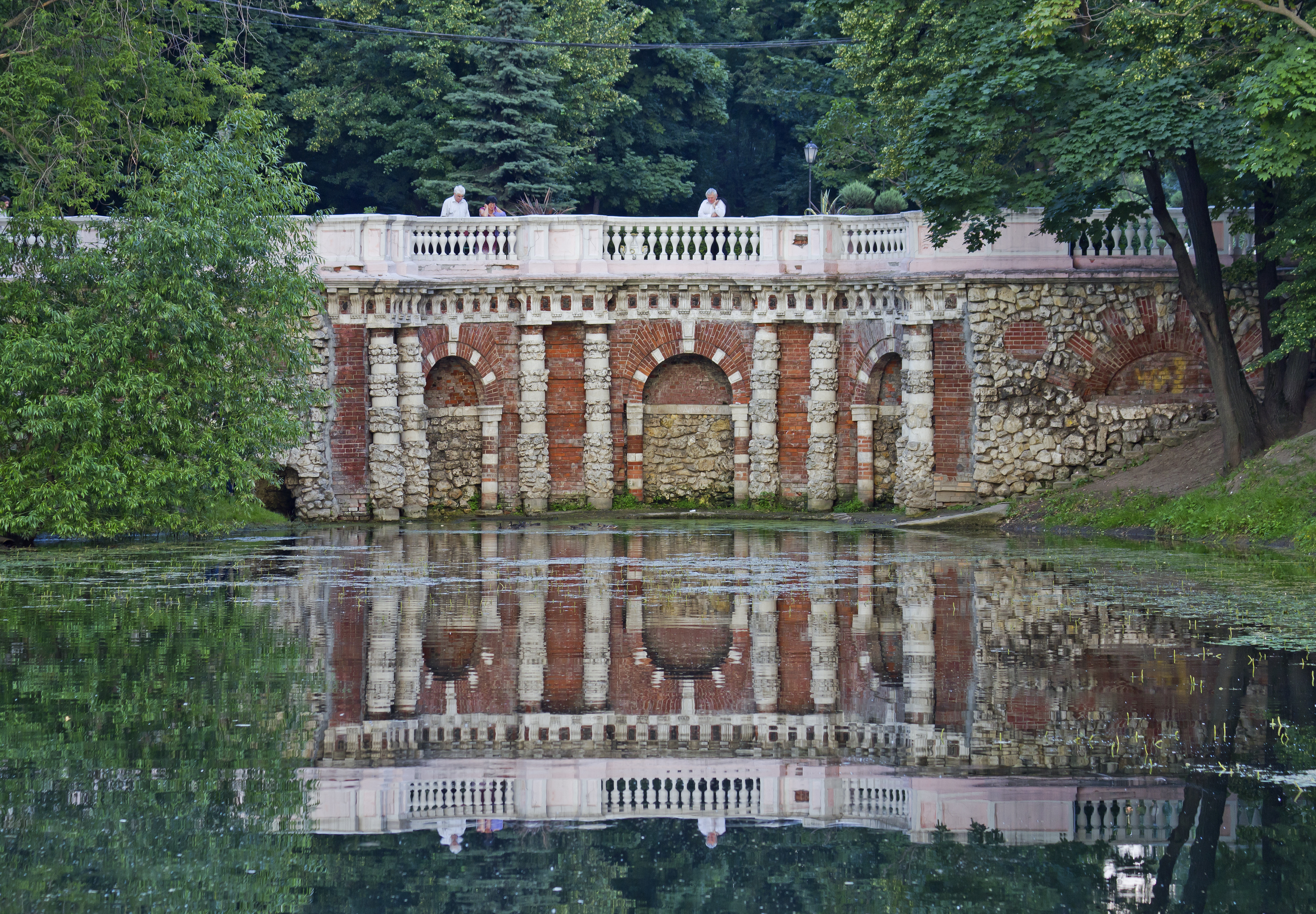
An 18th-century grotto
