= Annenhof =

Coordinates: 55.7614°N 37.6953°E

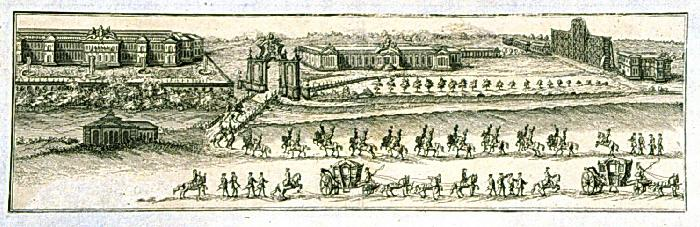
Annenhof: the two-storey Annenhof Summer Palace to the left and the one-storey Annenhof Winter Palace to the right, side by side at Lefortovo after 1736.

Annenhof was the name of two separate imperial palaces in Moscow in Russia, known as the Annenhof Winter Palace and Annenhof Summer Palace, both of them designed by Bartolomeo Rastrelli and built in 1730–1731 on the order of Empress Anna of Russia. They served as the residence of Anna and her court, as Anna preferred Moscow to Saint Petersburg.

== Annenhof Winter Palace ==
The Annenhof Winter Palace was constructed in the city of Moscow not long from the Kremlin. It was a one-storey wooden building. It had a central building with very large rooms, among them a throne room, and two wings. This was Anna's preferred winter residence.

In 1736, the Annenhof Winter Palace was moved to Lefortovo outside of Moscow and placed beside the Annenhof Summer Palace, essentially forming one palace. The palace burnt down in 1753, which is described in the memoirs of Catherine the Great. It was rebuilt in just six weeks. The palace burnt down for the last time in 1771 and was not rebuilt again. The Annenhof Summer Palace beside it had then already been torn down.

== Annenhof Summer Palace ==
The Annenhof Summer Palace was constructed at Lefortovo outside of Moscow. In 1730, Empress Anna commissioned Francesco Bartolomeo Rastrelli construct a Baroque residence known as Annenhof. It was also known as the Golovin Palace, after the previous owner of the site on which it was built, Count Fyodor Golovin, the first chancellor of the Russian Empire. It was a two-storey wooden building. This was Anna's preferred summer residence.

It burnt down in 1740, but was rebuilt in 1741. Empress Elizabeth held a grand banquet here after her coronation in 1742.

Catherine II, who found it rather old-fashioned and dilapidated, ordered its demolition in the 1760s and replaced it with the Catherine Palace (Moscow).
