= Svēte Parish =

Parish of Latvia

- parish of Latvia
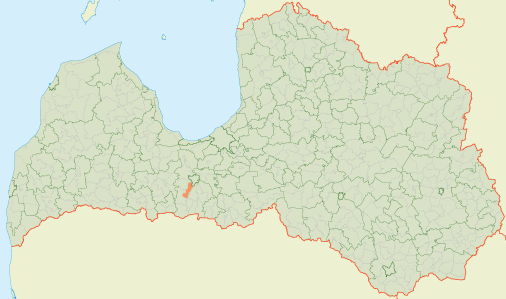
- Coordinates: 56°33′37″N 23°37′28″E
- Country: Latvia

Population (1 January 2026)
  - Total: 1,755
- Time zone: Eastern European Time

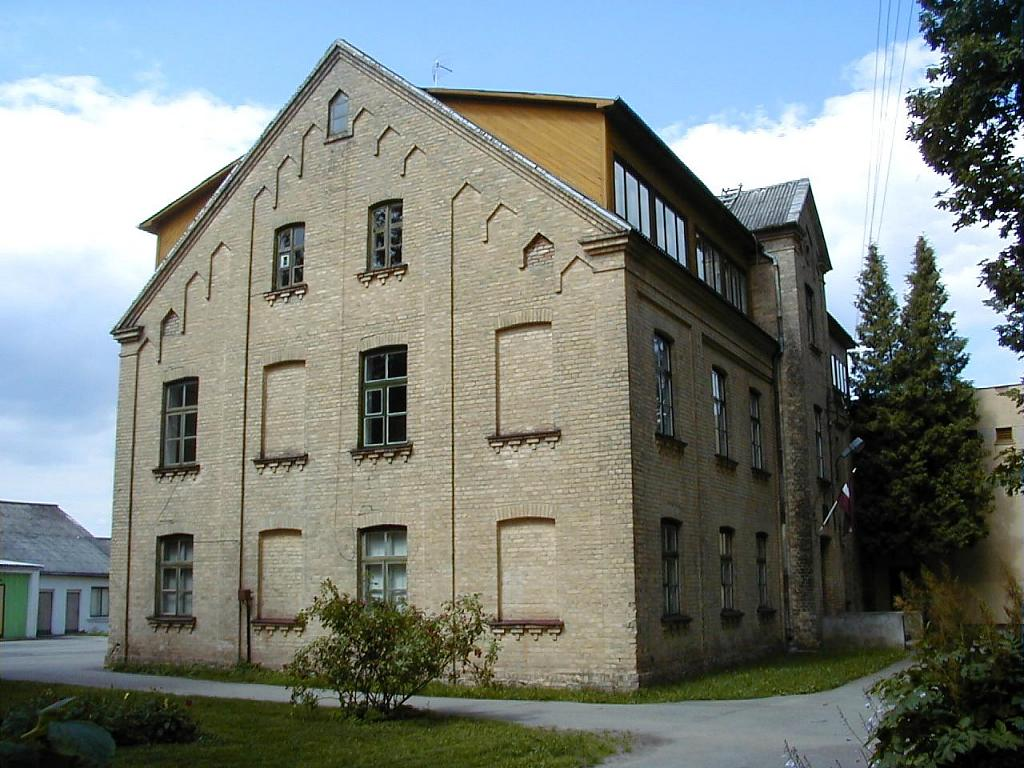
School in Svēte

Svēte parish (Latvian: Svētes pagasts) is an administrative unit of Jelgava Municipality in the Semigallia region of Latvia (Prior to 2009 in the former Jelgava district).

== Towns, villages and settlements of Svēte parish ==
- Svēte, Latvia - parish administrative center
- Jēkabnieki
- Muzikanti
- Atpūta
- Ragumuiža
- Slapatas
- Vētras
