= Rundāle Parish =

Parish of Latvia

- parish of Latvia
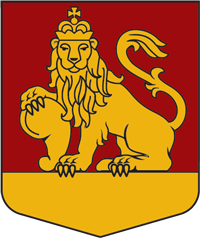
- Coat of arms

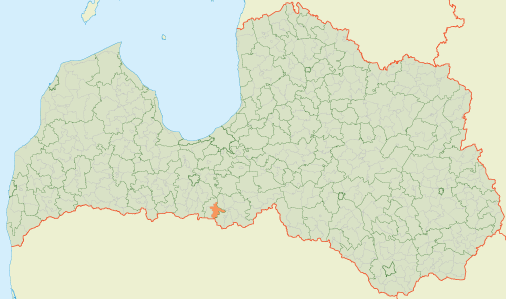
- Coordinates: 56°23′50″N 24°02′12″E
- Country: Latvia

Population (1 January 2026)
  - Total: 1,633

Rundāle Parish (Latvian: Rundāles pagasts) is an administrative unit of Bauska Municipality in the Semigallia region of Latvia.
