= The Lady of the Camellias (ballet) =

- Choreographer: John Neumeier
- Music: Frédéric Chopin
- Based on: La Dame aux Camélias (novel, Alexandre Dumas fils)
- Design: Jürgen Rose
- Setting: Jürgen Rose
- Genre: Narrative ballet

The Lady of the Camellias (French: La Dame aux Camélias) is a ballet in a prologue and three acts, choreographed by John Neumeier on a medley of Chopin's musical pieces. It is adapted from the French novel La Dame aux Camélias written by Alexandre Dumas fils in 1848. It was created on November 4, 1978 with the Stuttgart ballet with Marcia Haydée in the lead role. The ballet was an immediate triumph. It is nowadays danced on the biggest stage all around the world, and part of the repertoire of many international ballet companies such as the Hamburg ballet and the Paris Opera ballet.

== Plot ==
=== Prologue ===
The ballet opens on the auction of the furniture from a luxurious apartment that once belonged to the late Marguerite Gautier. At the center sits her faithful servant, Janine, holding Marguerite’s portrait and bidding her farewell. Around her, the auctioneer, potential buyers, as well as curious visitors and old friends of the deceased wander through the room. Suddenly, a young man, Armand Duval, bursts in and, overwhelmed by sadness, nearly faints. His father, also present, comes to support him. Armand then shares his memories with his father, drawing the audience into his story.

=== Act 1 ===
One night, Armand is at the Théâtre des Variétés, where the ballet Manon Lescaut is being performed — the famous tragedy of the woman torn between her taste for luxury and her love for the chevalier Des Grieux. In the audience sits one of the most beautiful kept women in Paris, Marguerite Gautier, who seems moved by Manon’s story, to which she feels close to but refuses to identify herself to.

Having secretly admired Marguerite for a long time, Armand is finally introduced to her by a friend. Overwhelmed, he watches the rest of the performance with a feeling of unease. He begins to see himself in Des Grieux and fears glimpsing his own tragic destiny.

After the show, hoping to distract herself from the presence of the Count of N., Marguerite invites Gaston, Armand’s friend, and Prudence, a somewhat vulgar kept woman, to her home, and Armand joins them. But Marguerite uses him to provoke the count, who jealous, eventually leaves. Seized by a fit of coughing, she withdraws to her bedroom, and Armand follows to offer his help, and ends up confessing his love. She rejects him, though she is touched by the passion he expresses.

Later, Marguerite continues living her usual life, from one ball to the next, from one admirer to another, from an old duke to a young count. But Armand keeps waiting for her and follows her to the countryside, where the duke sends her to take care of her health.

=== Act 2 ===
In the countryside, Marguerite maintains her extravagant lifestyle, inviting friends and relying on the duke’s money. When the latter comes one day and tries to give her an order, she stands up to him and decides to give up the financial support he provides. After the duke and her friends leave, Marguerite and Armand remain alone and can finally live their love freely, without constraint.

But Mr. Duval, informed of his son’s conduct, secretly pays a visit to Marguerite at the country house and asks her to break up with Armand. Out of love for him, she agrees to sacrifice herself. When Armand returns, the house is already empty, and Janine hands him a note in which Marguerite tells him she is going back to her dissolute life in Paris. Devastated, he runs all the way back to the capital.

The Armand at the auction is still lost in his memories.

=== Act 3 ===
Some time later, Marguerite and Armand randomly run into each other on the Champs‑Élysées. Marguerite is out for a walk with another beautiful kept woman, named Olympe. Deeply hurt by what Marguerite did, Armand seizes the opportunity to take revenge by courting Olympe.

Already condemned by her illness, Marguerite goes to find Armand one last time to plead with him to put an end to his humiliating attitude toward her. They end up spending the night together. But in her dreams, Marguerite is haunted by Manon, and when she wakes up, she leaves him once again to remain true to her promise. Armand finds himself alone once more.

== Dance and structure ==
It is a ballet based on the classical technique. It is one of Neumeier’s first major narrative ballets, in which the gestural excludes any form of traditional pantomime and the storytelling only relies on danced movements. It doesn't follow the traditional structure of the grand ballet classique. It follow the narration of the book, which is shared between the embedded narratives of Armand and of Marguerite through her diary. According to the choreographer, it is “a new form of dramatic ballet which is absolutely not a ballet of the XIXth century, and the structure is absolutely not like the structure of the XIXth century. The story is from the XIXth century, but the structure, in a sense, is very modern” (interview available on YouTube).

The ballet counts three very long and very technical pas de deux, one in each act, as Amandine Albisson who danced Marguerite attests : “The difficulty of La Dame aux Camélias, is that the pas de deux are very technical, very acrobatic and very long. In fact, there are three long pas de deux that last about 10 min each [...]. There are lifts that took us a long time to understand and excuse successfully. It’s the challenge.” (interview available on YouTube)

== Music ==
The music chosen by Neumeier is a medley of Chopin’s musical pieces.

The choreographer explains his choice: “I think the choice of Chopin for me is absolutely ideal, because there’s a parallel [...] Between the two sides of Chopin. Because Chopin was very important in the society of Paris in the 19th century, and there was a certain frivolity and gaiety in the music which represents this side of society. And at the same time, there is in Chopin, in his polish origins and in the fact of his own illness, there is a sadness in the music, there’s a sense of a more shadowy destiny, which I think expresses exactly the main essential themes of this ballet.” (interview available on YouTube).

== Sets and costumes ==
The sets and costumes designed by Jürgen Rose are simple but very accurate to the historical context of the plot.

== Connection with Manon Lescaut ==
The ballet draws up the link with Manon Lescaut and the chevalier Des Grieux, faithfully to the book, who follow the psychological evolution of Marguerite and Armand.
