= Duchess of Courland =

== Duchess of Courland ==
=== House of Kettler, 1561–1737 ===
Picture	Name	Father	Birth	Marriage	Became Duchess	Ceased to be Duchess	Death	Spouse
	Anna of Mecklenburg	Albrecht VII, Duke of Mecklenburg (Mecklenburg)	14 October 1533	3 November 1566		17 May 1587 husband's death	4 July 1602	Gotthard Kettler
	Elisabeth Magdalena of Pomerania	Ernst Ludwig, Duke of Pomerania (Pomerania)	14 June 1580	14 March 1600		17 August 1642 husband's desposition	23 February 1649	Friedrich Kettler
	Sophia of Prussia	Albert Frederick, Duke of Prussia (Hohenzollern)	31 March 1582	22 October 1609		4 December 1610		Wilhelm Kettler
	Louise Charlotte of Brandenburg	George William, Elector of Brandenburg (Hohenzollern)	13 September 1617	9 October 1645		29 August 1676		Jacob Kettler
	Sophie Amalie of Nassau-Siegen	Henry of Nassau-Siegen (Nassau-Siegen)	10 January 1650	25 October 1675	1 January 1682 father-in-law’s death	25 December 1688		Friedrich Casimir Kettler
	Elisabeth Sophie of Brandenburg	Frederick William I, Elector of Brandenburg (Hohenzollern)	5 April 1674	29 April 1691		22 January 1698 husband's death	22 November 1748	Friedrich Casimir Kettler
	Anna Ivanovna of Russia	Ivan V of Russia (Romanov)	7 February 1693	11 November 1710		21 January 1711 husband's death	28 October 1740	Friedrich Wilhelm Kettler
	Johanna Magdalene of Saxe-Weissenfels	Johann Georg, Duke of Saxe-Weissenfels (Wettin)	17 March 1708	20 September 1730		4 May 1737 husband's death	25 January 1760	Ferdinand Kettler

=== House of Biron, 1737–1740 ===
Picture	Name	Father	Birth	Marriage	Became Duchess	Ceased to be Duchess	Death	Spouse
	Benigna Gottliebe von Trotha genannt Treyden	Wilhelm von Trotha Truiden	15 October 1703	25 February 1723	June 1737 husband's election	19 November 1740 husband exiled	5 November 1782	Ernst Johann von Biron

- Council of the Duke, 1740–58

=== House of Wettin, 1758–1763 ===
- None, although Charles of Saxony was morganatically married with the Polish countess Franciszka Korwin-Krasińska.

=== House of Biron, 1763–1795 ===
Picture	Name	Father	Birth	Marriage	Became Duchess	Ceased to be Duchess	Death	Spouse
	Benigna Gottliebe von Trotha genannt Treyden	Wilhelm von Trohta Truiden	15 October 1703	25 February 1723	1763 husband's restoration	1769 husband abdication	5 November 1782	Ernst Johann von Biron
	Caroline of Waldeck and Pyrmont	Karl August, Prince of Waldeck and Pyrmont (Waldeck-Pyrmont)	14 August 1748	15 October 1765	1769 husband's restoration	1772 divorce	18 August 1782	Peter von Biron
	Yevdokiya Borisovna Yusupova	Prince Boris Grigorievich Yusupov (Yusupov)	16 May 1743	6 March 1774		1778 divorce	19 July 1780	Peter von Biron
	Dorothea von Medem	Count Friedrich von Medem (Medem)	3 February 1761	6 November 1779		28 March 1795; Duchy abolished	20 August 1821	Peter von Biron
