= Fredericka Elisabeth of Saxe-Eisenach =

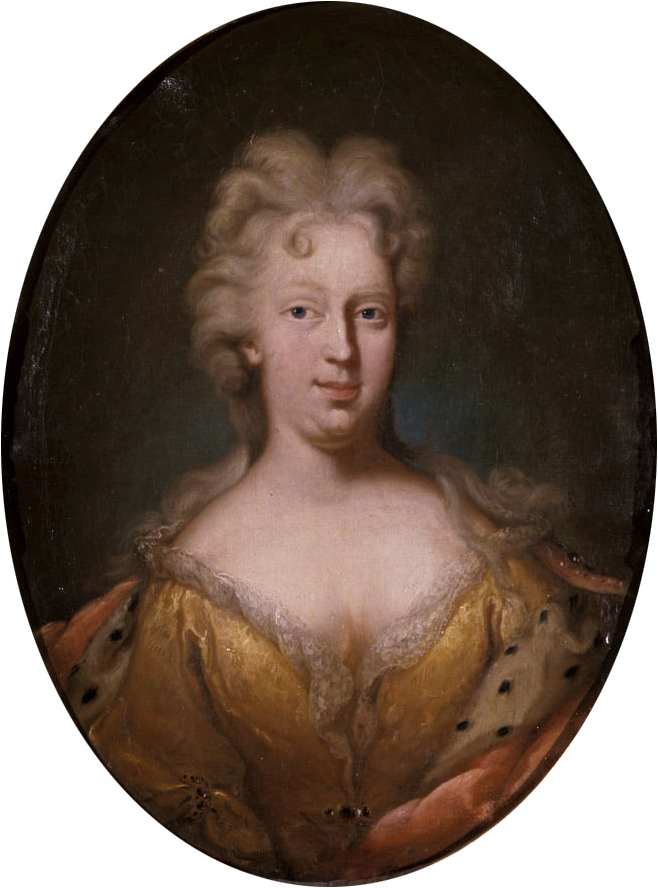

Duchess consort of Saxe-Weissenfels
- Tenure: 1698–1712
- Born: 5 May 1669; Altenkirchen
- Died: 12 November 1730 (aged 61); Langensalza
- Spouse: Johann Georg, Duke of Saxe-Weissenfels
- Issue: Johanna Magdalene, Duchess of Courland and Semigallia
- House: Wettin
- Father: John George I, Duke of Saxe-Eisenach
- Mother: Johannetta of Sayn-Wittgenstein

Fredericka Elisabeth of Saxe-Eisenach (5 May 1669 – 12 November 1730), was a German noblewoman member of the House of Wettin and by marriage Duchess of Saxe-Weissenfels.

Born in Altenkirchen, she was the seventh of eight children born from the marriage of John George I, Duke of Saxe-Eisenach and Johannetta, Countess of Sayn-Wittgenstein-Sayn-Altenkirchen. From her seven older and younger siblings four survive adulthood: Eleonore Erdmuthe Luise (by her two marriages Margravine of Brandenburg-Ansbach and Electress of Saxony), Frederick August, Hereditary Prince of Saxe-Eisenach, John George II, Duke of Saxe-Eisenach and John William, Duke of Saxe-Eisenach.

== Life ==
The already good relations between the Albertine and Ernestine branches of the House of Wettin were reinforced already in 1686 when Duke John George II of Saxe-Eisenach (from the Ernestine branch) arranged the marriage of his older sister, the Dowager Margravine of Brandenburg-Ansbach with John George IV, Elector of Saxony (from the Albertine branch). However, the union was a complete failure and ended childless. Both spouses died in 1694 and 1696, respectively.

With John George IV's brother and successor, Frederick August I already married, Duke John George II had to search another marriage to bond again both Wettin branches.

In this way, ten months before his own death (10 November 1698) Duke John George II arranged the marriage of his younger sister Fredericka Elisabeth with Johann Georg, Duke of Saxe-Weissenfels. The wedding took place in Jena on 7 January 1698. They had seven children, of whom only one survive adulthood:

1. Fredericka (Weissenfels, 4 August 1701 – Weissenfels, 28 February 1706).
2. Johann Georg, Hereditary Prince of Saxe-Weissenfels (Weissenfels, 20 October 1702 – Weissenfels, 5 March 1703).
3. Johannetta Wilhelmine (Weissenfels, 31 May 1704 – Weissenfels, 9 July 1704).
4. Johannetta Amalie (Weissenfels, 8 September 1705 – Weissenfels, 7 February 1706).
5. Stillborn son (1706).
6. Johanna Magdalene (Weissenfels, 17 March 1708 – Leipzig, 25 January 1760), married on 5 January 1730 to Ferdinand Kettler, Duke of Courland and Semigallia.
7. Fredericka Amalie (Weissenfels, 1 March 1712 – Weissenfels, 31 January 1714).

In addition to the reform policies of her husband in the Querfurt-Weissenfels tiny Duchy, Frederica Elisabeth brought considerable social impulse. So they worked towards the adoption of a charity order in 1700 and founded on her birthday in 1710 an orphanage in Langendorf, whom she continued to supported financially until her death.

Particularly attracted to Frederica Elisabeth was the popular jardin à la française. As a gift to her, Duke Johann Georg built the so-called Hermitage between Weissenfels and Langendorf, the Klein-Friedenthal (a summer palace), a zoo at Neuenburg Castle (Freyburg) and the garden at the Leisslinger Wiese.

Her husband was also prone to great courtly splendor, under which he specially made for Fredericka Elisabeth in 1710 the construction of an expensive small river port in Weissenfels. With a small flotilla of 15 ships, were organized pleasure cruises on the Saale.

After her husband's death and the accession of her brother-in-law Christian to the Ducal throne in 1712, she received Dryburg Castle in Langensalza as her Wittum (already designated to her in 1695), where she ordered the construction of a royal park before finally moved there in 1717. In addition to the changes in the park, she made several structural changes in the Castle and nearby town.

Fredericka Elisabeth died in Dryburg Castle aged 61, and was buried in the Schlosskirche, Weissenfels. Since her body had to be firstly embalmed before his long journey to Weissenfels, the extracted entrails were buried separately in an urn.

== Notes ==
Fredericka Elisabeth of Saxe-Eisenach House of Wettin Born: 5 May 1669 Died: 12 November 1730
German royalty
Vacant Title last held by Johanna Magdalena of Saxe-Altenburg	Duchess consort of Saxe-Weissenfels; 1698–1712	Vacant Title next held by Louise Christine of Stolberg-Stolberg-Ortenberg
