= Duchy of Courland and Semigallia =

1561–1795 Polish–Lithuanian vassal state in the Baltics

Coordinates: 56°38′11″N 23°42′55″E

Duchy of Courland and Semigallia Herzogtum Kurland und Semgallen (German) Kurzemes un Zemgales hercogiste (Latvian)
- 1561–1795
- Flag Coat of arms

- Duchy of Courland and Semigallia in 1714: Duchy of Courland and Semigallia; Polish-Lithuanian Commonwealth
- Status: Vassal state of Grand Duchy of Lithuania (1561–1569) and Poland–Lithuania (1569–1795)
- Capital: Mitau
- Common languages: Official: German Other: Latvian; Livonian; Latgalian
- Religion: Lutheran, Roman Catholic
- Demonyms: Courlander, Couronian, Courish, Courlandish
- Government: Monarchy
- Duke
  - 1561–1587: Gotthard Kettler (first)
  - 1769–1795: Peter von Biron (last)
- Legislature: Landtag
- History
  - Treaty of Vilnius: 28 November 1561
  - Colonial acquisitions: 1637–1690
  - Third Partition of Poland: 28 March 1795

Area
  - Total: 27,290 km^{2} (10,540 sq mi)

Population
  - Estimate: ~200,000 (1794)
  - Density: 7.3/km^{2} (18.9/sq mi)
- Currency: Thaler
Preceded by	Succeeded by
Bishopric of Courland; Livonian Order	Courland Governorate
- Today part of: Latvia

The Duchy of Courland and Semigallia (Note: Latin: Ducatus Curlandiæ et Semigalliæ; German: Herzogtum Kurland und Semgallen; Latvian: Kurzemes un Zemgales hercogiste; Lithuanian: Kuršo ir Žiemgalos kunigaikštystė; Polish: Księstwo Kurlandii i Semigalii.) was a duchy in the Baltic region, then known as Livonia, that existed from 1561 to 1569 as a nominal vassal state of the Grand Duchy of Lithuania and subsequently made part of the Crown of the Polish Kingdom from 1569 to 1726 and incorporated into the Polish–Lithuanian Commonwealth in 1726. On 24 October 1795, it was annexed by the Russian Empire in the Third Partition of Poland.

== History ==
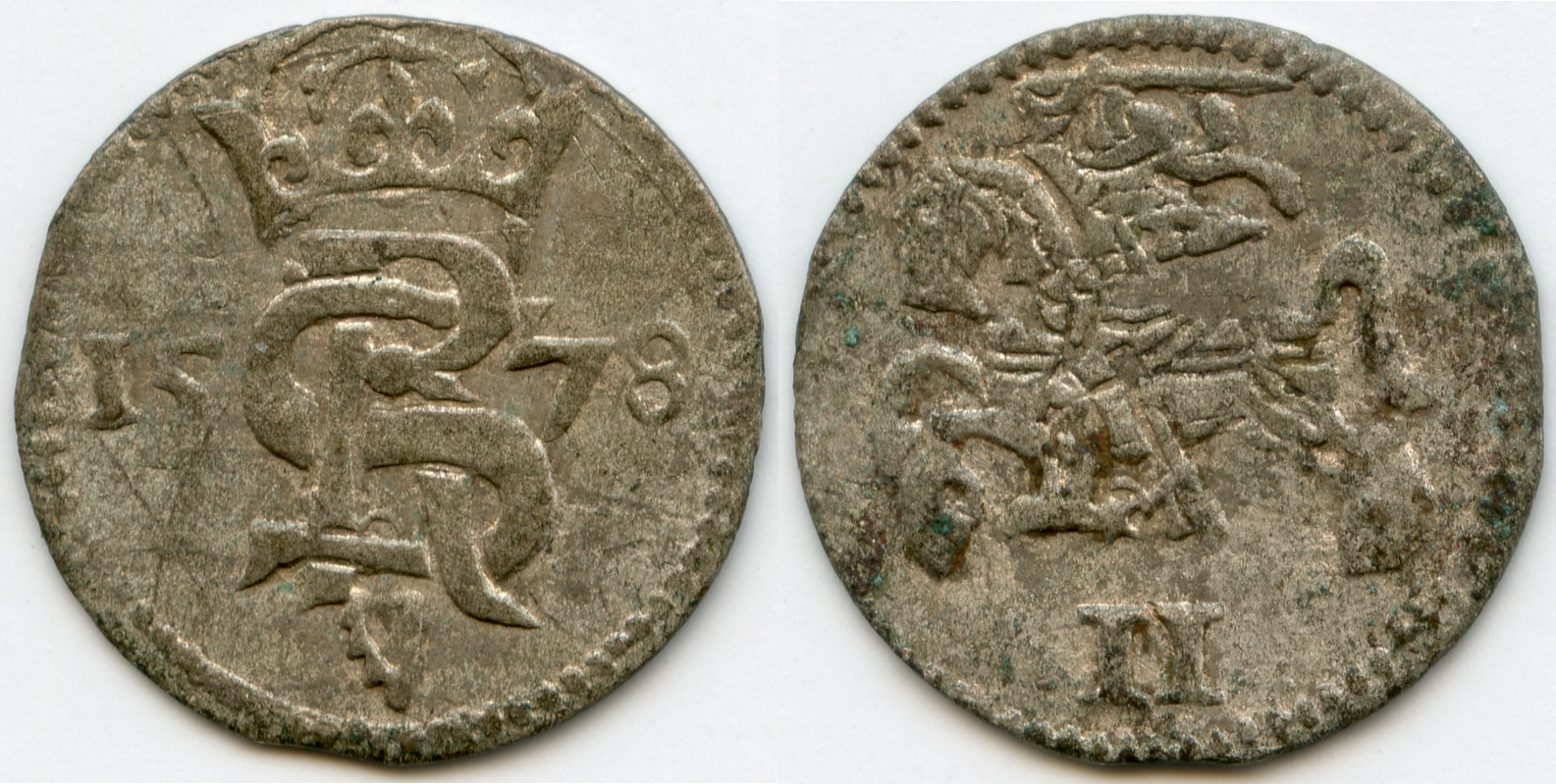
Double-Denar with monogram of Grand Duke Stephen Báthory and the coat of arms of Lithuania, minted in Mitau, 1578

In 1561, during the Livonian Wars, the Livonian Confederation was dismantled and the Livonian Order was disbanded. On the basis of the Treaty of Vilnius, the southern part of Estonia and the northern part of Latvia were ceded to the Grand Duchy of Lithuania. On 25 December 1566, the Union of Grodno established a real union between the Grand Duchy of Lithuania and the Duchy of Livonia. The part of Latvia between the west bank of the Daugava River and the Baltic Sea became the Duchy of Courland and Semigallia. It was ruled by the dukes from the House of Kettler with the exception of Ernst Johann von Biron and his son Peter von Biron.

Gotthard Kettler, the last Master of the Livonian Order, became the first duke of Courland. Other members of the Order became the Couronian nobility, with the fiefdoms they had hitherto held becoming their estates. In all, Kettler received nearly one-third of the land in the new duchy. Mitau (Jelgava) was designated as the new capital, and a Landtag was to meet there twice a year.

Several parts of the Courish area did not belong to the Duchy. The Order of Livonia had already loaned the Grobiņa district (on the coast of the Baltic Sea) to the Duke of Prussia. Another district, the former Bishopric of Courland, belonged to Magnus, son of the king of Denmark. He promised to transfer it to the Duchy of Courland after his death, but this plan failed and only later did Wilhelm Kettler regain this district. Like the other members of the Order, Kettler was German and set about establishing the Duchy along the lines of similar German states. In 1570, he issued the Privilegium Gotthardinum, which allowed the landholders to enserf the native peasantry on their lands.

When Gotthard Kettler died in 1587, his sons, Friedrich and Wilhelm, became the dukes of Courland. They divided the Duchy into two parts in 1596. Friedrich controlled the eastern part, Semigalia (Zemgale), with his residence in Mitau (Jelgava). Wilhelm owned the western part, Courland (Kurzeme), with his residence in Goldingen (Kuldīga). Wilhelm regained the Grobiņa district when he married the daughter of the Duke of Prussia. He also paid out and regained control over the District of Pilten, but eventually, it fell to the Polish–Lithuanian Commonwealth. Here he developed metalworking and shipyards, and the new ships delivered the goods of Courland to other countries.

However, relations between the duke and the landowners were quite hostile. In addition, the Polish–Lithuanian Commonwealth, which was the overlord of the Duchy of Courland, supported the landowners. Wilhelm expressed his disappointment with the landowners, but this ended with his removal from the duke's seat in 1616. Finally, Wilhelm left Courland and spent the rest of his life abroad. Thus, Friedrich became the only duke of Courland after 1616.

From 1600 to 1629, the Polish–Lithuanian Commonwealth and Sweden conducted a war with its main battlefields around Riga. As a result, Sweden gained control of what is today central and northern Latvia, which became Swedish Livonia. The Commonwealth retained the eastern part of the Duchy of Livonia, thereafter called Inflanty Voivodeship in Polish. Courland was also involved in this war, but did not suffer severe damage.

Under the next duke, Jacob Kettler, the Duchy reached the peak of its prosperity. During his travels in Western Europe, Jacob became an eager proponent of mercantilist ideas. Metalworking and shipbuilding became much more developed, and powder mills began producing gunpowder. Trading relations developed not only with nearby countries but also with Britain, France, the Netherlands and Portugal. Jacob established the merchant fleet of the Duchy of Courland, with its main harbours in Ventspils and Libau.

=== Colonisation ===
In 1651, the Duchy established its first colony in Africa, Saint Andrews Island at the Gambia River, and founded Jacob Fort there. The main export goods included ivory, gold, furs and spices. Soon afterwards, in 1652, Courlanders established another colony, in Tobago in the West Indies. The main export goods included sugar, tobacco, coffee and spices.

However, during this time, the Duchy of Courland remained an object of interest for both Sweden and the Polish–Lithuanian Commonwealth. In 1655, the Swedish army entered the territory of the Duchy, starting the Swedish–Polish war (1655–1660). The Swedish army captured Duke Jacob (1658–1660). During this period, the Dutch took over both of Courland's colonies that lacked supplies and manpower, and the merchant fleet and factories suffered destruction. This war ended with the peace Treaty of Oliwa (1660). Courland regained Tobago on the basis of the treaty and held it until 1689. Duke Jacob set about restoring the fleet and factories, but the Duchy of Courland never again reached its pre-war level of prosperity.

=== 18th century ===
The Duchy of Courland and Semigallia in 1740 (in yellow, with the main towns indicated)

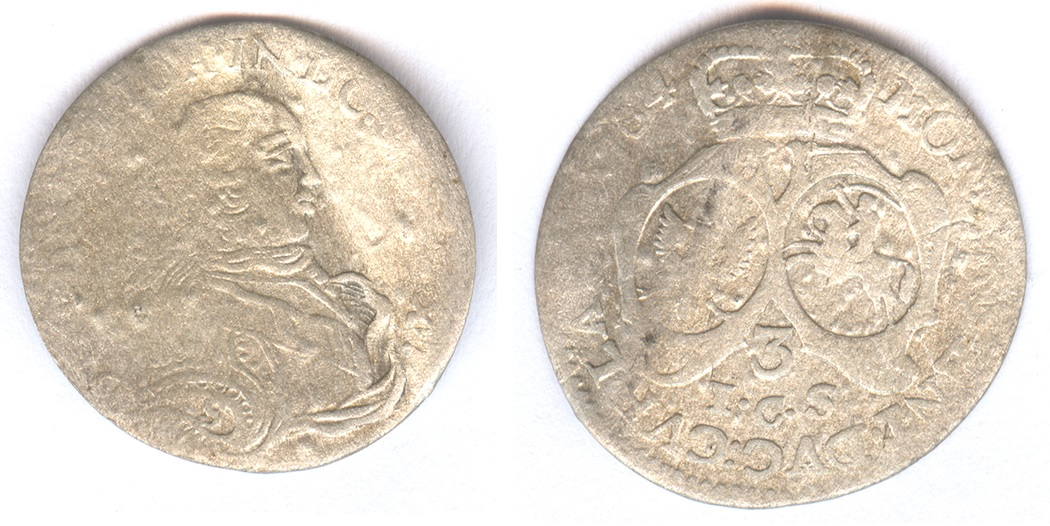
Coin of the Duchy of Courland and Semigallia with portrait of Ernst Johann von Biron, coat of arms of Poland and the coat of arms of Lithuania, 1764

When Jacob died in 1682, his son, Friedrich Casimir Kettler, became the next duke. During his reign, production continued to decrease. The duke himself was more interested in glamorous celebrations and spent more money than he had. This forced him to sell Tobago to the British. During this period, the Commonwealth increased its influence in the political and economic life of the Duchy. Additionally, Russia showed an interest in this area.

Friedrich Casimir died in 1698. His successor, Friedrich Wilhelm Kettler, was only six years old and was under the regency of his uncle Ferdinand – a Polish general. During this time, the Great Northern War (1700–1721) began between Sweden and Russia with its allies – the Commonwealth, Saxony and Denmark. As a result of the war, Russia took control of Swedish Livonia starting in 1710. In Courland, Russia also had such a strong influence that its ambassador, Pyotr Bestuzhev, became the most powerful man in the duchy. The Tsar of Russia, Peter the Great, received a promise from Friedrich Wilhelm that he would marry one of the daughters of the tsar's brother. By having this promise, Peter the Great wished to increase the influence of Russia in Courland. In 1710, Friedrich Wilhelm married Anna Ioannovna (later Empress of Russia), but on his way back from Saint Petersburg, he took ill and died. Anna ruled as the duchess of Courland from 1711 to 1730.

After the death of Friedrich Wilhelm, the next candidate for the seat of duke was Ferdinand Kettler, who, at the time, lived in Danzig. Because the law required the duke to reside within the Duchy, the Diet did not recognise him. Because Ferdinand was the last representative of Kettler's family, a remarkable number of candidates tried to gain the dukedom during this period. One favourite was Maurice de Saxe, natural son of Augustus II the Strong, King of Poland. Saxe had managed to gain support and was even mentioned as a potential husband for Anna Ioannovna, Duchess of Courland at that time.

He was elected duke in 1726, but only managed to maintain himself by force of arms till the next year. Russia disliked him and sent an army to western Courland to destroy Maurice's base. When Catherine I was Empress, Peter Lacy was given responsibility for removing Maurice de Saxe from Courland.

As a result, Maurice de Saxe had to leave Courland, and Russia increased its influence. This was achieved in good measure due to the service of Peter Lacy, who was governor of Livonia from 1727 until his death in 1751. Russian influence increased further when Frederick Augustus III, Elector of Saxony, in his successful bid to succeed his father on the Polish throne in the 1730s, agreed to grant Anna of Russia her choice of successor to the Courish duchy in exchange for Russian support in the War of the Polish Succession. (Because of the duchy's position as a vassal of the Commonwealth and Ferdinand Kettler's lack of issue, the duchy would otherwise formally have devolved onto the Polish throne.) Anna appointed Ernst Johann von Biron duke of Courland in 1737.

Von Biron received remarkable financial support from Russia and invested it in construction – for example, the Castle of Ruhenthal projected by the distinguished Italian architect Bartolomeo Rastrelli. Anna of Russia died in 1740, resulting in von Biron's exile to Siberia the following year. From there, through the Council of the Duke, he continued to control the Duchy, with the agreement of the king of Poland. However, the landowners of Courland disliked the agreement and even refused to follow the regulations of the Council of the Duke.

Duke Louis Ernest of Brunswick-Lüneburg was selected as Biron's successor on 27 June 1741, with the support of his cousin Maria Theresa of Austria, but while he was in Saint Petersburg to get this title ratified, Elizabeth of Russia carried out a coup on 6 December 1741, and he lost the title.

King Augustus III of Poland proclaimed his son, Carl Christian Joseph of Saxony, the next duke. Thus, the Duchy of Courland had two dukes simultaneously thereafter. The situation became extremely tense – one part of the Landtag of Courland accepted von Biron, the other, Carl of Saxony. The Empress Catherine II of Russia (reigned 1762–1796) solved this situation by recalling Ernst von Biron from exile in 1763. By doing this, she avoided the possible increase of influence of the Commonwealth in Courland. However, political fighting had exhausted Ernst von Biron, and he turned the seat of the duke over to his son, Peter von Biron, in 1769. But political tumult continued in Courland. Some landowners supported the Commonwealth, some Russia. Ultimately, Russia determined the further fate of Courland when, with its allies, it began the Third Partition of Poland (1795). Given a "nice recommendation" by Russia, Duke Peter von Biron gave up his rights to Russia in 1795. With the signing of the final document on 24 October 1795, the Duchy of Courland was incorporated into the Russian Empire and the title of Duke of Courland was added to the title of Russian emperors.

== List of dukes ==
Portrait	Name	Lifespan	Reign	Consorts	Succession
	Gotthard Kettler	2 February 1517 – 17 May 1587	28 November 1561 – 17 May 1587	Anna of Mecklenburg; 11 March 1566; Königsberg; 3 children	First
	Friedrich Kettler	25 November 1569 – 17 August 1642	17 May 1587 – 17 August 1642	Elisabeth Magdalena of Pomerania; 14 March 1600 no issue	Son of Gotthard Kettler
	Jacob Kettler	28 October 1610 – 1 January 1682	17 August 1642 – 1 January 1682	Princess Louise Charlotte of Brandenburg; 9 October 1645; 9 children	Nephew of Friedrich Kettler
	Frederick Casimir Kettler	6 July 1650 – 22 January 1698	1 January 1682 – 22 January 1698	(1) Sophie Amalie of Nassau-Siegen; 5 October 1675; The Hague; 5 children (2) Elisabeth Sophie of Brandenburg; April 29, 1691; 2 children	Son of Jacob Kettler
	Frederick William, Duke of Courland	19 July 1692 – 21 January 1711	22 January 1698 – 21 January 1711	Anna of Russia; 11 November 1710; Saint Petersburg no issue	Son of Frederick Casimir Kettler
	Ferdinand Kettler	1 November 1655 – 4 May 1737	21 January 1711 – 4 May 1737	Johanna Magdalene of Saxe-Weissenfels; 20 September 1730; Danzig no issue	Uncle of Frederick William Kettler
	Ernst Johann von Biron	23 November 1690 – 29 December 1772	June 1737 – 1740	Benigna Gottliebe Biron; 1723; 3 children	Elected
	Duke Louis Ernest of Brunswick-Lüneburg	25 September 1718 – 12 May 1788	27 June 1741 – 6 December 1741	Never married	Elected
	Charles, Duke of Courland	13 July 1733 – 16 June 1796	10 November 1758 – 1763	Franciszka Krasińska; 25 March 1760; Warsaw; 2 daughters	Appointed by Augustus III, King of Poland
	Ernst Johann von Biron	23 November 1690 – 29 December 1772	1763–1769	Benigna Gottliebe Biron; 1723; 3 children	Reappointed by Catherine the Great
	Peter von Biron	15 February 1724 – 13 January 1800	1769 – 28 March 1795	(1) Princess Caroline of Waldeck and Pyrmont; 5 October 1765; 1 son (stillborn) (2) Yevdokiya Yusupova; 6 March 1774; Jelgava no issue (3) Dorothea von Medem; 6 November 1779; 6 children	Son of Ernst Johann von Biron

== Gallery ==
Greater coat of arms of the Dukes of Courland of the Kettler family

Naval Flag of Courland and Semigallia

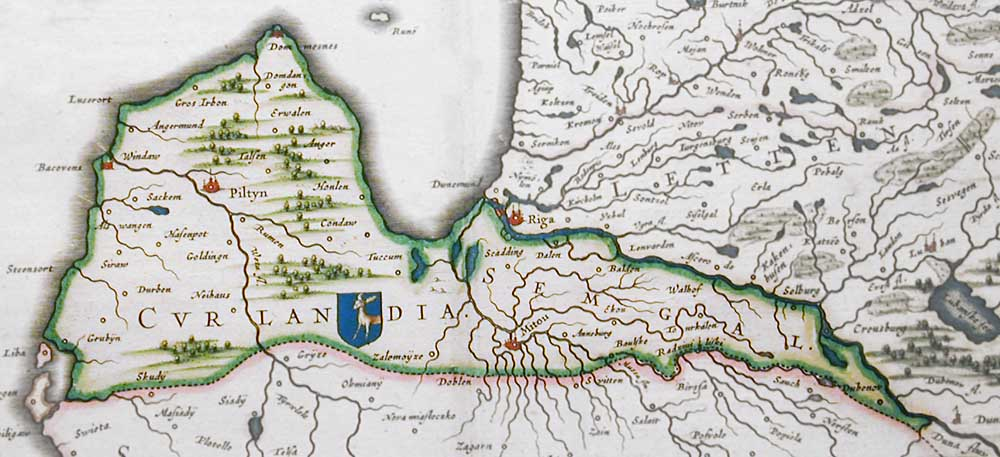
German map of the Duchy of Courland and Semigallia (about 1600)

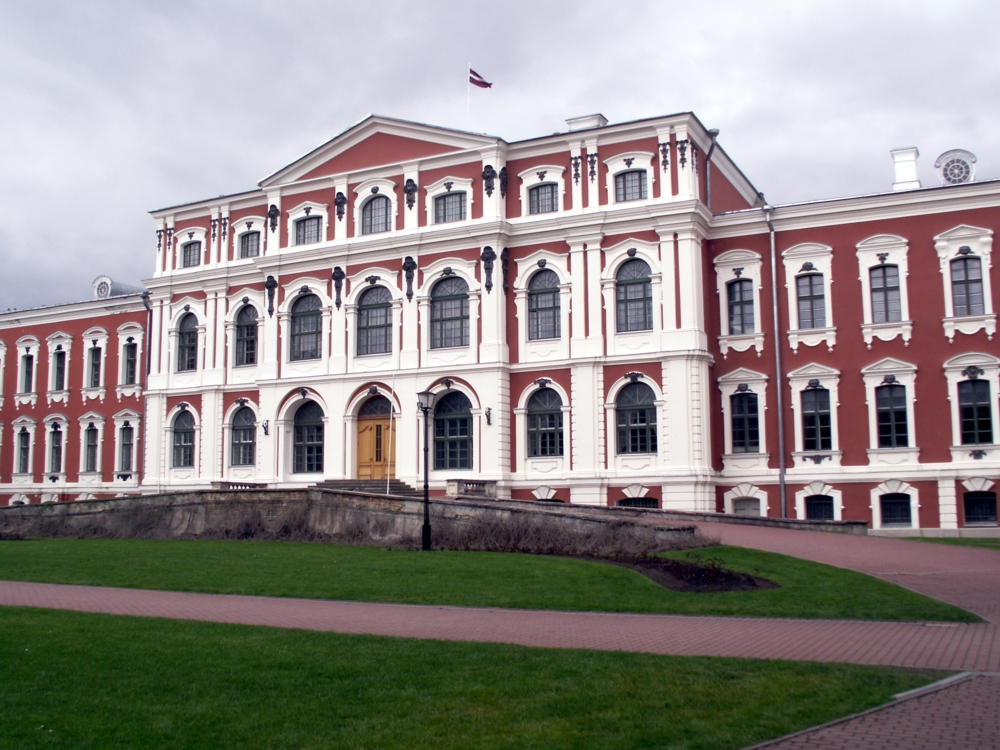
Jelgava Palace, the main residence of the dukes

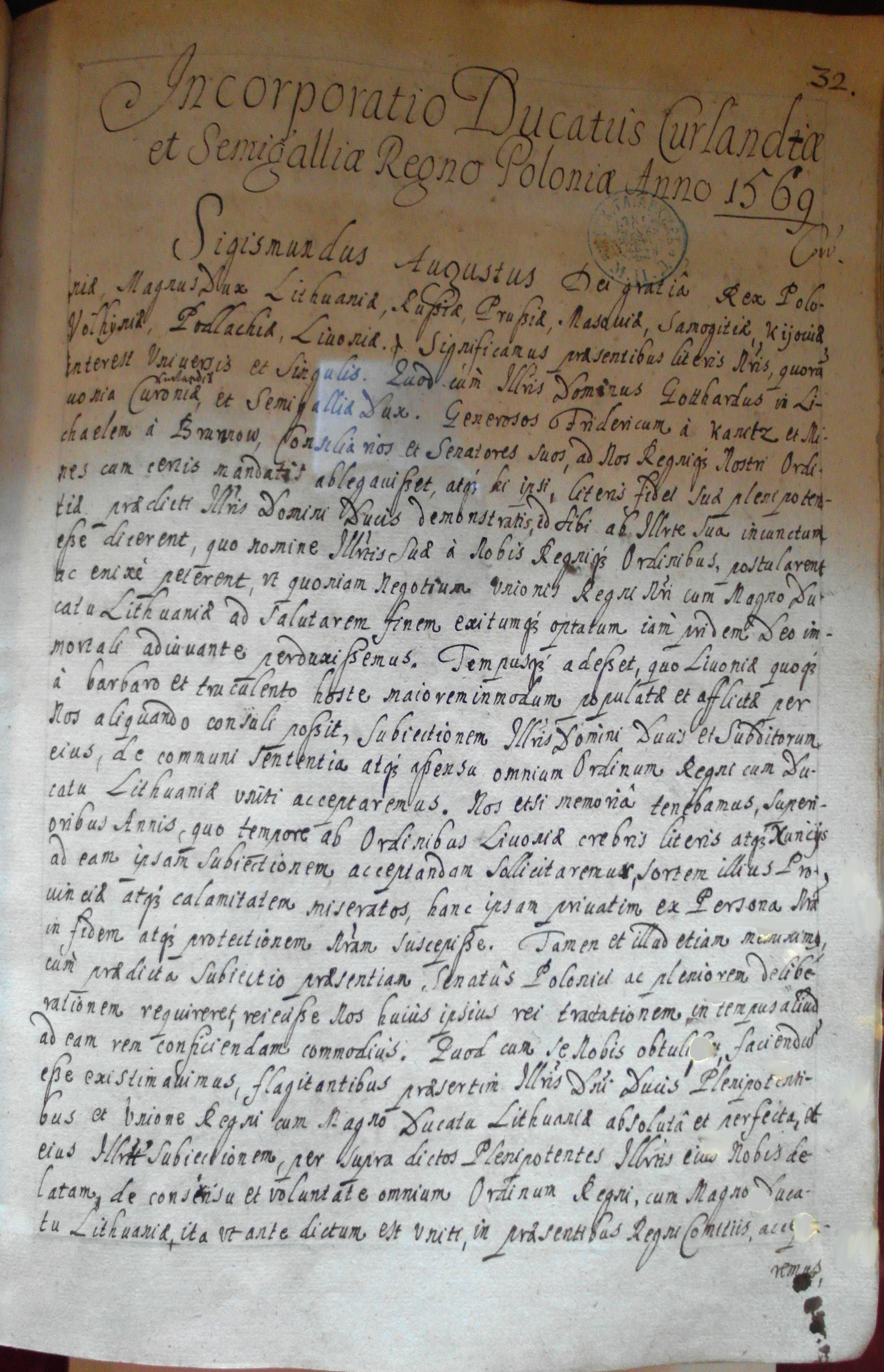
Sigismund Augustus King of Poland and Grand Duke of Lithuania incorporates fiefdoms, Duchies of Courland and Semigalia into the Crown in 1569.

== See also ==
- Coat of arms of Courland
- Duchess of Courland
- Courland
- Couronian colonisation
- Couronian colonisation of the Americas
- Ernst Friedrich von Ockel
- Livonia
- Semigallia

== Bibliography ==
- Ceaser, Ray A., Duchy of Courland, University of Washington, June 2001.
- Plakans, Andrejs (1995), The Latvians: A Short History, Hoover Institution.
