= Amalie Louise of Courland =

German duchess (1687–1750)

- Fürstin of Nassau-Siegen
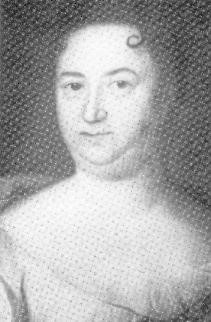
- Fürstin Amalie Louise of Nassau-Siegen, nee Duchess of Courland. Detail of an anonymous portrait, 18th century. Siegerlandmuseum, Siegen.

Fürstin-Regent of Nassau-Siegen
- Coat of arms
- Reign: 1722–1727
- Full name: Amalie Louise Duchess of Courland
- Native name: Amalia Luise Herzogin von Kurland
- Born: Amalia Luise Herzogin in Livland, zu Kurland und Semgallen, Fürstin zu Pilten; 23 July 1687; Mitau
- Died: 18 January 1750 (aged 62); Untere Schloss, Siegen
- Buried: 23 March 1750; Fürstengruft, Siegen
- Noble family: House of Kettler
- Spouse: Frederick William Adolf
- Issue Detail: Wilhelmine Charlotte Louise; Augusta Amelie; Caroline Amelie Adolphina; Elizabeth Hedwig
- Father: Frederick Casimir of Courland
- Mother: Sophie Amalie of Nassau-Siegen

Duchess Amalie Louise of Courland (23 July 1687 – 18 January 1750), German: Amalia Luise Herzogin von Kurland, official titles: Herzogin in Livland, zu Kurland und Semgallen, Fürstin zu Pilten, was a duchess from the House of Kettler and through marriage Fürstin of Nassau-Siegen. She was regent of the Principality of Nassau-Siegen (part of the County of Nassau) for her stepson Frederick William II in the period 1722–1727.

== Biography ==
Amalie Louise was born in Mitau on 23 July 1687 (Note: "Although Dek (1970) and Europäische Stammtafeln I, 117 and II, 88 say that she was born on 27‑7‑1687, we could establish that the birth took place in Mitau on the 23rd. Indeed, the notification that the Duke of Courland sent from Mitau on 24‑7‑1687 announces the birth of a daughter «gestern morgens» (see State Archives Wiesbaden 170^{III}).") as the third daughter of Duke Frederick Casimir of Courland and his first wife Princess Sophie Amalie of Nassau-Siegen.

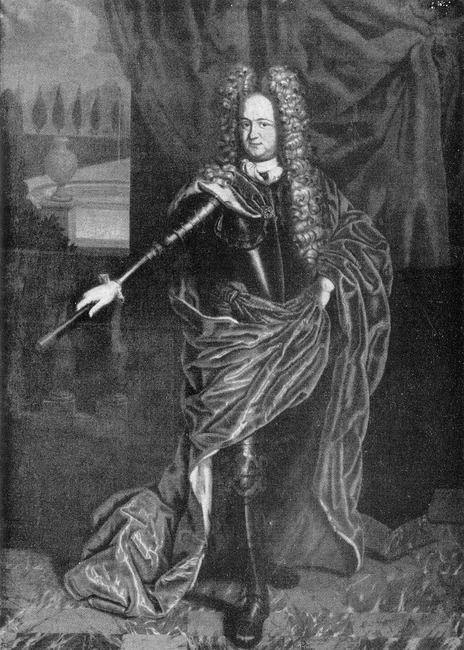
Fürst Frederick William Adolf of Nassau-Siegen, the husband of Amalie Louise. Anonymous portrait, first quarter 18th century. Siegerlandmuseum, Siegen.

Amalie Louise married at the Old Castle in Bayreuth on 13 April 1708 (Note: "Although Dek (1962) and Dek (1970) place the marriage in Bayreuth on 20‑4‑1708 (date confirmed by Europäische Stammtafeln I, 117, Europäische Stammtafeln II, 88 and Knetsch (1931)), we find in the marriage contract that was signed in Siegen on 6‑8‑1708: «solches durch das Fürstliche Beylager mit öffentlichen und gewöhnlichen Christfürstlichen Ceremonien den 13. April des noch laufenden 1708 Jahres in der Fürstlichen Residenz zu Bayreuth vollzogen». The date 13 April is confirmed by the notification of the marriage (see State Archives Marburg 4f, Nassau-Siegen N. 241), dated Bayreuth 18‑4‑1708: «den 13. Aprilis allhier zu Bayreuth … durch würklich gehaltenes Beylager». See also in the Royal House Archive of the Netherlands (IV/1561), personalia: «den 13. April 1708 dero christfürstl. Beylager in Bayreuth». The registers of the Hofkirche in Bayreuth have disappeared.") to her first cousin Fürst Frederick William Adolf of Nassau-Siegen (Note: "In almost all official documents he is mentioned with these three given names, but sometimes only Frederick William (see for instance Menk (1971), p. 89). Dek (1970) names him Frederik Willem I Adolf; Europäische Stammtafeln on the other hand, mentions him as Adolf in its table Nassau-Siegen (band I, 117), while in other places he mentions him under the double given name Friedrich Wilhelm, which causes some confusion among readers.") (Nassauischer Hof, Siegen, 20 February 1680 – Nassauischer Hof, Siegen, 13 February 1722), the eldest son of Fürst William Maurice of Nassau-Siegen and Princess Ernestine Charlotte of Nassau-Schaumburg. Frederick William Adolf was the widower of Landgravine Elisabeth Juliana Francisca of Hesse-Homburg. Amalie Louise was not only a first cousin of her husband Frederick William Adolf, but also of his first wife Elisabeth Juliana Francisca.

On the death of his father in 1691, Frederick William Adolf succeeded his father as the territorial lord of the Protestant part of the principality of Nassau-Siegen and co-ruler of the city of Siegen. He possessed the district of Siegen (with the exception of seven villages) and the districts of Hilchenbach and Freudenberg. He shared the city of Siegen with the Catholic Fürst of Nassau-Siegen. Frederick William Adolf also succeeded his father as count of Bronkhorst, lord of Wisch, Borculo, Lichtenvoorde and Wildenborch, and hereditary knight banneret of the Duchy of Guelders and the County of Zutphen. Following the death of Frederick William Adolf in 1722 he was succeeded by Frederick William II, the only son from the first marriage. But because the latter was still a minor, he was under the custody and regency of his stepmother Amalie Louise until 1727.

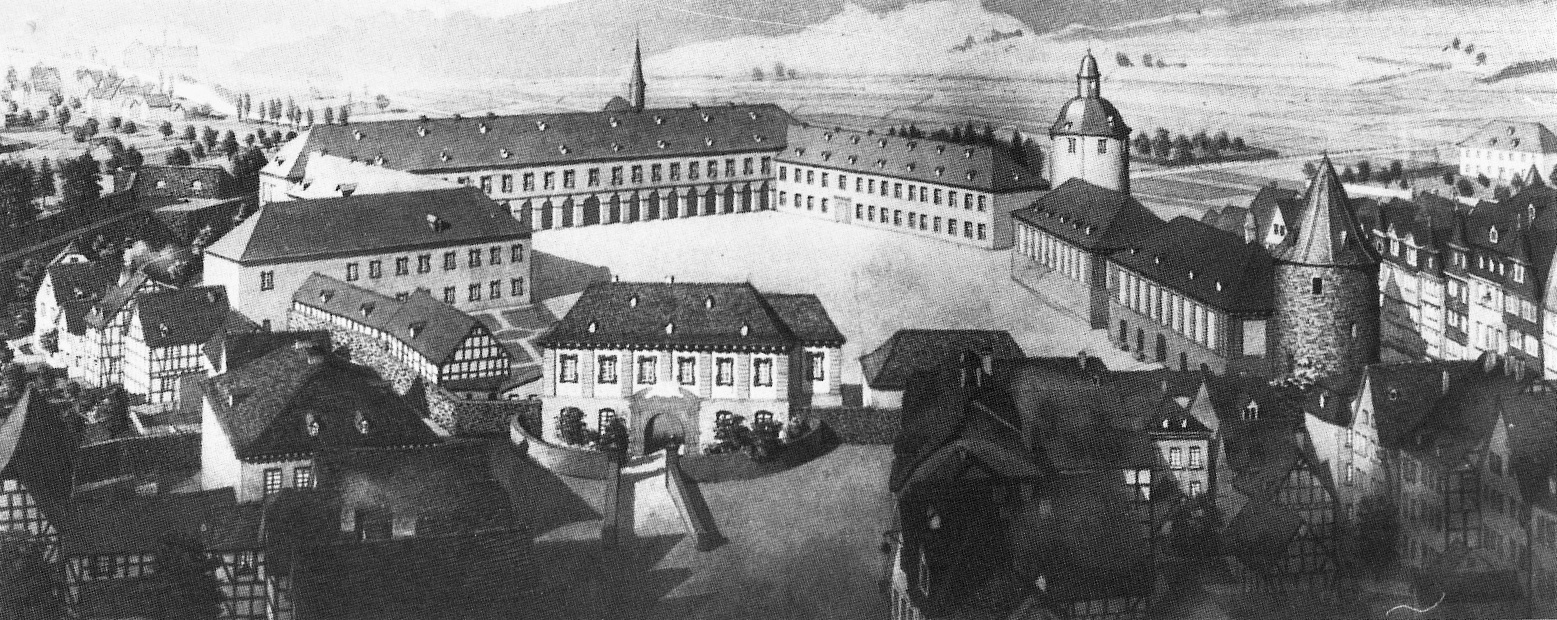
The new Nassauischer Hof, later called Untere Schloss, seen from the west, ca. 1720. Attempt at reconstruction, ink drawing, Wilhelm Scheiner, 1922.

After her regency, Amalie Louise continued to live in the Nassauischer Hof, which has been called Untere Schloss since the mid-18th century. The northern wing of the palace is still called the Kurländer Flügel after her.

Amalie Louise' stepson Frederick William II died in the Nassauischer Hof in Siegen on 2 March 1734, he was only 27 years old. On 19 June, his widow Sophie Polyxena Concordia of Sayn-Wittgenstein-Hohenstein gave birth to the fifth daughter. Thus, there were no male heirs and the Dowager Fürstin was compelled to accept that the Catholic Fürst William Hyacinth would take possession of the Reformed lands and the city of Siegen. However, the Fürsten Christian of Nassau-Dillenburg and William Charles Henry Friso of Nassau-Diez also laid claim to the inheritance. Their soldiers occupied the Nassauischer Hof in Siegen, while William Hyacinth was in Spain. In order to drive out this occupation by Nassau-Dillenburg and Nassau-Diez, Elector Clemens August of Cologne called in the Landesausschuß in his countries bordering the Siegerland. On 20 August 1735, peasants from Cologne crossed the borders of the Principality of Nassau-Siegen and plundered "was ihnen vorkam" ("what was in front of them"). On 23 August they were admitted to the (Catholic) castle and advanced with two to three thousand men to the (Reformed) Nassauischer Hof. But the armies of Nassau-Dillenburg and Nassau-Diez, united with the citizens of Siegen, forced the troops from Cologne to flee. Thus, the Reformed part of Siegerland remained under the rule of Nassau-Dillenburg and Nassau-Diez, and the Catholic part remained under the imperial administration.

During the visits to his German lands in 1741 and 1742, Prince William IV of Orange-Nassau stayed with Amalie Louise and her daughter-in-law Sophie Polyxena Concordia in the Nassauischer Hof in Siegen.

Amalie Louise died at the Untere Schloss in Siegen on 18 January 1750. She was buried on 23 March 1750 in the Fürstengruft there.

== Issue ==
From the marriage of Amalie Louise and Frederick William Adolf the following children were born:

1. Sophia Wilhelmine Adolphina (Nassauischer Hof, Siegen, 28 February 1709 (Note: "According to the parish registers of Siegen, she was born on 1‑3, but the draft notification (State Archives Wiesbaden 170^{III}) shows that she was born on 28‑2: «gestrigen Donnerstag Nachts zwischen eilff und 12 Uhren».") – Nassauischer Hof, Siegen, 16 December 1710 (Note: "The death occurred on 17‑12‑1710 in Europäische Stammtafeln and on 16‑(burial on 17)12‑1710 in Dek (1970). The parish registers of Siegen give 16th as the date of death. See also Royal House Archive of the Netherlands (IV/1561 I‑II), two letters of condolence from which it can be deduced that the death took place in Siegen and in which the date of the 16th is confirmed: a) letter of condolence in response to a notification from Siegen dated 17‑12‑1710, b) letter of condolence in response to a notification in which the death was announced «am 16ten letztverwichenen Monaths Morgendts ein Viertel nach acht Uhren».")).
2. Charles Frederick (Nassauischer Hof, Siegen, 4 March 1710 (Note: "Europäische Stammtafeln wrongly states that he was born on 4‑2‑1710, Dek (1970) writes «Siegen 4‑3‑1710», confirmed by the parish registers of Siegen and the notification of birth kept in the State Archives Marburg (4f Nassau-Siegen, Nr. 241 (7)), dated Siegen 4‑3‑1710: «diesen Morgen um acht Uhr».") – Nassauischer Hof, Siegen, 25 December 1710 (Note: "Definitely deceased in Siegen from where a notification was sent on 25‑12‑1710: «heute früh um halb 6 Uhr» (see State Archives Marburg (4f Nassau-Siegen, Nr. 241).")).
3. Wilhelmine Charlotte Louise (Note: Huberty, et al. (1981), p. 355 names her Charlotte Wilhelmine. The given name Wilhelmina Charlotta Luisa in Menk (2004), p. 201; Wilhelmina Charlotte Louise in Dek (1970), p. 97; Wilhelmine Charlotte Luise in Lück & Wunderlich (1956), p. 35 and Wilhelmina Charlotta Louisa in Vorsterman van Oyen (1882), p. 129.) (Nassauischer Hof, Siegen, 25 April 1711 – Untere Schloss, Siegen, 7 March 1771 (Note: "See Gazette de France 1771, p. 101, dépêche from Vienna 13‑3‑1771: «On mande de Siegen que Charlotte Guillemine de Nass… y est morte le 7 de ce mois». The State Archives Wolfenbüttel preserves (2 Alt 264) a notification dated Wittgenstein 9‑3‑1771, which announces the death «am 7. dieses».")).
4. Augusta Amelie (Note: Given name according to Huberty, et al. (1981), p. 355. The given name Augusta Amelia Albertina Henriëtte Elisabeth in Dek (1970), p. 97 and Augusta Amalia Albertina Henrietta Elisabeth in Vorsterman van Oyen (1882), p. 129.) (Siegen, 9 September 1712 – Wittgenstein Castle, Laasphe, 22 February 1742), married in Siegen on 6 May 1738 to Count Frederick of Sayn-Wittgenstein-Hohenstein (Note: Names according to Huberty, et al. (1981), p. 355. The names Karel Frederik Willem van Sayn-Wittgenstein in Dek (1970), p. 97 and Carel Frederik Willem van Sayn-Wittgenstein-Hohenstein in Vorsterman van Oyen (1882), p. 129.) (Berlin, 29 January 1708 – 9 June 1756). He later remarried the youngest sister of Augusta Amelie.
5. Louis Ferdinand (Nassauischer Hof, Siegen, 29 March 1714 – Nassauischer Hof, Siegen, 26 February 1715).
6. Caroline Amelie Adolphina (Note: "The baptismal certificate names her Charlotte Amélie Adolphine. In the notification of death «Charlotte» is changed into «Caroline».") (Siegen, 26 November 1715 – Laubach, 10 August 1752), married at Wittgenstein Castle in Laasphe on 11 February 1751 to Count Christian August of Solms-Laubach (Wetzlar, 1 August 1714 – Laubach, 20 February 1784).
7. William Maurice (Nassauischer Hof, Siegen, 1 March 1717 – Nassauischer Hof, Siegen, 5 August 1719).
8. Elizabeth Hedwig (Siegen, 19 April 1719 – Wittgenstein Castle, Laasphe, 10 January 1789), married in Siegen on 12 June 1743 to Count Frederick of Sayn-Wittgenstein-Hohenstein (Berlin, 29 January 1708 – 9 June 1756). He was the widower of an older sister of Elisabeth Hedwig.
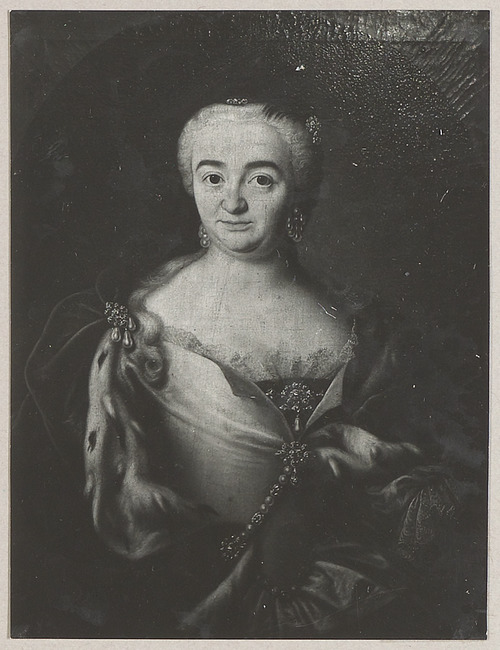
Princess Augusta Amelie of Nassau-Siegen (1712–1742). Portrait by Johann Philipp Behr, 1738. Siegerlandmuseum, Siegen.

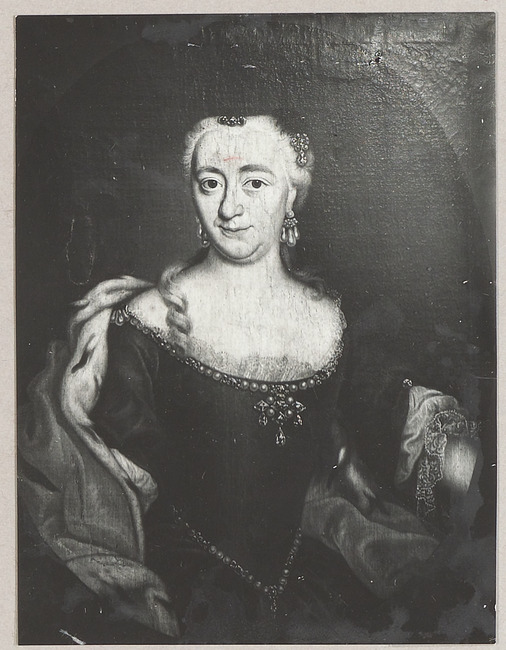
Princess Caroline Amelie Adolphina of Nassau-Siegen (1715–1752). Portrait by Johann Philipp Behr, 1738. Siegerlandmuseum, Siegen.

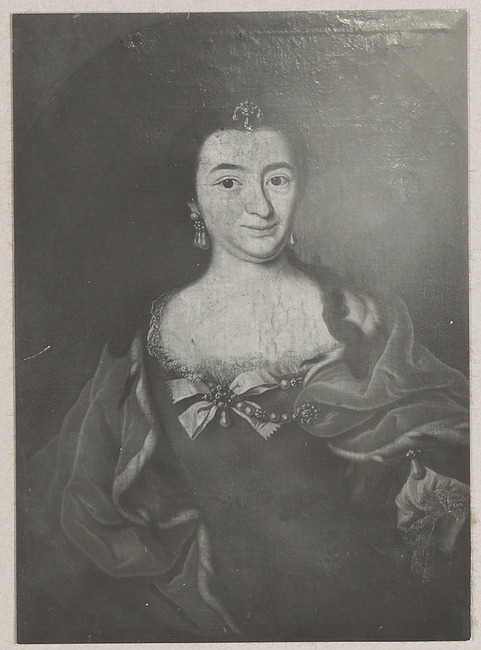
Princess Elizabeth Hedwig of Nassau-Siegen (1719–1789). Portrait by Johann Philipp Behr, 1738. Siegerlandmuseum, Siegen.

== Ancestors ==
Ancestors of Amalie Louise of Courland
Great-great-grandparents	Gotthard of Courland (ca. 1517–1587) ⚭ 1566; Anne of Mecklenburg-Güstrow (1533–1602)	Albert Frederick of Prussia (1553–1618) ⚭ 1573; Marie Eleonore of Jülich (1550–1608)	John Sigismund of Brandenburg (1572–1620) ⚭ 1594; Anne of Prussia (1576–1625)	Frederick IV of the Palatinate (1574–1610) ⚭ 1593; Louise Juliana of Nassau (1576–1644)	John VI 'the Elder' of Nassau-Siegen (1536–1606) ⚭ 1559; Elisabeth of Leuchtenberg (1537–1579)	John 'the Younger' of Schleswig-Holstein-Sonderburg (1545–1622) ⚭ 1568; Elisabeth of Brunswick-Grubenhagen (1550–1586)	Jobst of Limburg-Stirum (1560–1621) ⚭ 1591; Mary of Holstein-Schauenburg-Pinneberg (1559–1616)	Arnold IV of Bentheim-Tecklenburg (1554–1606) ⚭ 1573; Magdalena of Neuenahr-Alpen (1553–1627)
Great-grandparents	William of Courland (1574–1640) ⚭ 1609; Sophie of Prussia (1582–1610)		George William of Brandenburg (1595–1640) ⚭ 1616; Elisabeth Charlotte of the Palatinate (1597–1660)		John VII 'the Middle' of Nassau-Siegen (1561–1623) ⚭ 1603; Margaret of Schleswig-Holstein-Sonderburg (1583–1658)		George Ernest of Limburg-Stirum (1593–1661) ⚭ 1603; Magdalene of Bentheim-Tecklenburg (1591–1649)	
Grandparents	Jacob of Courland (1610–1682) ⚭ 1645; Louise Charlotte of Brandenburg (1617–1676)				Henry of Nassau-Siegen (1611–1652) ⚭ 1646; Mary Magdalene of Limburg-Stirum (1632–1707)			
Parents	Frederick Casimir of Courland (1650–1698) ⚭ 1675; Sophie Amalie of Nassau-Siegen (1650–1688)							

== Sources ==
- Aßmann, Helmut & Menk, Friedhelm (1996). Auf den Spuren von Nassau und Oranien in Siegen (in German). Siegen: Gesellschaft für Stadtmarketing Siegen e.V.
- Behr, Kamill (1854). Genealogie der in Europa regierenden Fürstenhäuser (in German). Leipzig: Verlag von Bernhard Tauchnitz.
- De Clercq, Carlo (1962). "Die katholischen Fürsten von Nassau-Siegen". Nassauische Annalen (in German). Vol. Band 73. Wiesbaden. pp. 129–152.
- Dek, A.W.E. (1962). Graf Johann der Mittlere von Nassau-Siegen und seine 25 Kinder (in German). Rijswijk: Krips Repro.
- Dek, A.W.E. (1968). "De afstammelingen van Juliana van Stolberg tot aan het jaar van de Vrede van Münster". Spiegel der Historie. Maandblad voor de geschiedenis der Nederlanden (in Dutch). 1968 (7/8): 228–303.
- Dek, A.W.E. (1970). Genealogie van het Vorstenhuis Nassau (in Dutch). Zaltbommel: Europese Bibliotheek.
- von Ehrenkrook, Hans Friedrich; Förster, Karl & Marchtaler, Kurt Erhard (1928). Ahnenreihen aus allen deutschen Gauen. Beilage zum Archiv für Sippenforschung und allen verwandten Gebieten (in German). Görlitz: Verlag für Sippenforschung und Wappenkunde C.A. Starke.
- Huberty, Michel; Giraud, Alain & Magdelaine, F. & B. (1981). l'Allemagne Dynastique (in French). Vol. Tome III: Brunswick-Nassau-Schwarzbourg. Le Perreux: Alain Giraud.
- Huberty, Michel; Giraud, Alain & Magdelaine, F. & B. (1987). l'Allemagne Dynastique (in French). Vol. Tome V: Hohenzollern-Waldeck-Familles alliées A-B. Le Perreux-sur-Marne: Alain Giraud.
- Huberty, Michel; Giraud, Alain & Magdelaine, F. & B. (1994). l'Allemagne Dynastique (in French). Vol. Tome VII: Oldenbourg-Familles alliées H-L. Le Perreux-sur-Marne: Alain Giraud.
- Knetsch, Carl (1931). Das Haus Brabant. Genealogie der Herzoge von Brabant und der Landgrafen von Hessen (in German). Vol. II. Teil: Die Nachkommen Philipps des Grossmütigen. Darmstadt: Historischer Verein für das Großherzogtum Hessen.
- Lück, Alfred (1981) [1967]. Siegerland und Nederland (in German) (2nd ed.). Siegen: Siegerländer Heimatverein e.V.
- Lück, Alfred & Wunderlich, Hermann (1956) [1952]. Die Fürstengruft zu Siegen (in German). Siegen: Verkehrsverein Siegen e.V.
- Menk, Friedhelm (1971). Quellen zur Geschichte des Siegerlandes im niederländischen königlichen Hausarchiv (in German). Siegen: Stadt Siegen/Forschungsstelle Siegerland.
- Menk, Friedhelm (2004). "Die Fürstengruft zu Siegen und die darin von 1669 bis 1781 erfolgten Beisetzungen". In Burwitz, Ludwig; Menk, Friedhelm; Opfermann, Ulrich Friedrich; Pfau, Dieter & Plaum, Bernd D. (eds.). Siegener Beiträge. Jahrbuch für regionale Geschichte (in German). Vol. 9. Siegen: Geschichtswerkstatt Siegen – Arbeitskreis für Regionalgeschichte e.V. pp. 183–202. ISSN 1431-6684.
- Spielmann, Christian (1909). Geschichte von Nassau (Land und Haus) von den ältesten Zeiten bis zur Gegenwart (in German). Vol. Teil 1. Politische Geschichten. Wiesbaden: P. Plauen.
- Textor von Haiger, Johann (1617). Nassauische Chronik (in German). Herborn: Christoph Raab.
- Vorsterman van Oyen, A.A. (1882). Het vorstenhuis Oranje-Nassau. Van de vroegste tijden tot heden (in Dutch). Leiden/Utrecht: A.W. Sijthoff/J.L. Beijers.

Amalie Louise of Courland House of Kettler Born: 23 July 1687 Died: 18 January 1750
Regnal titles
Vacant Title last held by Elisabeth Juliana Francisca of Hesse-Homburg	Fürstin of Nassau-Siegen (Protestant branch); 13 April 1708 – 13 February 1722	Vacant Title next held by Sophie Polyxena Concordia of Sayn-Wittgenstein-Hohenstein
Succession of underage stepson	Fürstin-Regent of Nassau-Siegen (Protestant branch); 13 February 1722 – 11 November 1727	Stepson became of age
