= Louise Christine of Stolberg-Stolberg-Ortenberg =

Duchess consort of Saxe-Weissenfels
- Tenure: 1712-1736
- Born: 21 January 1675; Ortenberg
- Died: 16 May 1738 (aged 63); Weissenfels
- Spouse: John George III, Count of Mansfeld-Eisleben; Christian, Duke of Saxe-Weissenfels
- House: Stolberg
- Father: Christoph Louis I, Count of Stolberg-Stolberg-Ortenberg
- Mother: Louise Christine of Hesse-Darmstadt

Louise Christine of Stolberg-Stolberg-Ortenberg (21 January 1675 - 16 May 1738), was a German noblewoman member of the House of Stolberg and by her two marriages Countess of Mansfeld-Eisleben and Duchess of Saxe-Weissenfels.

Born in Ortenberg, she was the sixth of the eight children born from the marriage of Christoph Louis I, Count of Stolberg-Stolberg-Ortenberg and Countess Louise Christine of Hesse-Darmstadt. From her seven older and younger siblings, four survive adulthood: Georg, Hereditary Prince of Stolberg-Stolberg-Ortenberg, Sophie Eleonore, Christoph Frederick and Jost Christian.

== Life ==
In Stolberg on 13 December 1704, Louise Christine married firstly John George III, Count of Mansfeld-Eisleben. They had no children. Count John George III died on 1 January 1710.

On 11 May 1712, Louise Christine married secondly Christian, Duke of Saxe-Weissenfels. For this occasion, the Elector Frederick August I of Saxony, had the Weissenfelser Hunt Cup (der Weißenfelser Jagdpokal) made as a gift for the couple. It was a costly and complex masterpiece of gold forging executed by the brothers Johann Melchior and George Christoph Dinglinger; it took as its artistic inspiration the duke's preference for the hunt. The cup stayed in the possession of the ducal house of Saxe-Weissenfels until it became extinct; after this, it again came into the possession of the Electorate of Saxony and can be admired today in the Green Vault (de: Grünes Gewölbe). They had no children.

Louise Christine died in Weissenfels aged 63, having survived her second husband by twenty-three months. She was buried in the Schlosskirche, Weissenfels.

== Bibliography ==
- Vötsch, Jochen. "Luise Christine, Herzogin von Sachsen-Weißenfels (1675–1738)". Sächsische Biografie (in German).

Louise Christine of Stolberg-Stolberg-Ortenberg House of Wettin Born: 21 January 1675 Died: 16 May 1738
German royalty
Vacant Title last held by Fredericka Elisabeth of Saxe-Eisenach	Duchess consort of Saxe-Weissenfels; 1712-1736	Succeeded by Fredericka of Saxe-Gotha-Altenburg
