= Frederick William, Duke of Courland =

Duke of Courland and Semigallia from 1698 to 1711

Friedrich Wilhelm Kettler
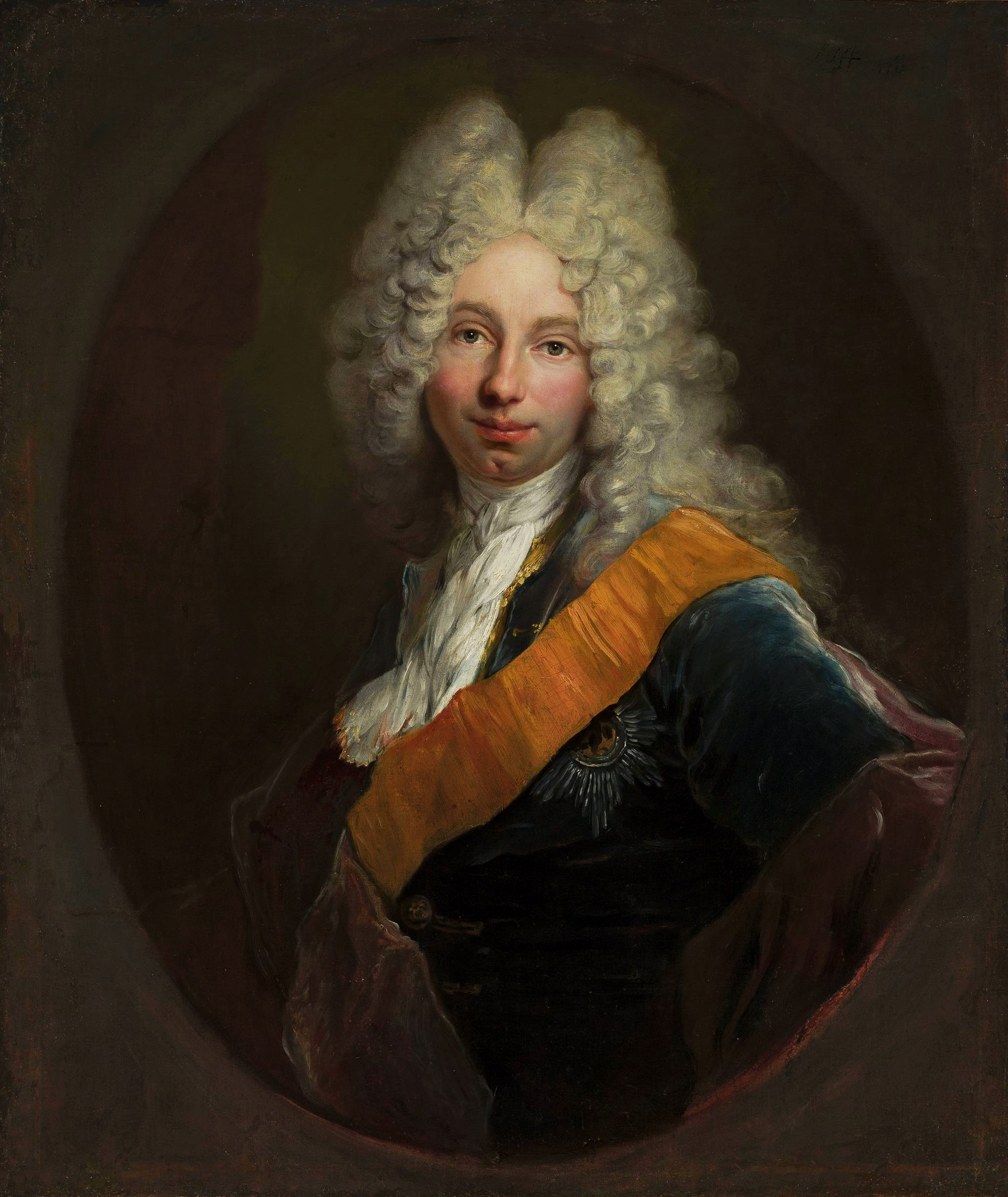
- Portrait, 1711

Duke of Courland and Semigallia
- Reign: 22 January 1698 – 21 January 1711
- Predecessor: Frederick Casimir Kettler
- Successor: Ferdinand Kettler
- Born: 19 July 1692; Mitau, Duchy of Courland and Semigallia
- Died: 21 January 1711 (aged 18); Kippinghof, Ingria, Russian Empire
- Burial: Ducal Crypt of Schloss Mitau
- Spouse: Anna Ioannovna (later Anna of Russia) (m. 1710)
Names
- Frederick William
- House: Kettler
- Father: Frederick Casimir Kettler
- Mother: Margravine Elisabeth Sophie of Brandenburg
- Religion: Lutheranism

Frederick William (German: Friedrich Wilhelm; 19 July 1692 – 21 January 1711) was Duke of Courland and Semigallia from 1698 to 1711. Frederick Wilhelm was the son of Friedrich Kasimir Kettler, Duke of Courland and Semigallia and Princess Elisabeth Sophie of Brandenburg. During his reign, the duchy was occupied by Swedish and later by Russian troops.

== Biography ==
Friedrich Wilhelm Kettler was born in 1692 in Mitau (now Jelgava) in the family of Friedrich Casimir and his second wife Elizabeth Sophia. At the age of five, after his father's death, on 22 January 1698 he was appointed as the Duke of Courland and Semigallia, however, until the age of majority state was governed by his mother and his uncle, Ferdinand Kettler, who resided in Danzig.

When in 1701 Semigallia was occupied by the Swedes, Friedrich Wilhelm and his mother went to the court of Frederick I, the future first king in Prussia. He stayed in Prussia until 1709 when, after Russian victories against Sweden, he was engaged at the age of 17 to Anna of Russia, the daughter of Tsar Ivan V (half brother of Peter the Great). The Council of the Duchy in 1709 recognized Friedrich Wilhelm as an adult and the young Duke arrived in Libau (now Liepāja) in 1710.

He married Anna Ioannovna on 11 November 1710 (31 October, after the old style) in a grand wedding held in the new Russian capital of Saint Petersburg, which presented the power of the emerging Russian Empire and its court brilliance.

However, on the way back from Saint Petersburg, Friedrich Wilhelm died on 21 January 1711 in the postal station, and his widow Anna, together with the Duke's corpse, arrived in Mitau only on 4 March.

== Succession ==
After his death, Anna took on the regency of the duchy. In 1730 she became Empress of Russia and the duchy passed to Friedrich Wilhelm's uncle Ferdinand Kettler, but was de facto controlled by Russia. It was restored to independence in 1737, when it passed to the lover of Tsarina Anna, Ernst Johann Biron.

== Ancestry ==
Ancestors of Frederick William, Duke of Courland

8. William Kettler, Duke of Courland
4. Jacob Kettler, Duke of Courland
9. Duchess Sophie of Prussia
2. Frederick Casimir Kettler, Duke of Courland
10. George William, Elector of Brandenburg
5. Princess Louise Charlotte of Brandenburg
11. Countess Palatine Elisabeth Charlotte
1. Frederick William Kettler, Duke of Courland
12. George William, Elector of Brandenburg (= 10)
6. Frederick William, Elector of Brandenburg
13. Countess Palatine Elisabeth Charlotte (= 11)
3. Princess Elisabeth Sophie of Brandenburg
14. Philip, Duke of Schleswig-Holstein-Sonderburg-Glücksburg
7. Princess Dorothea Sophie of Schleswig-Holstein-Sonderburg-Glücksburg
15. Princess Sophie Hedwig of Saxe-Lauenburg

Regnal titles
Preceded by Frederick Casimir Kettler	Duke of Courland; 1698–1711	Succeeded by Ferdinand Kettler
