= Johanna Magdalene of Saxe-Weissenfels =

Duchess consort of Courland

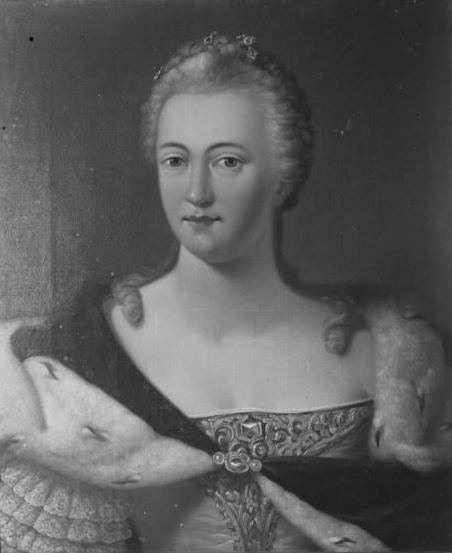

Duchess consort of Courland
- Tenure: 1730–1737
- Born: 17 March 1708
- Died: 25 January 1760 (aged 51)
- Spouse: Ferdinand Kettler
- House: House of Wettin
- Father: Johann Georg, Duke of Saxe-Weissenfels
- Mother: Fredericka Elisabeth of Saxe-Eisenach

Johanna Magdalene of Saxe-Weissenfels (17 March 1708 – 25 January 1760), was a Duchess consort of Courland and by marriage member of the House of Kettler. By birth she was member of the Saxe-Weissenfels line of the House of Wettin.

== Early life ==
She was the only surviving daughter of Johann Georg, Duke of Saxe-Weissenfels, and his wife, Princess Fredericka Elisabeth of Saxe-Eisenach.

== Personal life ==
On 20 September 1730, in Danzig, she married Ferdinand Kettler, the Duke of Courland, who was 75 years old at the time. The marriage remained childless.

Preceded by Anna of Russia	Duchess consort of Courland; 1730-1737	Succeeded by Benigna Gottlieb von Trotha gt Treyden
