= Johann Georg, Duke of Saxe-Weissenfels =

Johann Georg (25 June 1677 – 5 March 1712, Weissenfels), was Duke of Saxe-Weissenfels from 1697 until his death.

== Biography ==
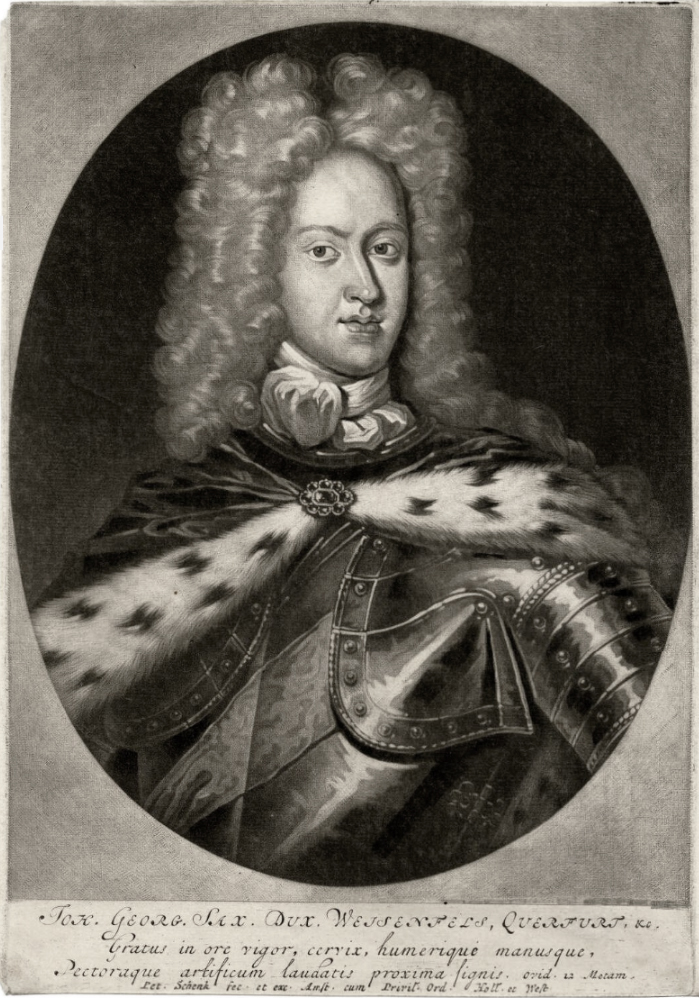
Engraving of Johann Georg by Peter Schenk the Elder, c. 1697–1700

Johann Georg was born in Halle on 25 June 1677 to Johann Adolf I, Duke of Saxe-Weissenfels, and his first wife, Johanna Magdalena of Saxe-Altenburg. He succeeded his father upon Johann Adolf's death on 24 May 1697. Because he was still a minor, the Elector Frederick August I of Saxony briefly assumed a regency.

Like his both predecessors, Johann Georg was interested in developing a flotilla, but he was also a great patron of the arts and sciences. Under his rule Weissenfels became the leading economical and cultural center in central Germany along with Dresden.

To maintain order during civic celebrations, Johann George created the establishment of Citizen Companies (Bürgerkompanien), in whose service male inhabitants were conscripted.

In imitation of the decorations bestowed by the Fruitbearing Society (of which his grandfather was a head) Johann Georg created on 24 June 1704 a medal extolling knightly virtues "De la noble passion" with the motto "J'aime l'honneur, qui vient par la vertu (en: "I love the honor that comes from virtue"). The statutes of the order, which the duke wrote both in German and in French, required an irreproachable life and noble birth for admittance.

During the Great Northern War, Weissenfels was occupied by Swedish troops from 1706 to 1707.

Because he died without surviving male issue, Johann Georg was succeeded by his brother Christian.

== Marriage and issue ==
In Jena on 7 January 1698, Johann Georg married Fredericka Elisabeth of Saxe-Eisenach. They had seven children:

1. Fredericka (b. Weissenfels, 4 August 1701 – d. Weissenfels, 28 February 1706).
2. Johann Georg, Hereditary Prince of Saxe-Weissenfels (b. Weissenfels, 20 October 1702 – d. Weissenfels, 5 March 1703).
3. Johannette Wilhelmine (b. Weissenfels, 31 May 1704 – d. Weissenfels, 9 July 1704).
4. Johannette Amalie (b. Weissenfels, 8 September 1705 – d. Weissenfels, 7 February 1706).
5. Stillborn son (1706).
6. Johanna Magdalene (b. Weissenfels, 17 March 1708 – d. Leipzig, 25 January 1760), married on 5 January 1730 to Ferdinand Kettler, Duke of Courland and Semigallia.
7. Fredericka Amalie (b. Weissenfels, 1 March 1712 – d. Weissenfels, 31 January 1714).

Johann Georg, Duke of Saxe-Weissenfels House of Wettin Born: 25 June 1677 Died: 5 March 1712
Preceded by Johann Adolf I	Duke of Saxe-Weissenfels; 1697–1712	Succeeded by Christian
