= Sophie Amalie of Nassau-Siegen =

German duchess (1650–1688)

- Duchess Consort of Courland
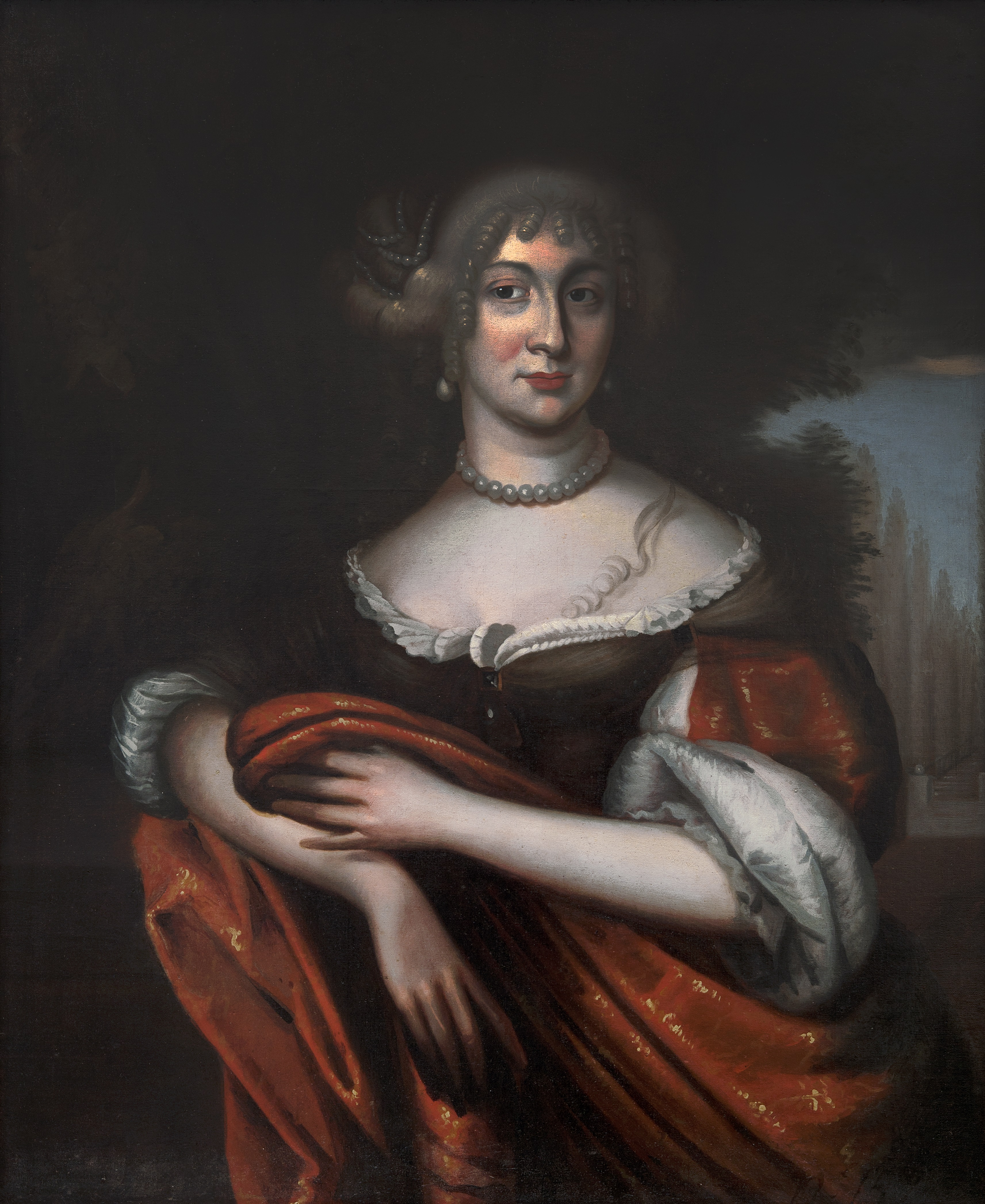
- Duchess Sophie Amelie of Courland, nee Princess of Nassau-Siegen. Anonymous portrait. Nationalmuseum, Stockholm.

- Coat of arms
- Full name: Sophie Amalie Princess of Nassau-Siegen
- Native name: Sophia Amalia Prinzessin von Nassau-Siegen
- Born: Sophia Amalia Gräfin zu Nassau, Katzenelnbogen, Vianden und Diez, Frau zu Beilstein; 10 January 1650^{Jul.} Wisch Castle, Terborg
- Died: 15/25 November 1688; Mitau
- Buried: 16/26 December 1688; Reformed Church, Mitau
- Noble family: House of Nassau-Siegen
- Spouse: Frederick Casimir of Courland (m. 1675)
- Issue Detail: Marie Dorothea, Margravine of Brandenburg-Schwedt; Eleonore Charlotte, Duchess of Brunswick-Lüneburg-Bevern; Amalie Louise, Fürstin of Nassau-Siegen
- Father: Henry of Nassau-Siegen
- Mother: Mary Magdalene of Limburg-Stirum

Princess Sophie Amalie of Nassau-Siegen (10 January 1650^{Jul.} – 15/25 November 1688), German: Sophia Amalia Prinzessin von Nassau-Siegen, official titles: Prinzessin von Nassau, Gräfin zu Katzenelnbogen, Vianden, Diez, Limburg und Bronkhorst, Frau zu Beilstein, Stirum, Wisch, Borculo, Lichtenvoorde und Wildenborch, Erbbannerfrau des Herzogtums Geldern und der Grafschaft Zutphen, was a countess from the House of Nassau-Siegen, a cadet branch of the Ottonian Line of the House of Nassau. In 1664, she was elevated to the rank and title of princess. By marriage she became Duchess Consort of Courland.

== Biography ==
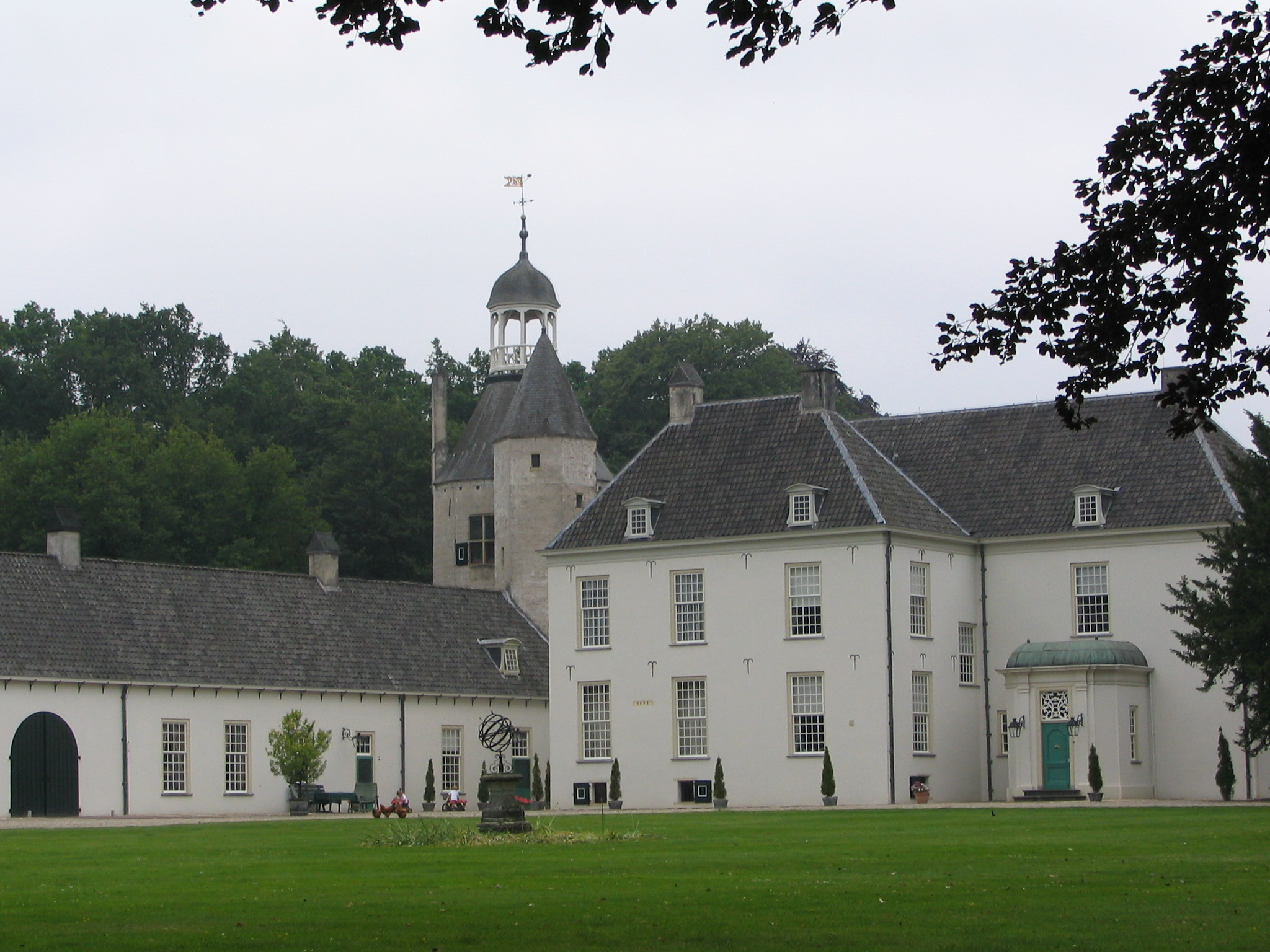
Wisch Castle in Terborg, 2004.

Sophie Amalie was born at Wisch Castle in Terborg on 10 January 1650^{Jul.} (Note: "See the parish registers of Terborg: the 10th at half past seven in the evening. See the notification of birth in the archives of Copenhagen (Tyske Kanc UA, N.-Siegen A I, 1) from Terborg 11/21‑1‑1650: «gestern abend zwischen sieben und acht Uhren». Europäische Stammtafeln I, 117 states born on 20‑2‑1650.") as the second daughter and third child of Count Henry of Nassau-Siegen and his wife Countess Mary Magdalene of Limburg-Stirum. Sophie Amalie was named after her godmother, the Danish-Norwegian Queen Sophie Amalie. In October and November 1652 she first lost her eldest sister Ernestine and then her father Henry. After the death of the father, Sophie Amalie's brothers William Maurice and Frederick Henry were adopted by their uncle Fürst John Maurice of Nassau-Siegen. Together with Sophie Amalie, both brothers were elevated into the Reichsfürstenstand on 6 May 1664.

Sophie Amalie married in The Hague on 5 October 1675^{Greg.} (Note: "See Royal House Archive of the Netherlands IV/1513. According to this document, the marriage contract was signed on 27‑9‑1678 in The Hague. Another copy of the contract signed on the same day, but in Mitau, is to be found in the archives of the princes of Sayn-Wittgenstein-Hohenstein at Wittgenstein Castle in Laasphe, Urk. 187 XXXXVI. It states that the marriage (Beilager) was consummated in The Hague on 5 October (new style) 1675.") to Hereditary Prince Frederick Casimir of Courland (6 July 1650 – 22 January 1698). In 1682, after the death of her father-in-law, Sophie Amalie became Duchess Consort of Courland.

Sophia Amalia died in childbirth in Mitau on 15/25 November 1688 (Note: "See notification of death (State Archives Marburg 4f, Kurland Nr. 8) from Mitau, 26‑11‑1688: «Gestern Morgens umb acht Uhren nachdem Ihro Lbd. zwey Tage nach ihrer Entbindung mit grosser Schwachheit gefallen». See Royal House Archive of the Netherlands IV/1514: «Bericht über Entbindung der Sophia Amalia Fürstin zu Nassau Siegen, verm. Herzg. zu Kurland von einer Tochter am 5/15 November … und der bald darauf am 15/25 November, des Morgens um 8 Uhr, erfolgte Ableben der Kindbetterin, deren Leichnam am 16/26 Dezember des Abends am 7 Uhr in die reformierte Kirche zu Mitau überführt wurde». According to Europäische Stammtafeln and Dek (1970) the death occurred on 25‑12‑1688.") and was buried in the Reformed Church in Mitau on 16/26 December.

== Issue ==
From the marriage of Sophie Amalie and Frederick Casimir the following children were born:

1. Frederick Kettler (3 April 1682 – 11 February 1683), Hereditary Prince of Courland.
2. Marie Dorothea Kettler (2 August 1684 – 17 January 1743), married to Margrave Albert Frederick of Brandenburg-Schwedt.
3. Eleonore Charlotte Kettler (11 June 1686 – 28 July 1748), married to Duke Ernest Ferdinand of Brunswick-Wolfenbüttel-Bevern.
4. Amalie Louise Kettler (Mitau, 23 July 1687 (Note: "Although Dek (1970) and Europäische Stammtafeln I, 117 and II, 88 say that she was born on 27‑7‑1687, we could establish that the birth took place in Mitau on the 23rd. Indeed, the notification that the Duke of Courland sent from Mitau on 24‑7‑1687 announces the birth of a daughter «gestern morgens» (see State Archives Wiesbaden 170^{III}).") – Untere Schloss, Siegen, 18 January 1750), married at the Old Castle in Bayreuth on 13 April 1708 to Fürst Frederick William Adolf of Nassau-Siegen (Nassauischer Hof, Siegen, 20 February 1680 – Nassauischer Hof, Siegen, 13 February 1722).
5. Christina Sophia Kettler (15 November 1688 – 22 April 1694).
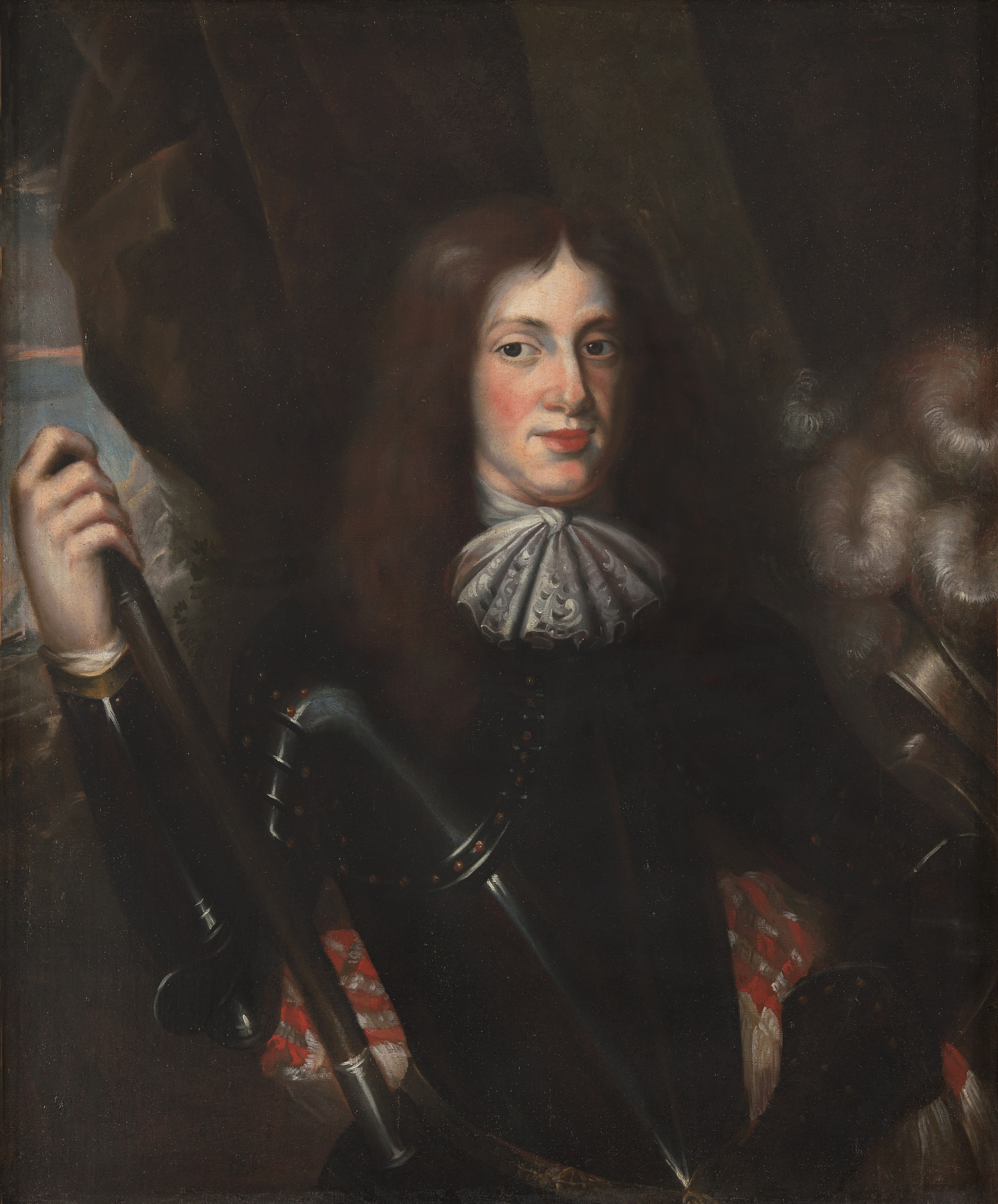
Duke Frederick Casimir of Courland. Anonymous portrait, 17th century. Gripsholm Castle.

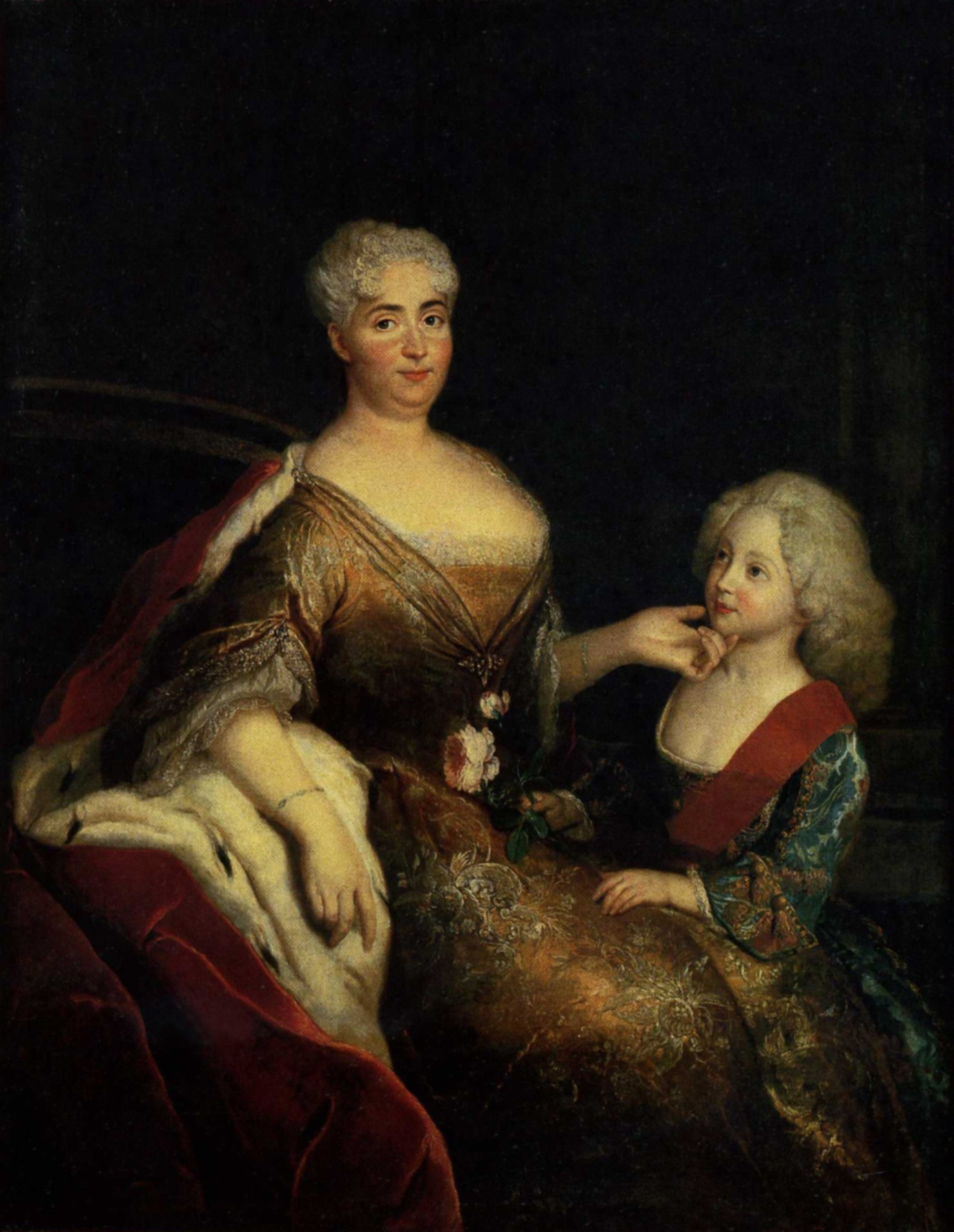
Margravine Marie Dorothea of Brandenburg-Schwedt with her son. Portrait by Antoine Pesne, ca. 1719. Preußen-Museum Minden.

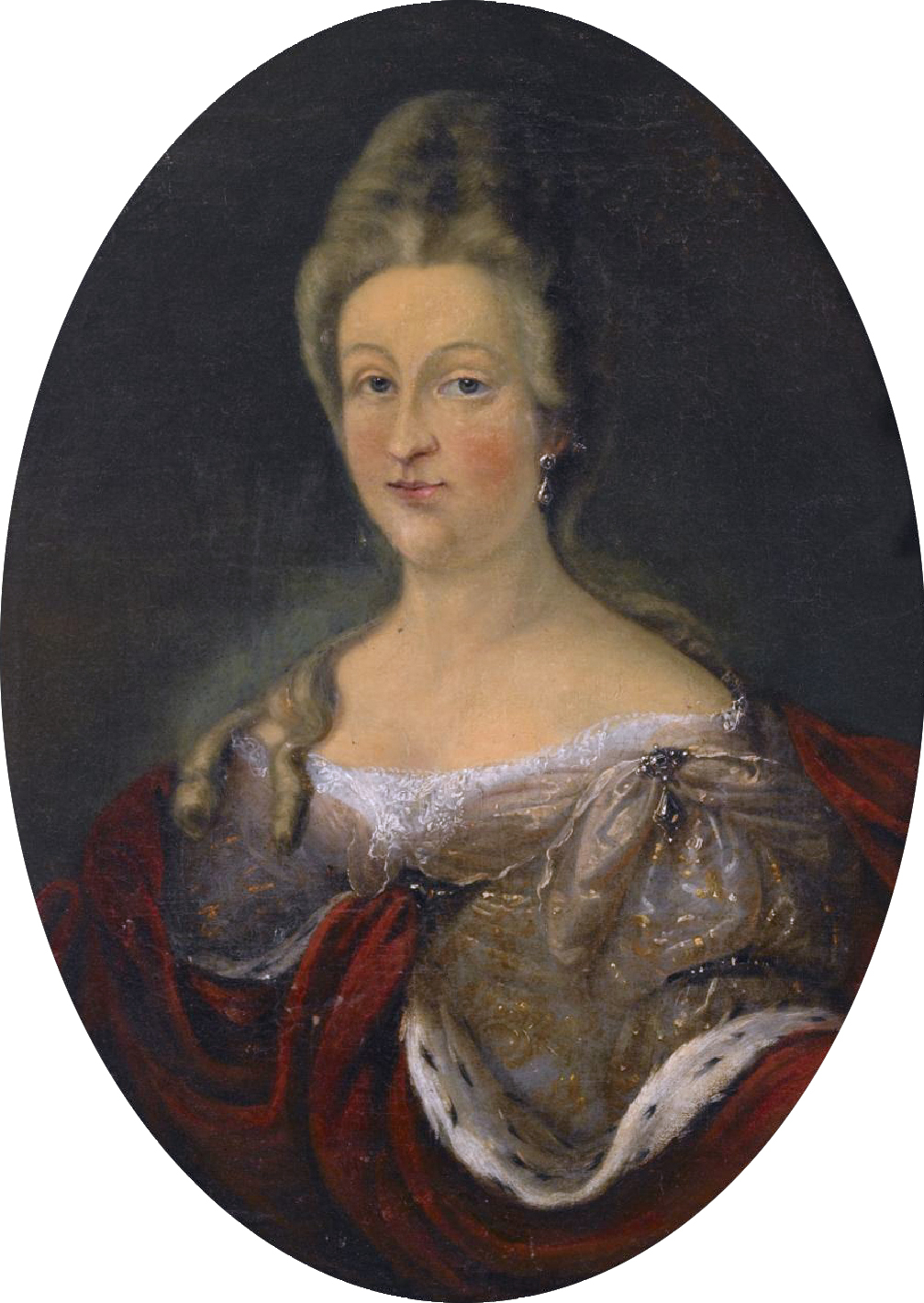
Duchess Eleonore Charlotte of Brunswick-Lüneburg-Bevern. Anonymous portrait, 18th century.

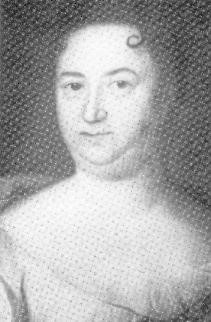
Fürstin Amalie Louise of Nassau-Siegen. Detail of a anonymous portrait, first quarter 18th century. Siegerlandmuseum, Siegen.

== Ancestors ==
Ancestors of Sophie Amalie of Nassau-Siegen
Great-great-grandparents	William I 'the Rich' of Nassau-Siegen (1487–1559) ⚭ 1531; Juliane of Stolberg-Wernigerode (1506–1580)	George III of Leuchtenberg (1502–1555) ⚭ 1528; Barbara of Brandenburg-Ansbach (1495–1552)	Christian III of Denmark (1503–1559) ⚭ 1525; Dorothea of Saxe-Lauenburg (1511–1571)	Ernest V of Brunswick-Grubenhagen (1518–1567) ⚭ 1547; Margaret of Pomerania (1518–1569)	Herman George of Limburg-Stirum (1540–1574) ⚭ 1557; Mary of Hoya (1534–1612)	Otto IV of Holstein-Schauenburg-Pinneberg (ca. 1517–1576) ⚭ 1558; Elisabeth Ursula of Brunswick-Lüneburg (1539–1586)	Eberwin III of Bentheim-Steinfurt (1536–1562) ⚭ 1553; Anna of Tecklenburg-Schwerin (1532–1582)	Gumprecht II of Neuenahr-Alpen (ca. 1503–1555) ⚭ 1542; Amöna of Daun-Falkenstein (ca. 1520–ca. 1582)
Great-grandparents	John VI 'the Elder' of Nassau-Siegen (1536–1606) ⚭ 1559; Elisabeth of Leuchtenberg (1537–1579)		John 'the Younger' of Schleswig-Holstein-Sonderburg (1545–1622) ⚭ 1568; Elisabeth of Brunswick-Grubenhagen (1550–1586)		Jobst of Limburg-Stirum (1560–1621) ⚭ 1591; Mary of Holstein-Schauenburg-Pinneberg (1559–1616)		Arnold IV of Bentheim-Tecklenburg (1554–1606) ⚭ 1573; Magdalena of Neuenahr-Alpen (1553–1627)	
Grandparents	John VII 'the Middle' of Nassau-Siegen (1561–1623) ⚭ 1603; Margaret of Schleswig-Holstein-Sonderburg (1583–1658)				George Ernest of Limburg-Stirum (1593–1661) ⚭ 1603; Magdalene of Bentheim-Tecklenburg (1591–1649)			
Parents	Henry of Nassau-Siegen (1611–1652) ⚭ 1646; Mary Magdalene of Limburg-Stirum (1632–1707)							

== Sources ==
- Aßmann, Helmut & Menk, Friedhelm (1996). Auf den Spuren von Nassau und Oranien in Siegen (in German). Siegen: Gesellschaft für Stadtmarketing Siegen e.V.
- Behr, Kamill (1854). Genealogie der in Europa regierenden Fürstenhäuser (in German). Leipzig: Verlag von Bernhard Tauchnitz.
- Dek, A.W.E. (1962). Graf Johann der Mittlere von Nassau-Siegen und seine 25 Kinder (in German). Rijswijk: Krips Repro.
- Dek, A.W.E. (1968). "De afstammelingen van Juliana van Stolberg tot aan het jaar van de Vrede van Münster". Spiegel der Historie. Maandblad voor de geschiedenis der Nederlanden (in Dutch). 1968 (7/8): 228–303.
- Dek, A.W.E. (1970). Genealogie van het Vorstenhuis Nassau (in Dutch). Zaltbommel: Europese Bibliotheek.
- von Ehrenkrook, Hans Friedrich; Förster, Karl & Marchtaler, Kurt Erhard (1928). Ahnenreihen aus allen deutschen Gauen. Beilage zum Archiv für Sippenforschung und allen verwandten Gebieten (in German). Görlitz: Verlag für Sippenforschung und Wappenkunde C.A. Starke.
- Huberty, Michel; Giraud, Alain & Magdelaine, F. & B. (1981). l'Allemagne Dynastique (in French). Vol. Tome III: Brunswick-Nassau-Schwarzbourg. Le Perreux: Alain Giraud.
- Huberty, Michel; Giraud, Alain & Magdelaine, F. & B. (1994). l'Allemagne Dynastique (in French). Vol. Tome VII: Oldenbourg-Familles alliées H-L. Le Perreux-sur-Marne: Alain Giraud.
- Lück, Alfred (1981) [1967]. Siegerland und Nederland (in German) (2nd ed.). Siegen: Siegerländer Heimatverein e.V.
- Menk, Friedhelm (1971). Quellen zur Geschichte des Siegerlandes im niederländischen königlichen Hausarchiv (in German). Siegen: Stadt Siegen/Forschungsstelle Siegerland.
- Neander, Irene (1961). "Friedrich Kasimir Kettler". Neue Deutsche Biographie (in German). Vol. Band 5. Berlin: Duncker & Humblot. pp. 513–514. ISBN 3-428-00186-9.
- Schiemann, Theodor (1882). "Friedrich Casimir Kettler". Allgemeine Deutsche Biographie (in German). Vol. Band 15. Leipzig: Duncker & Humblot. pp. 685–688.
- Textor von Haiger, Johann (1617). Nassauische Chronik (in German). Herborn: Christoph Raab.
- Vorsterman van Oyen, A.A. (1882). Het vorstenhuis Oranje-Nassau. Van de vroegste tijden tot heden (in Dutch). Leiden/Utrecht: A.W. Sijthoff/J.L. Beijers.

Sophie Amalie of Nassau-Siegen House of Nassau-Siegen (Protestant branch) Born: 10 January 1650^{Jul.} Died: 15/25 December 1688
Regnal titles
Preceded by Louise Charlotte of Brandenburg	Duchess Consort of Courland; 2 January 1682 – 15/25 December 1688	Succeeded by Elisabeth Sophie of Brandenburg
