= Christian, Duke of Saxe-Weissenfels =

Duke of Saxe-Weissenfels (r. 1712–1736; 1682–1736)

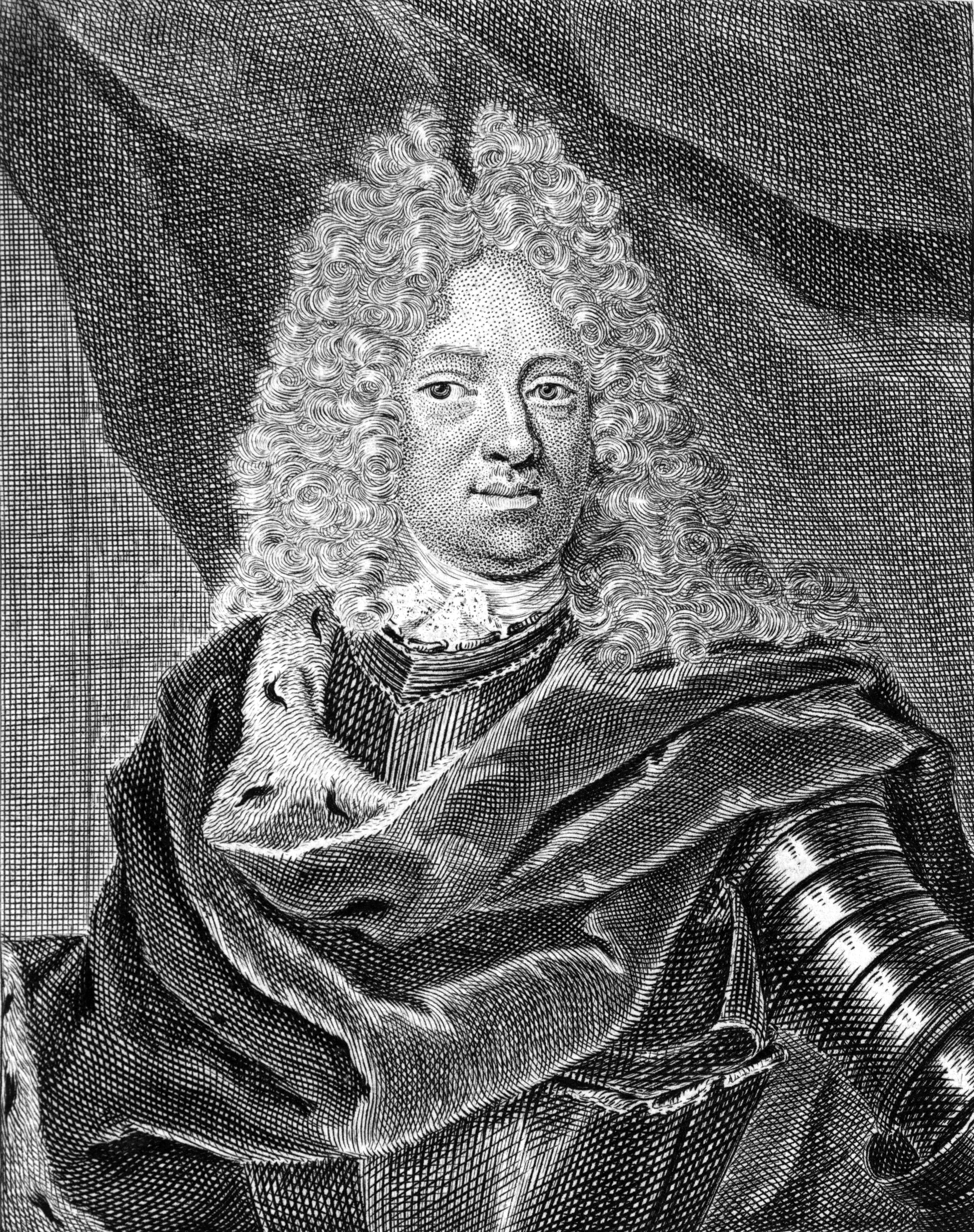
Christian, Duke of Saxe-Weissenfels

Christian (23 February 1682 – 28 June 1736) was Duke of Saxe-Weissenfels from 1712 until his death.

== Biography ==
Christian was born in Weissenfels on 23 February 1682, the second surviving son of Johann Adolf I, Duke of Saxe-Weissenfels, and his first wife, Johanna Magdalena of Saxe-Altenburg. He inherited the Duchy of Saxe-Weissenfels in 1712, following the death of his elder brother Johann Georg, who had no living male children.

Christian continued the policy of patronage and promotion of the sciences, education, and culture of his predecessors; in this tradition he created the Seminarium illustre in Weissenfels in 1716. His liberal spending, which far exceeded the resources of his small duchy, led to a complete financial collapse in 1719. To deal with the crisis, the Electorate of Saxony created a debit commission that controlled the finances of the duchy until its male line was extinct (both the duke and his brother had no male descendants). The commission was requested by the Emperor Charles VI of Austria; it substantially limited the duke's capacity to shape political policies.

== Bach cantatas ==
For Christian's 31st birthday in the year 1713, the composer Johann Sebastian Bach wrote the famous cantata Was mir behagt, ist nur die muntre Jagd, BWV 208 (The Lively Hunt Is All My Heart's Desire) as occasional music with a pastoral character. It was performed in Weissenfels in the evening after a hunting party. Christian is named four times in Salomon Franck's libretto for the cantata and equated with the classical deity Pan. The hunt is characterized as an activity suitable for princes.

Franck was the Weimar court poet, and it is probable that the Hunting Cantata was intended by Duke Wilhelm Ernst of Saxe-Weimar as a gift for Christian. However, Bach received later commissions directly from the court at Weissenfels. For Christian's 43rd birthday in 1725 Bach wrote the Shepherd cantata Entfliehet, verschwindet, entweichet, ihr Sorgen, BWV 249a (Escape, Disappear, Disperse, Ye Sorrows); its music is lost but survived as the parody setting of the Easter Oratorio. In 1729 Bach wrote O angenehme Melodei, BWV 210a for the duke's visit to Leipzig.

== Marriage and succession ==
In Stolberg on 12 May 1712, Christian married Louise Christine of Stolberg-Stolberg-Ortenberg, Dowager Countess of Mansfeld-Eisleben.

For this occasion, the Elector Frederick August I of Saxony, had the Weissenfelser Hunt Cup (der Weißenfelser Jagdpokal) made as a gift for the couple. It was a costly and complex masterpiece of gold forging executed by the brothers Johann Melchior and George Christoph Dinglinger; it took as its artistic inspiration the duke's preference for the hunt. The cup stayed in the possession of the ducal house of Saxe-Weissenfels until it became extinct; after this, it again came into the possession of the Electorate of Saxony and can be admired today in the Green Vault (de: Grünes Gewölbe).

Christian's marriage was childless. Without heirs, he was succeeded on his death by his younger brother, Johann Adolf II.

Christian, Duke of Saxe-Weissenfels House of Wettin Born: 6 February 1682 Died: 23 June 1736
Preceded by Johann Georg	Duke of Saxe-Weissenfels; 1712–1736	Succeeded by Johann Adolf II
