= Princess Louise Charlotte of Brandenburg =

Louise Charlotte of Brandenburg
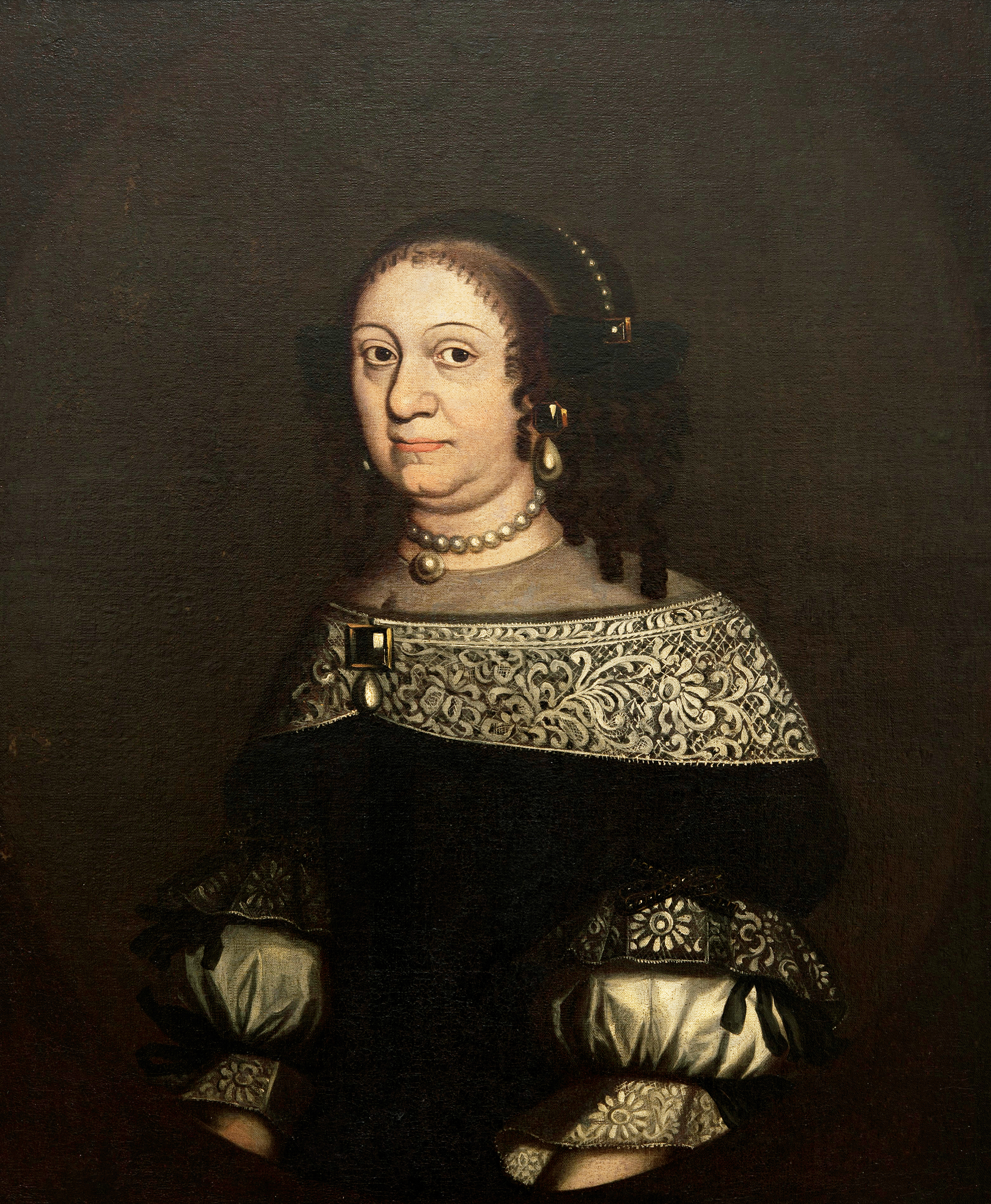
- Contemporary portrait, 17th century

Duchess consort of Courland
- Tenure: 9 October 1645 – 29 August 1676
- Born: 13 September 1617; Berlin, Brandenburg-Prussia
- Died: 28 August 1676 (aged 58); Mitau, Duchy of Courland and Semigallia
- Spouse: Duke Jacob Kettler of Courland (m. 1645)
- Issue: Louise Elisabeth, Landgravine of Hesse-Homburg; Frederick Casimir Kettler, Duke of Courland; Charlotte Sophia, Abbess of Herford; Maria Amalia, Landgravine of Hesse-Kassel; Charles Jacob Kettler; Ferdinand Kettler; Alexander Kettler
- House: House of Hohenzollern
- Father: George William, Elector of Brandenburg
- Mother: Elizabeth Charlotte of the Palatinate

Louise Charlotte of Brandenburg (13 September 1617 – 28 August 1676), was a Duchess consort of Courland by marriage to Duke Jacob Kettler of Courland.

She was born to George William, Elector of Brandenburg and Elizabeth Charlotte of the Palatinate.

== Life ==
Nicknamed "Lisgen" as a child. Raised as a Calvinist, she practiced this faith all her life. In 1638 her family moved to Königsberg where she made contact with local group of poets led by Simon Dach.

After Louise Charlotte reached maturity she received first marriage proposals. In total she was proposed to eight times. Among others were King of Poland Władysław IV. However, Louise Charlotte and her parents decided in favour of prince of Courland Jacob Kettler, who was a second cousin of Louise Charlotte.

=== Courland ===
They married on 9 October 1645. A poem was composed for the wedding by Simon Dach. After the wedding the new couple moved to Goldingen and later to Mitau.

Louise Charlotte is attributed to have had a large influence over the policy of state during the reign of her consort. She worked with her brother in the interest of Brandenburg, but is also credited to have contributed to the greatness of Courland during her tenure.

She received several manors as a dowry, and administered them very wise and practically. She actively established gardens there and developed dairying. Also she was known as fair and kind landlord to her peasants.

When in 1657 Swedes invaded in Courland Louise Charlotte managed to receive a promise from Swedish general Jakob De la Gardie to spare her manors and peasants.

In 1658 she, together with Duke Jacob and all the family were kept as prisoners by the Swedes in Riga and later in Ivangorod. They were eventually released and were able to return to their duchy only in 1660, but all their properties and land was heavily devastated.

The negotiations between Brandenburg, Russia, Sweden and Poland took place in Mitau during her de facto reign.

== Issue ==
Name	Birth	Death	Notes
Louise Elisabeth Kettler	12 August 1646	16 December 1690	married Frederick II, Landgrave of Hesse-Homburg; had issue; died aged 44
Ladislaus Louis Frederick Kettler	14 December 1647	31 March 1648	died aged 3 months
Christina Sophia Kettler	15 May 1649	9 June 1651	died aged 2
Frederick II Casimir Kettler	6 July 1650	22 January 1698	married (1) Countess Sophie Amalie of Nassau-Siegen; had issue (2) Margravine Elisabeth Sophie of Brandenburg; had issue; died aged 48
Charlotte Sophia Kettler	17 September 1651	1 December 1728	never married; became the Abbess in Herford; died aged 76
Maria Amalia Anna Kettler	12 June 1653	16 June 1711	married Charles I, Landgrave of Hesse-Kassel; had issue; died aged 58
Charles Jacob Kettler	20 October 1654	29 December 1677	never married; died aged 23
Ferdinand Kettler	2 November 1655	4 May 1737	married Princess Johanna Magdalene of Saxe-Weissenfels; no issue; died aged 81
Alexander Kettler	16 October 1658	28 June 1686	never married; died aged 27

Princess Louise Charlotte of Brandenburg House of Hohenzollern Born: 13 September 1617 Died: 29 August 1676
Preceded by Duchess Sophie of Prussia	Duchess consort of Courland; 1645–1676	Succeeded by Sophie Amalie of Nassau-Siegen
