= Frederick Casimir Kettler =

Duke of Courland and Semigallia from 1682 to 1698

Friedrich Casimir Kettler
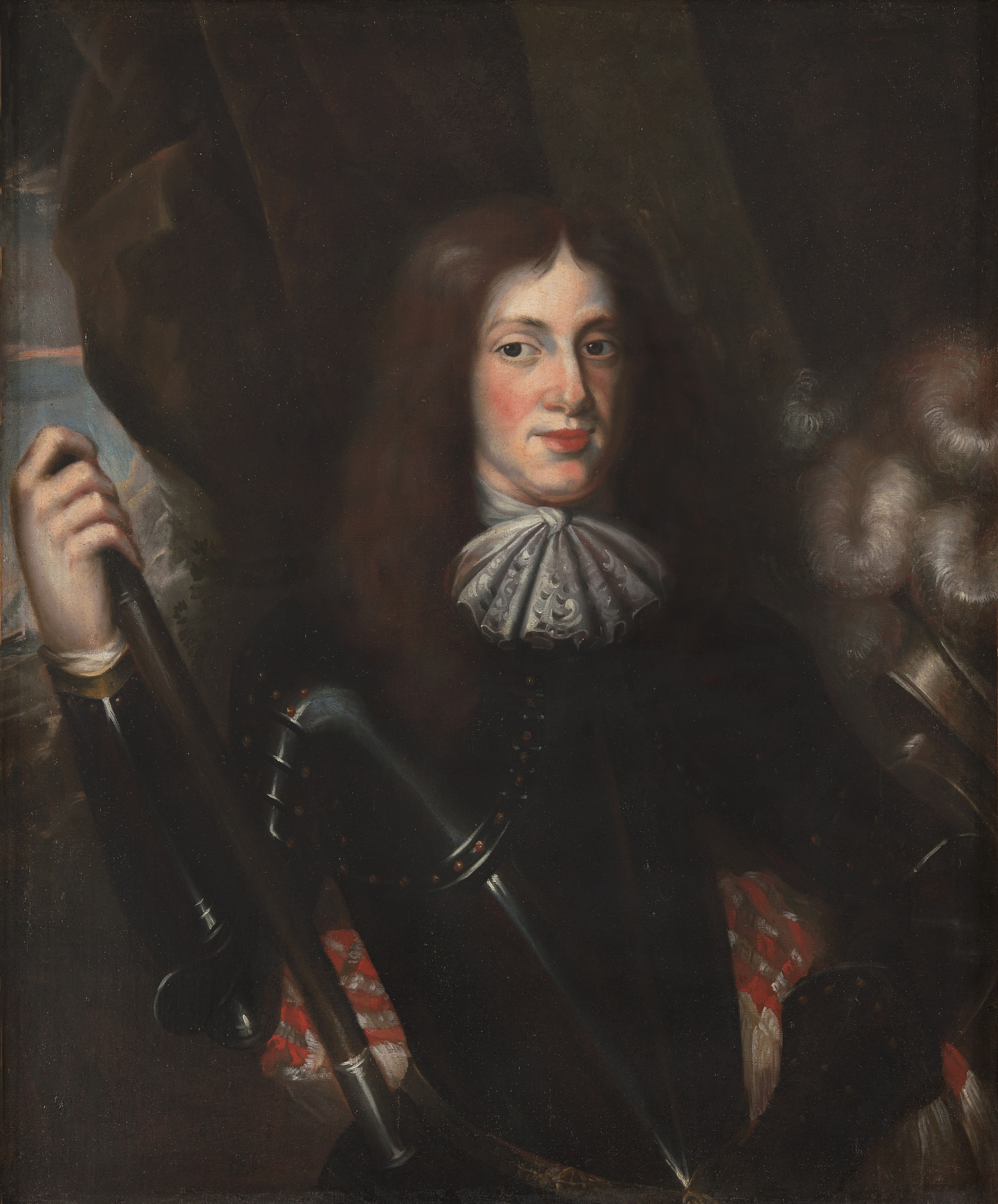

Duke of Courland and Semigallia
- Reign: 1 January 1682 – 22 January 1698
- Predecessor: Jacob Kettler
- Successor: Frederick Wilhelm Kettler
- Born: 6 July 1650; Mitau
- Died: 22 January 1698 (aged 47); Mitau
- Burial: Ducal crypt in Schloss Mitau
- Spouse: Sophie Amalie of Nassau-Siegen (m. 1675; died 1688) Elisabeth Sophie of Brandenburg (m. 1691)
- Issue: Frederick Wilhelm Kettler
- House: House of Kettler
- Father: Jacob Kettler
- Mother: Louise Charlotte of Brandenburg
- Religion: Lutheranism

Frederick Casimir Kettler (German: Friedrich Casimir Kettler; 6 July 1650 – 22 January 1698) was Duke of Courland and Semigallia from 1682 to 1698. Frederick Casimir was the son of Jacob Kettler and Louise Charlotte of Brandenburg. In his reign the Duchy lost its geopolitical position and became Sweden, Prussia and Russia's territorial subject of interests.

== Biography ==
Frederick Casimir Kettler studied law in Germany and visited a number of European courts. In 1673 he was in the Dutch military service and took part with his Courland regiment in the Franco-Dutch War. On 5 October 1675, in The Hague, Frederick Casimir married princess Sophie Amalie of Nassau-Siegen and returned home. After his father died Frederick Casimir became the Duke of Courland and Semigallia and vigorously resorted to public affairs. In 1684 the duke's book printer George Radeckis in Jelgava became the first person to print books in the Latvian language. His efforts to restore the holdings were stopped by the power of Sweden, which at that time prevailed in northern Europe. However, Friedrich Casimir founded splendid court life according to the best Western models.

In 1688 Sophie Amalie died. In 1691 Frederick Casimir celebrated a large-scale wedding with Elisabeth Sophie of Brandenburg.

During the reign of Frederick Casimir, trade and industry of the duchy started to decay. In 1693 the Tobago colony was sold to England. In the spring of 1697, Friedrich Casimir received a grand delegation from Russia, including the new Tsar Peter I, on whom the Jelgava Palace and its court left a great impression. The duchy and Russia held diplomatic talks on mutual cooperation against the Swedes, but in the next winter of 1698, Frederick Casimir died at the age of 47. His minor son Frederick Wilhelm became the next duke.

== Issue ==
From first marriage:

- Frederick Kettler (3 April 1682 – 11 February 1683), Hereditary Prince of Courland.
- Marie Dorothea Kettler (2 August 1684 – 17 January 1743), married to Albert Frederick, Margrave of Brandenburg-Schwedt.
- Eleonore Charlotte Kettler (11 June 1686 – 28 July 1748), married to Ernest Ferdinand, Duke of Brunswick-Lüneburg in Bevern.
- Amalie Louise Kettler (Mitau, 23 July 1687 (Note: “Although Dek (1970) and Europäische Stammtafeln I, 117 and II, 88 say that she was born on 27‑7‑1687, we could establish that the birth took place in Mitau on the 23rd. Indeed, the notification that the Duke of Courland sent from Mitau on 24‑7‑1687 announces the birth of a daughter «gestern morgens» (see State Archives Wiesbaden 170^{III}).”) – Untere Schloss, Siegen, 18 January 1750), married at the Old Castle in Bayreuth on 13 April 1708 to Fürst Frederick William Adolf of Nassau-Siegen (Nassauischer Hof, Siegen, 20 February 1680 – Nassauischer Hof, Siegen, 13 February 1722).
- Christina Sophia Kettler (15 November 1688 – 22 April 1694).

From second marriage:

- Frederick William Kettler, Duke of Courland (19 July 1692 – 21 January 1711), married to Grand Duchess Anna Ioannovna of Russia.
- Leopold Charles Kettler (14 December 1693 – 21 July 1697).

== Bibliography ==
- Dek, A.W.E. (1970). Genealogie van het Vorstenhuis Nassau (in Dutch). Zaltbommel: Europese Bibliotheek.
- Huberty, Michel; Giraud, Alain; Magdelaine, F. & B. (1981). l’Allemagne Dynastique (in French). Vol. Tome III: Brunswick-Nassau-Schwarzbourg. Le Perreux: Alain Giraud.
- Irene Neander (1961). "Friedrich Kasimir Kettler". Neue Deutsche Biographie (in German). Vol. 5. Berlin: Duncker & Humblot. pp. 513–514. (full text online).
- Theodor Schiemann (1882). "Kettler" . Allgemeine Deutsche Biographie (in German). Vol. 15. Leipzig: Duncker & Humblot. pp. 685–688.

Preceded by Jacob Kettler	Duke of Courland; 1682–1698	Succeeded by Frederick Wilhelm, Duke of Courland
