= Ferdinand Kettler =

Duke of Courland and Semigallia from 1730 to 1737

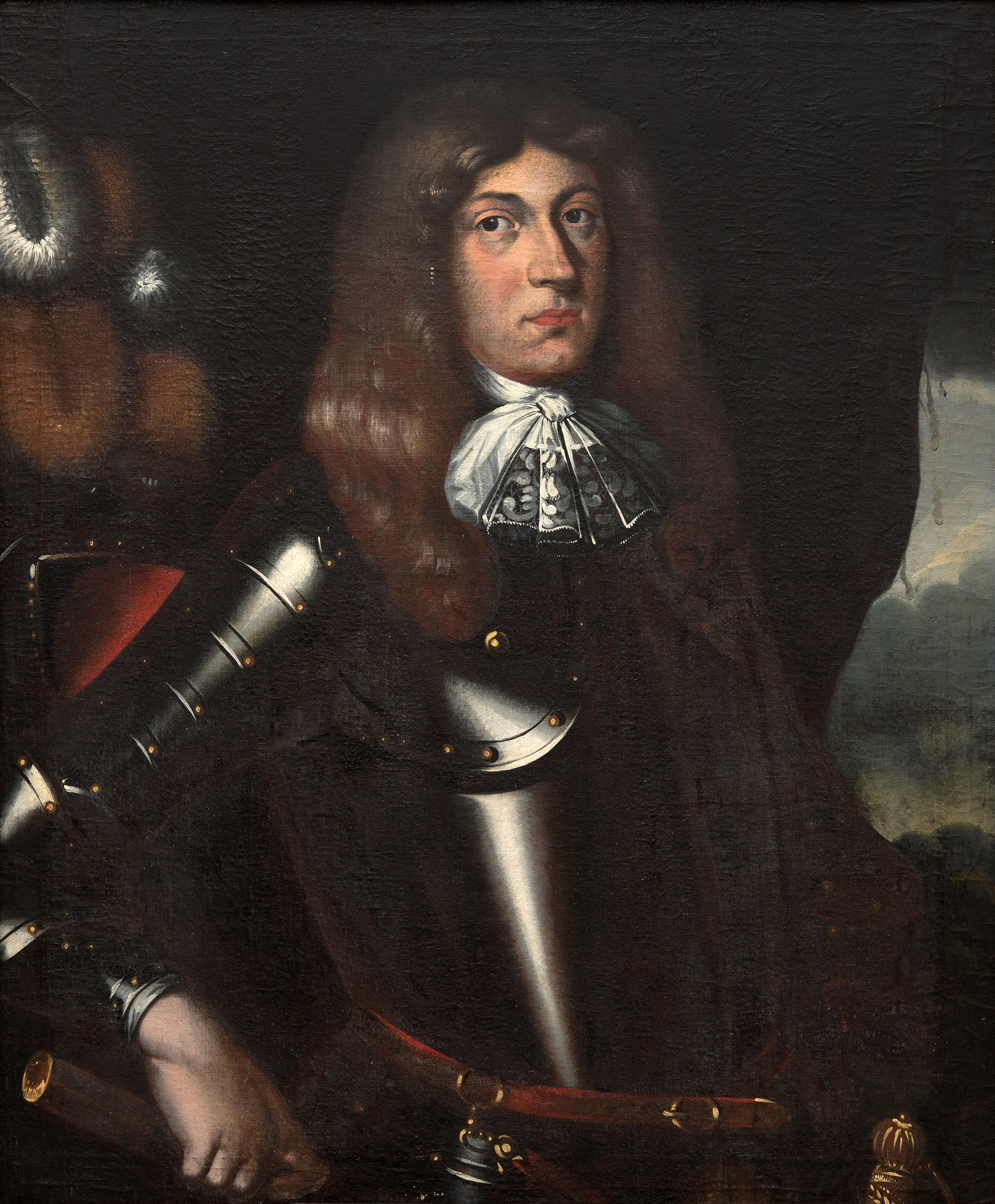
- Portrait by an unknown Swedish painter, 18th century

Duke of Courland and Semigallia
- Reign: 21 January 1730 – 4 May 1737
- Predecessor: Friedrich Wilhelm Kettler
- Successor: Ernst Johann von Biron
- Born: 1 November 1655; Mitau, Duchy of Courland and Semigallia
- Died: 4 May 1737 (aged 81); Danzig, Polish–Lithuanian Commonwealth
- Spouse: Johanna Magdalene of Saxe-Weissenfels
- House: Kettler
- Father: Jacob Kettler
- Mother: Louise Charlotte of Brandenburg
- Religion: Lutheranism

Ferdinand Kettler (November 1, 1655 - May 4, 1737) was Duke of Courland and Semigallia from 1730 to 1737. He was married to Johanna Magdalene of Saxe-Weissenfels in 1730.

== Early life ==
Ferdinand Kettler was the son of Jacob Kettler and Louise Charlotte of Brandenburg. He was born on November 1, 1655, in Mitau. He and his family were held captive by the Swedes in Riga. They were moved to Ivangorod, then part of Swedish Ingermanland, and held there between 1658 and 1660.

After the death of his father, Jacob Kettler, in 1682, the duchy passed to Ferdinand's older brother, Frederick Casimir Kettler. Frederick was in the Polish army, where he reached the rank of Lieutenant-General and participated in many battles against the Ottoman Empire. After Frederick's death in 1698, his widow and Ferdinand became guardians of the minor heir, Friedrich Wilhelm Kettler, and ruled the duchy in his name.

== Later life ==
When the Great Northern War started in 1700, Ferdinand fought in battles near Riga. After his defeat in the Battle of Daugava, he fled to Danzig, where he stayed until his death. The council of the duchy (Landtag) under Swedish occupation refused to recognize Ferdinand as duke.

Meanwhile, Friedrich Wilhelm Kettler had married Anna of Russia. When Friedrich Wilhelm died, he left Ferdinand as the last heir to the throne of Courland from the House of Kettler. However, Ferdinand was reluctant to return, and the duchy was instead ruled by Anna of Russia, who acted as regent. In 1725, the Council of the Duchy elected Maurice de Saxe as the new duke. However, he soon left Courland because of friction with the Russian imperial administration.

In 1730, Ferdinand, then 75 years old, married young Princess Johanna Magdalene of Saxe-Weissenfels. That same year, Anna of Russia became tsarina of the Russian Empire. The Council of the Duchy finally recognized Ferdinand as duke. However, in 1736, the King of Poland, August III, in a private meeting, offered the throne of Courland to Ernst Johann von Biron. Biron was Anna's lover and had great influence on state affairs.

Ferdinand died in Danzig, Poland, on May 4, 1737. He had no children. A month later, the Council of the Duchy elected Ernst Johann von Biron as the new Duke of Courland and Semigallia.

== Sources ==
- Irene Neander (1961). "Ferdinand Kettler". Neue Deutsche Biographie (in German). Vol. 5. Berlin: Duncker & Humblot. pp. 90–91. (full text online).

Preceded by Frederick Wilhelm, Duke of Courland	Duke of Courland; 1730–1737	Succeeded by Ernst Johann von Biron
