= Princess Elisabeth Sophie of Brandenburg =

Elisabeth Sophie of Brandenburg
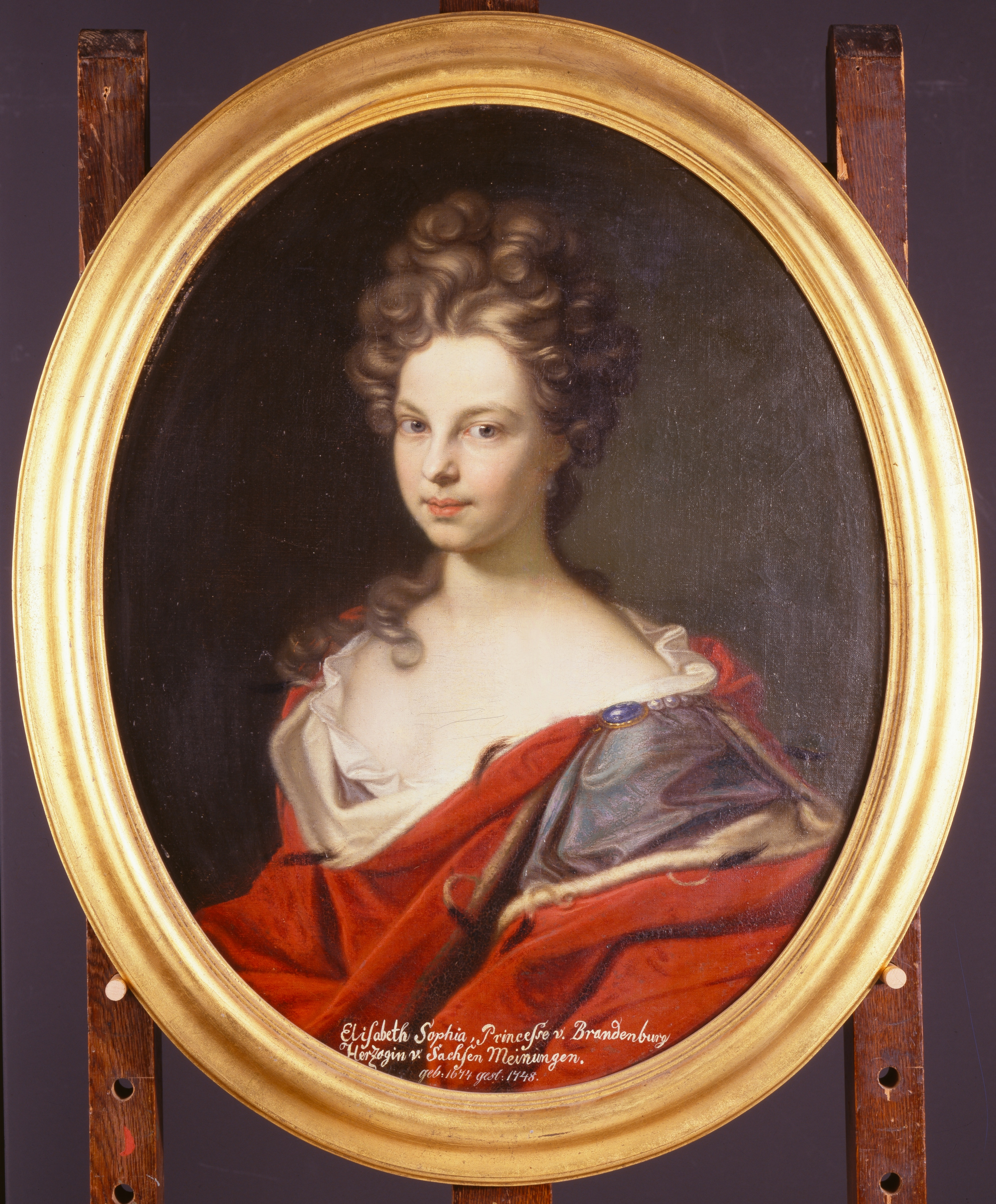
- 1691 portrait

Duchess consort of Courland
- Tenure: 29 April 1691 – 22 January 1698

Margravine consort of Brandenburg-Bayreuth
- Tenure: 30 March 1703 – 20 May 1712

Duchess consort of Saxe-Meiningen
- Tenure: 3 June 1714 – 24 November 1724
- Born: 5 April 1674; Cölln, Brandenburg-Prussia
- Died: 22 November 1748 (aged 74); Römhild, Sachsen-Meiningen
- Spouse: Frederick Casimir Kettler of Courland (m. 1691; died 1698) Christian Ernst, Margrave of Brandenburg-Bayreuth (m. 1703; died 1712) Ernst Ludwig I, Duke of Saxe-Meiningen (m. 1714; died 1724)
- Issue: Frederick William, Duke of Courland; Leopold Charles Kettler
- House: Hohenzollern
- Father: Frederick William, Elector of Brandenburg
- Mother: Sophia Dorothea of Schleswig-Holstein-Sonderburg-Glücksburg

Elisabeth Sophie of Brandenburg (5 April 1674 – 22 November 1748), was a Duchess consort of Courland by marriage to Duke Frederick Casimir Kettler of Courland, a Margravine consort of Brandenburg-Bayreuth by marriage to Christian Ernst, Margrave of Brandenburg-Bayreuth, and a Duchess consort of Saxe-Meiningen by marriage to Ernst Ludwig I, Duke of Saxe-Meiningen. She was joint regent in Courland during the minority of her son Frederick William, Duke of Courland from 1698 until 1701.

== Biography ==
Elisabeth Sophie was born to Frederick William I, Elector of Brandenburg and his second wife, Duchess Sophia Dorothea of Schleswig-Holstein-Sonderburg-Glücksburg.

=== Courland ===
She married (29 April 1691) her cousin, Duke Frederick Casimir Kettler of Courland. The marriage was arranged as an alliance between the two families; in 1703 her brother Albert Frederick was to marry her first husband's daughter, Mary Dorothea.

When her husband died in 1698, Elisabeth Sophie became joint guardian-regent along with her former brother-in-law Ferdinand. In January 1701, Elisabeth Sophie left Courland, her son and stepdaughter for her brother's court in Berlin. In 1703, she was formally deprived of the custody of her son and the regency. She was later given a Russian allowance from Anna of Russia.

=== Brandenburg-Bayreuth ===
She married Christian Ernst, Margrave of Brandenburg-Bayreuth (6 August 1644 – 20 May 1712) on 30 March 1703 in Potsdam. She is said to have dominated him completely and directed his policy in a pro-Prussian direction. He gave her the palace Markgräfliches Schloss Erlangen, which was named after her. She was described as proud and a great lover of pomp and ceremony. Her expenses had a bad effect on the finances of the state.

=== Saxe-Meiningen ===
She married on 3 June 1714 on Schloss Ehrenburg to Ernst Ludwig I, Duke of Saxe-Meiningen (1672–1724).

== Issue ==
- Frederick William Kettler, Duke of Courland (19 July 1692 – 21 January 1711).
- Leopold Charles Kettler (14 December 1693 – 21 July 1697).

== Ancestry ==
Ancestors of Princess Elisabeth Sophie of Brandenburg

8. John Sigismund, Elector of Brandenburg
4. George William, Elector of Brandenburg
9. Duchess Anna of Prussia
2. Frederick William I, Elector of Brandenburg
10. Frederick IV, Elector Palatine
5. Elizabeth Charlotte of the Palatinate
11. Countess Louise Juliana of Nassau
1. Margravine Elisabeth Sophie of Brandenburg
12. John II, Duke of Schleswig-Holstein-Sonderburg
6. Philip, Duke of Schleswig-Holstein-Sonderburg-Glücksburg
13. Elisabeth of Brunswick-Grubenhagen
3. Sophia Dorothea of Schleswig-Holstein-Sonderburg-Glücksburg
14. Francis II, Duke of Saxe-Lauenburg
7. Sophia Hedwig of Saxe-Lauenburg
15. Maria of Brunswick-Lüneburg

== See also ==
- Bibliography of Russian history (1613–1917)

Princess Elisabeth Sophie of Brandenburg House of Hohenzollern Cadet branch of the House of Wettin Born: 5 April 1674 Died: 22 November 1748
Royal titles
Vacant Title last held by Sophie Amalie of Nassau-Siegen	Duchess consort of Courland; 29 April 1691 – 22 January 1698	Vacant Title next held by Anna Ivanovna of Russia
Vacant Title last held by Sophie Louise of Württemberg	Margravine consort of Brandenburg-Bayreuth; 30 March 1703 – 20 May 1712	Succeeded by Sophie of Saxe-Weissenfels
Vacant Title last held by Dorothea Marie of Saxe-Gotha-Altenburg	Duchess consort of Saxe-Meiningen; 3 June 1714 – 24 November 1724	Vacant Title next held by Charlotte Amalie of Hesse-Philippsthal
