= Ketteler =

Noble lineage

Ketteler Kettler
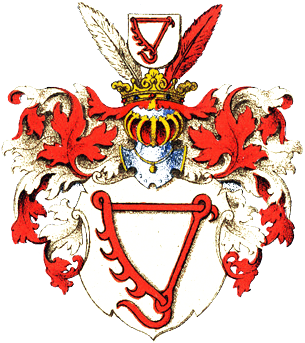
- Country: Germany, Latvia, Westphalia, Prussia, Poland-Lithuania
- Founded: 15th century
- Founder: Gotthard Kettler (Polish branch)
- Final ruler: Ferdinand Kettler
- Titles: Duke of Courland and Semigallia Master of the Livonian Order; Grand Master of the Teutonic Order; Knight Komtur of Dünaburg
- Deposition: 18th century
- Cadet branches: German branch Polish branch

The House of Ketteler (also Kettler) is an old and distinguished Baltic German noble family that originated in Westphalia.

== Origin ==
The family appeared in 1233 when Conrad von Hüsten was mentioned in the written documents as the Châtelain of Haus Hüsten. His descendant Conrad III von Hüsten genannt Ketteler (1285–1364) was a Knight and Châtelain of Rüthen. Goswin Ketteler zu Assen (c. 1400 – c. 1471) divided the property with his younger brother Röttger around 1440. He built a new house on his part of the ground and called himself since then Kettler Neu Assen. He changed the background of his coat of arms from silver to gold – the so-called golden line. The silver line still spells Ketteler and is called the silver line Ketteler Alt Assen.

== History ==
The Polish branch of the family rose to prominence during the Livonian War when Gotthard Kettler, the master of the Teutonic Order, created and inherited the Duchy of Courland and Semigallia from the Treaty of Vilnius (1561) as a vassal of the Grand Duchy of Lithuania from 1561 to 1569. It later became a vassal of the Polish-Lithuanian Commonwealth from 1569 to 1726, and it was incorporated into the Polish-Lithuanian Commonwealth by Sejm in 1726.

== Reigning Dukes of Courland ==
The family tree of the Kettler family, ruling Dukes of Courland

His family ruled the duchy until 1737, and the family became Polonized and married other members of the Szlachta. The family became increasingly powerful and had a chance of becoming one of the biggest magnates when Frederick William, Duke of Courland married future Empress Anna of Russia. The family hoped that all their descendants would become emperors and that the duchy would become more powerful. Unfortunately, Frederick died soon after the wedding and this dream was crushed. Empress Anna never married again.

After Fredrick died, his uncle inherited the duchy, and when he died childless, his line became extinct. However, German branch of the family which is named Ketteler zu Harkotten still has descendants. When the reigning branch became extinct in Poland, Empress Anna's lover, Ernst Johann von Biron, became the new duke. He was succeeded by his son Peter von Biron, but he abdicated under pressure. During the Partitions of Poland, Catherine the Great succeeded the Biron family and merged the duchy with Russia. The duchy is now part of present-day Latvia.

== Notable members ==
- Gotthard Kettler (also Ketteler; 2 February 1517 – 17 May 1587) was the last Master of the Livonian Order and the first Duke of Courland and Semigallia.
- Ferdinand Kettler (1 November 1655 – 4 May 1737) was the last Duke of Courland and Semigallia from the Kettler family.
- Wilhelm Emmanuel Freiherr von Ketteler (25 December 1811 – 13 July 1877) was a German theologian and politician who served as Bishop of Mainz; his social teachings became influential during the papacy of Leo XIII and his encyclical Rerum novarum.
- Clemens August Freiherr von Ketteler (22 November 1853 – 20 June 1900) was a German career diplomat; he was killed during the Boxer Rebellion, an event which prompted the Eight-Nation Alliance to declare war on China.
