= Ernst Ludwig, Duke of Pomerania =

Ernst Ludwig
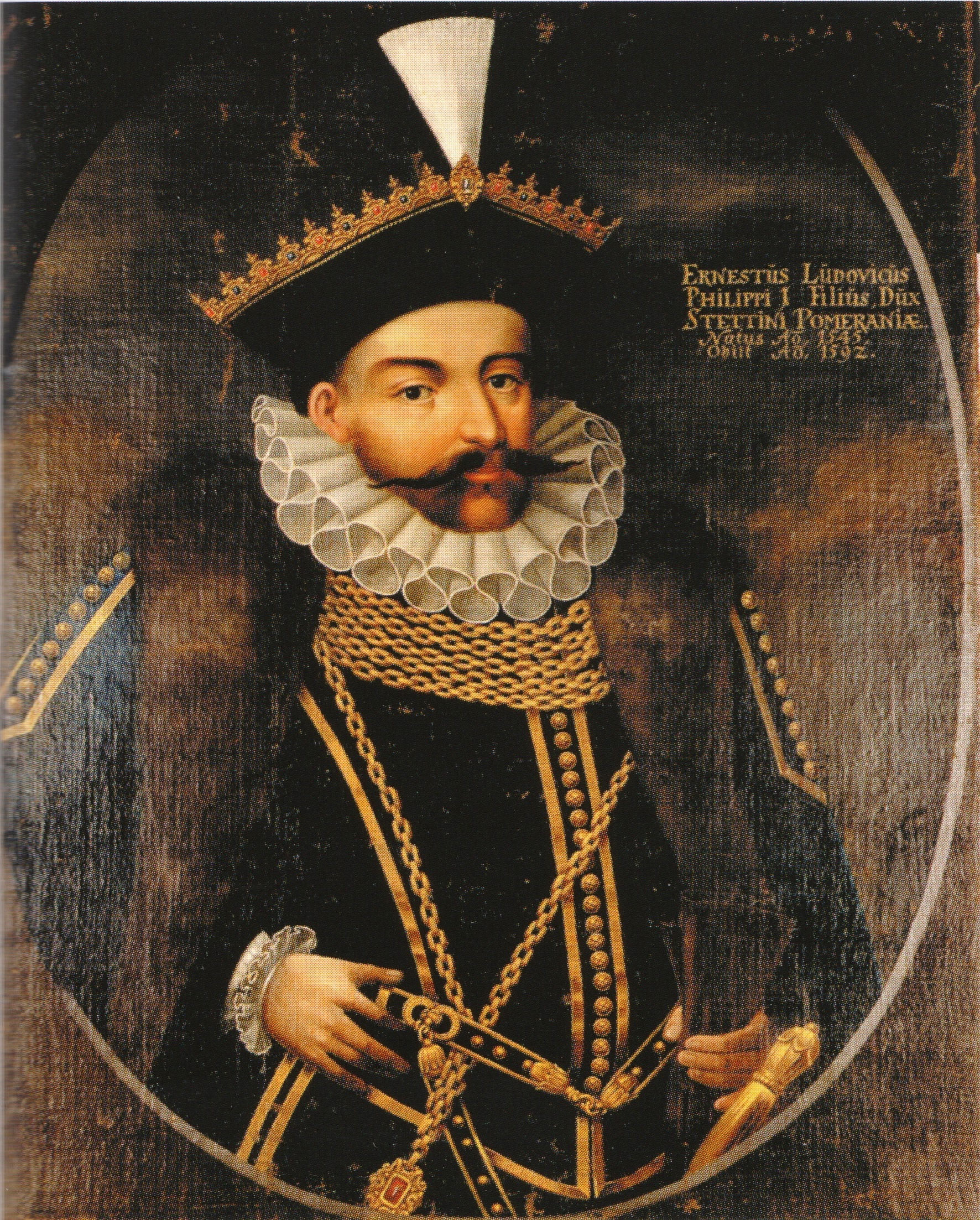
- Anonymous copy of a portrait, c. 1750

Duke of Pomerania-Wolgast
- Reign: 14 February 1560 – 17 June 1592
- Predecessor: Philip I
- Successor: Philipp Julius
- Born: 20 November 1545; Wolgast
- Died: 17 June 1592 (aged 46); Wolgast
- Spouse: Sophia Hedwig of Brunswick-Wolfenbüttel
Names
- German: Ernst Ludwig von Pommern; Polish: Ernest Ludwik wołogoski
- House: House of Griffin
- Father: Philip I, Duke of Pomerania
- Mother: Maria of Saxony

Ernst Ludwig (20 November 1545, in Wolgast – 17 June 1592, in Wolgast) was duke of Pomerania from 1560 to 1592. From 1569 to 1592, he was duke in the Teilherzogtum Pomerania-Wolgast, sharing the rule over the Duchy of Pomerania with his older brother Johann Friedrich, duke in the other Teilherzogtum Pomerania-Stettin and bishop of Cammin.

== Life ==
Ernst Ludwig was one of ten siblings born to Philipp I of Pomerania-Wolgast and Maria of Saxony. After the death of his father on 14 February 1560, all siblings were under the guardianship of their great-uncle, Barnim XI. With one of his brothers, Barnim XII, Ernst Ludwig studied at the University of Wittenberg from 1563 to 1565, where they resided in the house of Martin Luther. With another brother, Bogislaw XIII, he temporarily lived at the court of Johann Wilhelm, Duke of Saxe-Weimar.

In 1569, Barnim XI retired, and the duchy was internally partitioned among the male members of the House of Pomerania on 23 May in Jasenitz (now part of Police), which was approved by the Landtag in Wollin (now Wolin). Ernst Ludwig and his brother Bogislaw XIII received Pomerania-Wolgast, while his other brothers, Johann Friedrich and Barnim XII, received Pomerania-Stettin and Casimir IX the bishopric of Cammin. Because Bogislaw and Barnim immediately renounced their positions and were compensated with the domains of Barth and Neuenkamp and the domain of Rügenwalde, respectively, Ernst Ludwig got to rule his share alone.

On 20 October 1577, he married Sophia Hedwig, daughter of Julius of Brunswick-Lüneburg. With her, he had three children: Hedwig Maria, Elisabeth Magdalena of Pomerania, and Philipp Julius.

Ernst Ludwig developed the University of Greifswald, where he was personally involved in the rebuilding of the medical faculty. Ernst Ludwig also participated in the unsuccessful attempts of his brother, Johann Friedrich, to elevate the Duchy of Pomerania's military status in the Upper Saxon Circle.

In 1574, Ernst Ludwig built a residence in Pudagla on the ruins of the secularized Usedom Abbey. Two villages in the modern Vorpommern-Greifswald district carry his name: Near Wolgast, he founded Groß Ernsthof, and on the shore of the Bay of Greifswald he built the residence of Ludwigsburg in 1580, which he gave to his wife on 16 August 1586.

== Marriage and issue ==
Ernst Ludwig married in 1577 with Sophia Hedwig, daughter of the Duke Julius of Brunswick-Wolfenbüttel. Sophia Hedwig survived her husband almost four decades. She died in 1631 in Loitz and was buried, like her husband in the St. Peter's Church, in Wolgast.

The marriage produced two daughters and one son:

- Maria Hedwig (1579–1606)
- Elisabeth Magdalena (1580–1649), married Duke Friedrich Kettler of Courland and Zemgale
- Philip Julius (1584–1625), married Agnes, daughter of Elector John George of Brandenburg

== Death ==
Ernst Ludwig died on 17 July 1592. The University of Greifswald on the same day began with obsequies. His funeral was on 19 July in Wolgast. Legend tells that, foreshadowing the duke's death, a halo appeared in Stettin on 23 May that was followed by a rain of sulfur and blood. The widow, Sophia Hedwig, retired to Loitz, where she moved with the children from the Wolgast palace in 1594, and lived until her death on 30 January 1631. Initially, she was to retire to Ludwigsburg.

Ernst Ludwig was succeeded by his son, Philipp (II) Julius, who however remained under tutelage of Bogislaw XIII.

== In fiction ==
Wilhelm Meinhold in his 1848 novel Sidonia von Bork portrayed Ernst Ludwig as the cuckolded betrothed of Sidonia von Borcke, executed for witchcraft in 1620. Edward Burne-Jones, who illustrated the English translation of the novel, thus chose Ernst Ludwig's residence in Wolgast as the scene of his painting also captioned Sidonia von Bork. Theodor Fontane in his novel Sidonie von Borcke likewise writes about an affair and even an engagement of Ernst Ludwig and Sidonia von Borcke.

== See also ==
- Duchy of Pomerania
- List of Pomeranian duchies and dukes
- Partitions of the Duchy of Pomerania
- Pomerania during the Early Modern Age
- House of Pomerania

== Sources ==
=== Bibliography ===
- Helwig, Christoph; Thümmel, Hans Georg (2002). Thümmel, Hans Georg (ed.). Geschichte der Medizinischen Fakultät Greifswald: Geschichte der Medizinischen Fakultät von 1456 bis 1713 von Christoph Helwig D.J. und das Dekanatsbuch der Medizinischen Fakultät von 1714 bis 1823 (in German). Franz Steiner Verlag. ISBN 3-515-07908-4.
- Nicklas, Thomas (2002). Macht oder Recht: Frühneuzeitliche Politik im Obersächsischen Reichskreis (in German). Franz Steiner Verlag. ISBN 3-515-07939-4.
- Essegern, Ute (2007). Fürstinnen am kursächsischen Hof: Lebenskonzepte und Lebensläufe zwischen Familie, Hof und Politik in der ersten Hälfte des 17. Jahrhunderts; Hedwig von Dänemark, Sibylla Elisabeth von Württemberg und Magdalena Sibylla von Preussen (in German). Leipziger Universitätsverlag. ISBN 978-3-86583-074-6.
- Schattkowsky, Martina (2003). Witwenschaft in der frühen Neuzeit: Fürstliche und adlige Witwen zwischen Fremd- und Selbstbestimmung (in German). Leipziger Universitätsverlag. ISBN 3-936522-79-0.
- Branig, Hans; Buchholz, Werner (1997). Geschichte Pommerns: Vom Werden des neuzeitlichen Staates bis zum Verlust der staatlichen Selbständigkeit, 1300-1648 (in German). Böhlau. ISBN 3-412-07189-7.
- Goetz, Rolf (2006). Usedom, Wollin, Festlandsküste (in German). ADAC Verlag. ISBN 3-89905-294-3.
- Siebmacher, Johann (1981). Die Wappen der deutschen Landesfürsten (in German) (2 ed.). Bauer&Raspe. ISBN 3-87947-002-2.
- von Borcke, Wulf-Dietrich (2002). Sidonia von Borcke: die Hexe aus dem Kloster Marienfliess, 1548-1620 (in German). Helms. ISBN 3-931185-45-1.
- Brüske, Wolfgang (1983). Untersuchungen zur Geschichte des Lutizenbundes: Deutsch-wendische Beziehungen des 10.-12. Jahrhunderts (in German) (2 ed.). Böhlau. ISBN 3-412-07583-3.
- Inachin, Kyra (2008). Die Geschichte Pommerns. Hinstorff Rostock. ISBN 978-3-356-01044-2.
- Alverman, Dirk; Spiess, Karl-Heinz; Werlich, Ralf-Gunnar (2006). Universität und Gesellschaft (in German) (2 ed.). Hinstorff. ISBN 3-356-01136-7.
- Kabus, Ronny (1984). Staatliche Lutherhalle Wittenberg: 100 Jahre reformationsgeschtliches Museum (in German). Wittenberg: Lutherhalle.
- Gryse, Nicolaus; Pettke, Sabine (1997). Historia von Lehre, Leben und Tod Joachim Slüters (in German). Schmidt-Römhild. ISBN 3-7950-3730-1.
- Mager, Inge (1986). Die Konkordienformel im Fürstentum Braunschweig-Wolfenbüttel: Entstehungsbeitrag, Rezeption, Geltung (in German). Vandenhoeck & Ruprecht. ISBN 3-525-55238-6.
- Classen, Albrecht (2002). Mein Seel Fang an zu singen (in German). Peeters Publishers. ISBN 90-429-1098-4.
- Fischer, Hubertus (2005). Klosterfrauen, Klosterhexen: Theodor Fontanes Sidonie von Borcke im kulturellen Kontext (in German). Rübenberger Verlag Tania Weiss. ISBN 3-936788-07-3.
- Hildisch, Johannes (1980). Die Münzen der pommerschen Herzöge von 1569 bis zum Erlöschen des Greifengeschlechtes. Böhlau. ISBN 3-412-04679-5.

Ernest Louis of Pomerania House of Pomerania Born: 20 November 1545 Died: 17 June 1592
Preceded by Philip I	Dukes of Pomerania-Wolgast altogether under tutelage until 1567; 1560–1592 with his brothers Bogislaw XIII (1560–1569); John Frederick (1560–1569); Barnim X (1560–1569)	Succeeded by Philip Julius
