= Sophia Hedwig of Brunswick-Wolfenbüttel (1561–1631) =

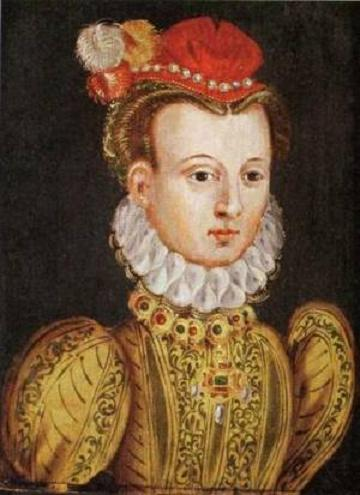
- Sophia Hedwig of Brunswick-Wolfenbüttel (1561–1631), Duchess of Pomerania-Wolgast
- Born: 1 December 1561; Hessen Castle
- Died: 30 January 1631 (aged 69); Loitz
- Buried: St. Peter's Church in Wolgast
- Noble family: House of Guelph
- Spouse: Ernst Ludwig, Duke of Pomerania
- Issue: Maria Hedwig; Elisabeth Magdalena; Philip Julius
- Father: Julius, Duke of Brunswick-Wolfenbüttel
- Mother: Hedwig of Brandenburg

Sophie or Sophia Hedwig of Brunswick-Wolfenbüttel (1 December 1561 at Hessen Castle – 30 January 1631 in Loitz) was a princess of Brunswick-Wolfenbüttel by birth and by marriage a Duchess of Pomerania-Wolgast.

== Life ==
Sophia Hedwig was the eldest child of the Duke Julius of Brunswick-Wolfenbüttel (1528–1589) from his marriage to Hedwig (1540–1602), the daughter of Elector Joachim II of Brandenburg. Her parents provided her with a comprehensive and thorough education and started marriage negotiations when she was young.

She married as a 16-year-old on 20 October 1577 in Wolgast to Duke Ernst Ludwig of Pommern-Wolgast (1545–1592). Her father sent Lutheran theologicians to the court at Wolgast, who tried to move the court to accept the Formula of Concord as the authoritative formulation of the Lutheran creed. The court did not accept this formula. Ernst Ludwig ordered structural changes to Wolgast Castle, replacing the medieval northeast wing by a new residential wing. Like her mother, Sophia Hedwig was described as high spirited. She took care of the poor and the needy and was not deterred by a plague epidemic.

Ernst Ludwig died in 1592, after 15 years of marriage. In addition to her jointure, the castle and district of Loitz, he left her Ludwigsburg estate near Greifswald, which he had already given to her in 1586, and the Jamitsow estate at the Peenestrom. She soon swapped the latter for the Zerpenzyn estate, opposite the city of Loitz. She change the name Zerpenzyn to Sophienhof ("Sophie's Court") in 1594. Her children moved with her to her widow seat at Loitz. She wrote a hymn to commemorate her husband's death. It was published by Ambrosius Lobwasser. Between 1597 and 1601, she accompanied her son, who was introduced into the business of government by his guardian and regent Duke Bogislaw XIII.

During her husband's lifetime, Sophia Hedwig had rebuilt the castle at Loitz as a renaissance château. After his death, she embellished it further. She also remodeled and extended the St. Mary's Church in Loitz. The château has since been demolished and no trace of it remains. Some of her contributions to the church, however, are still there, among them the ducal seats, a double portrait of herself and her husband, and numerous coats of arms of their ancestors.

Her husband also gave her an estate in Dersin near Loissin, where she built a castle named Schloss Ludwigsburg, after her husband. Loitz and Ludwigsburg remained her dowager residences until her death.

When the inventory of her court was taken in 1593, an Amtshauptmann was present, as were a treasurer, a comptroller, a Hofmeister, a governess, a lady-in-waiting and several chamber staff, kitchen staff, cellar staff and stable hands.

Sophia Hedwig was described as interested in economic processes, but also as wasteful and overbearing. She is considered one of the more influential duchesses in Pomerania. Her son survived her by nearly six years,dying in 1625, from the effects of "unhealthy living".

The war delayed her funeral by almost two years. She was buried in the ducal crypt in the St. Peter's Church in Wolgast. Her tomb was restored a few years ago, as were the tombs of her son, her husband and her in-laws.

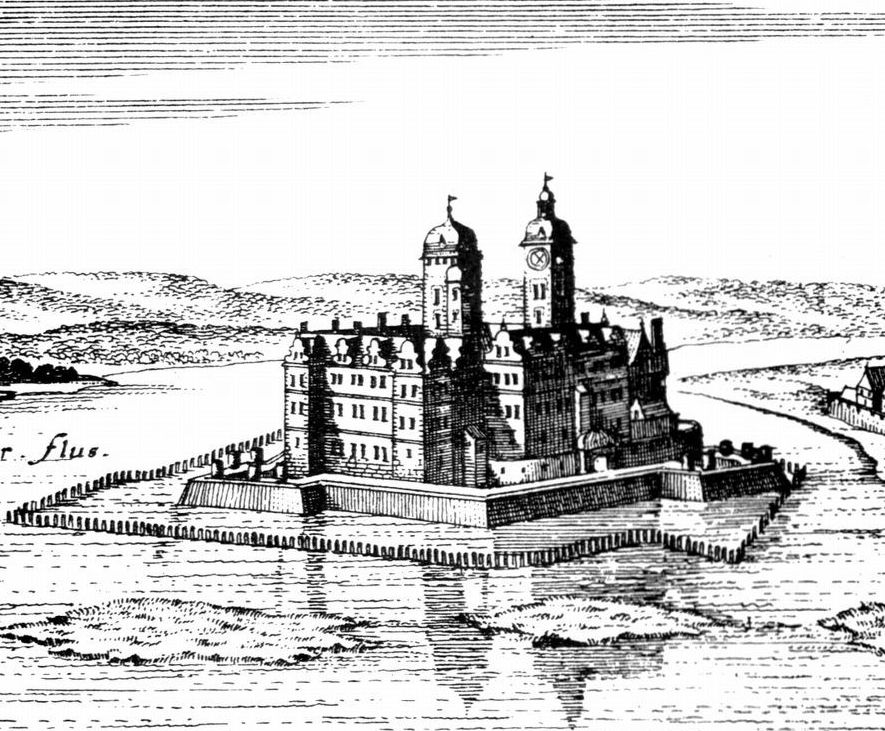
Wolgast Castle

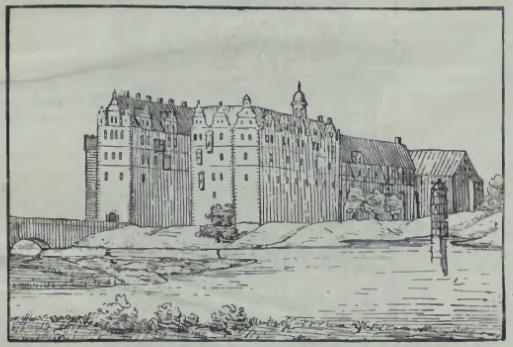
Loitz Castle

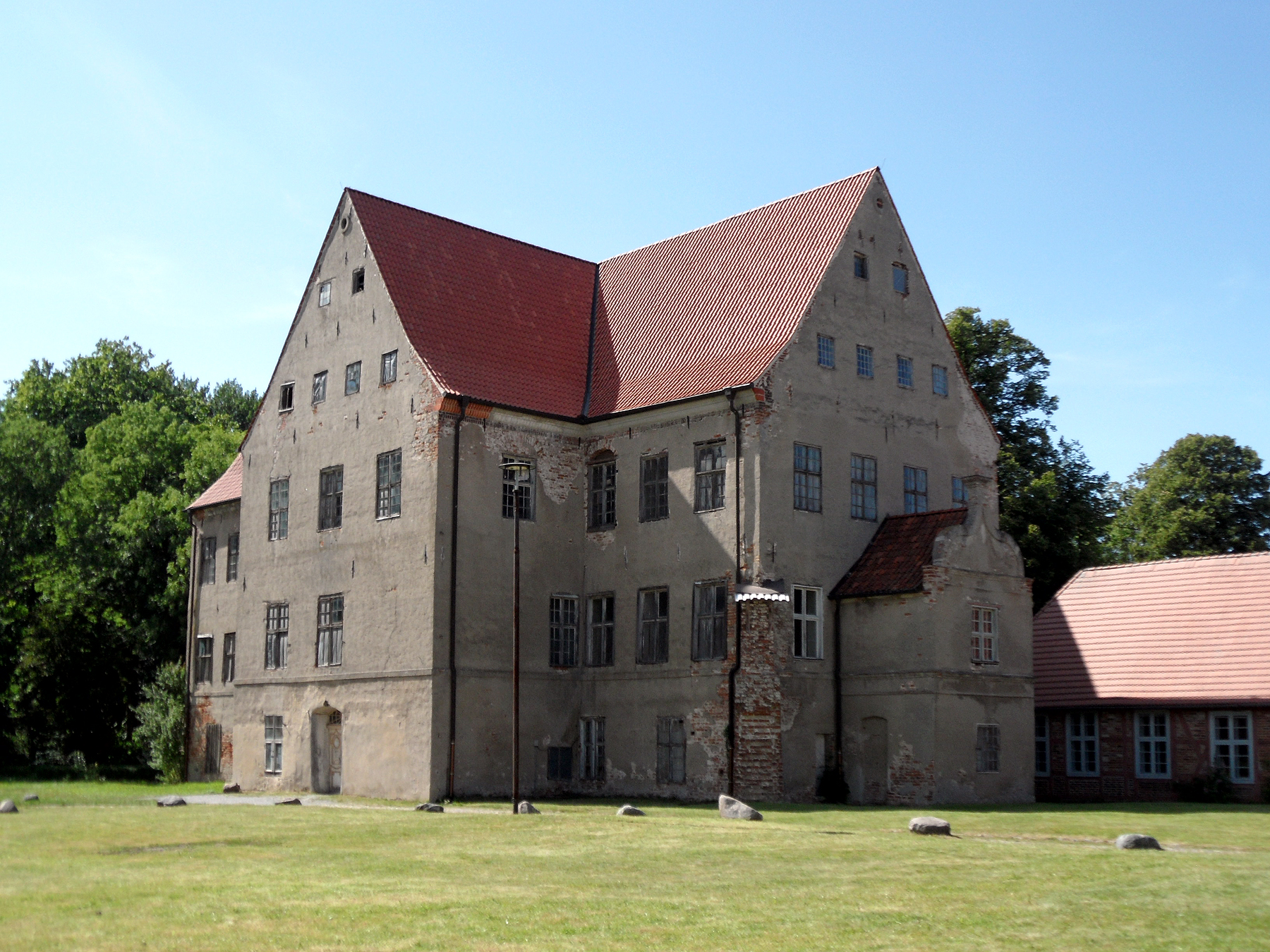
Ludwigsburg Castle

== Issue ==
From her marriage, Sophia Hedwig had three children:

- Hedwig Maria (1579–1606)

was engaged to Duke John Adolph of Holstein. However, she died before it came to a marriage.

- Elisabeth Magdalena (1580–1649)

married in 1600 Friedrich Kettler, Duke of Courland and Zemgale (1569–1642)

- Philip Julius (1584–1625), Duke of Pomerania-Wolgast

married in 1604 to Princess Agnes of Brandenburg (1584–1629)
