= Elisabeth Magdalena of Pomerania =

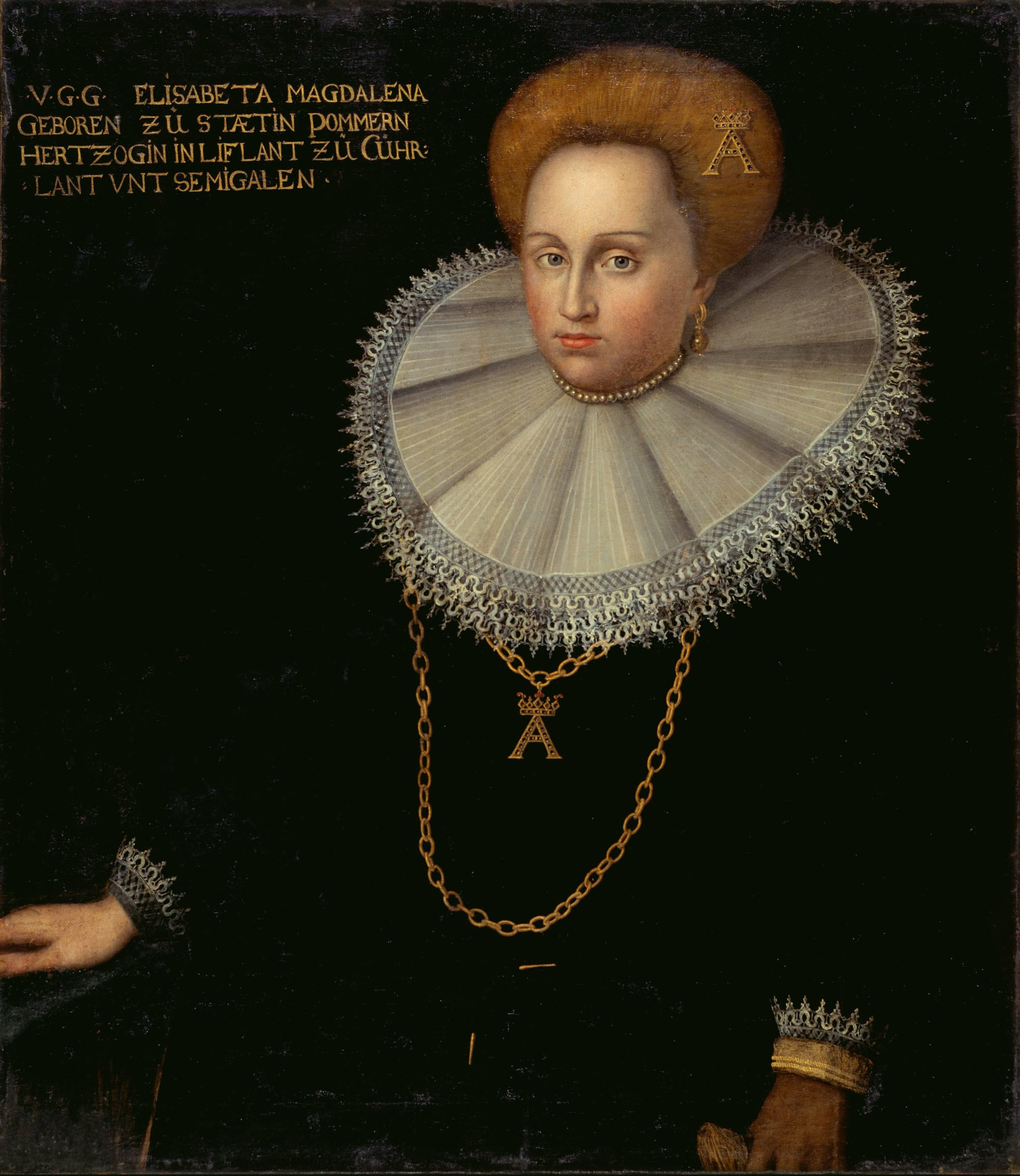
- Portrait, late 16th/early 17th century
- Born: 14 June 1580; Wolgast, Duchy of Pomerania
- Died: 23 February 1649 (aged 68); Doblen, Duchy of Courland and Semigallia
- Noble family: Griffins
- Spouse: Duke Friedrich Kettler of Courland
- Father: Ernst Ludwig, Duke of Pomerania
- Mother: Sophia Hedwig of Brunswick-Wolfenbüttel

Elisabeth Magdalena of Pomerania (14 June 1580 – 23 February 1649), was a Duchess consort of Courland by marriage to Friedrich Kettler.

Elisabeth Magdalena was the daughter of Ernst Ludwig, Duke of Pomerania and of Princess Sophie Hedwig of Brunswick-Wolfenbüttel. She married the Duke of Courland, Friedrich Kettler, on 14 March 1600.

She participated in the politics of the Duchy as the adviser to her spouse during the difficult times when Courland was at war with Sweden and Poland and when there was unrest among the nobility in Courland against the ducal reign. In 1616, her brother-in-law was deposed by the local nobility, and her husband was elected sole ruler of Courland the following year. Elisabeth Magdalena actively participated in this affair. She negotiated with her German relatives to have her brother-in-law rehabilitated, and in 1619, she visited the Sejm in Warsaw to that effect. During the war with Sweden, she became known for her charity, and protected schools and hospitals.

She was childless, and became the foster mother of her brother-in-law's son Jacob Kettler. She actively worked for Jacob to be appointed the successor and heir to the Duchy, an effort which proved to be successful when he succeeded her spouse in 1642. As a widow, she settled at Dobele Castle, where she died.

Elisabeth Magdalena of Pomerania House of Griffins Born: 14 June 1580 Died: 23 February 1649
Preceded by Anna of Mecklenburg	Duchess consort of Courland; 1600–1642	Succeeded by Sophia of Prussia
