= Duchess Sophie of Prussia =

Duchess consort of Courland (1582-1610)

Duchess Sophie
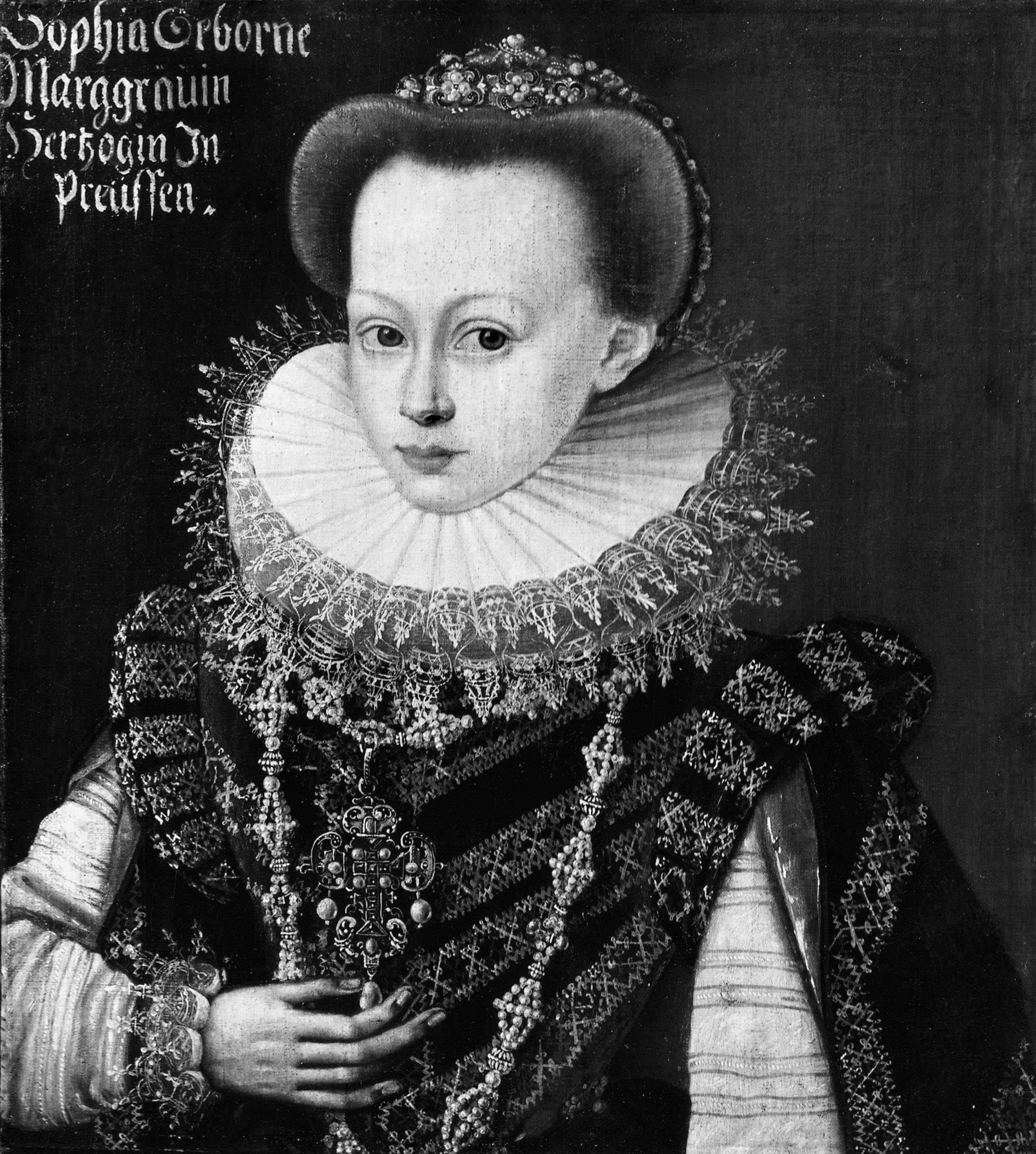

Duchess consort of Courland and Semigallia
- Tenure: 22 October 1609 - 4 December 1610
- Born: 31 March 1582; Königsberg, Duchy of Prussia
- Died: 24 November 1610 (aged 28); Goldingen, Duchy of Courland and Semigallia
- Spouse: Wilhelm Kettler (m. 1609)
- Issue: Jacob Kettler
- House: Hohenzollern (by birth); Kettler (by marriage)
- Father: Albert Frederick, Duke of Prussia
- Mother: Marie Eleonore of Cleves

Duchess Sophie of Prussia (c. 31 March 1582 – c. 24 November 1610) was a German princess of the Duchy of Prussia, a fief of Kingdom of Poland and a member of the House of Hohenzollern.

Sophie was the daughter of Albert Frederick, Duke of Prussia, and Marie Eleonore of Cleves. She was courted by Wilhelm Kettler, son of Gotthard Kettler of Courland and Anna of Mecklenburg-Schwerin. Their marriage contract was signed in Königsberg on 5 January 1609. Sophie died on 24 November 1610, four weeks after the birth of her only son, Jacob, who later succeeded his paternal uncle Friedrich Kettler as Duke of Courland.

Duchess Sophie of Prussia House of Hohenzollern Born: 31 March 1582 Died: 4 December 1610
| Preceded by Elisabeth Magdalena of Pomerania | Duchess consort of Courland; 1609–1610 | Succeeded by Margravine Louise Charlotte of Brandenburg |
