= Frederick Kettler =

Frederick Kettler may refer to:

- Friedrich Kettler (1569–1642), Duke of Courland and Semigallia, 1587–1642
- Frederick Casimir Kettler (1650–1698), Duke of Courland and Semigallia, 1682–1698
