= Sophie Hedwig of Brunswick-Wolfenbüttel =

Sophie Hedwig of Brunswick-Wolfenbüttel may refer to:

- Sophie Hedwig of Brunswick-Wolfenbüttel (1592–1642)
- Sophia Hedwig of Brunswick-Wolfenbüttel (1561–1631)
