= Wilhelm Kettler =

- Duke of Courland and Semigallia
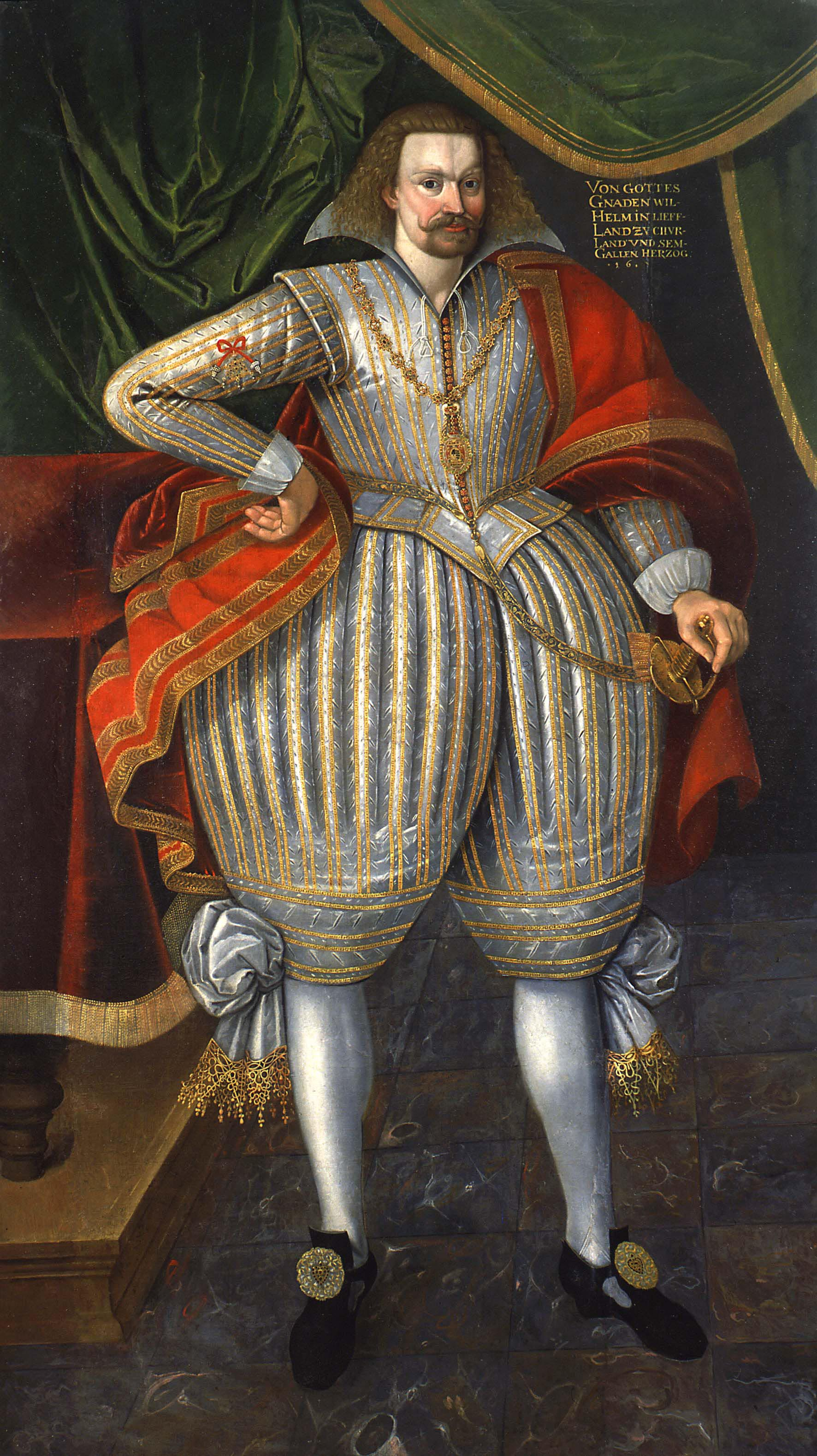
- Portrait, 1615

Duke of Courland
- Reign: 1587–1617
- Predecessor: Gotthard Kettler
- Successor: Friedrich Kettler
- Born: 20 June 1574; Mitau, Duchy of Courland and Semigallia
- Died: 7 April 1640 (aged 65); Kucklow, Duchy of Pomerania
- Burial: Ducal crypt in the Jelgava Palace
- Spouse: Duchess Sophie of Prussia (m. 1609; died 1610)
- Issue: Jacob, Duke of Courland
- House: Kettler
- Father: Gotthard Kettler
- Mother: Anna of Mecklenburg
- Religion: Lutheranism

Wilhelm Kettler (20 June 1574 – 7 April 1640) was the Duke of Courland, a Baltic German region in today's Latvia. He ruled the western Courland portion of the Duchy of Courland and Semigallia, while his brother Friedrich ruled the eastern Semigallia portion.

== Life and family ==
Born in Mitau in 1574, Wilhelm Kettler was the youngest son of Gotthard Kettler and his wife, Anna of Mecklenburg. After their father's death in 1587, Friedrich inherited the title of Duke of Courland and Semigallia, but economic control was split between Wilhelm and Friedrich. The brothers divided the duchy between themselves, and Wilhelm ruled the Courland portion, with the seat in Kuldīga. From 1590 Wilhelm studied in University of Rostock.

In 1609, William married Princess Sophia of Brandenburg-Prussia, daughter of Albert Frederick, Duke of Prussia, receiving as a dowry the territory of Grobiņa.

In 1613 Wilhelm hosted Duke of Pomerania Philip Julius in his castle at Kuldīga. In 1615 Wilhelm ordered two of his most strongest opponents, the brothers Magnuss and Gothard von Nolde, to be killed. This caused outrage among nobility. As a result in 1617, a Regional assembly (Landtag) was summoned in Skrunda Castle. Wilhelm Kettler was stripped of his title and banished from the duchy.

Wilhelm Kettler emigrated in 1617. Thereafter, his brother Friedrich became the sole ruler of the duchy.

Wilhelm traveled to Pomerania where he swore allegiance to King of Sweden Gustav II Adolph. He died in the Kucklow abbey in Pomerania on 7 April 1640. His son, Jacob Kettler, succeeded Friedrich as Duke of Courland and Semigallia in 1642.

Wilhelm's remains were returned to Courland in 1642, and he was interred in the ducal tomb on 23 February 1643.
