= Ambrosius Lobwasser =

German humanist and translator

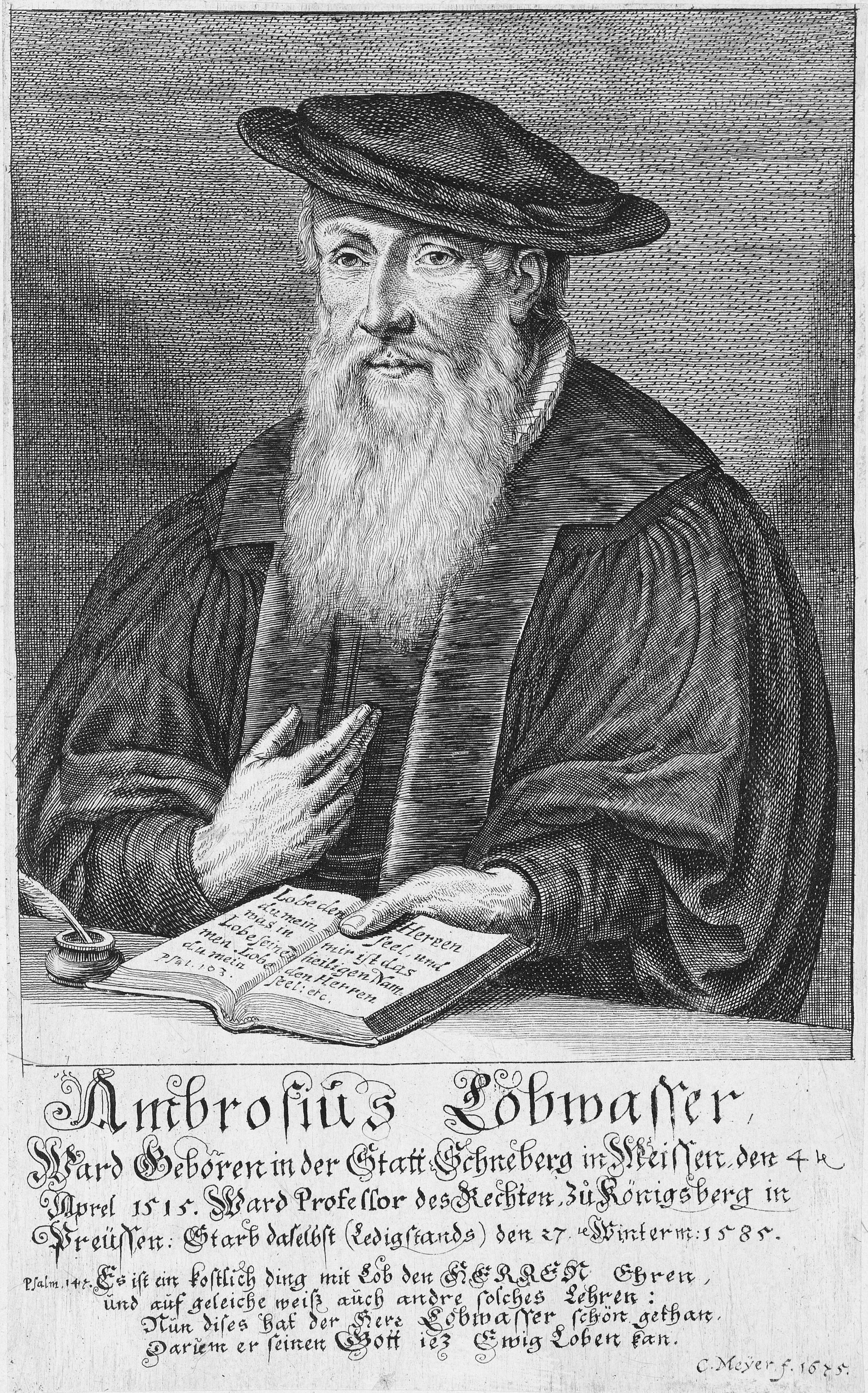
Ambrosius Lobwasser

Ambrosius Lobwasser (1515–1585) was a German humanist and translator, born in Saxony. He served as professor of jurisprudence at the University of Königsberg from 1563 until his retirement in 1580, but is best known for his Psalter des Königlichen Propheten David, published in 1573 (Leipzig). This metrical psalter, a translation of the Genevan Psalter, became one of the standard psalm-books used by the evangelical churches of the German-speaking lands, including Switzerland (the Genevan Psalter had been written in French). The Lobwasser psalter was widely reprinted into the 1800s.

Psalmbooks and hymnbooks descended from the Lobwasser psalter continue in use today in the worldwide communities of faith descended from Anabaptism, including many branches of the Amish and Mennonite faiths of the US and Canada. Lobwasser also published contemporary hymns, including a sacred song composed by the evangelical Princess Sophie Hedwig of Brunswick-Wolfenbüttel.
