= Jacob Kettler =

Duke of Courland and Semigallia from 1642 to 1682

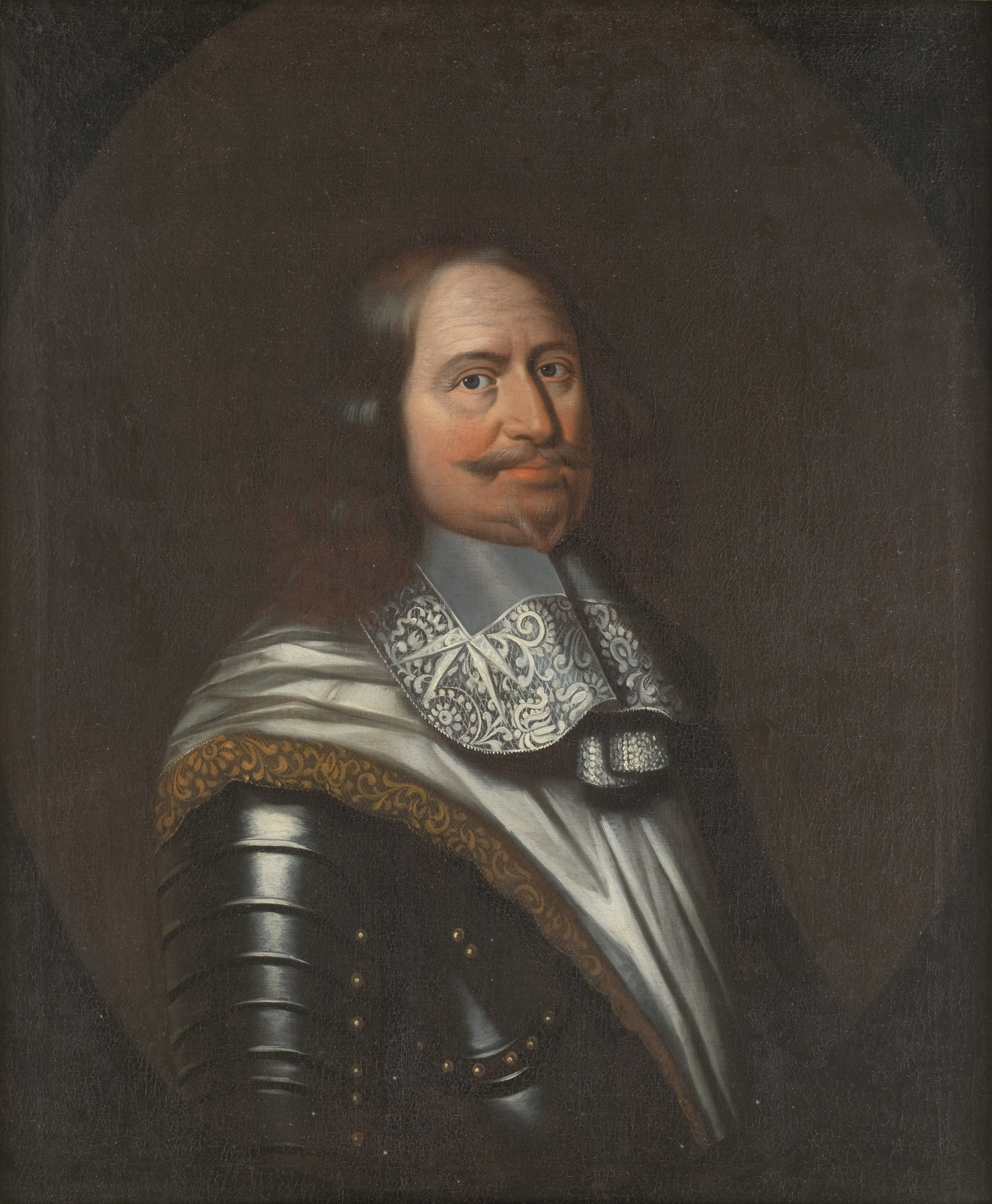
- Portrait of Jacob Kettler, from the Stockholm National Museum

Duke of Courland and Semigallia
- Reign: 17 August 1642 – 1 January 1682
- Predecessor: Frederick Kettler
- Successor: Frederick Casimir Kettler
- Born: 28 October 1610; Goldingen (Kuldīga)
- Died: 1 January 1682 (aged 71); Mitau (Jelgava)
- Burial: Ducal crypt in the Jelgava Palace
- Spouse: Margravine Louise Charlotte of Brandenburg (m. 1645; died 1676)
- Issue: Louise Elisabeth, Landgravine of Hesse-Homburg; Frederick Casimir Kettler, Duke of Courland; Charlotte Sophia, Abbess of Herford; Maria Amalia, Landgravine of Hesse-Kassel; Charles Jacob Kettler; Ferdinand Kettler; Alexander Kettler
- House: Kettler
- Father: Wilhelm Kettler
- Mother: Duchess Sophie of Prussia
- Religion: Lutheranism

Jacob Kettler (German: Jakob von Kettler; Latvian: Hercogs Jēkabs Ketlers; 28 October 1610 – 1 January 1682) was Duke of Courland and Semigallia from 1642 to 1682. Under his rule, Courland and Semigallia became more independent of its Polish suzerain, reached its peak in wealth, and even engaged in its own overseas colonization, making it one of the smallest, but fastest growing states in the world at that time.

Yet, in the end the results of his rule failed in the confrontation with much stronger powers both directly in the Baltic (Sweden) and overseas (Dutch Republic). A ruler "too rich and powerful to be a duke but too small and poor to be a king" could not, with his small ancestral territory and very limited resources, play the powerful role he sought in European politics of that time.

== Early life ==
Kettler was born in Kuldīga (Goldingen). He was the son of Wilhelm Kettler and Duchess Sophie of Prussia, a daughter of Albert Frederick, Duke of Prussia, and was a godson of King James I of England. While his father was exiled from the duchy, Jacob lived in the courts of Stettin and Berlin. He studied in Rostock and at the University of Leipzig and sympathized with the ideas of mercantilism.

In 1633, he led a Curonian regiment in the Smolensk War between the Polish–Lithuanian Commonwealth and Russia. In 1634, he made a grand tour of Europe, visiting Paris, London, and Amsterdam, where he studied shipbuilding. In 1638, he became the co-ruler of the duchy, and in 1642, the sole duke of Courland.

== Reign ==
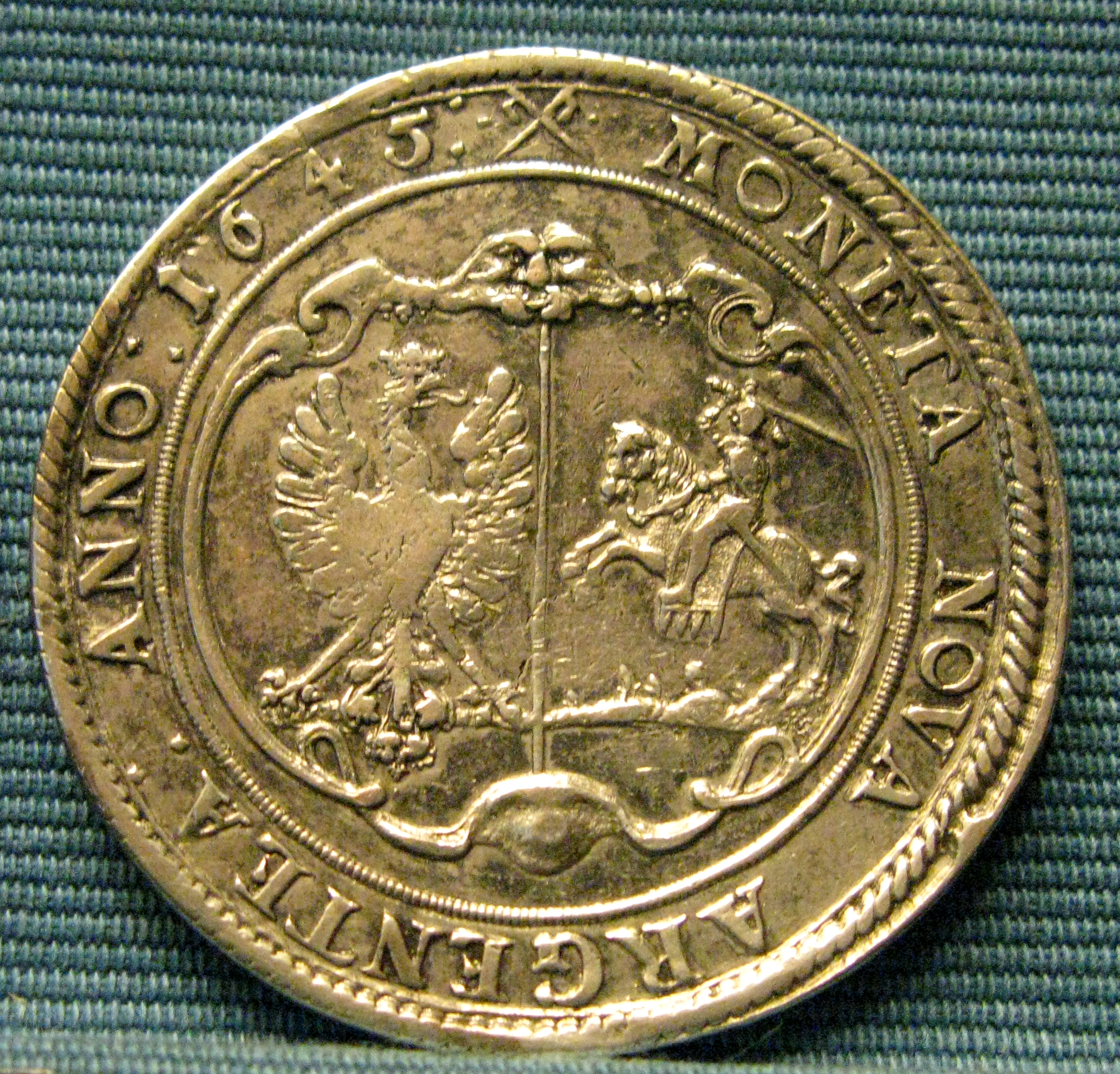
Jacob Kettler's thaler, 1645

Under Kettler's rule, the duchy traded with the Netherlands, Portugal, England, France, and other nations. He started large scale reforms of the duchy's economy, improved its agriculture, opened many manufactures and started a shipbuilding industry. He founded the Fleet of Courland and Semigalla, a navy and merchant fleet. During his reign, the duchy became de facto independent of the Polish crown, because all contracts with foreign powers were signed as between independent states. After 1646, all customs administration of the duchy also was in the duke's power.

The duchy was involved in colonisation. In 1651 Jacob sent a fleet to build Fort Jacob on the Gambia River, on an island that would later be known as Kunta Kinteh Island. In 1654, he conquered Tobago with forces from the Das Wappen der Herzogin von Kurland, a double-decker ship armed with 45 cannons, carrying 25 officers, 124 Courlander soldiers, and eighty families of Latvian colonists. The colony on Tobago was named Neu Kurland ('New Courland' in German). In 1654, Duke Jacob was a party to the Treaty of Westminster.

In 1651, the duke contacted Pope Innocent X with an offer of 40 Men-of-wars and 24,000 soldiers and sailors to conquer land in Australia. Courland would receive the commercial profits of the venture, while the Pope would provide the necessary monetary backing and receive the spiritual dividends from the missionary line. The plan was dropped in 1655 with Pope Innocent X's death.

== Imprisonment ==
The duke was taken prisoner by the Swedes from 1658 to 1660, during the Second Northern War after the Invasion of Courland. Together with his family, he was held captive in Riga and later in Ivangorod. During this time, his colonies were attacked and lost and his fleet destroyed. After the war ended, he rebuilt the duchy's fleet and retook the island of Tobago from the Dutch. For the rest of his reign he tried to reach a pre-war level of wealth but managed to do this only partly.

The duke died in Mitau (Jelgava) on 1 January 1682.

== Legacy ==
Kettler is remembered as a fair ruler who gave opportunities to the local Latvian peasants and even knew the Latvian language.

== Marriage and issue ==
Kettler married Princess Louise Charlotte of Brandenburg (1617–1676), the daughter of George William, Elector of Brandenburg and had issue:

Name	Birth	Death	Notes
Louise Elisabeth Kettler	12 August 1646	16 December 1690	married Frederick II, Landgrave of Hesse-Homburg; had issue; died aged 44
Ladislaus Louis Frederick Kettler	14 December 1647	31 March 1648	died aged 3 months
Christina Sophia Kettler	15 May 1649	9 June 1651	died aged 2
Frederick II Casimir Kettler	6 July 1650	22 January 1698	married (1) Countess Sophie Amalie of Nassau-Siegen; had issue (2) Margravine Elisabeth Sophie of Brandenburg; had issue; died aged 48
Charlotte Sophia Kettler	17 September 1651	1 December 1728	never married; became the Abbess in Herford; died aged 76
Maria Amalia Kettler	12 June 1653	16 June 1711	married Charles I, Landgrave of Hesse-Kassel; had issue; died aged 58
Charles Jacob Kettler	20 October 1654	29 December 1677	never married; died aged 23
Ferdinand Kettler	2 November 1655	4 May 1737	married Princess Johanna Magdalene of Saxe-Weissenfels; no issue; died aged 81
Alexander Kettler	16 October 1658	28 June 1686	never married; died aged 27

== Ancestry ==
Ancestors of Jacob Kettler

8. Gotthard Kettler, Herr zu Neu-Assen-Melrich
4. Gotthard Kettler, Duke of Courland
9. Sophie of Nesselrode
2. Wilhelm Kettler, Duke of Courland
10. Albert VII, Duke of Mecklenburg
5. Duchess Anna of Mecklenburg-Schwerin
11. Margravine Anna of Brandenburg
1. Jacob Kettler, Duke of Courland
12. Albert, Duke of Prussia
6. Albert Frederick, Duke of Prussia
13. Duchess Anna Marie of Brunswick-Lüneburg
3. Duchess Sophie of Prussia
14. William, Duke of Jülich-Cleves-Berg
7. Duchess Marie Eleonore of Cleves
15. Archduchess Maria of Austria

Preceded by Friedrich Kettler	Duke of Courland; 1642–1682	Succeeded by Frederick Casimir Kettler
