= Agnes of Brandenburg, Duchess of Pomerania =

Duchess of Pomerania and Saxe-Lauenburg (1584–1629)

Agnes of Brandenburg
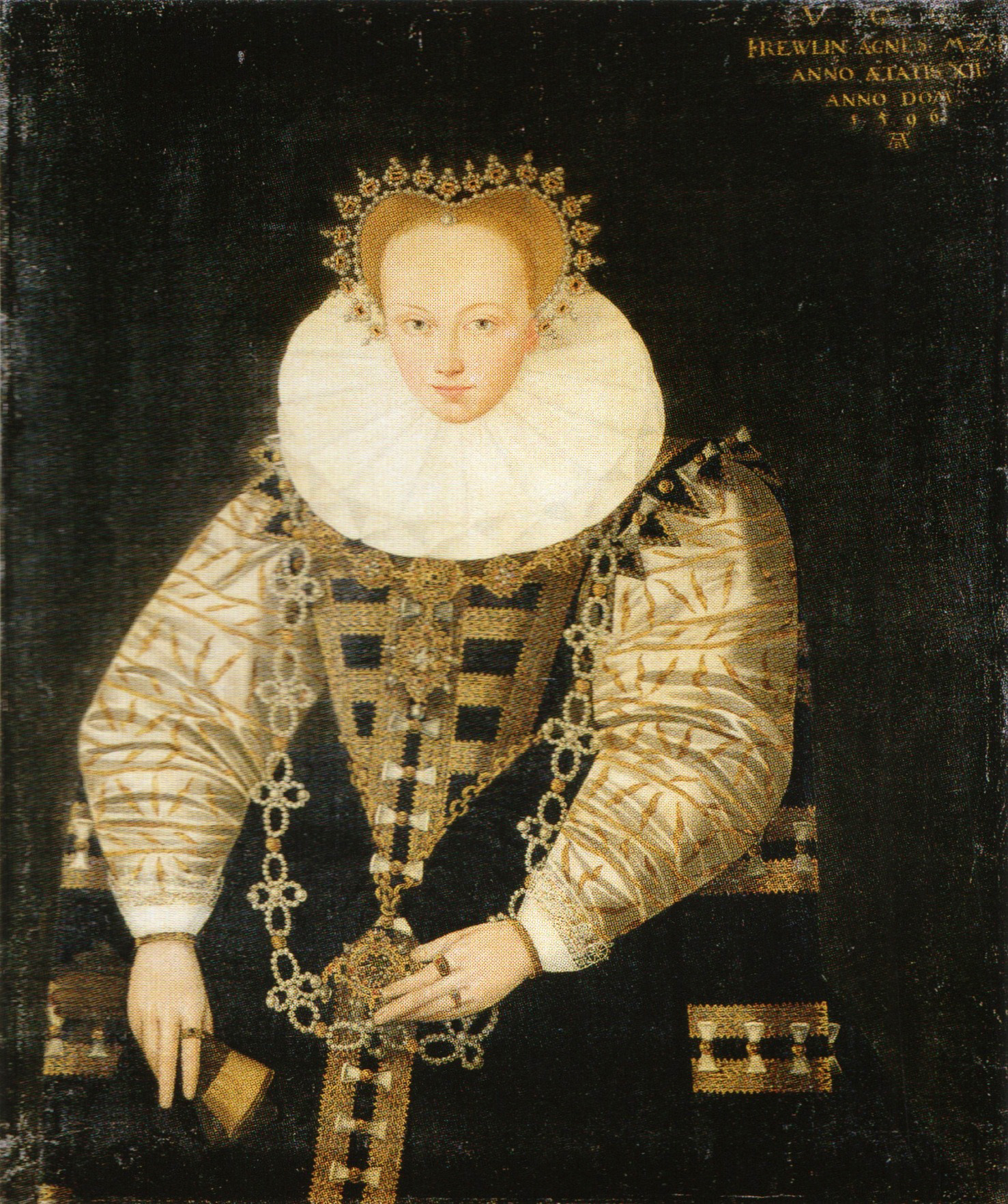
- Agnes in 1596
- Born: 17 July 1584; Berlin
- Died: 26 March 1629 (aged 44); Amt Neuhaus
- Spouse: Philipp Julius, Duke of Pomerania (m. 1604; died 1625) Francis Charles of Saxe-Lauenburg (m. 1639)
- House: Hohenzollern
- Father: John George, Elector of Brandenburg
- Mother: Elisabeth of Anhalt-Zerbst

Agnes of Brandenburg (17 July 1584 – 26 March 1629) was a princess of Brandenburg by birth and by marriage, successively duchess of Pomerania and of Saxe-Lauenburg.

== Life ==
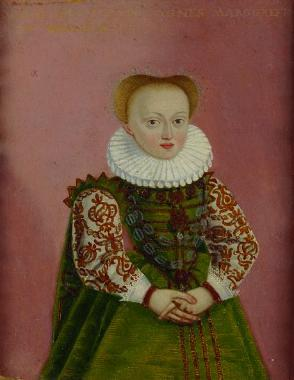
Agnes as a child in c. 1593 by a Brandenburg court miniaturist, the Royal Collection

Agnes, a member of the house of Hohenzollern, was a daughter of John George, Elector of Brandenburg from his third marriage to Elisabeth of Anhalt-Zerbst, daughter of Joachim Ernst of Anhalt.

Agnes had 23 siblings from her father's three marriages, but only 15 survived beyond childhood. Between her parents there was a 40-year age difference. Agnes' father died in 1598 when she was 14 years old.

After the death of her husband, Agnes' mother left the court in Berlin together with her children to live at Crossen Palace, where she gave birth to a posthumous son, John George.

Agnes lived intermittently at Crossen palace, with her sister Magdalena in Darmstadt, and Sophie in Dresden. Agnes' sister was married to Christian I of Saxony, and Agnes was educated alongside their daughters (and her nieces) Sophie and Auguste.

Agnes was taught to read and write in German, and received instruction in religion. Noted for her intelligence, she also became fluent in French and Latin while listening in on her brother's lessons. Agnes and her sisters were also instructed in dancing and singing, and would perform in court performances.

=== First marriage ===
On 25 June 1604 in Berlin, Agnes married her first husband, Philip Julius, Duke of Pomerania-Wolgast. Two of Agnes' older half-sisters were married to Philip Julius' uncles, Erdmuthe to John Frederick, Duke of Pomerania, and Anna Maria to Barnim X.

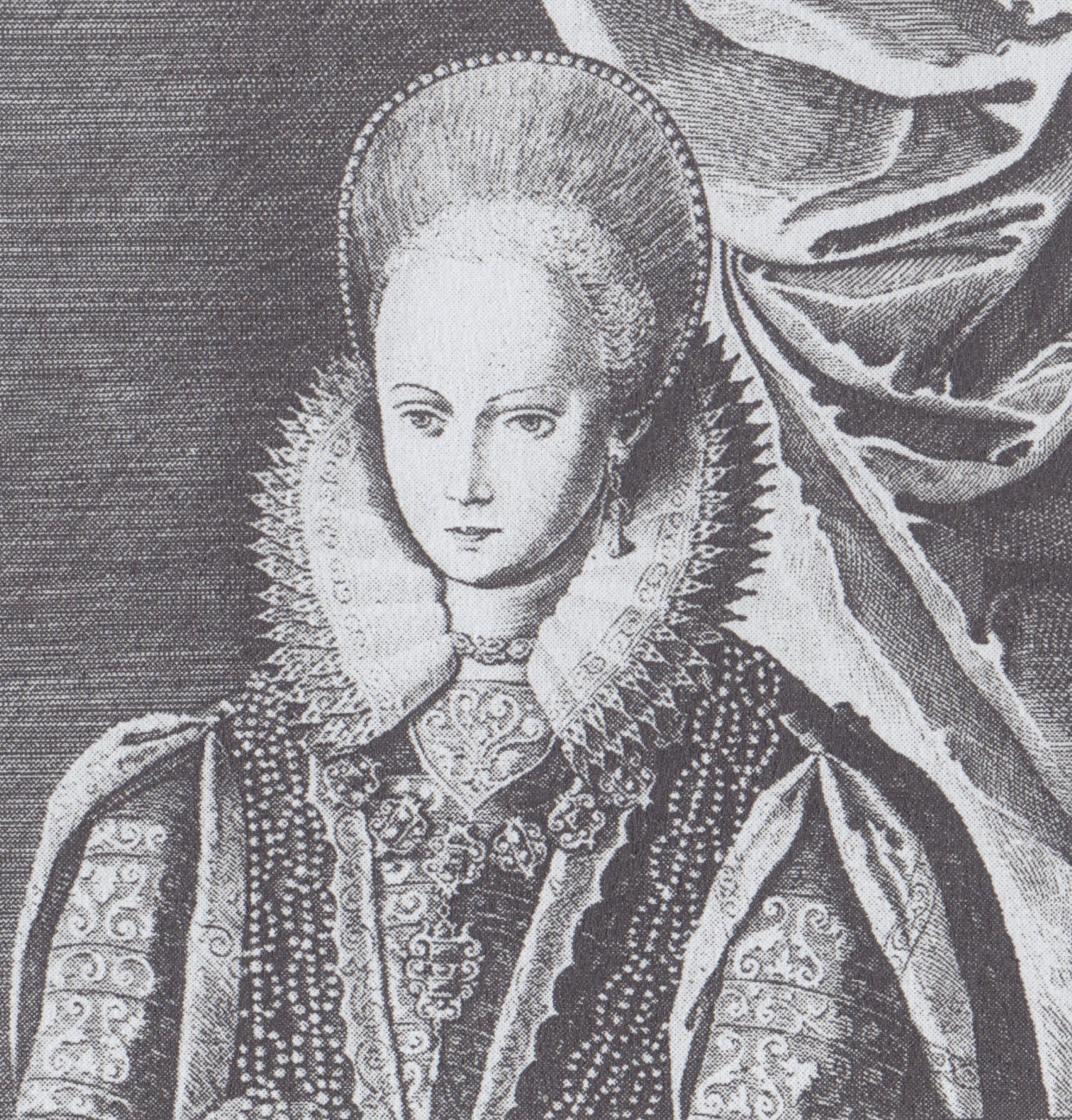
Engraving of Agnes of Brandenburg, 1605

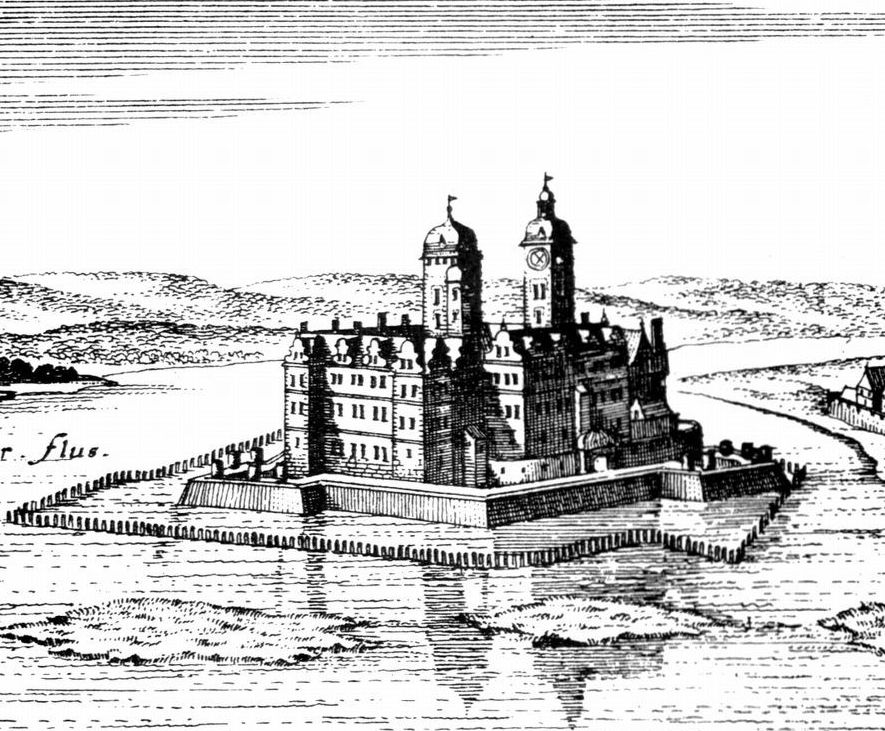
Wolgast castle (1652)

Philip Julius carried the epithet "the handsome" (German: der Schöne) because of his graceful facial features, beautiful figure and pleasant form. He also enjoyed a reputation as a well-read and eloquent man. His personality was, however, considered flighty, and his manner domineering and arbitrary.

The pair resided at Wolgast Castle, where Agnes and Philip Julius entertained a grand court and an entourage consisting not only of servants but also of musicians and actors, owing to Philip Julius' interest in the cultural arts. A folwark at Udars on the island of Rügen was named after Agnes: Agnisenhof or Agnetenhof.

In 1615, Elisabeth was involved, at the request of her husband, in the financing of a mint in Franzburg.

==== Widowhood ====
After Philip Julius' death on 6 February 1625, (which was blamed on unhealthy living and drunkneness) Agnes lived on her wittum, the district of Barth. Dubslaff Christoph von Eickstedt auf Rothenklempenow, who had been adviser to her husband, served as her privy counsellor and captain.

=== Second marriage ===
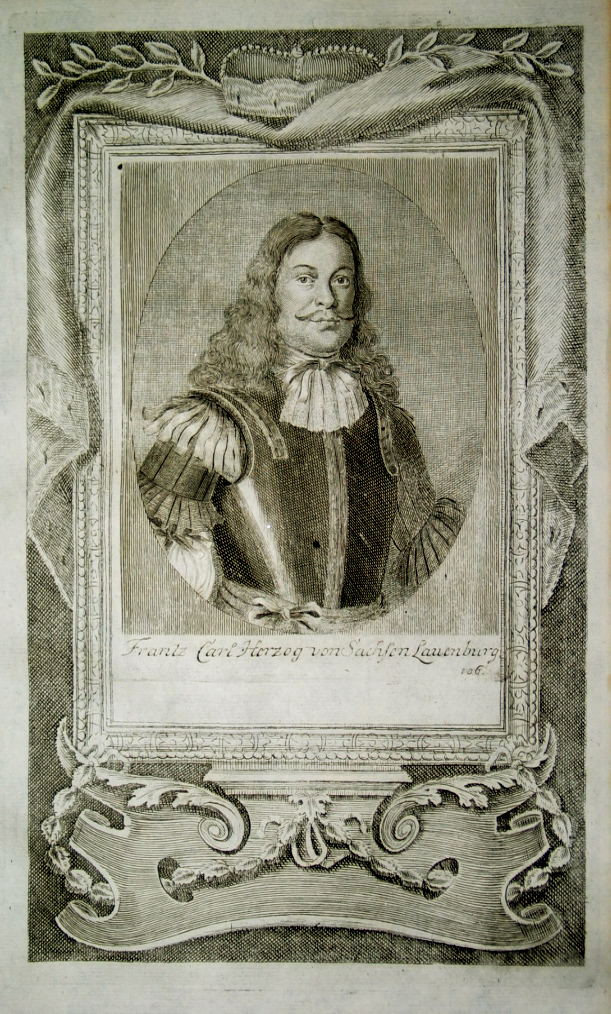
Francis Charles of Saxe-Lauenburg

Agnes was married again on 9 September 1628, at Schloss Barth, to Francis Charles of Saxe-Lauenburg, ten years her junior, who was a general in the imperial army. The same year her sister, Elisabeth Sophia of Brandenburg, had married Francis Charles' brother, Julius Henry. Both brothers were well known to Agnes, as their mother, Maria of Brunswick-Lüneburg, was a sister of Agnes' former mother-in-law, Sophia Hedwig of Brunswick-Wolfenbüttel.

With her second marriage, Agnes lost her rights to Barth. However, Francis Charles persuaded Wallenstein to force Duke Bogislaw XIV to allow her to keep Barth until her death. Agnes also brought 20,000 thaler in dowry with her into the marriage. After her marriage, Agnes moved to Neuhaus castle. Both of her marriages were childless.

== Death ==
Agnes died on 26 March 1629. After her death, Francis Charles married her great-niece, Catherine of Brandenburg.
