= Johann Philipp Palthen =

German historian (1672–1710)

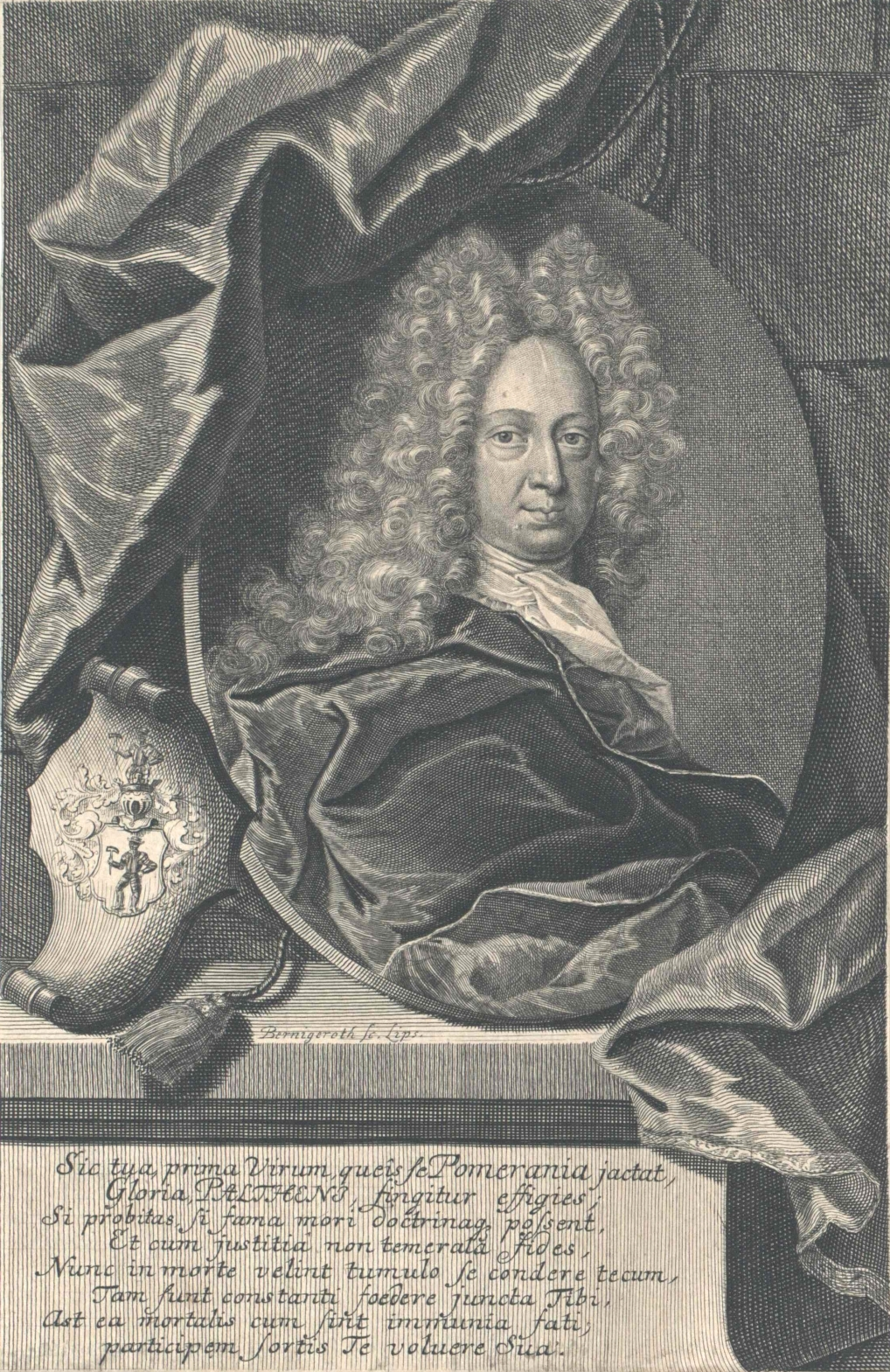
- Johann Philipp Palthen Bernigeroth
- Born: 26 June 1672; Wolgast, Swedish Pomerania
- Died: 26 May 1710 (aged 37); Greifswald, Swedish Pomerania
- Education: University of Greifswald
- Occupations: Historian; Philologist; University Rector (Greifswald 1708)
- Parent(s): Johann Palthen; Dorothea Hoppe

Johann Philipp Palthen (26 June 1672 – 26 May 1710) was a Western Pomeranian historian and philologist.

== Life ==
Palthen was born in Wolgast, a port in what was then Swedish Pomerania. His father was Johann Palthen, a senior official at the court, and his mother, born Dorothea Hoppe, also came from one of the town's leading families. The boy attended the Gymnasium (school) in Greifswald, moving on to Greifswald University where he studied between 1688 and 1691.

He was able to attract influential patrons from early on in his career, and after his graduation he obtained a post with Johann Friedrich Mayer, as a tutor and librarian, based in Hamburg. Palthen was also able to accompany Mayer during an extensive tour that took in the Netherlands, Denmark and the Swedish mainland. Another patron was Samuel von Pufendorf whose wife was related to the Palthens. It was through the intervention of von Putendorf that in 1694 Nils Bielke, the Swedish governor general, appointed Johann Philipp Palthen, still aged only 22, as Professor of Mathematics and Morality at the University of Greifswald.

More travel came in 1697 and 1698 when Palthen accompanied Bielke's sons on a visit to France and England. In Paris he studied the works of Jean Mabillon, Étienne Baluze, Jean Hardouin, Louis Du Four and Pierre Daniel Huet, and was able to meet some of these. It seems likely that it was Du Four that stimulated his interest in Tatian which he was then able to pursue further in Oxford.

Palthen returned to Greifswald in 1699, taking a professorship in History. He had been in regular correspondence with his patron Johann Friedrich Mayer since 1694, and in 1701 Mayer was appointed General Superintendent for Swedish Pomerania and full professor in Theology at Greifswald, after which Palthen was able to use the Theology faculty's extensive library for his studies. Together with Mayer he set about organising the launch of a new "Learned Society in 1704", but the project came to nothing due to factionalism at the university between advocates of Pietism and adherents of Lutheran orthodoxy. In 1708, Johann Philipp Palthen served as Rector of the university.

During his stay at Oxford, in 1698, Palthen got hold of a copy of Tatian's Gospel harmony, based on a manuscript of an Old High German translation attributed to Franciscus Junius. He managed to obtain financial backing from Magnus Lagerström (effectively the Swedish viceroy in Swedish Pommerania) to have the work printed at Greifswald in 1706. As well as his lectures, Palthen devoted his scholarly endeavours at Greifswald to German history, Natural and State Law and the work of Hugo Grotius. He also devoted time and meticulous care to the collection and archiving of numerous "Res Gestae" and other source documents which, because of his work three centuries ago, survive today in archival collections in Greifswald, Stralsund and Putbus.
