= Philipp Julius, Duke of Pomerania =

Philipp Julius
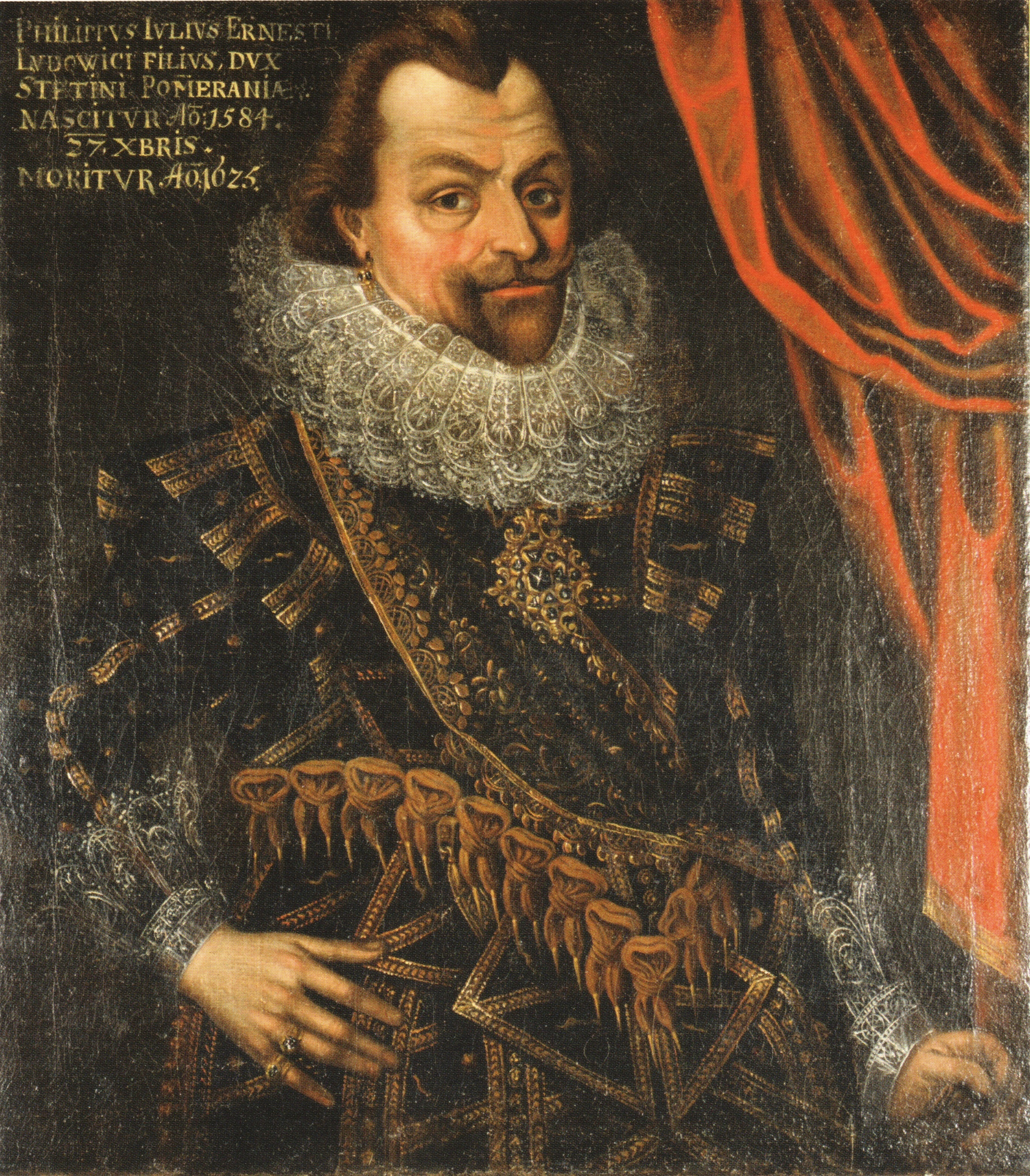
- Anonymous copy of a portrait, c. 1750

Duke of Pomerania-Wolgast
- Reign: 17 June 1592 – 6 February 1625
- Predecessor: Ernst Ludwig
- Successor: Bogislaw XIV
- Born: 27 December 1584; Wolgast
- Died: 6 February 1625 (aged 40)
- Spouse: Agnes of Brandenburg
Names
- German: Philipp Julius von Pommern; Polish: Filip Juliusz wołogoski
- House: House of Griffin
- Father: Ernst Ludwig, Duke of Pomerania
- Mother: Sophia Hedwig of Brunswick-Wolfenbüttel

Philipp Julius (27 December 1584, in Wolgast – 6 February 1625) was duke of Pomerania in the Teilherzogtum Pomerania-Wolgast from 1592 to 1625.

== Biography ==
=== Early life ===
Philipp Julius was the son of Ernst Ludwig, Duke of Pomerania, and Sophia Hedwig, daughter of Julius of Brunswick-Lüneburg. Ernst Ludwig died on 17 July 1592. From 1592 to 1603, Philipp Julius was under the tutelage of his uncle, Bogislaw XIII. During this time, he received his education at the University of Leipzig, and afterwards travelled to nearly all courts from England to Italy. On 25 June 1604, he married Agnes of Brandenburg (1584-1629), daughter of John George, Elector of Brandenburg and his second wife, Elisabeth of Anhalt-Zerbst.

A month after his marriage, Philipp Julius reached his majority and took on his position as a duke on 21 July 1604. He continued his extensive travelling, visiting England, the Dutch Republic, Denmark, Berlin, Danzig, Courland, and other locations en route. His travelling caused him to be absent for years.

=== Financial crisis ===
Philipp Julius suffered serious financial difficulties throughout his reign. While not curtailing his own expenses, he limited the travels of the functionaries of his court. Also, most of the ducal domains were leased to third parties, causing a significant worsening of the peasants' situation. The rate of compulsory work the peasants were obliged to doubled during Philipp Julius' reign. Studies revealed that nearly all peasants on the island of Rügen were impoverished or indebted by the time of his death. The duke also attempted to get the Hanseatic towns of Greifswald and Stralsund to assume parts of his debts, triggering heavy conflicts. In 1604, an intervention in Greifswald's inner affairs went in his favour. In 1612, he humiliated the towns when, in disregard of their traditional autonomy, he entered their limits in company of several hundred mercenaries. In 1613, Philipp Julius granted town law to Bergen for a payment of 8,000 Mark.

Philipp Julius attempted to control inflation, with limited success, by seeking closer contacts to the Lower Saxon Circle, causing some conflicts with his home, Upper Saxon Circle as well as the other Pomeranian Teilherzogtum, Pomerania-Stettin. Matthias (II), Holy Roman Emperor, called in by the Upper Saxon Circle, even intervened in Philipp Julius' coining policies in the mint of Franzburg in 1616, however confused him with his cousin Philip II of Pomerania-Stettin and thus corresponded with the latter. In 1622, Philipp Julius followed an invitation of Christian IV of Denmark and participated in an assembly (Kreistag) of the Lower Saxon Circle to explore a common financial strategy. The resulting treaty of Hamburg, ratified on 14 March, was to come into effect on 6 July. The Upper Saxon Circle however forced Philipp Julius to return to the previous state on 6 November. Between 1623 and 1625, the duke also negotiated with the Danish king the sale of Rügen to the latter in return for 150,000 Reichstalers, which only failed due to Bogislaw XIV's veto.

=== Conflicts within the Upper Saxon Circle ===
The later years of Philipp Julius' reign were dominated by his struggle to maintain political independence within the Upper Saxon Circle in face of hegemonial tendencies of the Electorate of Saxony and a political crisis resulting from the evolving Thirty Years' War. In 1620, the circle's representatives were assembled in a Kreistag in Leipzig, organized by John George I, Elector of Saxony. The assembly was dominated by the Saxon electorate who had managed to prevent Brandenburg and Saxe-Weimar from participation, furthermore the delegation of Anhalt departed in the course of the negotiations. It called for a high monetary contribution of the circle's members for the mercenary army already raised by Saxony. It also claimed neutrality for the circle in the Thirty Years' War that at this time ravaged Bohemia, with the caveat of being able to switch to emperor Ferdinand II's side.

The Pomeranian delegation accepted the decisions only ad-referendum, and refused to pay its resulting obligations. Continued dunning by the Saxon electorate in 1621, which had furthered her military position by successful campaigns in Silesia, led to a meeting of Pomeranian and Brandenburgian delegations at Prenzlau in 1622 to explore a possible alliance against John George. The alliance however did not take place because of Pomeranian caveats: The Pomeranian dukes did not want to get rid of the Saxon thread at the cost of subordination to Brandenburg. Yet, they supported a Brandenburgian attempt to declare the Leipzig decisions void, which was rejected by the Saxon electorates and followed by even more dunning.

In 1623, threatened by Tilly's success in Hesse and Lower Saxony, the Brandenburgian and Saxon electorates formed an alliance, decided to raise armies, and divided the circle into two respective domains of command, with Pomerania becoming part of the Brandenburgian one. Pomerania however refused to obey the Brandenburgian command and raised its own troops. In July 1624, the Saxon-led South of the circle sided with the emperor. Philipp Julius and Bogislaw XIV of Pomerania-Stettin were also willing to come to an agreement with the emperor, and accepted imperial monetary demands that they previously had rejected. Yet, neither Philipp Julius nor Bogislaw XIV were able to push their ideas through the opposition of the nobility at the Kreistag in Jüterbog in August. Thus, Pomerania did not follow the Saxon electorate's example - neither did Brandenburg.

=== Death ===
Philipp Julius died only months before imperial forces occupied parts of the Upper Saxon circle, on 6 February 1625. He was entombed in the ducal crypt in the church of Wolgast. Two years later, the war would reach Pomerania causing complete devastation and the death of two thirds of the population.

With the death of Philipp Julius, Pomerania-Wolgast ceased to exist. Philipp Julius died without issue, and Pomerania-Wolgast fell to Bogislaw XIV, who united all of the Duchy of Pomerania under his rule until he also died without issue in 1637, marking the extinction of the House of Pomerania. The residence in Wolgast decayed after Philipp Julius' death, was badly damaged during the Thirty Years' War, and, after 1798, most of the stone was scavenged and reused in other buildings. Today, only parts of the basements remain.

== Cultural legacy ==
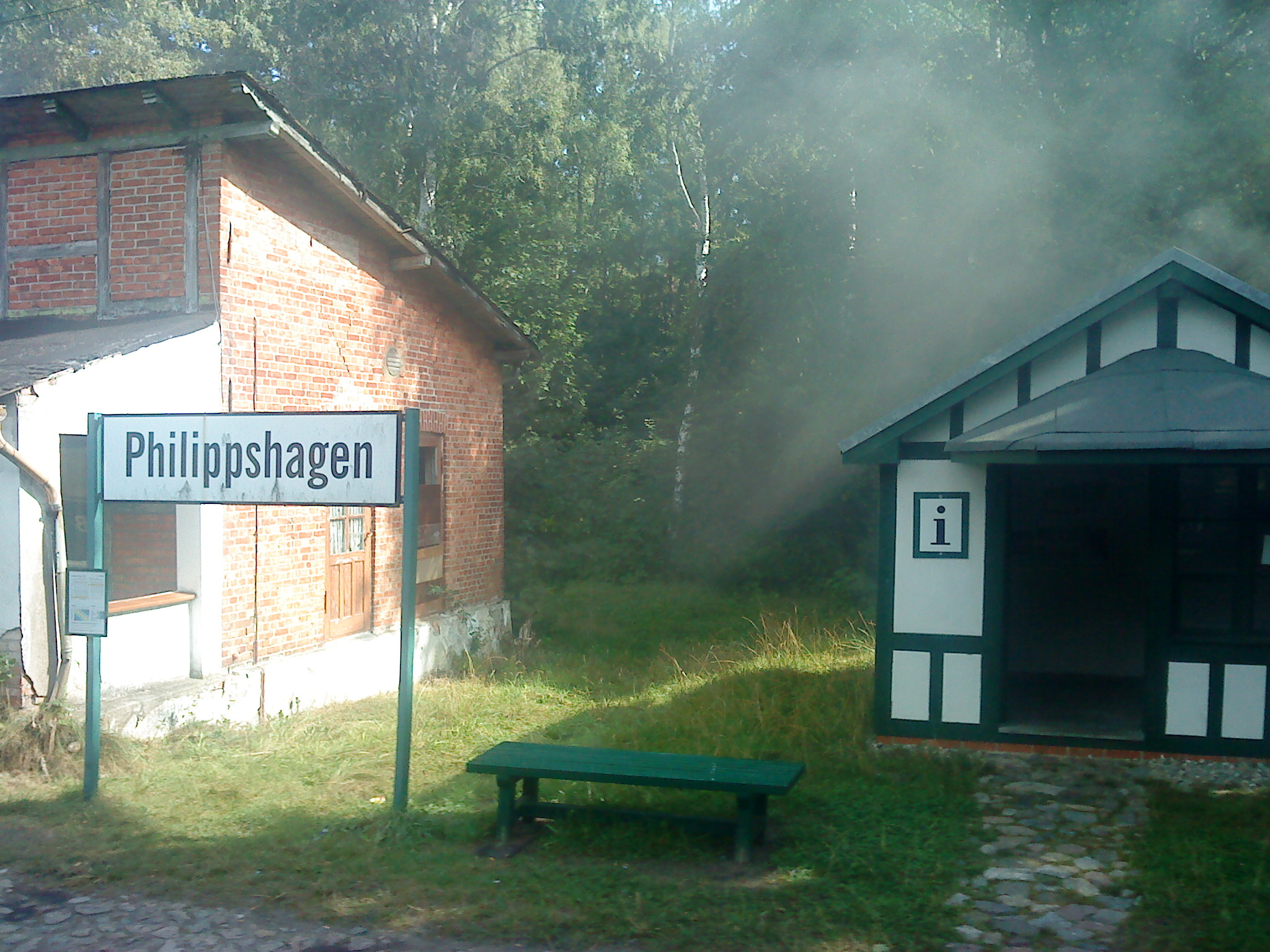
Philippshagen, named after Philipp Julius. Train station.

In 1619, Philipp Julius donated a precious gown to the rectorate of the University of Greifswald, which was worn by the rectors at special occasions until very recently. In 1999 the historical gown was exchanged for a modern one; the former is now part of the permanent exhibition in the Pomerania State Museum. Philipp Julius promoted theater and music at his court, in part inspired by his travels. Several English musicians are recorded to have performed in his service during the 1620s.

The village Groß-Hagen on Rügen was renamed "Philippshagen" (now part of Middelhagen) after Philipp Julius in 1608.

== Ancestors ==
Ancestors of Philipp Julius, Duke of Pomerania

8. George I, Duke of Pomerania
4. Philip I, Duke of Pomerania
9. Amalie of the Palatinate
2. Ernst Ludwig, Duke of Pomerania
10. John, Elector of Saxony
5. Maria of Saxony
11. Margaret of Anhalt-Köthen
1. Philipp Julius, Duke of Pomerania
12. Henry V, Duke of Brunswick-Lüneburg
6. Julius, Duke of Brunswick-Wolfenbüttel
13. Maria of Württemberg
3. Sophia Hedwig of Brunswick-Lüneburg
14. Joachim II Hector, Elector of Brandenburg
7. Hedwig of Brandenburg
15. Hedwig Jagiellon

== Full title ==
The complete title of Philipp Julius was:

- in German: "Philipp Julius, Herzog zu Stettin, Pommern, der Kaschuben und Wenden, Fürst zu Rügen, Graf zu Gützkow, der Lande Lauenburg und Bütow Herr"
- English translation: "Philipp Julius, duke of Stettin, Pomerania, the Kashubians and the Wends, prince of Rügen, count of Gützkow, lord of the Lauenburg and Bütow Land."

== See also ==
- Duchy of Pomerania
- House of Pomerania
- List of Pomeranian duchies and dukes
- Partitions of the Duchy of Pomerania
- Pomerania during the Early Modern Age
- Upper Saxon Circle
- Thirty Years' War

== Sources ==
=== Bibliography ===
- Asche, Matthias; Schindling, Anton (2008). Krieg, Militär und Migration in der frühen Neuzeit (in German). Berlin-Hamburg-Münster: LIT Verlag. ISBN 978-3-8258-9863-2.
- Boëthius, Bertil; Nilzén, Göran (1987). Svenskt biografiskt lexikon (in Swedish) (25 ed.). A. Bonnier.
- Branig, Hans; Buchholz, Werner (1997). Geschichte Pommerns: Vom Werden des neuzeitlichen Staates bis zum Verlust der staatlichen Selbständigkeit, 1300-1648 (in German). Böhlau. ISBN 3-412-07189-7.
- Buchholz, Werner, ed. (1999). Pommern (in German). Siedler. ISBN 3-88680-780-0.
- Dubilski, Petra (2003). Usedom (in German). DuMont. ISBN 3-7701-5978-0.
- Evans, J. A.; Unger, R. W. (1979). Studies in medieval and Renaissance history. 13 (2 ed.). AMS Press. ISBN 0-404-62850-8.
- Goetz, Rolf (2006). Usedom, Wollin, Festlandsküste (in German). ADAC Verlag. ISBN 3-89905-294-3.
- Grewolls, Grete (1995). Wer war wer in Mecklenburg-Vorpommern? Ein Personenlexikon. Edition Temmen. ISBN 3-86108-282-9.
- Heinrich, Gerd (1981). Geschichte Preußens (in German). Propyläen. ISBN 3-549-07620-7.
- Hildisch, Johannes (1980). Die Münzen der pommerschen Herzöge von 1569 bis zum Erlöschen des Greifengeschlechtes (in German). Böhlau. ISBN 3-412-04679-5.
- Jendricke, Bernhard; Gockel, Gabriele (2008). Rügen, Hiddensee (in German) (3 ed.). DuMont. ISBN 978-3-7701-6058-7.
- Kaak, Heinrich (1991). Die Gutsherrschaft: Theoriegeschichtliche Untersuchungen zum Agrarwesen im ostelbischen Raum (in German). Walter de Gruyter. ISBN 3-11-012800-4.
- Krüger, Joachim (2006). Zwischen dem Reich und Schweden: die landesherrliche Münzprägung im Herzogtum Pommern und in Schwedisch-Pommern in der frühen Neuzeit (ca. 1580 - 1715) (in German). LIT Verlag Berlin-Hamburg-Münster. ISBN 3-8258-9768-0.
- Nicklas, Thomas (2002). Macht oder Recht: frühneuzeitliche Politik im Obersächsischen Reichskreis (in German). Franz Steiner Verlag. ISBN 3-515-07939-4.
- Porada, Haik Thomas (1997). Beiträge zur Geschichte Vorpommerns: Die Demminer Kolloquien 1985-1994 (in German). T. Helms. ISBN 3-931185-11-7.
- Schleinert, Dirk (2001). Die Gutswirtschaft im Herzogtum Pommern-Wolgast im 16. und frühen 17. Jahrhundert (in German). Böhlau. ISBN 3-412-10401-9.
- Schwarz, Werner (1988). Pommersche Musikgeschichte: Historischer Überblick und Lebensbilder (in German). Böhlau. ISBN 3-412-04382-6.
- Stannek, Antje (2001). Telemachs Brüder: die höfische Bildungsreise des 17. Jahrhunderts (in German). Campus Verlag. ISBN 3-593-36726-2.
- Steffen, Wilhelm (1963). Kulturgeschichte von Rügen bis 1815 (in German). Böhlau.
- Thümmel, Hans Georg; Helwig, Christoph (2002). Thümmel, Hans Georg (ed.). Geschichte der Medizinischen Fakultät Greifswald: Geschichte der Medizinischen Fakultät von 1456 bis 1713 von Christoph Helwig D.J. und das Dekanatsbuch der Medizinischen Fakultät von 1714 bis 1823 (in German). Franz Steiner Verlag. ISBN 3-515-07908-4.
- Wade, Mara R. (2003). Pomp, Power, and Politics: Essays on German and Scandinavian Court Culture and Their Contexts. Rodopi. ISBN 90-420-1711-2.
- Wolgast, Eike (1995). Hochstift und Reformation: Studien zur Geschichte der Reichskirche zwischen 1517 und 1648 (in German). F. Steiner. ISBN 3-515-06526-1.

Philipp Julius, Duke of Pomerania House of Pomerania Born: 27 December 1584 Died: 6 February 1625
Preceded by Ernst Ludwig	Duke of Pomerania; 1592–1625	Succeeded by Bogislaw XIV
