= Loissin =

- Municipality
- Location of Loissin within Vorpommern-Greifswald district
- Interactive map of Loissin
- Location within Germany Location within Mecklenburg-Vorpommern
- Coordinates: 54°07′N 13°32′E
- Country: Germany
- State: Mecklenburg-Vorpommern
- District: Vorpommern-Greifswald
- Municipal assoc.: Lubmin
- Subdivisions: 3

Government
  - Mayor: Detlef Sadewasser

Area
  - Total: 15.29 km^{2} (5.90 sq mi)
- Elevation: 2 m (6.6 ft)

Population (2025-12-31)
  - Total: 795
  - Density: 52.0/km^{2} (135/sq mi)
- Time zone: UTC+01:00 (CET)
  - Summer (DST): UTC+02:00 (CEST)
- Postal codes: 17509
- Dialling codes: 038352
- Vehicle registration: VG
- Website: www.amtlubmin.de

Loissin (German pronunciation: [ˈløːsɪn]) is a municipality in the Vorpommern-Greifswald district, in Mecklenburg-Vorpommern, Germany.
