= Gotthard Kettler =

Duke of Courland and Semigallia from 1561 to 1587

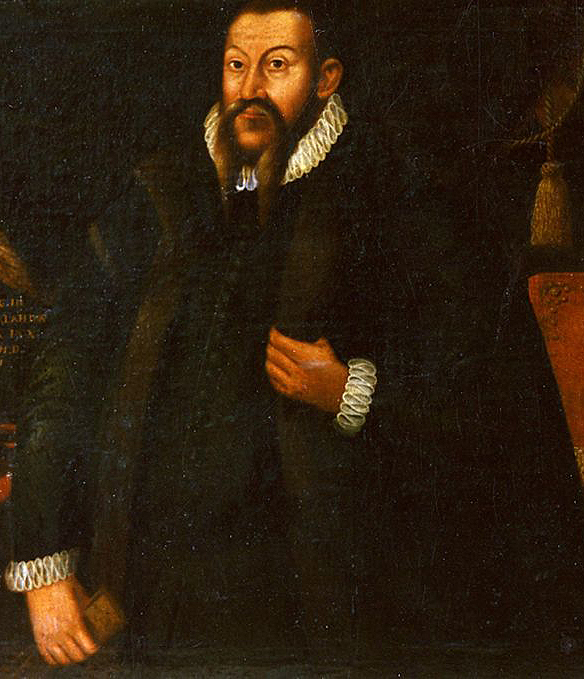
- Portrait, 1584

Duke of Courland and Semigallia
- Reign: 28 November 1561 – 17 May 1587
- Successor: Friedrich Kettler
- Born: 2 February 1517; Anröchte, Duchy of Cleves, Holy Roman Empire
- Died: 17 May 1587 (aged 70); Mitau, Duchy of Courland and Semigallia
- Burial: Ducal crypt in the Jelgava Palace
- Spouse: Duchess Anna of Mecklenburg (m. 1566)
- Issue: Anna, Princess Radziwiłł; Friedrich, Duke of Semigallia; Wilhelm, Duke of Courland
- House: Kettler
- Father: Gotthard Kettler zu Melrich
- Mother: Sophie of Nesselrode
- Religion: Lutheranism

Gotthard Kettler, Duke of Courland (also Godert or Ketteler; German: Gotthard Kettler, Herzog von Kurland; Latvian: Gothards Ketlers; Latin: Gothardus, etc.; 2 February 1517 – 17 May 1587) was the last Master of the Livonian Order from 1559 to 1561 and the first Duke of Courland and Semigallia from 1561 to 1587.

== Biography ==
Kettler was born near Anröchte, Kreis Soest, of an old Westphalian noble family. He was the ninth child of the German knight Gotthard Kettler zu Melrich and his wife Sophie of Nesselrode. Gotthard's older brother Wilhelm Kettler was the bishop of Münster from 1553 to 1557.

Kettler enlisted in the Livonian Order around 1537 and became a knight. In 1554, Gotthard Kettler became Komtur of Dünaburg (Daugavpils), and in 1557 Komtur of Fellin (Viljandi). In 1559, admist the Livonian War, Kettler succeeded Wilhelm von Fürstenberg as Master of the Teutonic Order in Livonia.

When the Livonian Confederation came under increasing pressure from Ivan IV of Russia, Kettler converted to Lutheranism and secularised Semigallia and Courland. On the basis of the Treaty of Vilnius (28 November 1561), he created the Duchy of Courland and Semigallia as a vassal state of the Grand Duchy of Lithuania, which was soon merged into the Polish–Lithuanian Commonwealth.

Following the duke's proposal in 1567, the regional assembly (landtag) decided to build 70 new churches and 8 schools in the remote areas of the duchy where many peasants still lived and died unbaptized.

He died on 17 May 1587 in Mitau (Jelgava), aged 70. His heirs ruled in Courland until 1737.

== Family ==
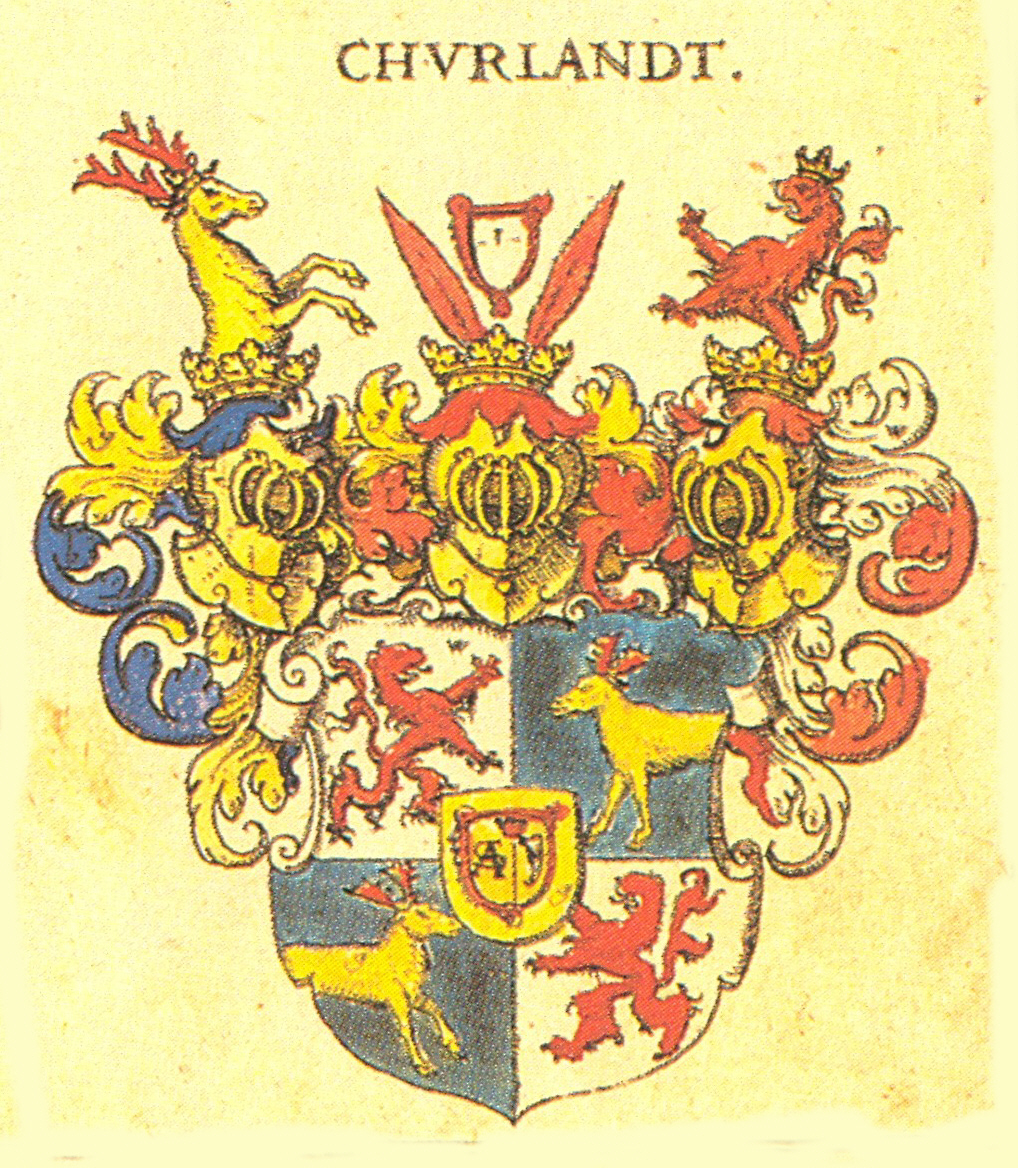
Ancestral coat of arms of the Kettler, princes of Courland and Semigalia according to German heraldry presented by Johann Siebmacher.

On 11 March 1566 Kettler married Anna, Duchess of Mecklenburg, daughter of Duke Albert VII of Mecklenburg-Güstrow and Princess Anna of Brandenburg.

The couple had seven children, three of whom died early. His sons Friedrich Kettler and Wilhelm Kettler succeeded him as dukes. The daughter Anna Kettler married the Polish-Lithuanian prince Albrecht Radziwiłł, the son of Mikołaj "the Black" Radziwiłł, the daughter Elisabeth Kettler married the Adam Wenceslaus, Duke of Cieszyn, from the Duchy of Teschen.

== Bibliography ==
- "Кетлер, Готгарс" . Brockhaus and Efron Encyclopedic Dictionary (in Russian). 1906.
- Grusemann, Hans, 1990. Die Frühgeschichte des Geschlechts Ketteler (Kettler), 12.-16. Jahrhundert. Soest.
- Schwennicke, Ditleff. Europäische Stammtafeln zur Geschichte der Europäischen Staaten (Neue Folge), Band VIII, Tafel 91 (Die Ketteler).
- Salomon Henning's Chronicle of Courland and Livonia, translated and edited by Jerry C. Smith, William Urban and Ward Jones
- Heinz Matthiesen (1964). "Gotthard Kettler". Neue Deutsche Biographie (in German). Vol. 6. Berlin: Duncker & Humblot. pp. 678–679. (full text online).
- Theodor Schiemann, Wilhelm Crecelius (1882). "Kettler, Gotthard" . Allgemeine Deutsche Biographie (in German). Vol. 15. Leipzig: Duncker & Humblot. pp. 680–685.

Preceded by Title created	Duke of Courland; 1561–1587	Succeeded by Friedrich Kettler
