= Wolgast Castle =

Demolished castle in Wolgast, Mecklenburg-Vorpommern, Germany

- Schloss Wolgast
- Wolgast
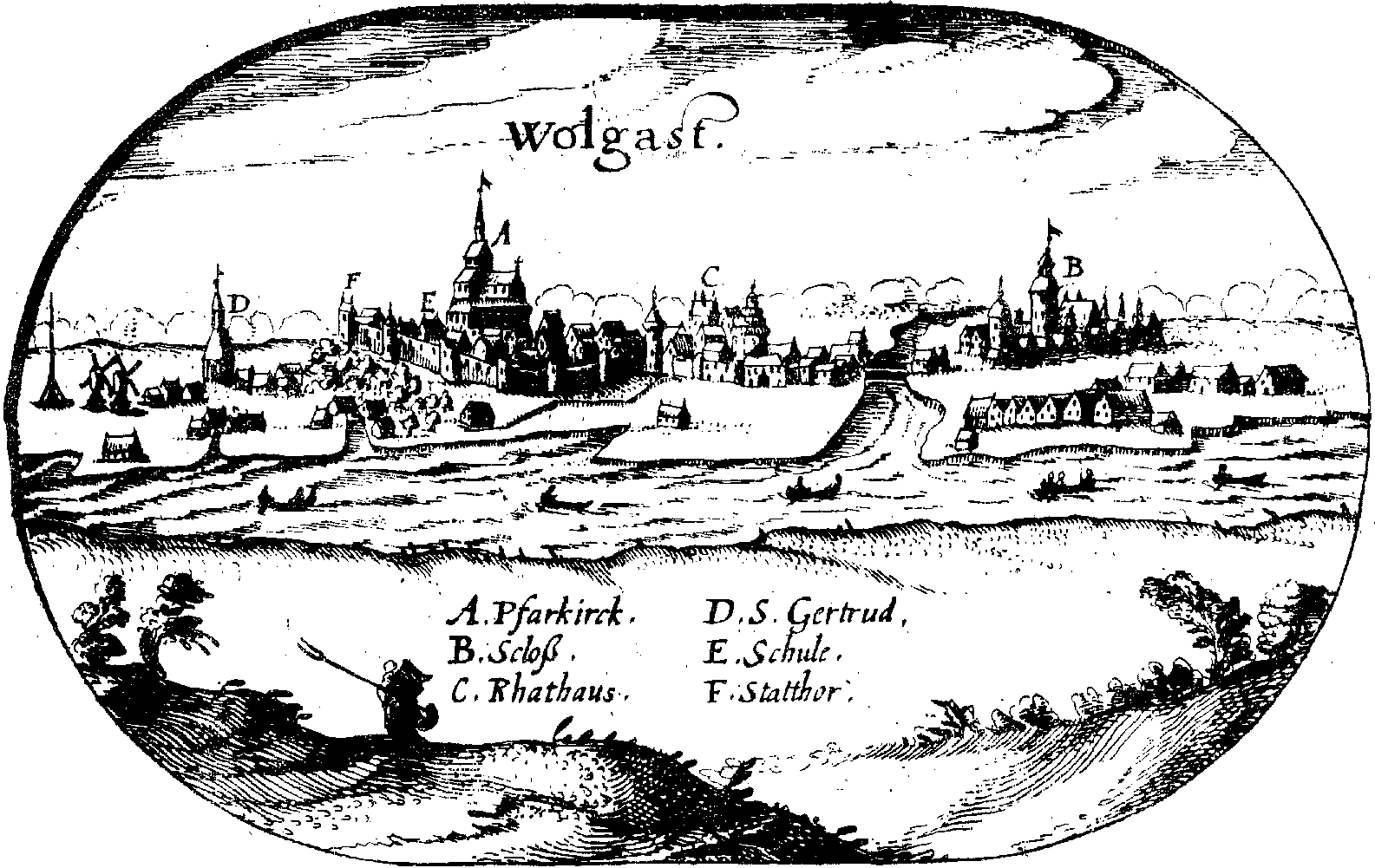
- The Castle (right) on an early 17th-century view of the city, part of the Map of Lubinus

Location
- Shown within Mecklenburg-Vorpommern
- Coordinates: 54.056°N 13.782°E

Site history
- Built: 1496
- Demolished: 1820s

Wolgast Castle was a castle in the city of Wolgast in the northeast of today's Mecklenburg-Vorpommern. It was located on a small barrier island in the Peenestrom, the strait which separates Usedom island from the mainland. The island is still called "Castle Island". The castle was one of the most important Renaissance buildings in Northern Germany. It existed from 1496, when it replaced an earlier castle on the island, until it was demolished in the 1820s. After it was demolished, the materials were used to construct other buildings, so no ruins exist. Only a few items from the castle have been preserved in various exhibitions. A reminder of the castle is the coat of arms of the city of Wolgast, which shows a castle tower between two griffins.
