= Friedrich Kettler =

Duke of Courland and Semigallia from 1587 to 1642

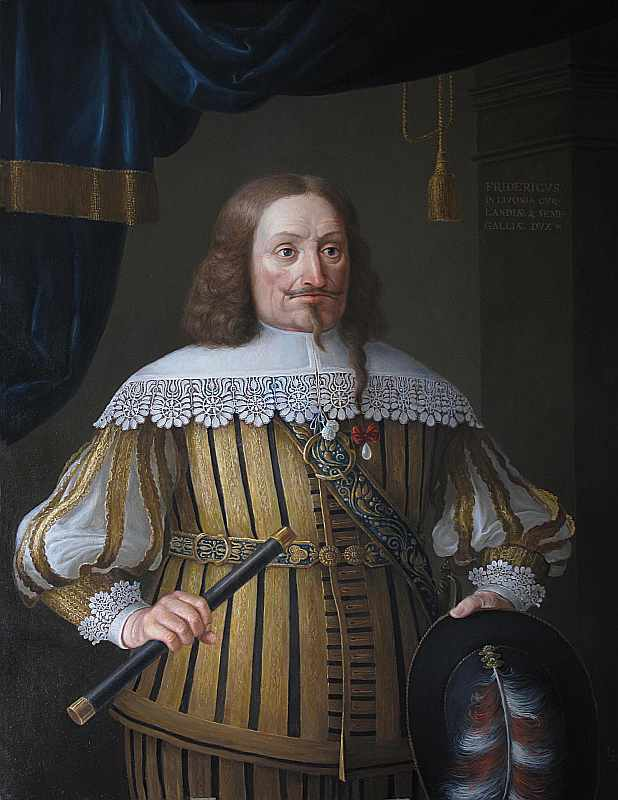

Duke of Courland and Semigallia
- Reign: 17 May 1587– 17 August 1642
- Predecessor: Gotthard Kettler
- Successor: Jacob Kettler
- Born: 25 November 1569; Mitau, Duchy of Courland and Semigallia
- Died: 17 August 1642 (aged 72); Mitau, Duchy of Courland and Semigallia
- Burial: Ducal crypt in the Schloss Mitau
- Spouse: Elisabeth Magdalena of Pomerania
- House: Kettler
- Father: Gotthard Kettler
- Mother: Anna of Mecklenburg
- Religion: Lutheran

Friedrich Kettler (Latvian: Frīdrihs Ketlers; 25 November 1569 – 17 August 1642) was Duke of Courland and Semigallia from 1587 to 1642.

He was the son of Gotthard Kettler, the first Duke of Courland. Until 1617, he ruled only the eastern Zemgale (Semigallia) portion of the duchy, while his younger brother, Wilhelm Kettler, ruled the western Courland portion. Friedrich ruled the entire duchy from 1617 onward, after his brother emigrated due to conflicts with the nobility.

== Life and reign ==
Friedrich Kettler was born to Gotthard Kettler and his wife, Anna of Mecklenburg. The first of two sons, Friedrich in his youth had a good education and travelled to many other European countries. According to Gotthard Kettler's will, the duchy was to be divided between his two sons.

After his father's death in 1587, Friedrich and his younger brother, Wilhelm, became co-rulers of the duchy. After Wilhelm reached his majority in 1596, the duchy was officially partitioned into its Courland and Semigallian parts.

During the Polish–Swedish War, Friedrich and Wilhelm led their troops in battles against the Swedes, with Friedrich leading 300 big cavalry units in the Battle of Salaspils (1605). During the war, Courland's aristocracy grew in their resistance to the ruling Kettler brothers.

In 1617, the Regional Assembly of Courland (Landtag) sat in Schrunden Castle and decided that Wilhelm be stripped of his title and banished. The following year, Friedrich was elected as the sole Duke of Courland, and he approved a new constitution, Formula Regiminis, which gave greater rights to the aristocracy. Among the new parameters set by this constitution were that the duke could not implement decisions without the prior consent of the duchy's council, thus making Courland a constitutional monarchy.

In 1622, the duke's residence in Mitau was surrounded by the Swedish army, forcing Friedrich to move to Goldingen (now Kuldiga).

== Marriage ==
Friedrich Kettler married Elisabeth Magdalena of Pomerania in 1600. They did not have issue, so in 1625, he proposed that Wilhelm's son, Jacob, be recognised as heir. The duchy's council agreed to this proposal, and Jacob was made co-ruler in 1638.

== Sources ==
- Heinz Mattiesen (1961). "Friedrich Kettler". Neue Deutsche Biographie (in German). Vol. 5. Berlin: Duncker & Humblot. p. 513. (full text online).

Preceded by Gotthard Kettler	Duke of Courland; 1587–1642	Succeeded by Jacob Kettler
