= Biron family =

Baltic German noble family

House of Biron
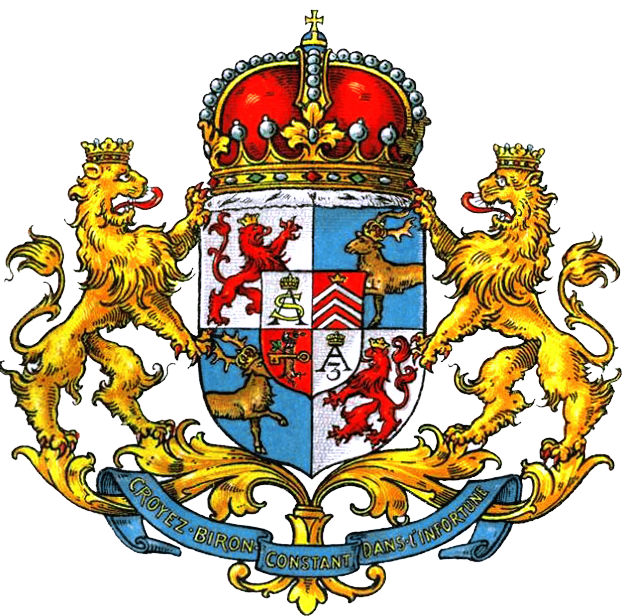
- Country: Duchy of Courland and Semigallia; Polish–Lithuanian Commonwealth; Duchy of Prussia; Grand Duchy of Finland; Russian Empire
- Founded: 18th century
- Founder: Ernst Johann von Biron
- Current head: Michael von Biron, Prince of Courland
- Final ruler: Peter von Biron
- Titles: Duke, Regent
- Estates: Latvia, Russia, Poland
- Deposition: 1795

The House of Biron is a distinguished Baltic German aristocratic family which was the ruling family of the Duchy of Courland and Semigallia. The family also enjoyed privileges and influence during the times of the Polish–Lithuanian Commonwealth and in the Russian Empire.

== History ==
Initially von Bühren, the family came from Büren, Westphalia, Germany to Courland and were part of the retinue of Gotthard Kettler, Duke of Courland. The family rose to prominence when the last member of the reigning House of Kettler was left without any male heirs. As a result, Ernst Johann von Biron, a lover of Empress Anna of Russia, succeeded Ferdinand Kettler as Duke of Courland and Semigallia.

After that, the family ruled the Duchy of Courland and Semigallia for periods of time between 1737 and 1795. However, the dynasty was short lived and ended with Peter von Biron, who died in 1800 with no male heirs. Today, the existing line of the family are descendants of Prince Karl Ernst, Duke Peter's younger brother.

== Family tree ==
- Karl von Bühren ∞ Catharina Hedwig von Raab genannt Thülen (1660–1740)
  - Ernst Johann von Biron (1690–1772), duke of Courland and Semigallia, lord of Sycow ∞ Benigna Gottliebe von Trotta genannt Treyden (1703–1782)
    - Peter von Biron (1724–1800), duke of Courland and Semigallia, duke of Sagan, lord of Sycow ∞ Princess Caroline of Waldeck and Pyrmont (1748–1782) ∞ Princess Eudoxia Yusupova (1743–1780) ∞ Countess Dorothea Anna Charlotte von Medem (1761–1821)
      - Wilhelmine von Biron (1781–1839), princess of Courland, duchess of Sagan ∞ Prince Louis de Rohan-Guémenée (1768–1836) ∞ Prince Vasily Troubetskoy (1776–1841) ∞ Count Karl Rudolf von der Schulenburg (1788–1856)
      - Marie Luisa Paulina von Biron (1782–1845), princess of Courland, duchess of Sagan ∞ Friedrich Hermann Otto, Prince of Hohenzollern-Hechingen (1776–1838)
      - Princess Dorothea, Comtesse Edmond de Périgord, Duchesse de Dino (1816), Duchesse de Talleyrand (1838), Duchess of Sagan (1845) (1793–1862), married Comte Edmond de Périgord in 1809. the duchy of Sagan continues in her descendance.
      - Johanna Katharina von Biron (1783–1876), princess of Courland ∞ Prince Francesco Pignatelli, Duke of Acerenza (1766–1840)
    - Karl Ernst von Biron (1728–1801), prince of Courland ∞ Princess Apollonia Poninska (1760–1800)
      - Gustav Kalixt von Biron (1780–1821) ∞ Countess Franziska von Maltzahn (1790–1849)
        - Karl Prinz Biron von Curland (1811–1848) ∞ Countess Agnes zur Lippe-Biesterfeld (1810–1884)
        - Kalixt von Biron (1817–1882) ∞ Princess Elena Meshchersky (1820–1905)
          - Gustav von Biron (1859–1941) ∞ Princess Adele zu Löwenstein-Wertheim-Freudenberg (1866–1890) ∞ Francoise Levisse de Montigny de Jaucourt (1874–1957)
            - Karl von Biron (1907–1982) ∞ Princess Herzeleide of Prussia (1918–1989)
              - Victoria Benigna von Biron (*1939) ∞ Baron Johann von Twickel (b. 1940)
              - Ernst-Johann Biron, Prince of Courland (1940—2026) ∞ Countess Elisabeth of Isenburg-Philippseich (b. 1941)
              - Michael von Biron, Prince of Courland, current head (*1944) ∞ Kristin von Oertzen (b. 1944)
                - Veronika von Biron (*1970) ∞ Christoph Carl
                - Alexander von Biron (*1972) ∞ Countess Michaela Strachwitz von Groß-Zauche und Camminetz (b. 1979)
                  - Cosima von Biron (*2010)
                  - Emma von Biron (*2012)
                  - Louisa von Biron (*2015)
                - Stefanie von Biron (*1975) ∞ Georg Gruber
            - Friedrich Franz von Biron (1910–1997) ∞ Countess Maria-Irmgard von Ballestrem (1908–1993)
              - Franz Kalixt von Biron (1934–2024) ∞ Baroness Gustava von Brockdorff ( 1939–2015)
                - Marcus von Biron (*1967)
                - Kalixta (*1975) ∞ Christian Georg Fuchs
              - Gustav von Biron (*1941) ∞ Adelheid Greite (b. 1943)
                - Alexandra (*1970)
                - Franziska (*1975)
