= Princess Joanna of Courland =

Joanna Biron
- Duchess of Acerenza
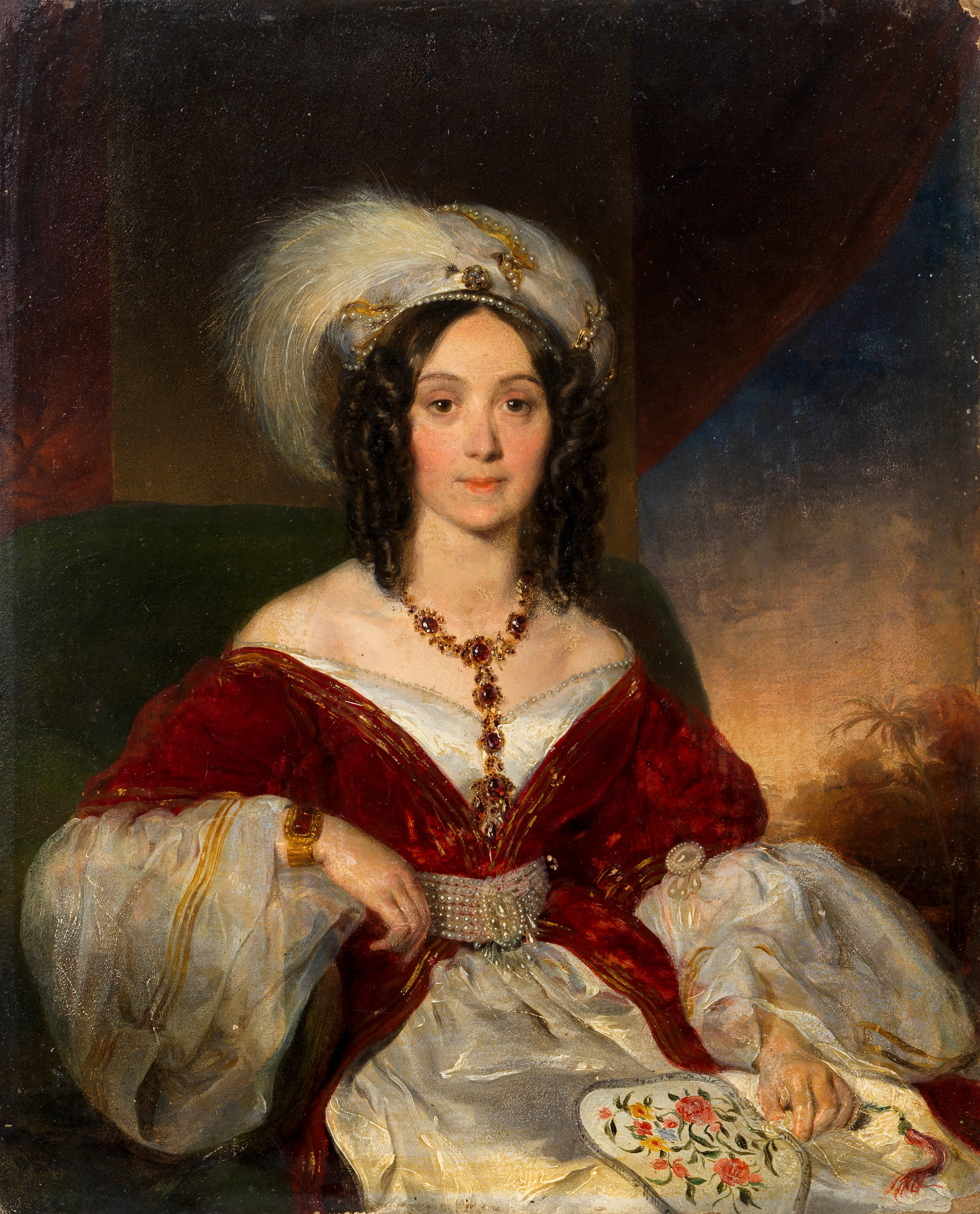
- Johanna of Courland by Moritz Michael Daffinger, c. 1820
- Born: 24 June 1783; Mitau, Duchy of Courland and Semigallia
- Died: 11 April 1876 (aged 92); Löbichau, Thuringia, German Empire
- Burial: Biron Mausoleum, Evangelical Church of Grace, Szprotawa, German Empire (modern-day Lubuskie, Poland)
- Spouse: Prince Francis Pignatelli Belmonte, Duke of Acerenza (m. 1801; sep. 1806)
- Issue: Frederick von Piattoli (illegitimate)
Names
- Joanna Katharina
- House: Biron
- Father: Peter von Biron
- Mother: Dorothea von Medem

Johanna Katharina von Biron, Princess of Courland and Duchess of Acerenza (24 June 1783 – 11 April 1876) was a German princess from the ruling family of Courland and Semigallia (today part of Latvia) and a Duchess of Acerenza as the third daughter of Peter von Biron and Dorothea von Medem and the wife of Prince Francis Pignatelli Belmonte, Duke of Acerenza, she was mainly known for a scandalous relationship with Arnoldi, a musician from Italy.

== Life ==
=== Early life ===
Joanna was born to the last Duke of Courland and Semigallia, Peter von Biron and his wife Dorothea von Medem. She spent her childhood and youth in the palace in Żagań, which was the center of the Biron estate in Silesia, known as the Duchy of Żagań. Joanna and her three sisters: Wilhelmine, Pauline and Dorothea were raised without the participation of their parents, under the care of governesses and servants.

=== Scandalous relationship ===
At the age of 16, she fell in love with an Italian, Arnoldi, who was a musician performing in the prince's theater. According to popular opinion, the relationship between the musician and the duchess was a misalliance, so the young couple made an unsuccessful attempt to escape to America. After the "disgrace" committed by his daughter, her father, Peter Biron left for Prague, and at the end of his life (died in January 1800) disinherited her. Joanna was captured and, on her father's order, handed over to the care of Count Wratislaw, the chief of police in Prague. Arnoldi managed to escape, but the letters he sent to Joanna were intercepted by the count. Impersonating the young princess, he arranged a meeting with the Italian, during which he was captured and soon murdered.

After Arnoldi's death, their son Frederick (Fritz) von Piattoli was born (19 September 1800, Prague – 6 April 1849, Gödöllő Palace, Hungary), who was raised apart from his mother due to his father's origins.

=== Marriage ===
After being disinherited, the princess found shelter with the Neapolitan Queen Maria Carolina, who on 18 March 1801 in Dresden married her to an Italian from Naples, Francis Pignatelli Belmonte d'Acerenza (13 February 1766 – 20 December 1827). This marriage did not stand the test of time and ended in separation in 1806.

=== Later life ===
In 1806, Joanna received the Courland Palace in Dresden, and after her mother's death (1821), she inherited the Löbichau estate in the Duchy of Saxe-Altenburg.

She spent a lot her her later life living with her sister, Princess Pauline, Duchess of Sagan (who was also separated from her husband) lived together in Vienna. Her closest friends were Alfred I, Prince of Windisch-Grätz, duke Wallmoden, Fürstin Schwarzenberg and Heinrich Laube. As was usual at that time, the duchess had a "Salon" every other day. After her sister Pauline died, she moved to Löbichau to live in the estate she inherited off her mother.

She died at the age of 92 in Löbichau, and her body was finally laid to rest in the grave chapel of the Church of Grace in Szprotawa, in the Biron mausoleum where the remaining Protestant members of the Biron family, including her father Peter, were buried.

== Literature ==
- Katarzyna Adamek, Marian Ryszard Świątek: Żagań known and unknown. Historical guide to the city and surrounding area, Żagań
- Żagań portraits, Joanna Katarzyna Biron, Zbigniew Janicki, "Goniec Żagański", Żagań, March 1999
- Hugo Weczerka (Hg.): Handbuch der historischen Stätten Schlesien, Stuttgart 1977
