= Boris Grigoryevich Yusupov =

Russian nobleman

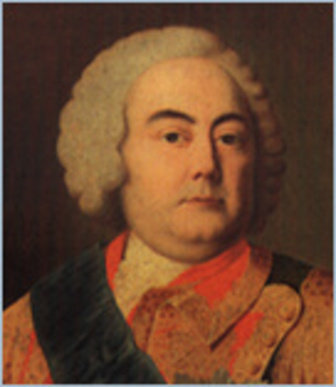

Prince Boris Grigoryevich Yusupov (Russian : Борис Григорьевич Юсупов; 1695–1759) was a Russian nobleman and politician.

== Life ==
From the house of Yusupov, a Russian noble family descended from 10th-century khans, he was elected a senator and became governor general of Moscow and St Petersburg. His parents were Grigory Dmitriyevich Yusupov (1676–1730), friend and minister of war to Peter I of Russia, and his wife Anna Nikitchna Akinfova, daughter of an okolnichy (noble rank below that of boyar). He was the great-great-grandfather of prince Felix Yusupov.

At age 20, Boris was sent to study in the French navy. He became a chamberlain in 1730, governor general of Moscow in 1738 and a senator from 18 June 1695 to 3 March 1759. Under Elizabeth I of Russia he was put in control of the Russian imperial schools and in 1749 was made governor of St Petersburg.

== Marriage and issue ==
He married Irina Mikhaïlovna Zinovieva (1718-1788), daughter of Mikhaïl Petrovitch Zinoviev, with whom he had five children:

- Evdokia (1743–1780), married 1774 Peter von Biron (1724-1800), duke of Courland; separated in 1776, divorced in 1778
- Alexandra (1744–1791), married Ivan Mikhaïlovitch Izmaïlov (1724–1787)
- Elisaveta (1745–1770), in 1764 married prince Andreï Mikhaïlovitch Golitsyn (1729–1770)
- Anna (1749–1772), in 1771 married Alexandre Iakovlevitch Protasov (1742–1799)
- Nikolaï (1751–1831), in 1793 married Tatiana Vassilievna von Engelhart (1769–1841), one of the nieces of prince Grigori Potemkin.
