= Hedvig Elizabeth von Biron =

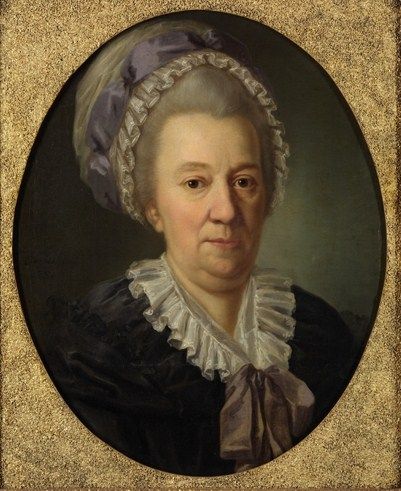
Portrait by Joseph Friedrich August Darbes, 1781

Hedvig Elizabeth von Biron of Courland (1727–1797) was a princess of Courland and a Russian courtier. She was the daughter of the duke of Courland, Ernst Johann von Biron, and Benigna Gottlieb von Trotha gt Treyden, and the sister of Peter von Biron. She was the Hofmeisterin of Empress Elizabeth of Russia and an influential person at the Russian court.

== Life ==
Hedvig Elizabeth was given an education under the protection of Empress Anna of Russia. When her father became Duke of Courland in 1737, she was given the status of a royal princess and her own personal court. She joined her parents in their imprisonment and exile in 1740.

In 1749, she managed to meet Empress Elizabeth during one of the latter's pilgrimages in Siberia. She converted to Russian Orthodoxy in Moscow, took the name Ekaterina Ivanovna and was given a place as lady in waiting. At court, she was a confidante of the heir of the throne, Peter, whose interests for everything German she shared.

In 1753, the empress arranged for her to marry Baron Alexander Ivanovich Cherkasov (1728–1788). They had one known child Elizabeth Alexandrovna Palmenbach (1761–1832). In 1763, her parents were allowed to leave their exile in Siberia, and she followed them to Courland.
