= Benigna Gottliebe Biron =

Baltic-German noblewoman (1703–1782)

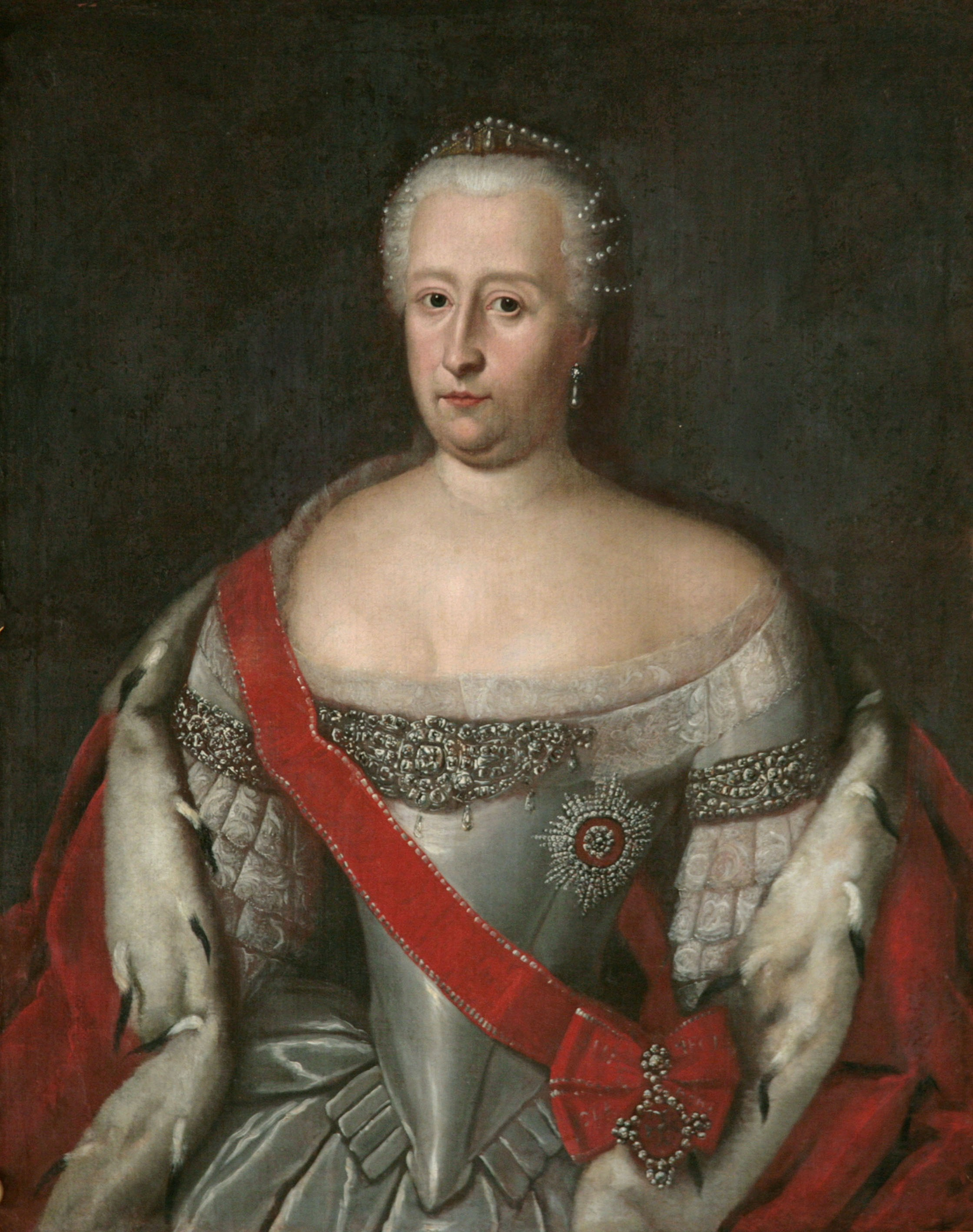
- Portrait by Louis Caravaque, 1730s

Duchess consort of Courland
- Tenure: 1737–1740 and 1763–1769
- Born: Benigna Gottliebe von Trotta genannt Treyden; 15 October 1703
- Died: 5 November 1782 (aged 79); Mitau, Duchy of Courland and Semigallia
- Burial: Ducal Crypt of the Jelgava Palace
- Spouse: Ernst Johann von Biron
- Issue: Peter von Biron (1724–1800)
- House: Biron
- Father: Wilhelm von Trotta genannt Treyden
- Mother: Anna Elisabeth von Wildemann

Benigna Gottliebe von Trotta genannt Treyden, later Biron (15 October 1703 – 5 November 1782), was a Duchess consort of Courland and lady-in-waiting to Anna of Russia, during her tenure as duchess, and a state lady during her reign as empress.

== Biography ==
Benigna Gottliebe was the daughter of the Baltic-German nobleman Wilhelm von Trotta genannt Treyden (d. 1725) and his wife, Anna Elisabeth von Wildemann. She was made a lady-in-waiting to the dowager duchess regent of Courland, Anna of Russia, in 1720, and in 1723 married to Anna's lover and adviser Ernst Johann von Bühren. The marriage was reportedly arranged by Anna in an attempt to conceal her own relationship with Biron.

=== Russia ===
When Anna became Empress of Russia in 1730, the Biron couple both followed her to Russia, retaining their position as adviser and lady in waiting. Benigna is described as haughty and bad tempered and marked with smallpox, but also as a diligent parent and lady in waiting. She spent great amounts of money on clothes and jewelry and also received many costly gifts from Anna.

=== Duchess of Courland ===
When her husband was made duke of Courland in 1737, she was decorated with the Order of Saint Catherine. She shared her husband's imprisonment in 1740 and returned with him to Courland in 1763, where she spent the rest of her life at the court in Mitau (Jelgava).

She is described as a good painter and textile artist, and she and her daughter embroidered a tapestry of silk which were displayed in the Jelgava Palace. She also published a book of religious German language poems, published in Moscow in 1777 entitled "Eine große Kreuzträgerin".

== Issue ==
- Peter von Biron (1724–1800)
- Hedwig Elizabeth von Biron (1727–1797)
- Karl Ernst (1728–1801)

== Sources ==
- "Ernst Johann von Biron/Benigna Gottliebe von Trotta gen. Treyden". Archived from the original on 29 September 2011.

| Preceded by Johanna Magdalene of Saxe-Weissenfels | Duchess consort of Courland; 1737–1740 and 1763-1769 | Succeeded by Caroline of Waldeck and Pyrmont |
