= Jeleniów, Lower Silesian Voivodeship =

Jeleniów
- Village
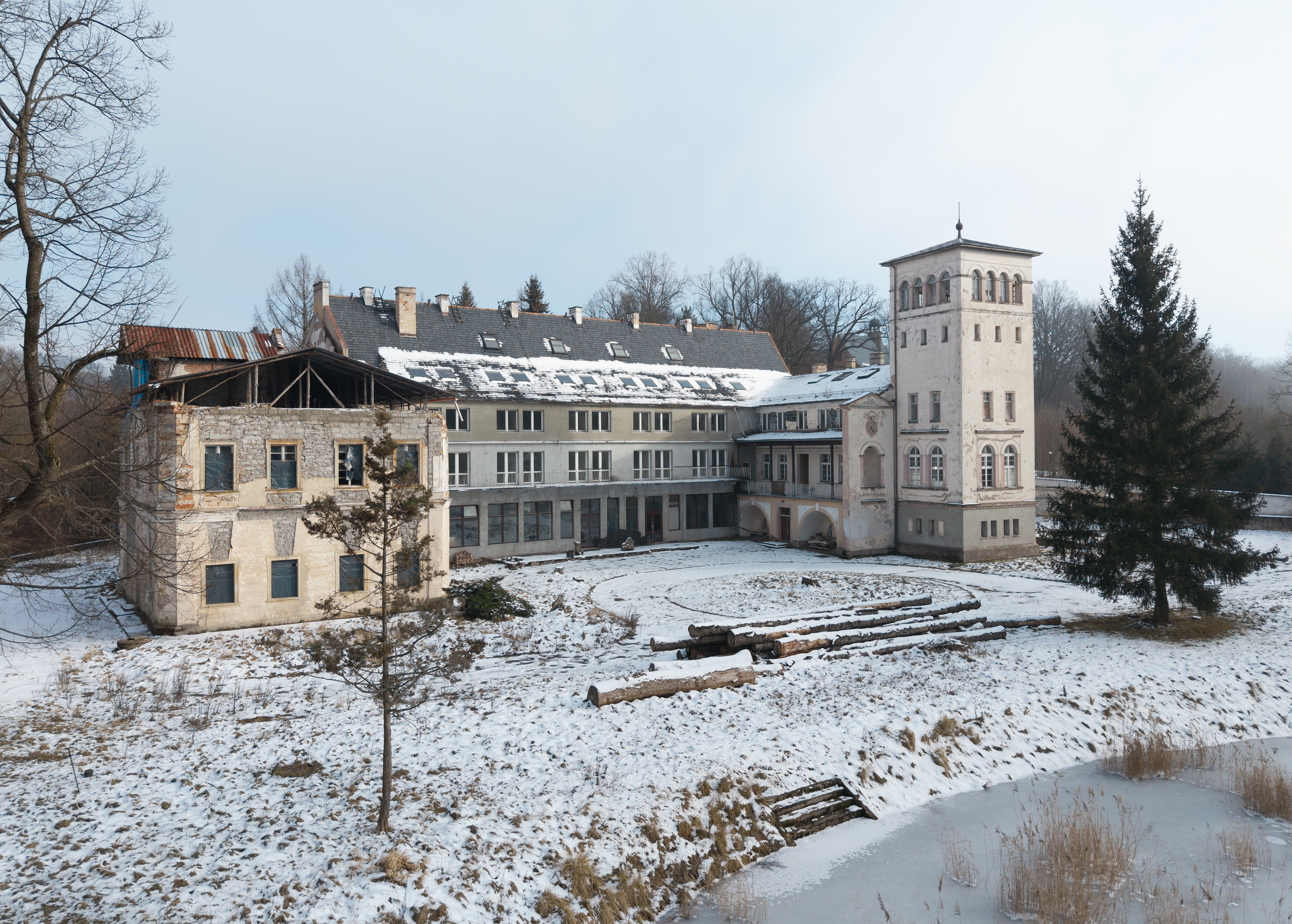

- Location within Poland
- Coordinates: 50°25′24″N 16°15′26″E
- Country: Poland
- Voivodeship: Lower Silesian
- County: Kłodzko
- Gmina: Lewin Kłodzki
- Population: 620

Jeleniów [jɛˈlɛɲuf] is a village in the administrative district of Gmina Lewin Kłodzki, within Kłodzko County, Lower Silesian Voivodeship, in south-western Poland.

Peter von Biron, last Duke of Courland and Semigallia died at Jeleniów Palace in 1800.
