= Grigory Dmitriyevich Yusupov =

Russian nobleman

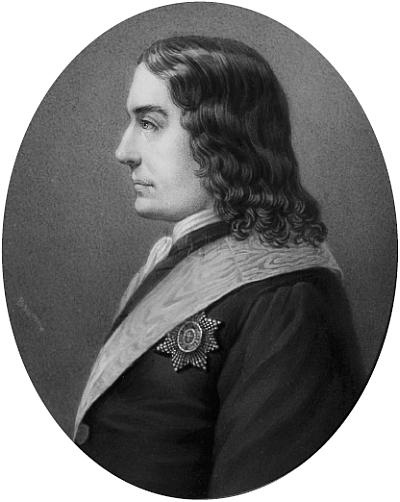

Prince Grigory Dmitriyevich Yusupov (17 (27) November 1676 - 2 (13) September 1730, Moscow) was a Russian nobleman and member of the Yusupov family. He was father of Boris Grigoryevich Yusupov.

== Life ==
Whilst still a child Feodor III of Russia granted him the title of stolnik. He was a childhood friend of the future Peter the Great. During the Russo-Turkish War (1686-1700) he fought with a cavalry regiment in both Azov campaigns and was promoted to captain by Peter I of Russia. He also fought in several battles of the Northern War, including one near Narva and was wounded in the right arm and left leg at the battle of Lesnaya in 1708. He then fought near Poltava and took part in the capture of the remainder of the Swedish army at Perevolochna (1709) as well as contributing to the capture of Vyborg in 1710.

He went to Poznan on the tsar's instructions in 1711 - there he was in charge of collecting and preparing army provisions. He took part in the unfortunate Prut campaign later that year before taking part in the Pomeranian and Holstein campaigns of Alexander Danilovich Menshikov, the capture of the Swedish general Magnus Stenbock and several sea battles.
