= Yevdokiya Yusupova =

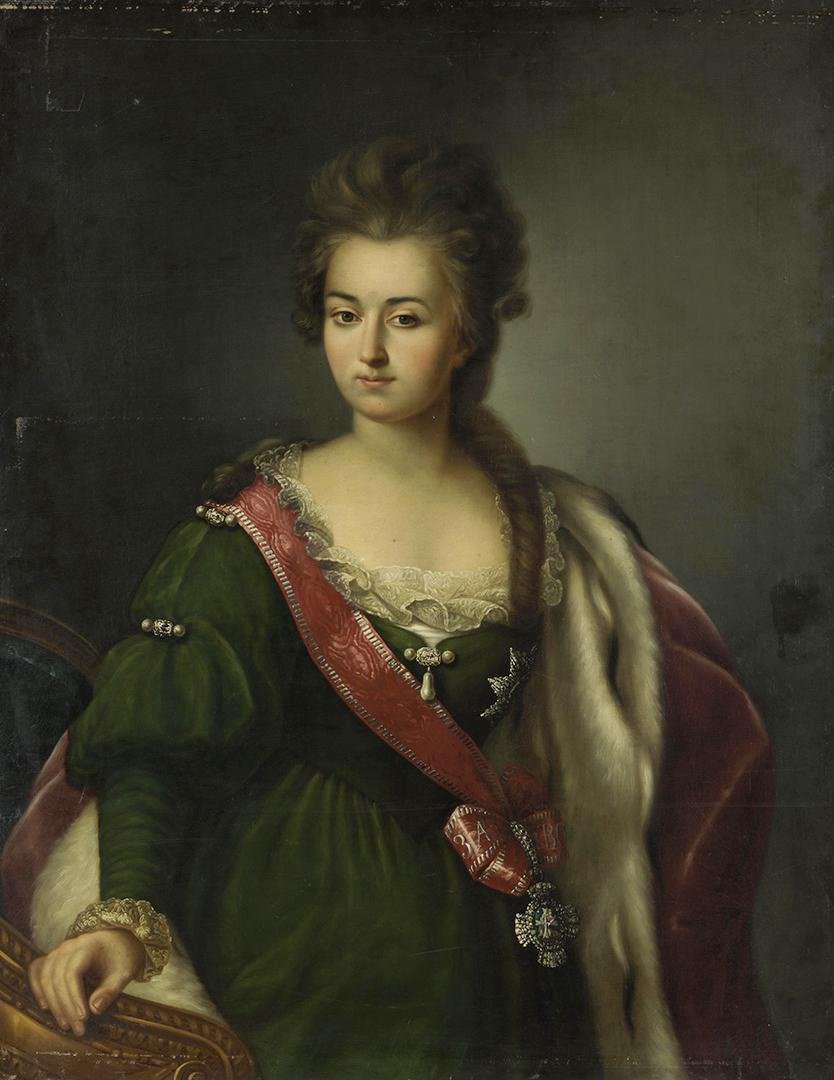

Duchess consort of Courland
- Tenure: 1774–1778
- Born: May 5 (NS: May 16) 1743; Moscow
- Died: July 21 (NS: July 8) 1780(aged 37); Saint Petersburg
- Spouse: Peter von Biron
- Issue: None
- House: Yusupov
- Father: Prince Boris Grigoryevich Yusupov
- Mother: Irina Mikhaylovna Zinovyeva

Princess Yevdokiya Borisovna Yusupova (Russian: Евдоки́я Бори́совна Юсу́пова; May 5 (NS: May 16) 1743, Moscow – July 19 (NS: July 8) 1780, Saint Petersburg), was a Duchess consort of Courland. She married the Duke of Courland, Peter von Biron, on March 6, 1774, in Mitau. She had no issue.

== Biography ==
Yevdokiya Yusupova was the eldest daughter of Prince Boris Grigoryevich Yusupov and Irina Mikhaylovna Zinovyeva. The marriage was arranged by empress Catherine II of Russia to secure a good relationship between Russia and Courland.

=== Courland ===
Duke Peter was described as wild, and Yevdokiya Yusupova was regarded as a beauty with spiritual qualities. She became popular among the nobility in Courland and did succeed in her task to recruit Pro-Russians among the Courland nobility. Initially, she also managed to wield some influence over Duke Peter.

The relationship between Yusupova and Peter soon deteriorated, however, and she wished to be freed from the abuse he is reported to have treated her with.

=== Later life ===
After having attended the wedding of Tsesarevich Paul to Maria Feodorovna (Sophie Dorothea of Württemberg) on 26 September 1776, she refused to return to Mitau. The divorce was issued on 27 April 1778.

Yevdokiya Yusupova received the order of St Catherine in 1777.

Preceded by Caroline of Waldeck and Pyrmont	Duchess consort of Courland; 1774–1778	Succeeded by Dorothea von Medem
