= Princess Wilhelmine, Duchess of Sagan =

Princess Wilhelmine
- Duchess of Sagan
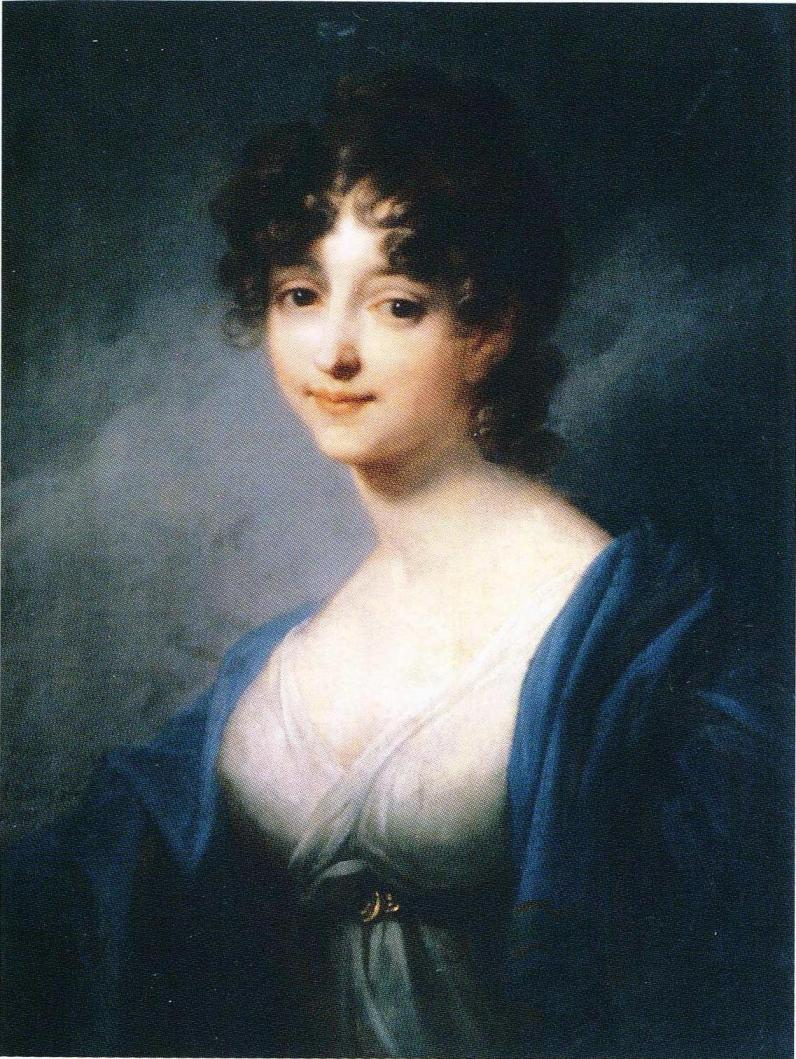
- Portrait by Joseph Maria Grassi, 1799
- Born: 8 February 1781; Mitau, Duchy of Courland and Semigallia
- Died: 29 November 1839 (aged 58); Vienna, Austrian Empire
- Spouse: Prince Louis de Rohan-Guémenée (m. 1800; div. 1805) Prince Vasily Troubetzkoy (m. 1805; div. 1806) Count Karl Rudolf von der Schulenburg (m. 1819; div. 1828)
- Issue: Adelaide Gustava Aspasie Armfelt (illegitimate)
Names
- Katharina Friederike Wilhelmine Benigna
- Father: Peter von Biron
- Mother: Dorothea von Medem
- Religion: Roman Catholic, prev. Lutheran

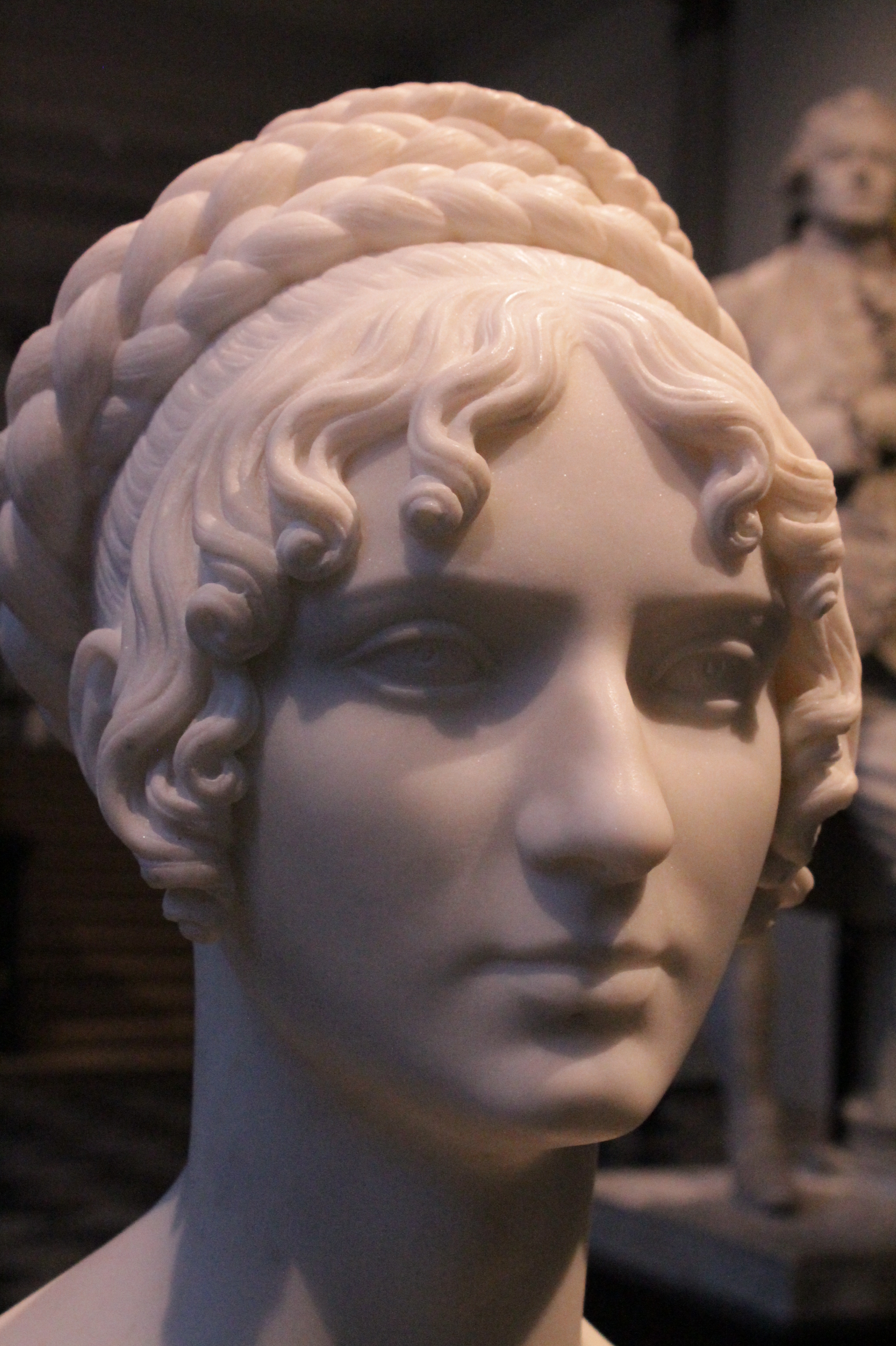
Princess Wilhelmine, Duchess of Sagan by Bertel Thorvaldsen 1818, Albertinum, Dresden

Katharina Friederike Wilhelmine Benigna, Princess of Courland, Duchess of Sagan (born 8 February 1781 in Mitau, Duchy of Courland and Semigallia); died 29 November 1839 in Vienna, Austrian Empire) was a German noble from the ruling family of Courland and Semigallia (today part of Latvia) and a Duchess of Sagan. Wilhelmine is mainly known for her relationship with Klemens Metternich, a statesman of the Austrian Empire.

French transcription of her name is Wilhelmine Catherine Frédérique Biron, Czech Kateřina Frederika Vilhelmína princezna Kuronská. Among the Czechs she is known as kněžna Kateřina Zaháňská (Zaháň is Czech name for Żagań).

== Early life ==
Wilhelmine was born to Peter von Biron, the last Duke of Courland, and his third wife Anna Charlotte Dorothea von Medem (1761–1821). She had three conjugal sisters: Maria Luise Pauline (1782–1845), Johanna Katharina (1783–1876), wife of Fürst Don Francesco, Duke of Acerenza (brother of the 8th Prince of Belmonte), and Dorothea (1793–1862), later wife of Edmond de Talleyrand-Périgord (1787–1872), nephew of the French statesman Talleyrand.

Wilhelmine spent her earliest childhood in Mitau. In 1795 the Duke was forced to cede his Duchy to the Russian Empire, and the family moved to the Duchy of Sagan (Żagań) in Silesia, which had been acquired in 1786. Among other properties bought by her father during the 1780s was County Náchod in Bohemia, which included Ratibořice Castle. Wilhelmine, who inherited both Sagan and Náchod, selected this castle as her summer residence.

The young duchess was very beautiful, intelligent, eloquent and educated in philosophy and history. She fell in love with Finnish-Swedish general Gustav Armfelt, her mother's lover and her tutor. The secret relationship with a much older and married Armfelt resulted in the birth of an illegitimate daughter named Adelaide Gustava Aspasia (nicknamed Vava), who was born in secrecy in Hamburg on 13 January 1801. The delivery was traumatic, and, due to an incompetent midwife, she lost the ability to have further children. Wilhelmine gave up her child to one of Armfelt's relatives in Finland and never saw her again. Wilhelmine greatly regretted this decision as time went on. To protect her reputation, Armfelt organized a marriage for her with an émigré French nobleman, Prince Louis de Rohan-Guémenée (1768–1836), the son of the Princesse de Guéméné, the original governess of the children of King Louis XVI. The marriage did not last and ended in divorce in 1805.

Wilhelmine spent the rest of her life moving between Vienna, Prague, Ratibořice and Sagan (Żagań). She also undertook journeys to Italy, England and France. Her second marriage with prince Vasily Troubetzkoy (1776–1841), which lasted from 1805 to 1806, also ended in divorce. In Vienna, she set up a salon attended by the highest nobility. An attractive woman, she attracted many aristocratic lovers. She had a short-lived and turbulent relationship during the spring of 1810 with Alfred I, Prince of Windisch-Grätz, an Austrian army commander.

== Metternich ==
Although Wilhelmine first met Prince Klemens Wenzel von Metternich (1773–1859) in 1801, their love affair did not start until the spring of 1813. The passion between the two is documented by over 600 letters written by Metternich that were discovered in 1949 by Marie Ulrichová in Plasy Monastery (the monastery building was purchased by v. Metternich in 1826). These letters also describe the minute details of the political situation of the day and the corresponding decisions made by Metternich as a diplomat and government official.

Modern historians speculate that Wilhelmine, who hated Napoleon, was the one who pushed Metternich away from a cautious pro-French position. The negotiations in 1813 that resulted in an anti-Napoleonic coalition between Prussia, Austria and Russia were held in one of Wilhelmine's homes, Ratibořice Castle.

During the Congress of Vienna (1814–15), the relationship ended, as Wilhelmine didn't like playing the role of an unacknowledged mistress, a role forced onto her as Metternich was married, and also because Alfred Windischgraetz (alternative spelling) appeared in Vienna, and she could not resist resuming her affair with him, writing "with friends one counts the days, with you I count the nights, and I would not wish to miss a single one of them". This distracted Metternich at a critical stage in the negotiations.

Because of the impossibility of having any more children, she became a foster parent to many young girls. From 1819 until 1828, Wihelmine was married to Prince Karl Rudolf von der Schulenburg (1788–1856). This marriage also ended in divorce. What she feared the most - being alone - eventually became reality toward the end of her life.

== Relation with Božena Němcová ==
Famous Czech author Božena Němcová (1820^{?}–1862) was one of the poor family girls supported by Wilhelmine. Němcová portrayed Wilhelmine in her 1855 novel Babička (The Grandmother) as an ideal woman. The portrait is so touching that Czech collocation "paní kněžna" (meaning "the princess") became a synonym for Wilhelmine.

All four Courland sisters are known to have had illegitimate children, Johanna at age sixteen. Because of her unknown origin (even the date of her birth is disputed) and the favour shown her by the duchess, several historians believe that Němcová could have been an illegitimate daughter of Wilhelmine and either Metternich, Count Karel Clam-Martinic or Windischgrätz.

Helena Sobková, a writer of popular-history books about Němcová, believes that Němcová may actually have been the niece of Wilhelmine. In 1816 an illegitimate daughter was born to Wilhelmine's younger sister, Dorothea, and Karel Clam-Martinic (1792–1840). The child's fate is unknown, and it is possible that Wilhelmine gave the child to Němcová's parents to raise as their own. This suggestion, however, has not been definitely proven.

== Literature ==
- Clemens Brühl: Die Sagan, das Leben der Herzogin von Sagan, Prinzessin von Kurland, Berlin, 1941, in German.
- Dorothy Gies McGuigan: Metternich and the duchess , 1975, ISBN 0-385-02827-X.
- Maria Ulrichová: Clemens Metternich – Wilhelmine von Sagan. Ein Briefwechsel 1813–1815, Graz - Köln, 1966. Published letters between Metternich and Wilhelmine, in German.
- Helena Sobková: Kateřina Zaháňská, Prague, 1995, ISBN 80-204-0532-1. Monograph about the duchess, based on thorough research of archives, in Czech.

Princess Wilhelmine, Duchess of Sagan House of Biron Born: 8 February 1781 Died: 29 November 1839
German nobility
Preceded by Peter von Biron	Duchess of Sagan; 13 January 1800 – 29 November 1839	Succeeded by Princess Pauline of Courland
