= Dorothea von Medem =

Duchess of Courland (1761–1821)

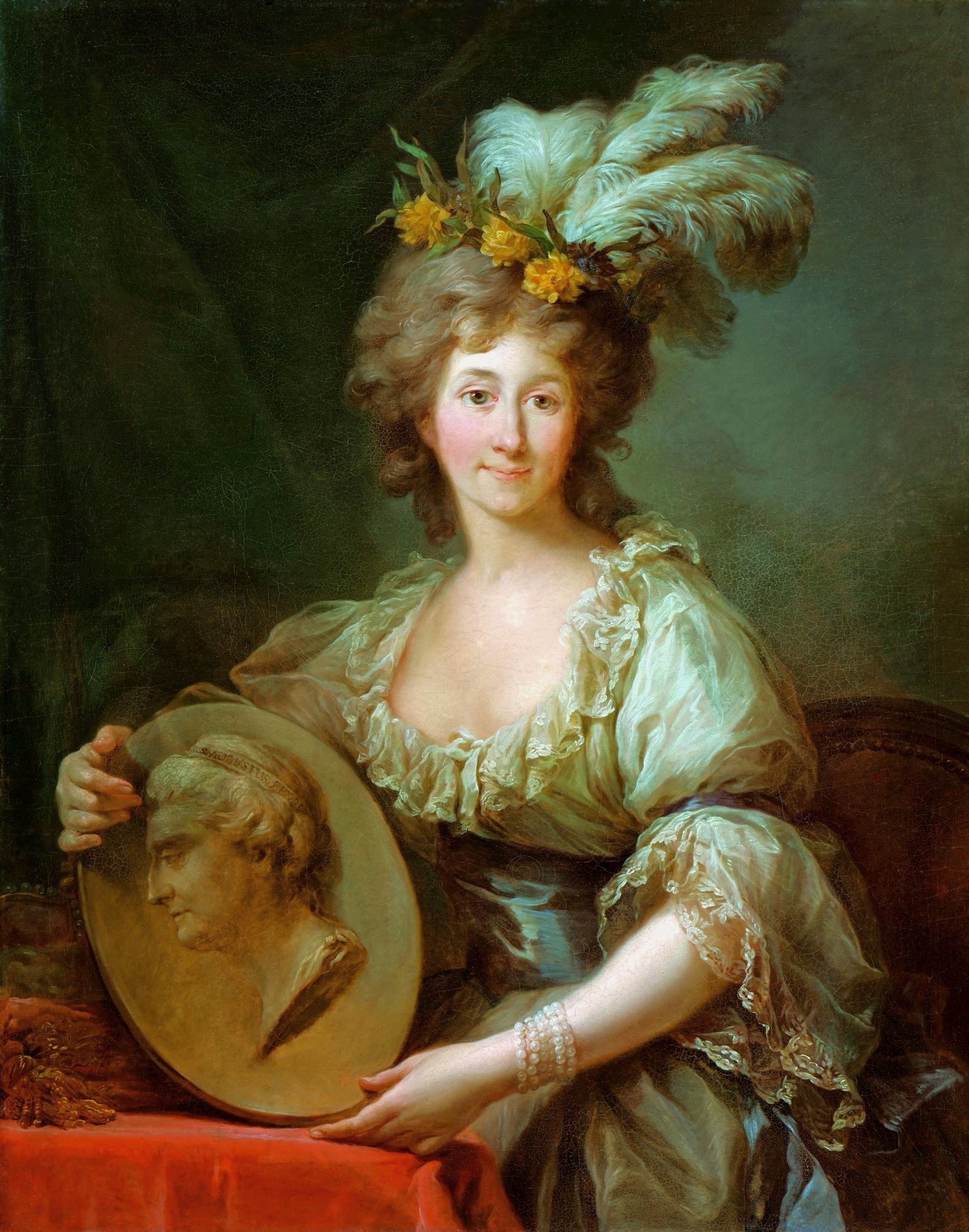
- Dorothea by Marcello Bacciarelli

Duchess consort of Courland
- Tenure: 6 November 1779 – 28 March 1795
- Born: 3 February 1761
- Died: 20 August 1821 (aged 60)
- Spouse: Peter von Biron
- Issue: Princess Wilhelmine, Duchess of Sagan; Princess Pauline, Duchess of Sagan; Princess Joanna, Duchess of Acerenza; Prince Peter; Princess Dorothea
- House: Medem
- Father: Friedrich von Medem
- Mother: Louise Charlotte von Manteuffel
- Religion: Lutheranism

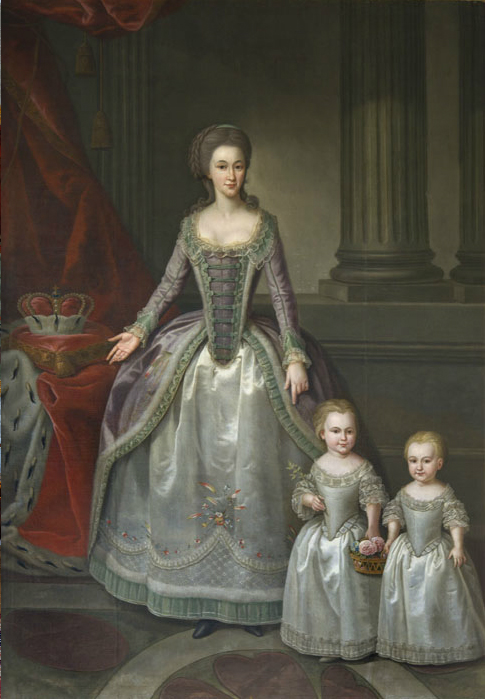
Duchess Dorothea of Courland and Semigallia with her two eldest daughters, Princess Wilhelmine and Princess Pauline

Countess Anna Charlotte Dorothea von Medem (3 February 1761 – 20 August 1821) was born a Gräfin (Countess) of the noble Baltic German Medem family and later became Duchess of Courland. Popularly known as Dorothea of Courland after her marriage to Peter von Biron, the last Duke of Courland, she hosted an aristocratic salon in Berlin and performed various diplomatic duties on behalf of her estranged husband. She would spend the rest of her life in her estate in Löbichgau, where she would invite and host many important political and cultural figures of the time. She made many acquaintances, ranging from Goethe to Napoleon I of France to Talleyrand, the latter of whom she was reportedly very close to.

== Biography ==
Anna Charlotte Dorothea was born at Mežotne to Johann Friedrich von Medem, a Graf from the old Courland nobility, general-poruchik of the Russian Empire, and (as of 1779) Reichsgraf of the Holy Roman Empire; and his second wife, Louise Charlotte von Manteuffel. Her father, a descendant of Konrad von Mandern, was himself awarded the Order of St. Alexander Nevsky in 1774 for his help in preparing the Treaty of Küçük Kaynarca. He owned many estates in Courland, including Elley and Alt-Autz. Her elder half-sister from her father's previous marriage was the poet Elisa von der Recke. Her younger brother was a Russian diplomat Christoph Johann von Medem, who built Villa Medem in Mitau (now Jelgava).

=== Duchess of Courland ===
On 6 November 1779, eighteen-year-old Dorothea became the third wife of the 55-year-old, childless Duke Peter von Biron, son of the famous Ernst Johann von Biron. The couple had six children, two of whom died in infancy. The four surviving children were all daughters. However, the youngest one, Dorothea, was probably not fathered by the Duke, but was recognized by him.

Dorothea was welcomed into the highest social circles thanks to her new status as duchess as well as her beauty. Because her husband was preoccupied with political difficulties at home involving his overlord the King of Poland and the Courland nobility, he frequently sent her on diplomatic missions to Warsaw, lasting months at a time, and to Berlin, Karlovy Vary, and Saint Petersburg for shorter periods. During these long absences, Dorothea became alienated from her husband and had numerous love affairs with other men, including Gustaf Mauritz Armfelt, Talleyrand, and the Polish nobleman Count Alexander Benedykt Batowski, who allegedly fathered her fourth daughter, born in 1793. After she gave birth to her daughter, also named Dorothea, the Duchess moved permanently to the Palais Kurland in Berlin, where she held an aristocratic salon.

=== Later life ===
In 1794, she acquired the Gutsherrschaft Löbichau in Altenburgischen and spent her summers at the newly built Schloss there. Inviting poets, philosophers, relatives and friends to Löbichau, it became known as the Musenhof der Herzogin von Kurland. Her half-sister Elisa von der Recke, who would later be linked with Christoph August Tiedge, came to Löbichau to live; and Tsar Alexander I of Russia, Frederick William III of Prussia, Napoleon I of France, Talleyrand, Metternich, Goethe, Schiller and other personalities of the time were the duchess's personal friends. In 1801, she received a proposal from Prince Frederick Adolf of Sweden.

Upon her youngest daughter Dorothea's marriage to Talleyrand's nephew Edmond de Talleyrand-Périgord in 1809, the duchess moved to Paris, having an intense relationship with Talleyrand and influencing him to turn against Napoleon. In 1814, she traveled to the Congress of Vienna to confront him about his alleged love affair with her daughter Dorothea. A few years after her death at Löbichau in 1821, the Duchess's body was moved from her place of death to the family vault at Sagan, where her husband was buried in 1800.

== Issue ==
With Peter von Biron:

- Wilhelmine (8 February 1781 – 29 November 1839), Duchess of Sagan, Princess of Rohan, Princess Trubetskoy, Countess von der Schulenburg, mistress of Klemens Wenzel, Prince von Metternich;
- Pauline (19 February 1782 – 8 January 1845), Duchess of Sagan and Princess of Hohenzollern-Hechingen;
- Johanna (24 June 1783 – 11 April 1876), Duchess of Acerenza;
- Peter (23 February 1787 – 25 March 1790);
- Charlotte (21 January 1789 – 10 March 1791).

With Count Alexander Batowski, although legally recognized by Duke Peter von Biron as his own daughter:

- Dorothea (21 August 1793 – 19 September 1862), Duchess of Talleyrand-Périgord, Duchess of Dino, Duchess of Sagan, protégé (and alleged mistress) of Talleyrand and wife of his nephew the 2nd Duke of Talleyrand.

== Gallery ==
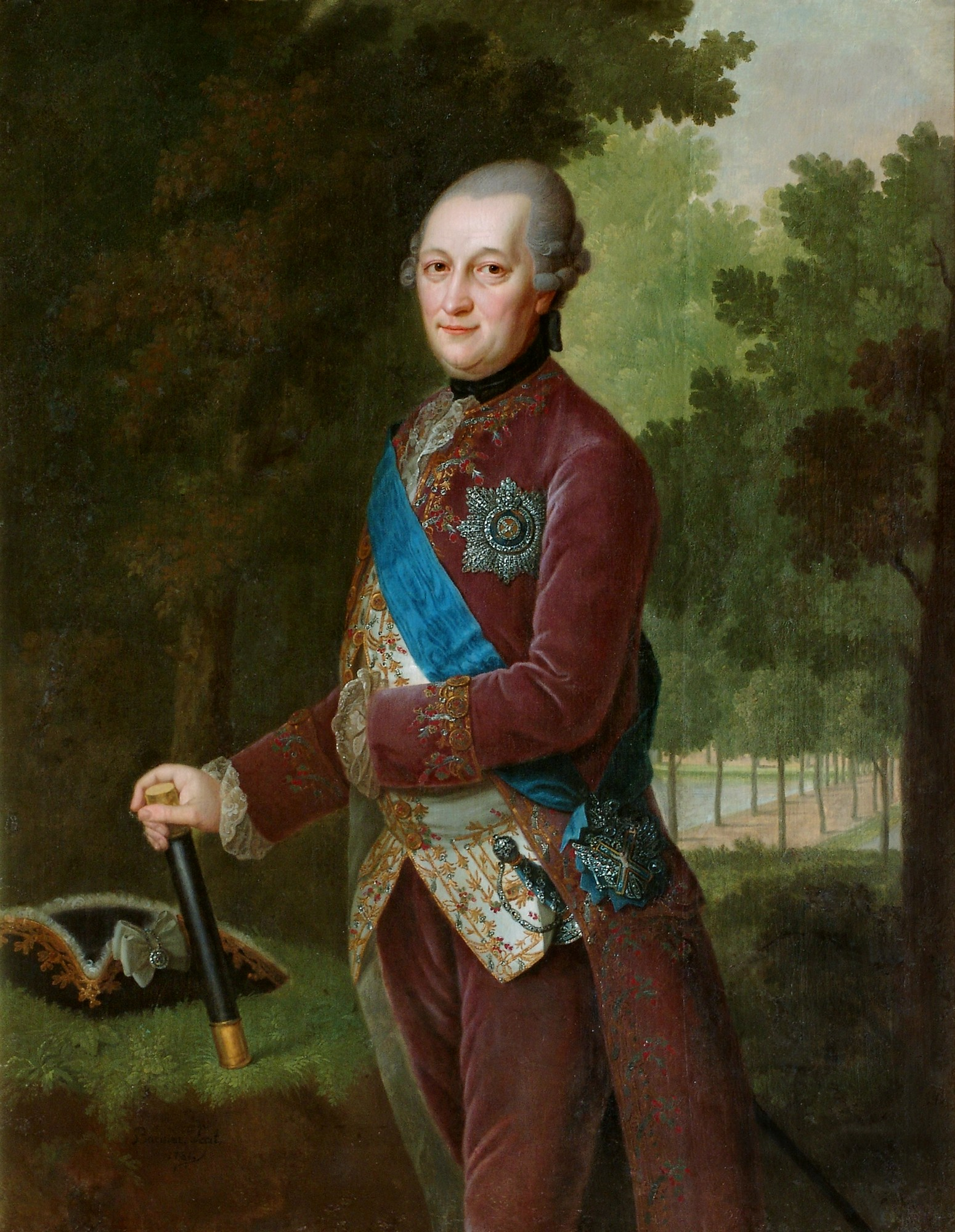
Her husband, Peter von Biron

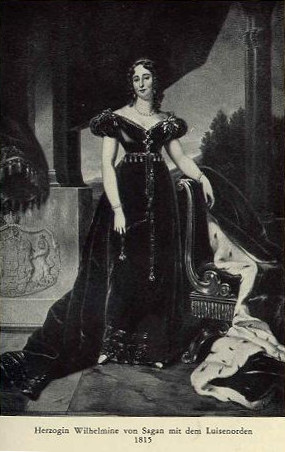
Her eldest daughter, Wilhelmine

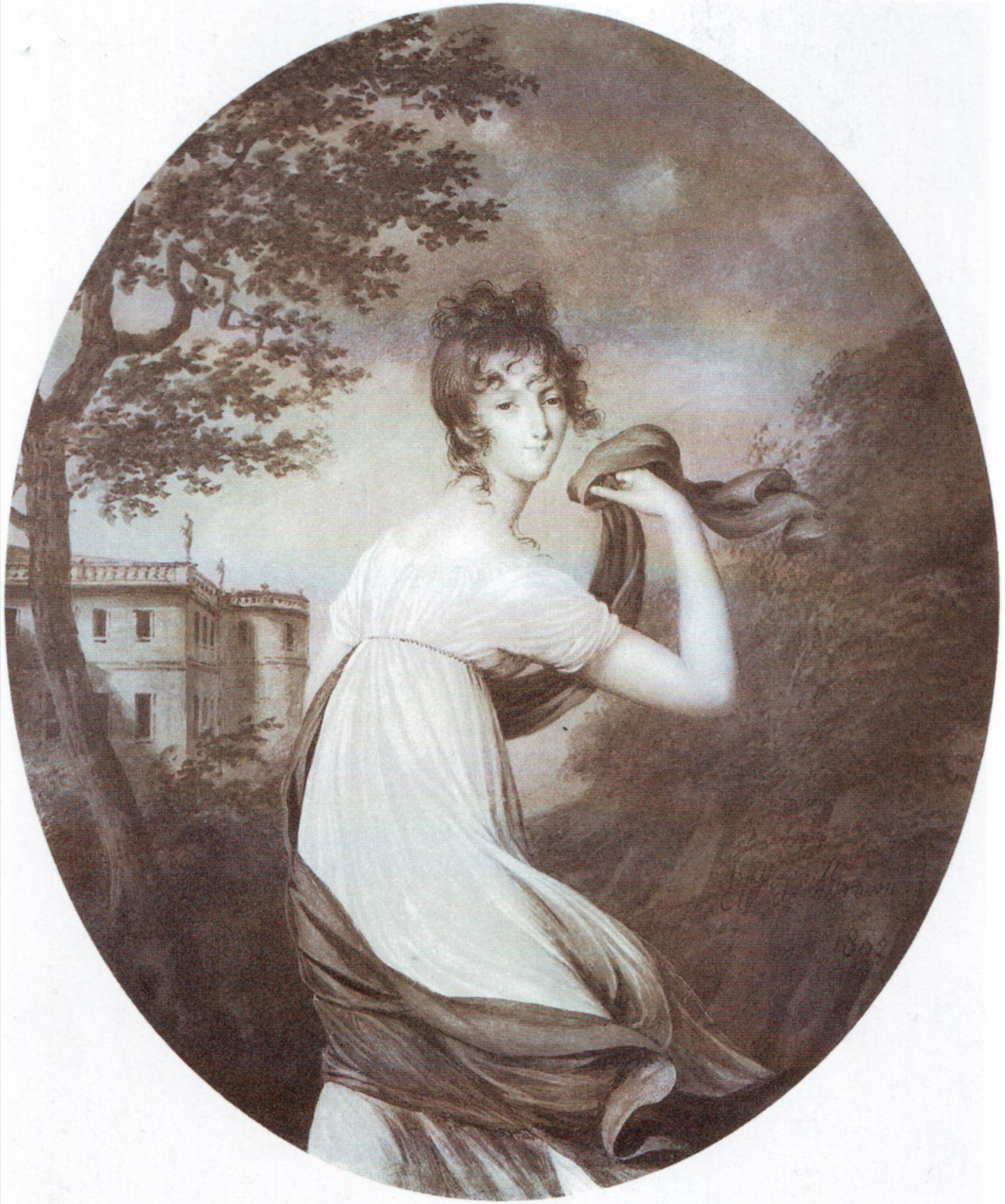
Her second daughter, Pauline

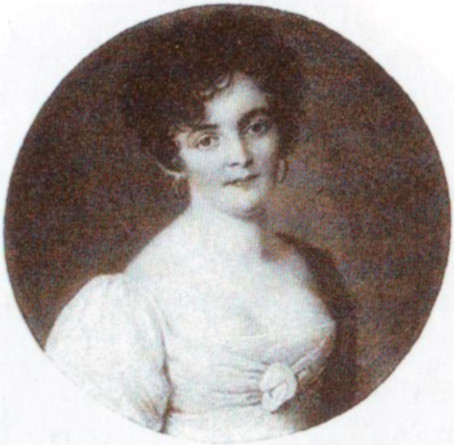
Her third daughter, Johanna

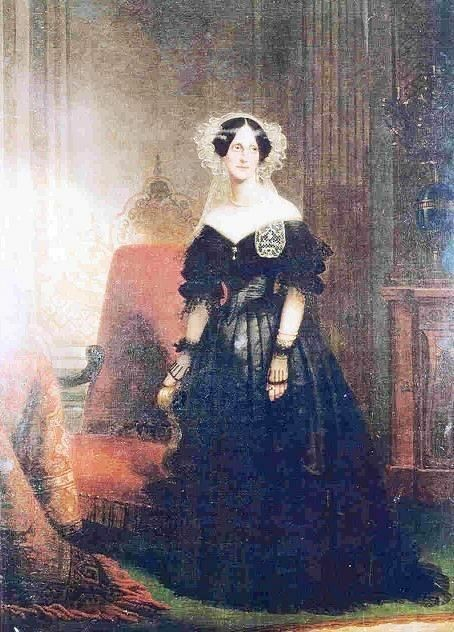
Her fourth daughter, Dorothea

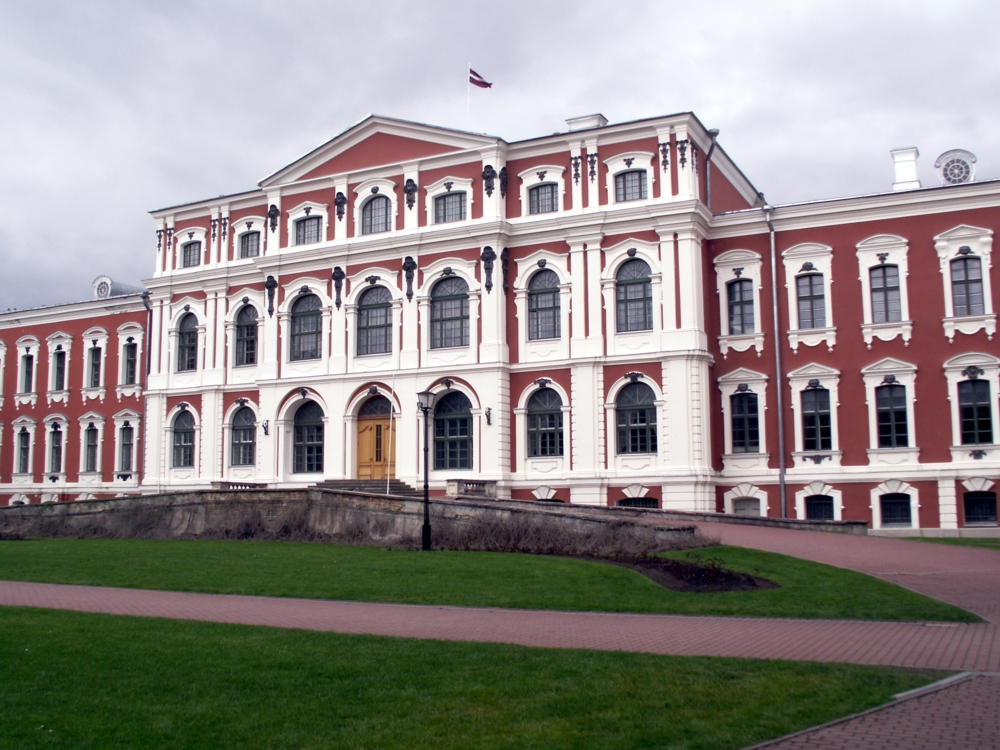
Jelgava Palace, the Biron residence

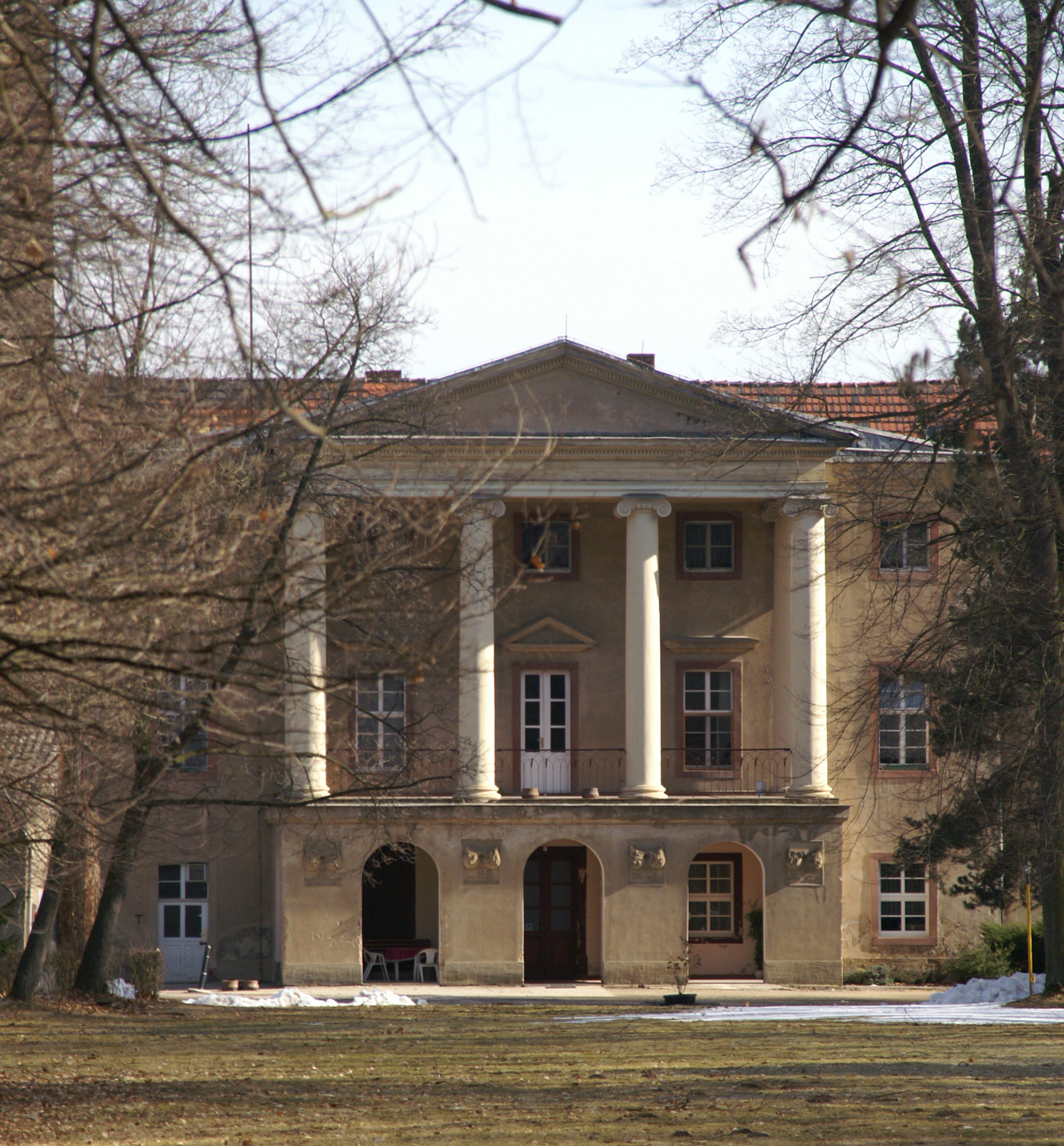
Her beloved Schloss Löbichau

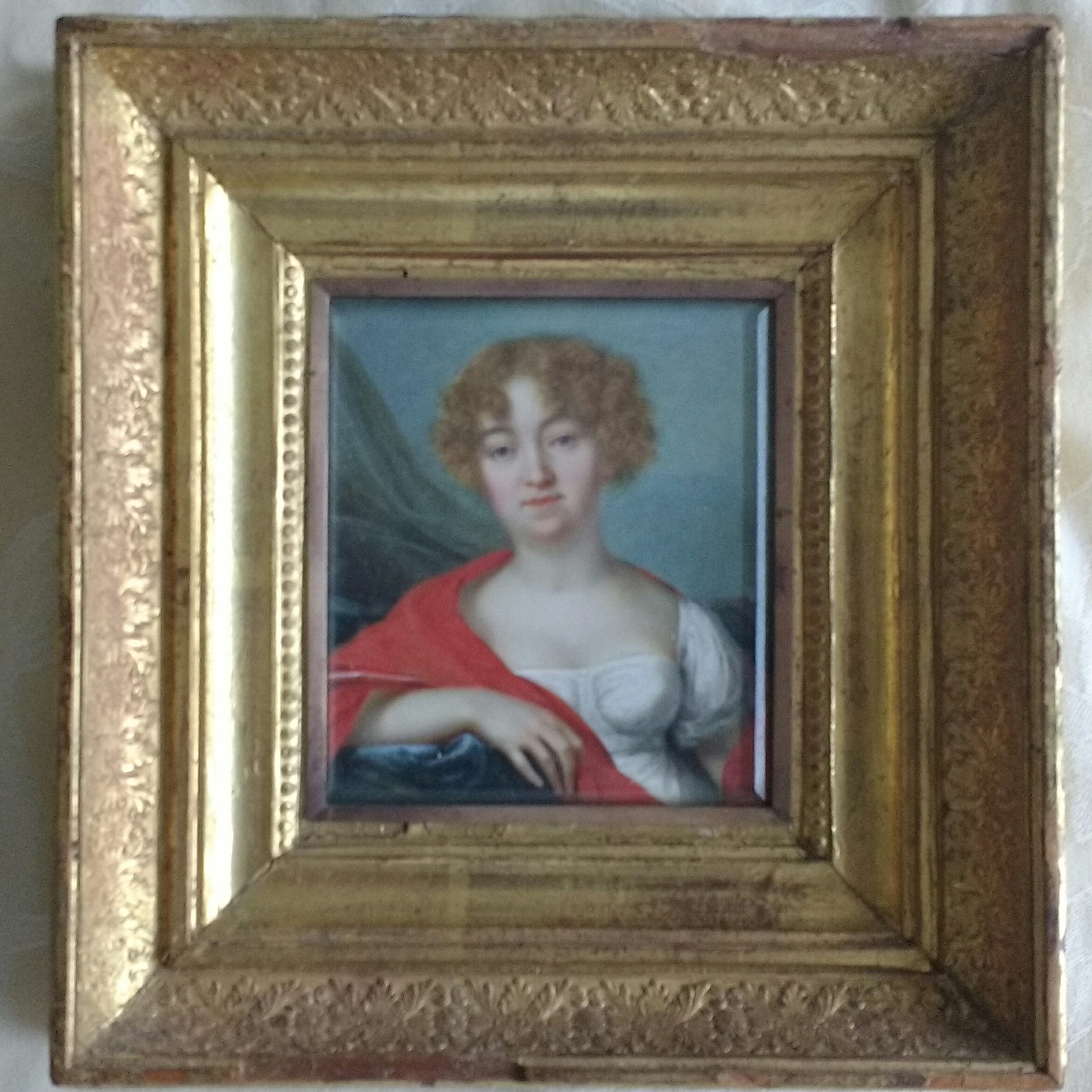
Miniature portrait titled: Wilhelmine von Mengden [...] Grafin Medem [...] 1792

== Bibliography ==
- Elisa von der Recke: Tagebücher und Selbstzeugnisse. Leipzig 1984
- Emilie von Binzer: Drei Sommer in Löbichau 1819–21. Stuttgart 1877
- Philip Ziegler: Die Herzogin von Dino, Talleyrands letzte Vertraute. München 1965
- Clemens Brühl: Die Sagan. Berlin 1941
- Sabine und Klaus Hofmann: Zwischen Metternich und Talleyrand. Der Musenhof der Herzogin von Kurland im Schloss zu Löbichau. Museum Burg Posterstein, 2004
- Christoph August Tiedge: Anna Charlotte Dorothea. Letzte Herzogin von Kurland. F. A. Brockhaus, Leipzig 1823 Online-Version at Internet Archive
