= Friedrich Hartmann Barisien =

Baltic German painter (1724–1796)

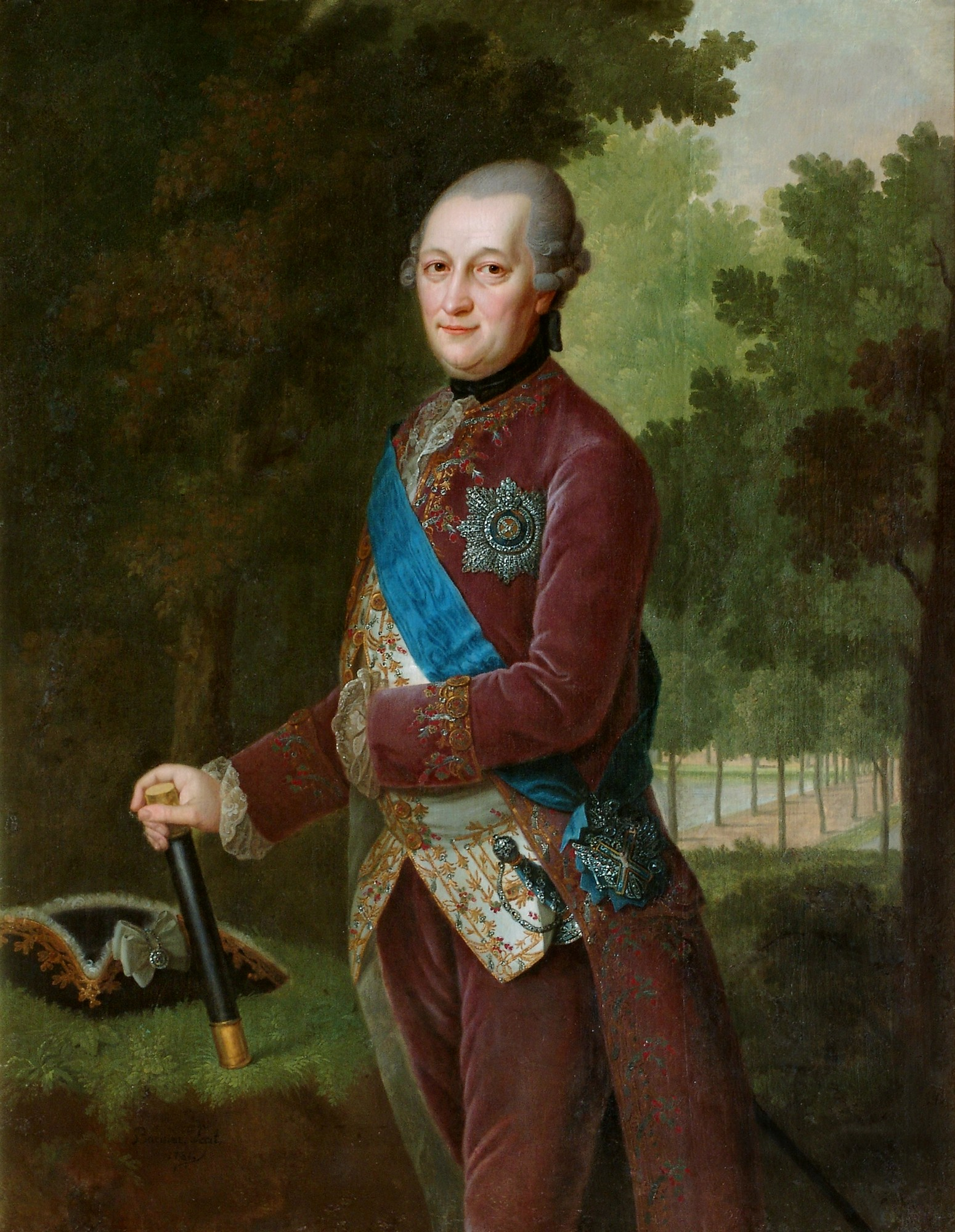
Friedrich Hartmann Barisien: portrait of Peter von Biron

Friedrich Hartmann Barisien (13 February 1724 – 19 August 1796) was a Baltic German portrait painter, mostly active in present-day Latvia.

== Life ==
He was born in Coburg in present-day Germany. His father was a blacksmith. His grandfather had immigrated from France using the name Parisius or Parisien, i.e. "from Paris", hence the surname of the family. Friedrich Hartmann Barisien was originally supposed to follow in the footsteps of his father, but instead began studying art in Dresden. There he met a Russian nobleman who invited him to Astrakhan, where he moved in 1750. In 1767 he moved to Riga and in 1770 he entered into service of the Duke of Courland and Semigallia, Peter von Biron, as a court painter. In 1786 he was bestowed the title of "Academy painter" by the Imperial Academy of Arts in Saint Petersburg. His oeuvre consists mainly of portraits of members of the upper classes of Courland. He also made theatre decorations and ceiling paintings for Jelgava Palace (lost) and Rundale Palace.

Friedrich Hartmann Barisien's two sons Hartmann Johann (1770–1845) and Friedrich Gottlieb (1776–1848) were active in Courland as drawing teachers and musicians. Friedrich Hartmann Barisien died in Jelgava.
