= Princess Dorothea of Courland =

Baltic-German noblewoman (1793–1862)

Princess Dorothea
- Duchess of Dino, Duchess of Talleyrand, Duchess of Sagan
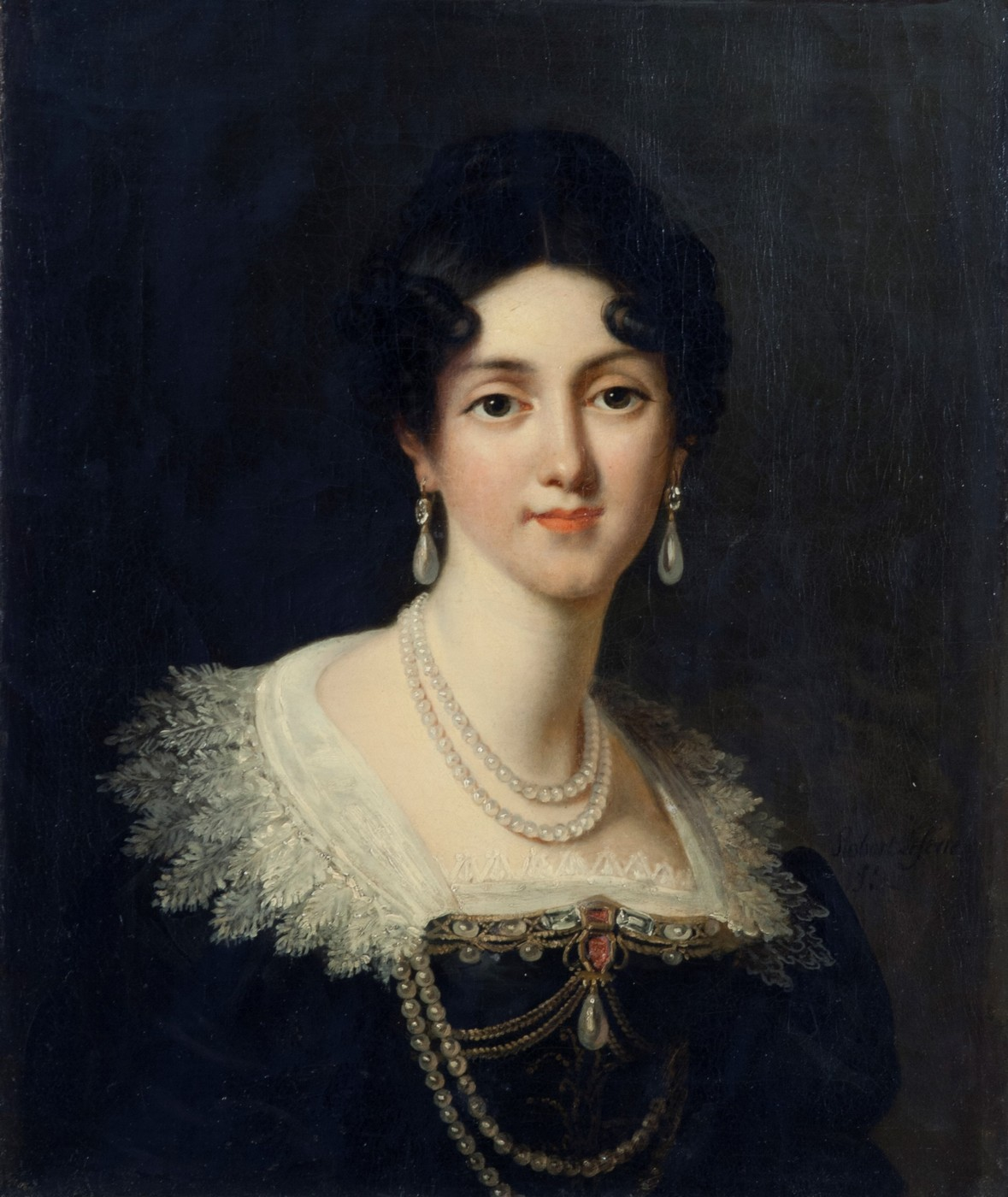
- Portrait by Robert Lefèvre, 1815
- Born: 21 August 1793
- Died: 19 September 1862 (aged 69)
- Spouse: Edmond de Talleyrand-Périgord (m. 1809; sep. 1818)
- Issue: Napoléon Louis de Talleyrand-Périgord; Dorothée de Talleyrand-Périgord; Alexandre Edmond de Talleyrand-Périgord; Pauline de Talleyrand-Périgord
- Father: Peter von Biron (official); Count Aleksander Batowski [pl] (biological)
- Mother: Dorothea von Medem
- Religion: Catholic, prev. Lutheran

Dorothea von Biron, Princess of Courland, Duchess of Dino, Duchess of Talleyrand and Duchess of Sagan, known as Dorothée de Courlande or Dorothée de Dino (21 August 1793 – 19 September 1862), was a Baltic German noblewoman, and the ruling Duchess of Sagan between 1845 and 1862. Her mother was Dorothea von Medem, Duchess of Courland, and although her mother's husband, Duke Peter von Biron, acknowledged her as his own, her true father may have been the Polish statesman Count Aleksander Batowski [pl]. For a long time, she accompanied the French statesman Charles Maurice de Talleyrand-Périgord; she was the separated wife of his nephew, Edmond de Talleyrand-Périgord.

== Life ==
Dorothea was born in Friedrichsfelde Palace near Berlin, the fourth and last daughter of Duchess Dorothea of Courland, who was by then separated from her husband, Duke Peter of Courland. Dorothea's paternity is disputed but generally assigned to Count Aleksander Batowski [pl], a Polish envoy to the Duchy of Courland. Her biological father was a close associate of her uncle Charles-Maurice de Talleyrand-Périgord during the Napoleonic period. Her three elder half sisters, all legitimate daughters of the Duke of Courland, were Princess Wilhelmine, Duchess of Sagan, Princess Pauline, Duchess of Sagan, and Princess Johanna, Duchess of Acerenza. The Duke of Courland acknowledged her officially, which entitled her to be styled Princess of Courland. She was educated in Germany.

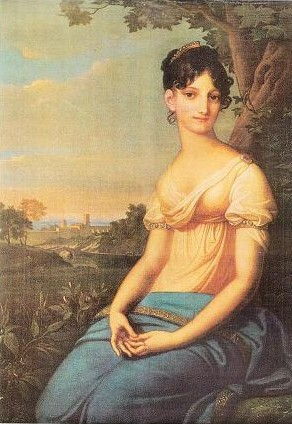
Princess Dorothea, c. 1810 (aged 17)

=== Marriage ===
Looking for a wealthy heiress for his nephew Edmond, Talleyrand asked Tsar Alexander I of Russia to intervene with Dorothea's mother in favor of Edmond's marrying her. The marriage occurred on 21 and 22 April 1809 at Frankfurt amidst the Napoleonic Wars, presided over by Talleyrand's friend, Prince-Bishop Karl Theodor Anton Maria von Dalberg. Dorothea became a member of the old French House of Talleyrand-Périgord. After the marriage she was known as Comtesse Edmond de Talleyrand-Périgord and became great-niece by marriage of Count Charles Maurice de Talleyrand-Périgord, Prince of Bénévent. Educated in Germany, she was plunged into French society, where she represented the enemy. Her three sisters, also very anti-French, did not help her marriage; and despite the birth of three children, the marriage became unhappy, with Edmond more concerned with gaming, war and other women than with his wife.

The fall of the First French Empire and the Congress of Vienna, at which Charles-Maurice de Talleyrand was designated to represent France, favoured a close friendship between him and Dorothea. During his time in Vienna, she kept her household in the Palais Kaunitz, and it was at this time that Dorothea began to play a major part in Charles-Maurice's life. She accompanied him to the Congress of Vienna, and it is even alleged that she became his mistress sometime after 1815. On 31 August 1817, Talleyrand was made a duke and peer of France by Louis XVIII, and on 2 December he was also granted the duchy of Dino (a 1.5 km by 1.2 km Calabrian island) by the King of the Two Sicilies in recognition of his services at Vienna. The duchy of Dino was immediately handed down to his nephew and his wife, and Dorothea also became duchess of Dino. On 24 March 1818 she and her husband separated, though this was only pronounced formally on 6 November 1824.

=== Her life with Talleyrand ===
On 3 July 1820 Talleyrand left Paris for Valençay accompanied by Dorothea, then pregnant with her third child, Pauline, whose paternity is sometimes attributed to Talleyrand. Despite having been his companion (he was 39 years her senior) she took several lovers, gaining a reputation as a formidable seductress and bearing three illegitimate daughters. One, born in 1816, was perhaps Božena Němcová, the great Czech writer, fathered by Count Karel Jan Clam Martinic, her lover at the Congress of Vienna; the two others, Julie Zulmé and Antonine Piscatory, were born in 1826 and 1827.

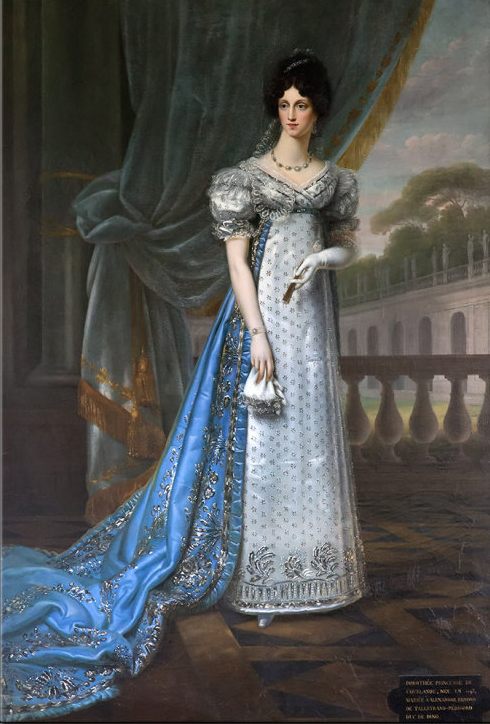
Dorothée, duchesse de Dino, c. 1830

When Talleyrand became French ambassador in London in 1830, she accompanied him and felt more comfortable there than in Paris, which she detested and where the whole Faubourg Saint-Germain made her feel she was a foreigner. This was a theme throughout her life: in Prussia she was seen as too French, in Paris as too German. She became duchess of Talleyrand on 28 April 1838.

=== Duchess of Sagan ===
On 6 (or 8) January 1845, the king of Prussia invested Dorothea as duchess of Sagan (with the special privilege of the dukedom being able to descend via the female as well as the male line), with her son Louis-Napoléon, godson of Napoleon and Louis-Napoléon's grandson Boson de Talleyrand-Périgord immediately taking the title of prince of Sagan.

She granted her Château de Rochecotte to her daughter Pauline de Castellane in 1847, having chosen in 1843 to live in state at her castle at Sagan in Silesia (made up of 130 buildings on an estate of 1,200 hectares, bought by her father and then by her sister Pauline de Hohenzollern). She reigned over this immense and rich duchy alone, until she had a carriage accident in June 1861 and died on 19 September 1862 at Sagan.

Despite the wish she had expressed to her uncle Talleyrand in a letter of April 1838 and in her will, that her heart should be placed in his grave at Valençay, she was buried in the Kreuzkirche at Sagan, with her sister Wilhelmine and son Napoléon Louis.

== Issue ==
=== With Edmond de Talleyrand-Périgord ===
- Napoléon Louis de Talleyrand-Périgord, 3rd Duke of Talleyrand
  - March 12, 1811 – March 21, 1898
  - married Anne Louise Charlotte de Montmorency on February 26, 1829 at Paris
- Dorothée Charlotte Emilie de Talleyrand-Périgord
  - April 9, 1812 – May 10, 1814
- Alexandre Edmond de Talleyrand-Périgord, 3rd Duke of Dino
  - December 15, 1813, Paris – April 9, 1894, Florence
  - married Valentine de Sainte-Aldegonde on October 8, 1839 at Beauregard
- Pauline Josephine de Talleyrand-Périgord
  - December 29, 1820, Paris – October 10, 1890, Saint-Patrice, Indre-et-Loire
  - married Henri de Castellane on April 10, 1839 at Paris

=== With Karel Jan Count of Clam-Martinic ===
- Marie-Henriette Dessalles
  - September 15, 1816, Bourbon-l'Archambault – ?

=== Unknown paternity ===
- Julie Zulmé
  - January 23, 1826, Toulon – August 4, 1913, Marseille.
  - married Joseph Evarist Laurent Bertulus, Dr. of the National Marine.

=== With Théobald Emile Arcambal-Piscatory ===
- Antonine Arcambal-Piscatory
  - September 10, 1827, Bourdeaux – d. January 21, 1908, La Fleche.
  - married Octave Auvity, Knight of the Legion of Honour.

== Reception ==
"ith large dark blue eyes, very beautiful, so burning that they appeared black to some people. There was in her something bold, wild, dauntless and burning one which held the gaze".

The opinions she inspired are various; those of men, admiring her beauty and intelligence, praise her, but those of women, jealous of her position and wealth, are more venomous. It is strange that she had no close female friends but instead was a solitary figure, despite keeping up a wide correspondence with many personalities of her era. She was a true European, in an era where that word was unknown. Born between two cultures, speaking three languages, in contact with all the political personalities of Europe, she could have been, in another era, thanks to her intelligence, a scholar or politician. But in that era, only men had a career, and so she was unable to realize her numerous talents. As Guizot said of her: "une personne rare et grande". Greville noted in his diary on 20 September 1831 that Talleyrand described her as “the cleverest man or woman he ever knew”.

The duchess of Dino also has a descendant in Touraine, a "calm and human region, of a pure, very poetic beauty", in the person of Béatrice de Andia, one of her great-great-great granddaughters, president of the association of the "Friends of Château d'Azay-le-Rideau", owner of Château de La Chatonnière.

== Styles ==
- 1809–1817: Comtesse Edmond de Périgord (while entitled as a princess of Courland to be styled Her Serene Highness, she never used that style in France).
- 1817–1838 : Madame la Duchesse de Dino
- 1838–1845 : Madame la Duchesse de Talleyrand
- 1845: Her Serene Highness The Duchess of Sagan, now Żagań, Poland

== Properties ==
- Château de Bouges (Indre), bought for her in 1818 by Charles-Maurice de Talleyrand-Périgord.
- Château de Rochecotte (Indre-et-Loire), overlooking the Loire valley, bought by her 30 April 1828, rebuilt by her. She wrote of it "He took me away from these deep and melancholy regrets to this soft and tranquil Rochecotte" ("Il me prend des profonds et mélancoliques regrets pour ce doux et tranquille Rochecotte..." - letter of 1862).
- Château de Sagan (Lower Silesia, now Żagań in Poland), bought in 1843 by her elder sister, Pauline, princess of Hohenzollern-Hechingen.
- Château de Günthersdorf (Lower Silesia, today Zatonie in Poland), bought in 1840.

== Memoirs ==
- Dorothée, princesse de Courlande, duchesse de Dino, Mémoires . Tome I, 1794–1808 : souvenirs d'enfance de la princesse de Courlande (texte établi par Clémence Muller). – Clermont-Ferrand : Paleo, coll. « Sources de l'histoire de France », 2003. – 173 p., 21 cm. – ISBN 2-84909-022-0.

Chronologically:

  - Mémoires. Tome II, 1831–1834 (texte établi par Clémence Muller). – Clermont-Ferrand : Paleo, coll. « Sources de l'histoire de France », 2003. – 258 p., 21 cm. – ISBN 2-84909-039-5.
  - Mémoires . Tome III, 1835–1837 (texte établi par Clémence Muller). – Clermont-Ferrand : Paleo, coll. « Sources de l'histoire de France », 2004. – 228 p., 21 cm. – ISBN 2-84909-065-4.
  - Mémoires . Tome IV, 1838–1840 (texte établi par Clémence Muller). – Clermont-Ferrand : Paleo, coll. « Sources de l'histoire de France », 2004. – 243 p., 21 cm. – ISBN 2-84909-071-9.
  - Mémoires . Tome V, 1840–1843 (texte établi par Clémence Muller). – Clermont-Ferrand : Paleo, coll. « Sources de l'histoire de France », 2004. – 244 p., 21 cm. – ISBN 2-84909-092-1.
  - Mémoires . Tome VI, 1844–1853 (texte établi par Clémence Muller). – Clermont-Ferrand : Paleo, coll. « Sources de l'histoire de France », 2004. – 220 p., 21 cm. – ISBN 2-84909-109-X.
  - Mémoires . Tome VII, 1854–1862 (texte établi par Clémence Muller). – Clermont-Ferrand : Paleo, coll. « Sources de l'histoire de France », 2004. – 203 p., 21 cm. – ISBN 2-84909-112-X.

== See also ==
- House of Talleyrand-Périgord

== Notes ==
| Preceded by Princess Pauline of Courland | Duchess of Sagan; 8 January 1845 – 19 September 1862 | Succeeded by Napoléon Louis de Talleyrand-Périgord |
