= Princess Pauline, Duchess of Sagan =

Princess Pauline
- Princess of Hohenzollern-Hechingen; Duchess of Sagan
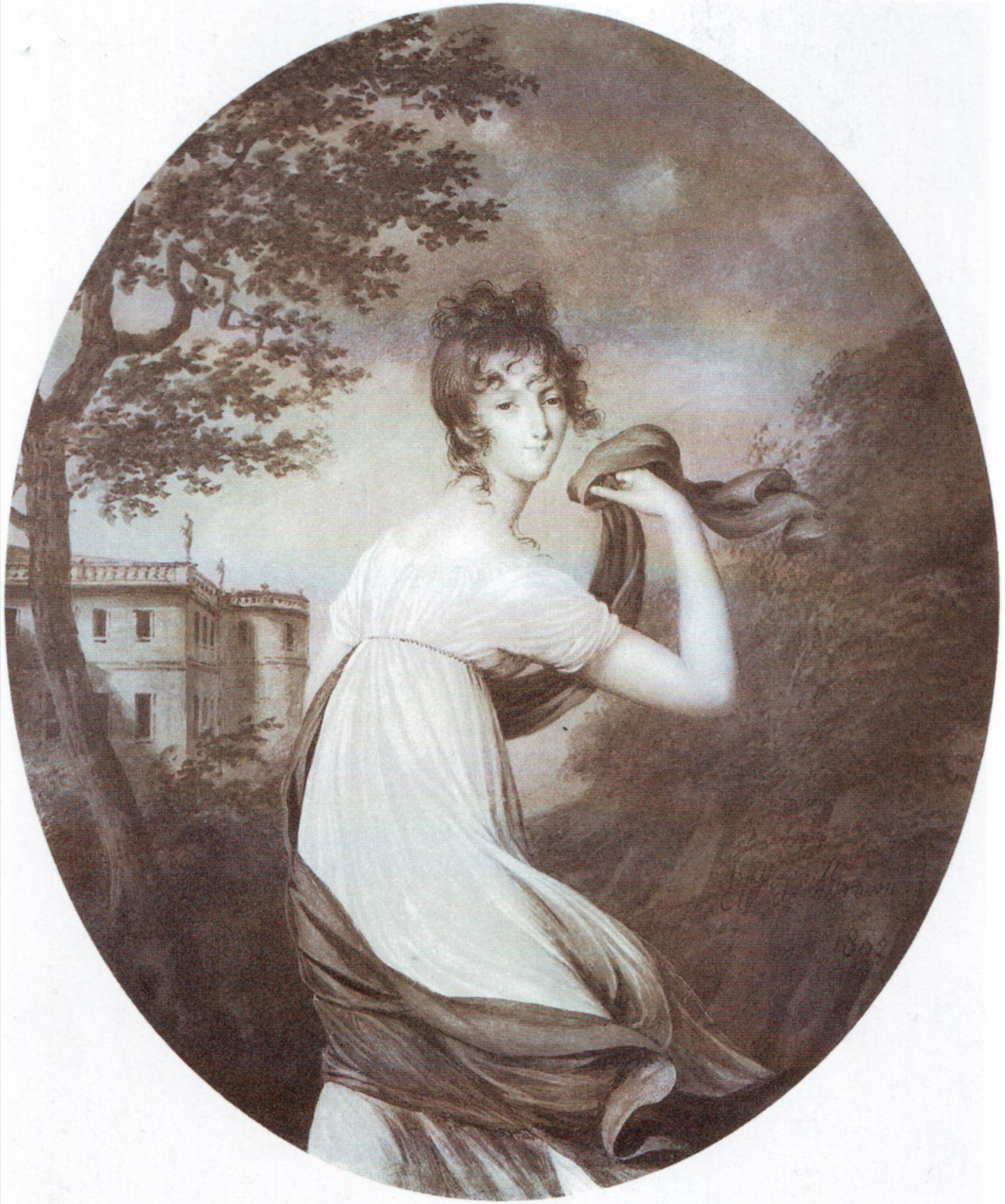
- Princess Pauline, 1802
- Reign: 2 November 1810 – 13 September 1838
- Born: 19 February 1782; Mitau, Duchy of Courland and Semigallia
- Died: 8 January 1845 (aged 62); Vienna, Austrian Empire
- Spouse: Friedrich Hermann Otto, Prince of Hohenzollern-Hechingen
- Issue: Constantine, Prince of Hohenzollern-Hechingen
Names
- Luise Pauline Maria Biron
- House: House of Hohenzollern-Hechingen
- Father: Peter von Biron
- Mother: Dorothea von Medem

Luise Pauline Maria Biron, Princess of Courland, Duchess of Sagan (19 February 1782 – 8 January 1845) was the Duchess Regnant of Sagan between 1838 and 1845. She was Princess consort of Hohenzollern-Hechingen by marriage to Friedrich Hermann Otto, Prince of Hohenzollern-Hechingen.

== Life ==
Pauline was the second-eldest child and daughter of Peter von Biron, the last Duke of Courland and Semigallia, and his third wife Dorothea von Medem.

Pauline married Friedrich Hermann Otto, Hereditary Prince of Hohenzollern-Hechingen, on 26 February 1800 in Prague. She separated from her spouse in 1805, after an affair with her brother-in-law Prince Louis de Rohan-Guémenée (1768–1836).

During the Vienna Congress of 1815, she had an affair with General Ludwig von Wallmoden-Gimborn which attracted attention.

In 1838, she inherited the Duchy of Sagan after the death of her sister. She appointed her son as her heir. She herself preferred to live in Vienna. After her death, she was succeeded as Duchess by her sister.

She spent the last years of her life together with her sister Princess Joanna of Courland in Vienna. She was buried in the Biron mausoleum in the Church of Grace, Żagań.

=== Issue ===
Pauline and Friedrich had one son:

- Constantine, Prince of Hohenzollern-Hechingen (16 February 1801 – 3 September 1869)

Princess Pauline, Duchess of Sagan House of Biron Born: 19 February 1782 Died: 8 January 1845
Regnal titles
Preceded by Maria Antonia of Waldburg-Wurzachon	Princess consort of Hohenzollern-Hechingen; 2 November 1810 – 13 September 1838	Succeeded by Eugénie de Beauharnais
German nobility
Preceded by Princess Wilhelmine of Courland	Duchess of Sagan; 29 November 1838 – 8 January 1845	Succeeded by Princess Dorothea of Courland
