= Peter von Biron =

Duke of Courland and Semigallia from 1769 to 1795

- Duke of Courland and Semigallia
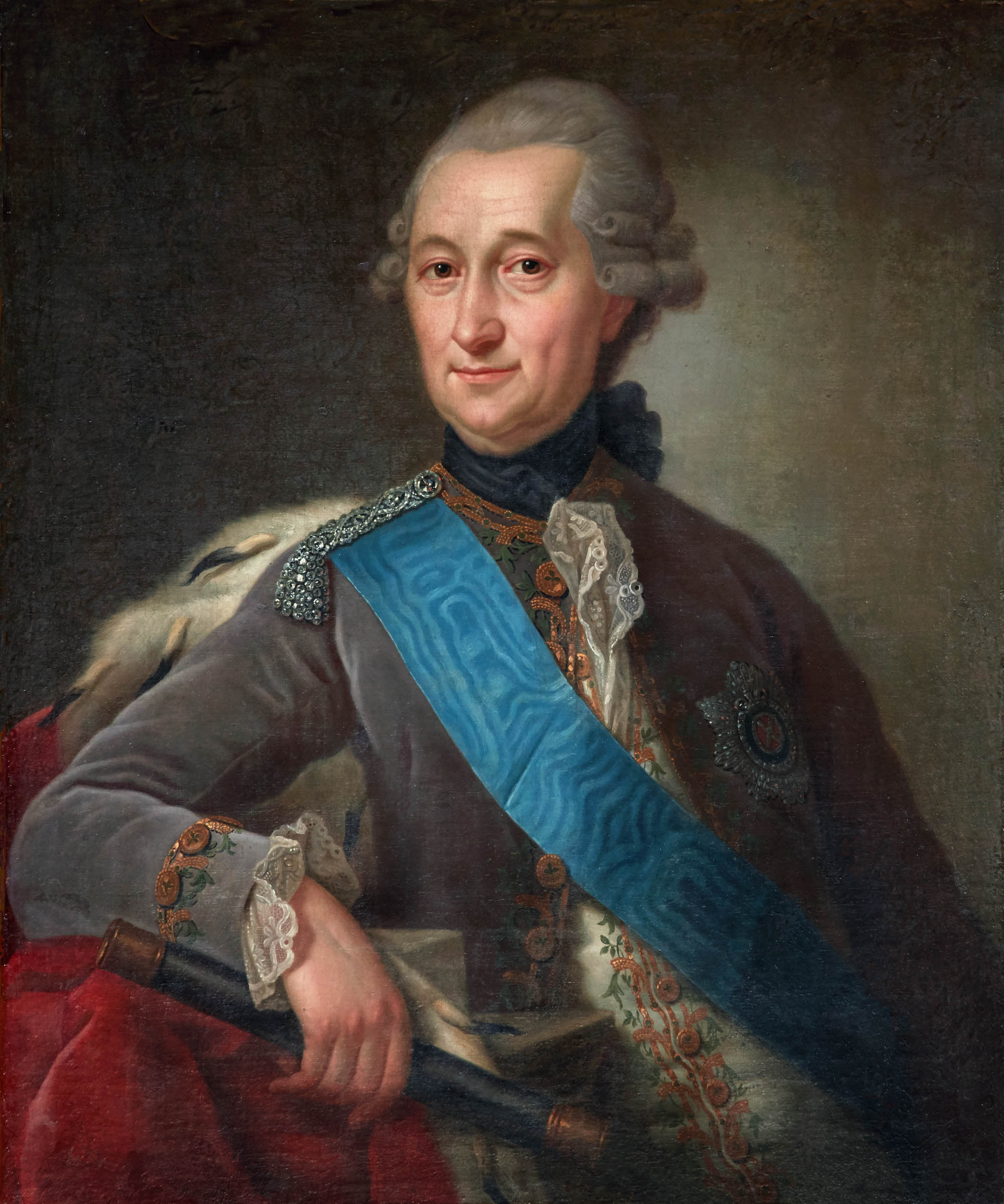
- Portrait by Friedrich Hartmann Barisien, c. 1782

Duke of Courland and Semigallia
- Reign: 1769–1795
- Predecessor: Ernst Johann von Biron
- Successor: None
- Born: 15 February 1724; Mitau, Duchy of Courland and Semigallia
- Died: 13 January 1800 (aged 75); Gellenau Palace, Gellenau, Kingdom of Prussia
- Spouse: Caroline of Waldeck and Pyrmont (m. 1765; div. 1772) Eudoxia Borisovna Yusupova (m. 1774; div. 1778) Dorothea von Medem (m. 1779)
- Issue: Wilhelmine, Duchess of Sagan; Pauline, Duchess of Sagan; Joanna, Duchess of Acerenza; Dorothea, Duchess of Sagan
- House: Biron
- Father: Ernst Johann, Duke of Courland and Semigallia
- Mother: Benigna Gottlieb von Trotha gt Treyden
- Religion: Lutheranism

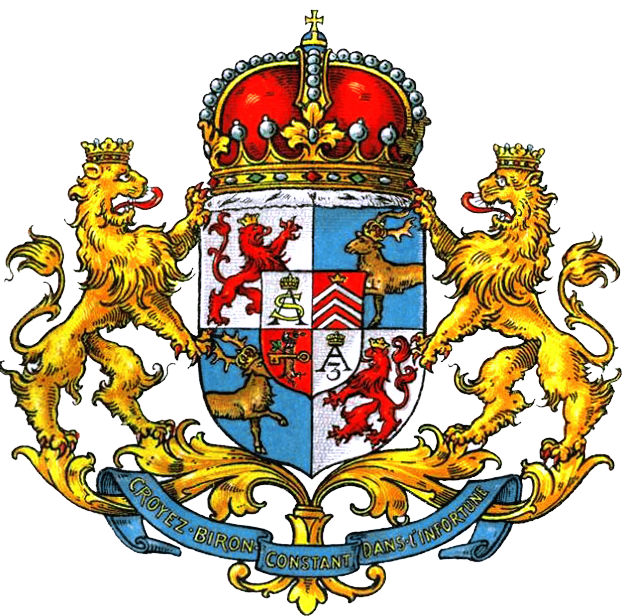
Coat of arms as Duke of Courland

Peter von Biron (15 February 1724 – 13 January 1800) was the last duke of Courland and Semigallia from 1769 to 1795, when it was annexed by the Russian Empire.

== Life and reign ==
Peter was born in Jelgava (German: Mitau) as the oldest son of Ernst Johann von Biron, future Duke of Courland, and his wife Benigna von Trotha. From 1730 until 1740, he and his family lived in Moscow and St. Petersburg, where his father was a lover and favorite of Anna of Russia.

When he was 16 years old, he was forced to follow his family into their exile, first to Tobolsk Governorate in Siberia, then from 1742 until 1762 in Yaroslavl. In 1765, he married Princess Caroline of Waldeck and Pyrmont, but the union produced only one son, who was stillborn, in 1766.

In 1769, he was given the Duchy of Courland and Semigallia by his father. However, he had acted as de facto duke for several years already. In 1770, he gave an oath to the Courland Knighthood. He was also elected a Fellow of the Royal Society in 1771.

In 1775, he founded the Academia Petrina in Jelgava. Hoping that the school would grow into a university, he addressed Immanuel Kant and Johann Gottfried Herder to become professors, but both refused.

In 1774, he married Yevdokiya Yusupova, but the marriage was unsuccessful and they divorced in 1778. In 1779, he married Dorothea von Medem, a marriage that produced 6 children. He was known to have been abusive to at least two of his wives.

He ceded the government of the duchy and then its territory to the Russian Empire in 1795, and received in return a high appanage. This helped him to buy and refurbish for his purposes a palace in Berlin's street of Unter den Linden (Palais Kurland, bought in 1782). In 1785, he bought the park and palace in Friedrichsfelde (part of today's Tierpark Berlin), which he rebuilt in luxurious beauty.

In April 1786, he purchased the Duchy of Sagan from the Bohemian Lobkovic family, then additionally used the title of Duke of Żagań. In 1795, Russia determined the further fate of Courland when, with its allies, it began the third division of Poland. Given a "nice recommendation" by Russia, Duke Peter von Biron gave up his rights to Russia. With the signing of the final document on 28 March 1795, the Duchy of Courland ceased to exist.

Five years later, after several months of illness, Peter died in Gellenau. First, he was buried in an Augustinian abbey church, but in 1847, he was reburied in a Lutheran church in Żagań.

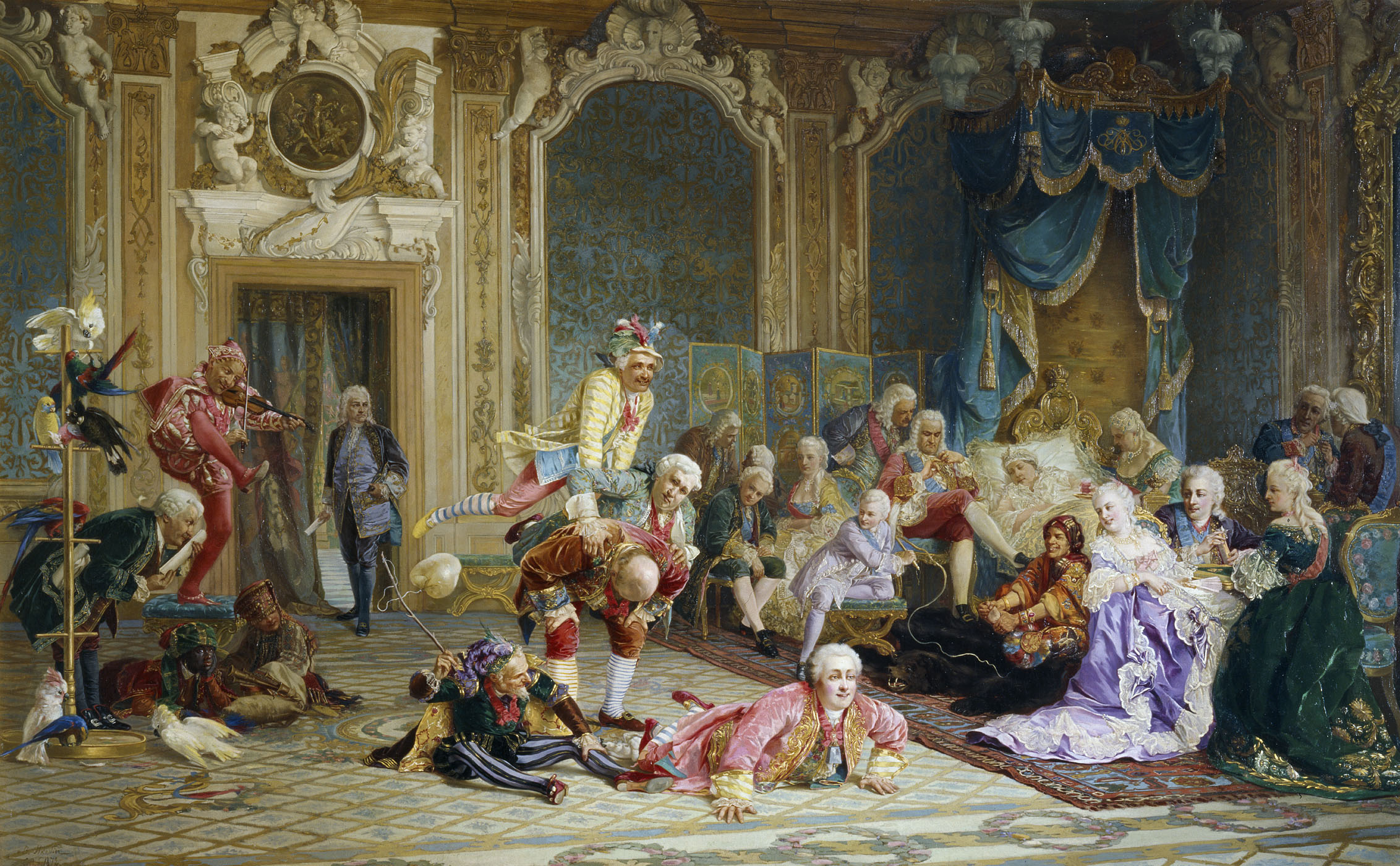
Jesters of empress Anna Ioannovna. Duke Peter is sitting in the middle in a blue suit with a stick. Painting by Valery Jacobi (1872)

== Marriage and issue ==
Peter married:

1. Princess Caroline of Waldeck and Pyrmont (14 August 1748 – 1782) in 1765; divorced in 1772
2. Princess Eudoxia Borisovna Yusopova (16 May 1743 – 1780) in 1774; divorced in 1778
3. Countess Dorothea von Medem (a member of the old Courland nobility) in 1779. They had six children, of whom two died in infancy. The remaining four were:
  - Princess Wilhelmine, Duchess of Sagan; on Peter's death, it was she who inherited the duchy of Sagan in Silesia and the Herrschaft of Náchod in Bohemia.
  - Princess Pauline (19 February 1782, Mitau - 8 January 1845, Vienna); married Prince Friedrich Hermann, Prince of Hohenzollern-Hechingen; on Peter's death, she inherited the Prager Palais and the Herrschaft of Hohlstein and Nettkow, and on Wilhelmine's death she also inherited the duchy of Sagan in Silesia and the Herrschaft of Náchod in Bohemia.
  - Princess Joanna (24 June 1783, Würzau - 11 April 1876, Löbichau); married Francesco Ravaschieri Fieschi Squarciafico Pinelli Pignatelli y Aymerich, Duke of Acerenza. In 1806, she inherited the Kurland-Palais in Prague and on her mother's death inherited the Herrschaft of Löbichau in Altenburgischen. She died without posterity.
  - Princess Dorothea, married Edmond de Talleyrand-Périgord, 2nd duke of Talleyrand and 1st duke of Dino in Calabria. A Polish nobleman, Alexander Batowski, was rumoured to be her biological father, but Peter acknowledged her as his own. On Peter's death she inherited the Kurland-Palais in Berlin and the Herrschaft of Deutsch Wartenberg; on her sister Pauline's death in 1845 she also inherited the Duchy of Sagan.

== Bibliography ==
- "Бироны" . Brockhaus and Efron Encyclopedic Dictionary (in Russian). 1906.
- Hugo Weczerka (Hg.): Handbuch der historischen Stätten Schlesien, Stuttgart 1977
- Dehio-Handbuch der Kunstdenkmäler in Polen: Schlesien, Deutscher Kunstverlag, 2005
- Věra Vlčková: Pamětihodnosti panstvί Náchod důchodnίho Jana Müllera. In: Stopami Dějin Náchodska, Nachod 1997
- Alois Jirasek: Na dvoře vévodském, Historický Obraz. Prag 1953

Peter von Biron House of Biron Born: 15 February 1724 Died: 13 January 1800
Regnal titles
Preceded by Ernst Johann von Biron	Duke of Courland; 1769–1795	Title abolished Duchy incorporated into Russian Empire
Titles in pretence
Preceded by Loss of title	— TITULAR — Duke of Courland; 1795–1800	Succeeded by Charles II
