= Ernst Johann von Biron =

Duke of Courland (r. 1737–1740; 1763–1769)

- Duke of Courland and Semigallia
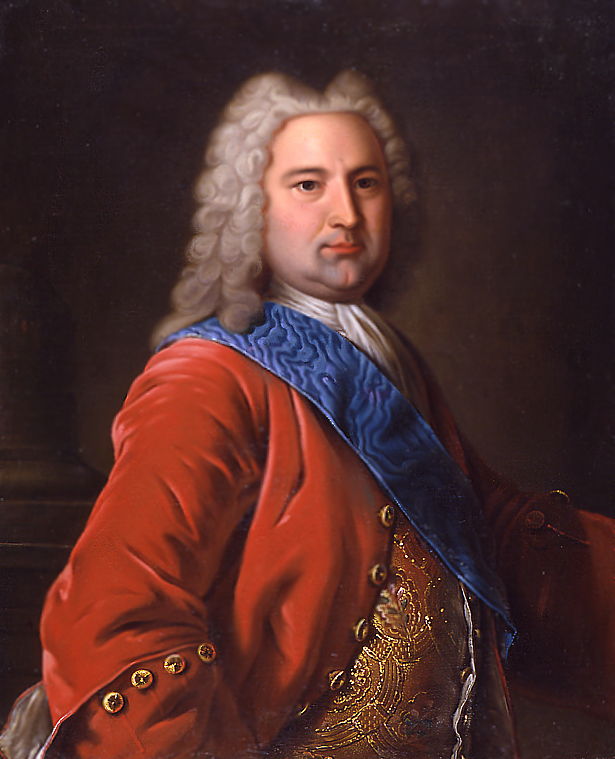
- Portrait, c. 1730

Duke of Courland and Semigallia
- Reign: 1737–1740
- Predecessor: Ferdinand
- Successor: Council of the Duke
- Reign: 1763–1769
- Predecessor: Charles
- Successor: Peter

Regent of Russia
- Regency: 28 October – 20 November 1740
- Monarch: Ivan VI
- Successor: Anna Leopoldovna
- Born: 23 November 1690; Kalnzeem, Courland and Semigallia
- Died: 29 December 1772 (aged 82); Mitau, Courland and Semigallia
- Burial: Ducal crypt in the Jelgava Palace
- Spouse: Benigna Gottlieb von Trotha gt Treyden (m. 1723)
- Issue: Peter, Duke of Courland; Hedvig, Baroness Cherkasova; Prince Karl Ernst
- House: Biron
- Father: Karl von Bühren
- Mother: Catharina Hedwig von Raab gen. Thülen
- Religion: Lutheranism

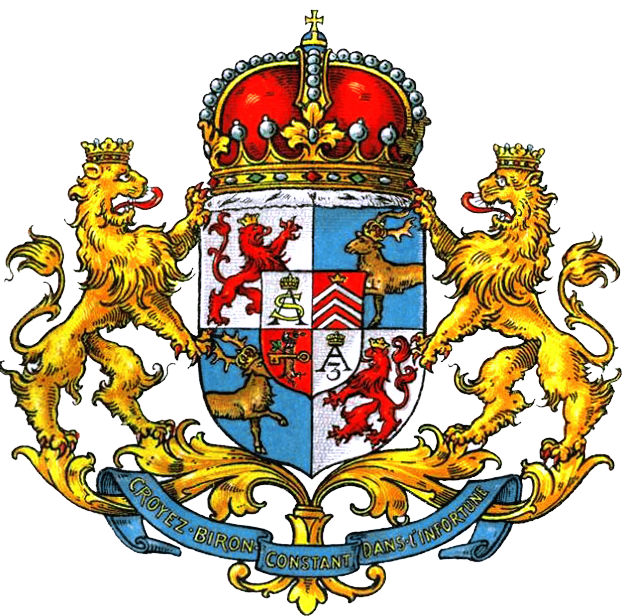
Coat of arms as Duke of Courland

Ernst Johann von Biron (German: Ernst Johann von Biron; Russian: Эрнст Иоганн Бирон; 23 November [O.S. 13 November] 1690 – 29 December [O.S. 18 December] 1772) was the duke of Courland and Semigallia from 1737 to 1740 and again from 1763 to 1769. He was also briefly the regent of the Russian Empire in 1740.

== Early years ==
Biron was born as Ernst Johann von Bühren in Kalnciems, Semigallia, as a second son of Cornet Karl von Bühren and Katharina Hedwig von der Raab genannt Thülen. His grandfather Carl von Bühren had been a groom in the service of Jacob Kettler, Duke of Courland, and had received a small estate from his master, which Biron's father inherited and where Biron himself was born. He received some education at the academy of Königsberg, but was expelled from there for riotous conduct. In 1714, he set out to seek his fortune in Russia, and unsuccessfully solicited a place at the offices of Princess Charlotte of Brunswick-Lüneburg, wife of the Tsarevich Alexei Petrovich.

Unsuccessful in Russia, Biron returned after a while to Mitau (Courland), where one of his sisters, who served as a lady in waiting to Anna, regent of Courland, had become the fancy of the ruling minister, Peter Bestuzhev. Through his sister's intercession and the minister's favour, Biron gained a place at Anna's court. Later, during his patron's absence, Biron, a handsome, insinuating fellow, succeeded in supplanting him in Anna's favour, and even procuring the disgrace and banishment of Bestuzhev and his family. From this time to the end of her life, Biron's influence over Anna was paramount, and he would be at the pinnacle of this life during the period when she ruled Russia as Empress Anna.

== Ruling Russia ==
In 1723, Biron married Benigna Gottlieb von Trotha genannt Treyden, a lady-in-waiting to Regent Anna and the daughter of a Baltic-German nobleman. The marriage, which was reportedly arranged by Anna in an attempt to conceal her own relationship with Biron, proved harmonious and felicitous. His wife remained devoted to Biron not only throughout his years as Anna's favorite and confidant, but also during his two decades of exile to Siberia after her death, which Benigna shared with Biron. They had three children together, a son, Peter, prince of Courland, a son Karl Ernst von Biron (1728–1801) and a daughter, Hedvig Elizabeth.

In 1730, Anna was elevated to the Russian throne. Biron and his wife moved to Moscow, both of them retaining their position as adviser and lady-in-waiting, and received many honours and riches. At Anna's coronation (19 May 1730), Biron was appointed grand chamberlain, made a count of the Empire, and granted an estate at Wenden with an income of 50,000 crowns a year. It was on this occasion that his name was first rendered in court documents as 'Biron' (rather than 'Biren'), and he is said to have adopted the arms of the French Ducal House of Biron, to which house he did not in fact have the slightest connection.

The Council of the Empire attempted to secure from Anna an aristocratic constitution, but she crushed the powerful nobility, notably the Dolgorukis and the Galitsins, and placed her reliance exclusively on Biron, who became for all practical purposes the ruler of the Empire. His ascendancy over the empress was unshakable, and whenever required, Biron's enemies and rivals were swept out of the way quite literally; he is said to have caused over 1,000 executions, while the number of persons exiled by him to Siberia is estimated at between 20,000–40,000. Meanwhile, the common people were ground down by taxation. Russians have described this reign as the Bironovshchina. Nevertheless, he showed himself an administrator of considerable ability, and maintained order in the Empire at a time when troubles could have been expected, because the main Romanov line was now extinct, and even the empress did not have children or definite heirs.

During the latter years of Anna's reign in Russia, Biron increased enormously in power and riches. His apartments in the palace adjoined those of the empress, and his liveries, furniture and equipages were scarcely less expensive or splendid than hers. The magnificence of his plate astonished the French ambassador, and the diamonds of his duchess were the envy of princes. A special department of state looked after his brood mares and stallions. He had landed estates everywhere. Half the bribes intended for the Russian court passed through his coffers.

== Duke of Courland and Semigallia ==
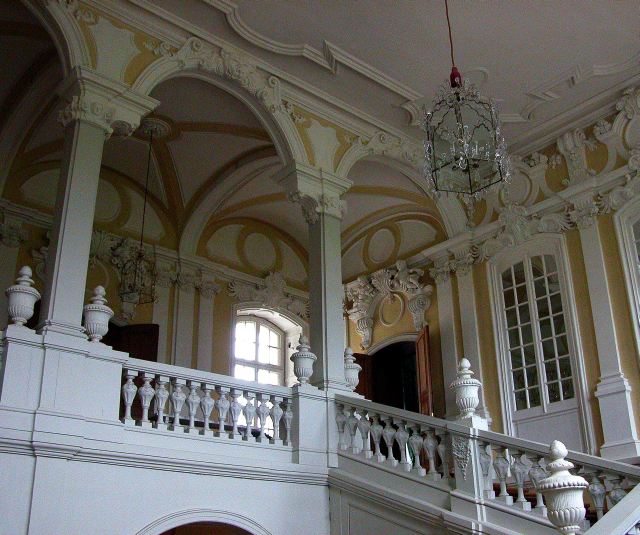
Staircase in Rundāle Palace, Biron's residence in Rundāle Parish, Latvia.

The climax of his elevation occurred in June 1737 when, on the extinction of the line of Kettler, the nobility ('estates') of Courland were arm-twisted into electing Biron as their reigning duke. Anna had been the wife of the penultimate duke, whose successor, his uncle Ferdinand, died childless in that year. The Kettler dynasty being now extinct, the estates were called upon to elect a new duke, and Anna proposed Biron. He was almost as unpopular in Courland and Semigallia as in Russia, and the estates were mortified at the prospect of this upstart holding sway over them, but the will of the empress could not be easily gainsaid. Still, it was found necessary to supply large sums of money, smuggled into Courland and Semigallia in the shape of bills payable in Amsterdam to bearer, in order to persuade the electors to fall in with Anna's choice. There was another complication: the duchy of Courland and Semigallia was then in dispute between Poland and Lithuania and Russia. Russian armies were employed to place Augustus III, Elector of Saxony, on the Polish throne. In return, the Elector promised that Biron would be invested with the duchy of Courland and Semigallia. The Emperor Charles VI, subordinating everything to his Pragmatic Sanction, readily countenanced these violent acts, and the king of Prussia was bought by certain territorial concessions. The investiture took place in 1739 at Warsaw by authority of the Polish king and senate.

== Fall from power ==
Outwardly humble during his first years in power, Biron became haughty and overbearing towards the end of Anna's reign. This behavior and the gruesome execution on somewhat dubious charges of his erstwhile protégé, the cabinet minister Artemy Volynsky (insisted upon by Biron), made Biron unpopular with Russians of all classes.

On her deathbed, very unwillingly and only at his urgent entreaty, Anna appointed Biron regent during the minority of the baby emperor, Ivan VI of Russia. Her common sense told her that the only way she could save the man she loved from the vengeance of his enemies after her death was to facilitate in time his descent from his untenable position. Finally, on 26 October 1740, a so-called "positive declaration" signed by 194 dignitaries, in the name of the Russian nation, conferred the regency on Biron.

Anna died on October 28. Biron's regency lasted exactly three weeks—at midnight on 19 November 1740 he was seized in his bedroom by his ancient rival, Field Marshal Münnich. A commission was appointed to try his case, and it condemned him (11 April 1741) to death by quartering. However, this sentence was commuted by the clemency of the new regent, Anna Leopoldovna, the mother of Ivan VI, to banishment for life at Pelym in Siberia. All of Biron's vast property was confiscated, including his diamonds, worth £600,000. A second palace revolution occurred soon afterwards, and the new empress, Elizabeth Petrovna, banished Münnich and permitted Biron to take up his residence at Yaroslavl.

== Later years ==
For 22 years, the ex-regent disappeared from the high places of history. He re-emerged for a brief moment in 1762, when the Germanophile Peter III of Russia summoned him to court. In 1763, Catherine II of Russia re-established him in his duchy of Courland, which he bequeathed to his son Peter in 1769. The last years of his rule were just and even benevolent, if somewhat autocratic. He died at Rastrelli's palace in Mitava, his capital, on 29 December 1772. His wife, who had been his faithful companion in all his travails, as in his ascendency, survived him by ten years. Biron was succeeded as Duke of Courland by their son, Peter von Biron.

== See also ==
- Robert Nisbet Bain, The Pupils of Peter the Great (London, 1897)
- Carl Wilhelm Cruse, Curland unter den Herzögen (Mitau, 1837), Band 2, pp. 1-11, 85-176.
- Edgardo Franzosini, Il mangiatore di carta (Milano:SugarCo) 1989
- C.F. Hemple, Merckwürdiges Leben des Grafen von Biron, Weltbekannten Ernst Johann Bürens, Gewesenen Regentens des Russischen Reichs, auch Herzogs, in Liefland, zu Curland, und Semgalien. (Bremen: Verlegst Nathanael Saurmann, 1743).
- Christoph Hermann von Manstein, Memoirs (English edition, London, 1856).
- Claudius Rondeau, Diplomatic Dispatches from Russia (St Petersburg, 1889–1892).
- Ph. J. Rühl, Geschichte Ernst Johann von Biron, Herzogs in Liefland, zu Curland und Semgallien, in verschiedenen Briefen entworfen. (Frankfurt und Leipzig, 1764).
- Игорь Курукин, Бирон. Moscow, Molodaia Gvardiia, 2006. ISBN 978-5235027404.
- Schlossmuseum Rundale, Ernest Johan Biron, 1690-1990: Katalog der Ausstellung im Schloß Rundale/Ruhental. (1993).

== Sources ==
- "Бироны" . Brockhaus and Efron Encyclopedic Dictionary (in Russian). 1906.

Ernst Johann von Biron House of Biron Born: 1690 Died: 1772
Regnal titles
Preceded by Ferdinand Kettler	Duke of Courland; 1737–1740	Succeeded by Duke Louis Ernest of Brunswick-Lüneburg
Preceded by Charles of Saxony, Duke of Courland	Duke of Courland; 1763–1769	Succeeded by Peter von Biron
