= Löbichau =

- Municipality
- Coat of arms

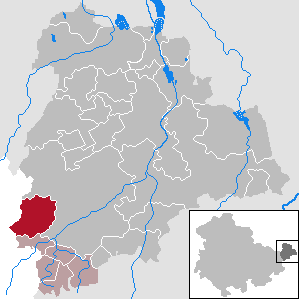
- Location of Löbichau within Altenburger Land district
- Interactive map of Löbichau
- Location within Germany Location within Thuringia
- Coordinates: 50°53′36″N 12°16′0″E
- Country: Germany
- State: Thuringia
- District: Altenburger Land
- Municipal assoc.: Oberes Sprottental
- Subdivisions: 8

Government
  - Mayor (2022–28): Rolf Hermann

Area
  - Total: 16.73 km^{2} (6.46 sq mi)
- Elevation: 240 m (790 ft)

Population (2025-12-31)
  - Total: 931
  - Density: 55.6/km^{2} (144/sq mi)
- Time zone: UTC+01:00 (CET)
  - Summer (DST): UTC+02:00 (CEST)
- Postal codes: 04626
- Dialling codes: 034491
- Vehicle registration: ABG
- Website: www.gemeinde-loebichau.de

Löbichau (German pronunciation: [ˈløːbɪçaʊ]) is a municipality in the district Altenburger Land, in Thuringia, Germany.

The Ostthüringer Zeitung (OTZ) has its head office in the municipality.
