= List of heirs to the Danish throne =

List of heirs to the Danish throne lists all who have been first-in-line to the throne of the Kingdom of Denmark since the establishment of the King's Law in 1665.

Heirs to the Danish throne
House of Oldenburg (1665–1863)
Monarch	Heir	Relationship to monarch	Became heir (Date; Reason)	Ceased to be heir (Date; Reason)	Next in line of succession
Frederik III	Crown Prince Christian	Son	14 November 1665; King's Law established	9 February 1670; Father died, became king	Prince Jørgen, brother
Christian V	Prince Jørgen	Brother	9 February 1670; Brother became king	2 October 1671; Son born to king	Anna Sophie, Hereditary Electress of Saxony, sister
Christian V	Crown Prince Frederik	Son	2 October 1671; Born	25 August 1699; Father died, became king	Prince Jørgen, 1671–1672, uncle
Christian V	Crown Prince Frederik	Son	2 October 1671; Born	25 August 1699; Father died, became king	Prince Christian Vilhelm, 1672–1673, brother
Christian V	Crown Prince Frederik	Son	2 October 1671; Born	25 August 1699; Father died, became king	Prince Jørgen, 1673–1675, uncle
Christian V	Crown Prince Frederik	Son	2 October 1671; Born	25 August 1699; Father died, became king	Prince Christian, 1675–1695, brother
Christian V	Crown Prince Frederik	Son	2 October 1671; Born	25 August 1699; Father died, became king	Prince Carl, 1695–1697, brother
Christian V	Crown Prince Frederik	Son	2 October 1671; Born	25 August 1699; Father died, became king	Prince Christian, 1697–1698, son
Christian V	Crown Prince Frederik	Son	2 October 1671; Born	25 August 1699; Father died, became king	Prince Carl, 1698–1699, brother
Frederik IV	Prince Carl	Brother	25 August 1699; Brother became king	10 December 1699; Son born to king	Prince Vilhelm, brother
Frederik IV	Crown Prince Christian	Son	10 December 1699; Born	12 October 1730; Father died, became king	Prince Carl, 1699–1701, uncle
Frederik IV	Crown Prince Christian	Son	10 December 1699; Born	12 October 1730; Father died, became king	Prince Frederik Karl, 1701–1702, brother
Frederik IV	Crown Prince Christian	Son	10 December 1699; Born	12 October 1730; Father died, became king	Prince Carl, 1702–1703, uncle
Frederik IV	Crown Prince Christian	Son	10 December 1699; Born	12 October 1730; Father died, became king	Prince Jørgen, 1703–1704, brother
Frederik IV	Crown Prince Christian	Son	10 December 1699; Born	12 October 1730; Father died, became king	Prince Carl, 1704–1723, uncle
Frederik IV	Crown Prince Christian	Son	10 December 1699; Born	12 October 1730; Father died, became king	Prince Frederik, 1723–1730, son
Christian VI	Crown Prince Frederik	Son	12 October 1730; Father became king	6 August 1746; Father died, became king	Princess Louise, 1730–1745, sister
Christian VI	Crown Prince Frederik	Son	12 October 1730; Father became king	6 August 1746; Father died, became king	Prince Christian, 1745–1746, son
Frederik V	Crown Prince Christian	Son	6 August 1746; Father became king	3 June 1747; Died	Princess Sophie Magdalene, sister
Frederik V	Princess Sophie Magdalene	Daughter	3 June 1747; Brother died	29 January 1749; Son born to king	Princess Louise, 1747, aunt
Frederik V	Princess Sophie Magdalene	Daughter	3 June 1747; Brother died	29 January 1749; Son born to king	Princess Vilhelmine Karoline, 1747–1749, sister
Frederik V	Crown Prince Christian	Son	29 January 1749; Born	14 January 1766; Father died, became king	Princess Sophie Magdalene, 1749–1753, sister
Frederik V	Crown Prince Christian	Son	29 January 1749; Born	14 January 1766; Father died, became king	Prince Frederik, 1753–1766, half-brother
Christian VII	Hereditary Prince Frederik	Half-brother	14 January 1766; Half-brother became king	28 January 1768; Son born to king	Sophie Magdalene, Crown Princess of Sweden, half-sister
Christian VII	Crown Prince Frederik	Son	28 January 1768; Born	13 March 1808; Father died, became king	Prince Frederik, 1768–1791, uncle
Christian VII	Crown Prince Frederik	Son	28 January 1768; Born	13 March 1808; Father died, became king	Prince Christian, 1791, son
Christian VII	Crown Prince Frederik	Son	28 January 1768; Born	13 March 1808; Father died, became king	Prince Frederik, 1791–1797, uncle
Christian VII	Crown Prince Frederik	Son	28 January 1768; Born	13 March 1808; Father died, became king	Prince Christian, 1797, son
Christian VII	Crown Prince Frederik	Son	28 January 1768; Born	13 March 1808; Father died, became king	Prince Frederik, 1797–1805, uncle
Christian VII	Crown Prince Frederik	Son	28 January 1768; Born	13 March 1808; Father died, became king	Prince Christian Frederik, 1805–1808, first cousin
Frederik VI	Hereditary Prince Christian Frederik	First cousin	13 March 1808; First cousin became king	3 December 1839; First cousin died, became king	Prince Ferdinand, 1808, brother
Frederik VI	Hereditary Prince Christian Frederik	First cousin	13 March 1808; First cousin became king	3 December 1839; First cousin died, became king	Prince Frederik, 1808–1839, son
Christian VIII	Crown Prince Frederik	Son	3 December 1839; Father became king	20 January 1848; Father died, became king	Prince Ferdinand, uncle
Frederik VII	Hereditary Prince Ferdinand	Uncle	20 January 1848; Nephew became king	29 June 1863; Died	Succession uncertain, 1848–1853
Frederik VII	Hereditary Prince Ferdinand	Uncle	20 January 1848; Nephew became king	29 June 1863; Died	Prince Christian of Schleswig-Holstein-Sonderburg-Glücksburg (Note: In 1853, the law of succession was changed in order to allow Prince Christian of Schleswig-Holstein-Sonderburg-Glücksburg, a great-grandson of Frederick V, to inherit the throne after the predictable extinction of King Frederik III's male line, as both King Frederik VII and his uncle Ferdinand were childless.), 1853–1863, first cousin once-removed
Frederik VII	Prince Christian of Schleswig-Holstein-Sonderburg-Glücksburg	Second cousin	29 June 1863; First cousin once-removed died	15 November 1863; Second cousin died, became king	Prince Frederik of Schleswig-Holstein-Sonderburg-Glücksburg, son
House of Glücksburg (1863–present)
Monarch	Heir	Relationship to monarch	Became heir (Date; Reason)	Ceased to be heir (Date; Reason)	Next in line of succession
Christian IX	Crown Prince Frederik	Son	15 November 1863; Father became king	29 January 1906; Father died, became king	Prince Valdemar (Note: Prince Vilhelm, second son of Christian IX, became king of Greece before his father ascended the throne and deferred his succession rights.), 1863–1868, brother
Christian IX	Crown Prince Frederik	Son	15 November 1863; Father became king	29 January 1906; Father died, became king	Crown Prince Constantine of Greece, 1868-1870, nephew
Christian IX	Crown Prince Frederik	Son	15 November 1863; Father became king	29 January 1906; Father died, became king	Prince Christian, 1870–1906, son
Frederik VIII	Crown Prince Christian	Son	29 January 1906; Father became king	14 May 1912; Father died, became king	Prince Frederik, son
Christian X	Crown Prince Frederik	Son	14 May 1912; Father became king	20 April 1947; Father died, became king	Prince Knud, brother
Frederik IX	Hereditary Prince Knud	Brother	20 April 1947; Brother became king	5 June 1953; Law of succession changed	Prince Ingolf, son
Frederik IX	Princess Margrethe	Daughter	5 June 1953; Law of succession changed (Note: In 1953, the law of succession was changed from agnatic primogeniture to male-preference primogeniture.)	14 January 1972; Father died, became queen	Princess Benedikte, 1953–1968, sister
Frederik IX	Princess Margrethe	Daughter	5 June 1953; Law of succession changed	14 January 1972; Father died, became queen	Prince Frederik, 1968–1972, son
Margrethe II	Crown Prince Frederik	Son	14 January 1972; Mother became queen	14 January 2024; Mother abdicated, became king	Prince Joachim, 1972–2005, brother
Margrethe II	Crown Prince Frederik	Son	14 January 1972; Mother became queen	14 January 2024; Mother abdicated, became king	Prince Christian, 2005–2024, son
Frederik X	Crown Prince Christian	Son	14 January 2024; Father became king	Incumbent	Princess Isabella, sister
