= Abraham Wuchters =

Dutch-Danish painter and engraver

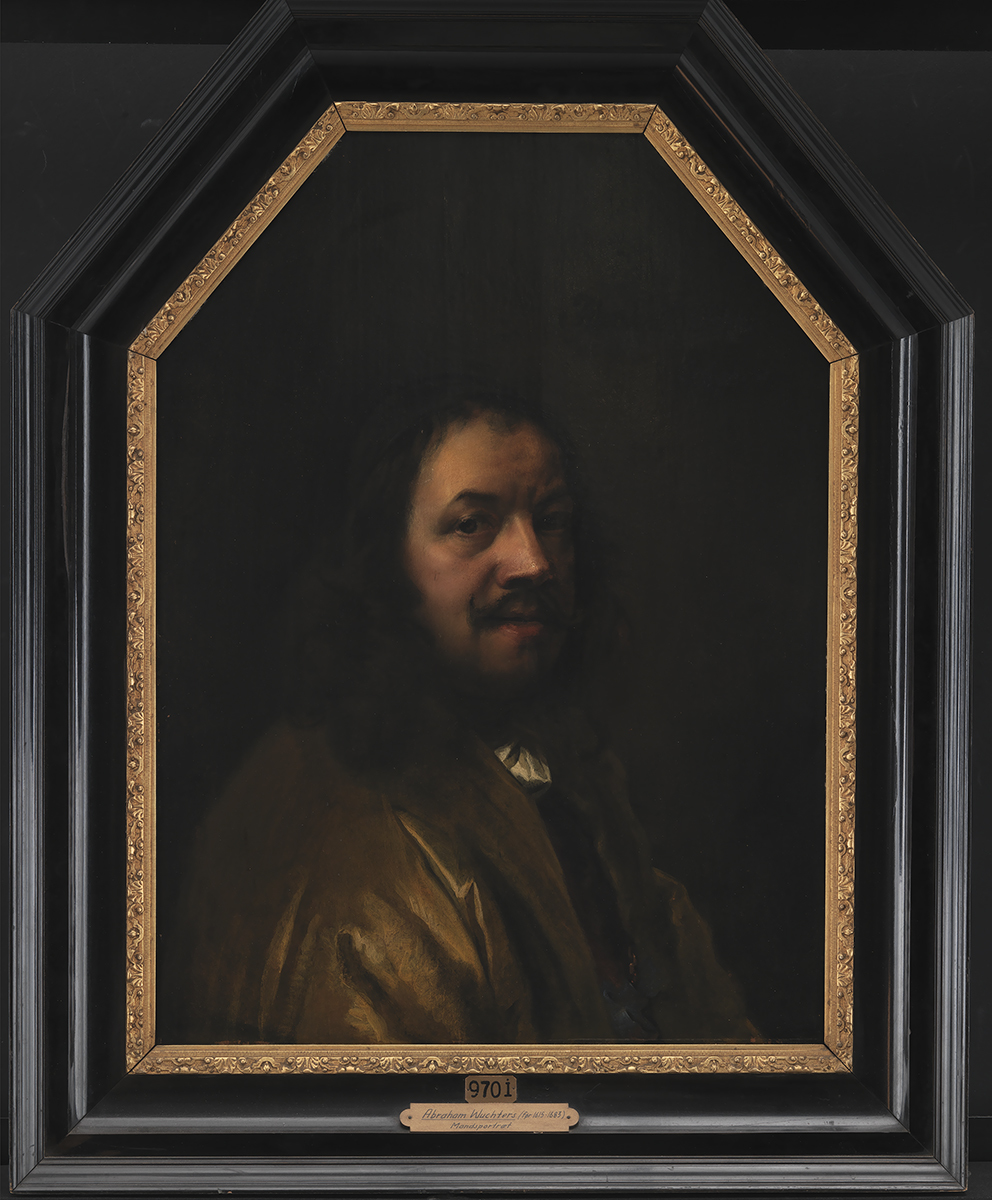
Self-portrait

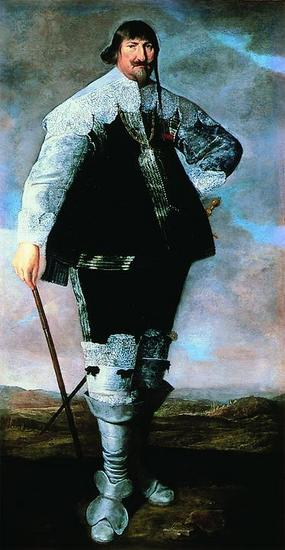
Christian IV of Denmark portrayed by Abraham Wuchters shortly after his arrival in Denmark

Abraham Wuchters (1608 – 23 May 1682) was a Brabant-born Dutch-Danish painter and engraver. He was born in Antwerp but had most of his career in Denmark where he and Karel van Mander III became the preferred painters of the Danish King, nobility and bourgeoisie. Together they represent the main influence from the Dutch Golden Age on Danish Baroque art.

== Biography ==
Wuchters was born in Antwerp in 1608. In 1635 he married Christina Cornelis Nunts in Zwolle. He arrived in Denmark in 1638 and was, the following year, employed as sketching master at Sorø Academy. Around the same time, he was summoned to Copenhagen where he painted several portraits of King Christian IV. In 1645 he returned to Copenhagen Castle to portray the King's children, including Ulrik Christian Gyldenløve (c. 1645, Danish National Gallery) and Duke Frederik (III) (c. 1645, Amalienborg Palace).

In two periods, between 1658 and 1662, he worked at the Royal Swedish Court in Stockholm where he portrayed Queen Consort Christina (1660, Uppsala University and 1661, Stockholm Castle), Charles X Gustav and Hedvig Eleonora.

Back in Denmark, Wuchters was engaged by Frederick III, who had instituted Denmark as an absolute monarchy in 1660, with responsibility for the maintenance of his paintings.

In 1671 the new king, Christian V, appointed him as official Painter to the Danish Court and in 1673 he was also made official Engraver to the Danish Court. It was, therefore, he alone who decided how the face of the absolutist King was to be represented.

As royal painter he also executed decorative works in the royal residences, such as in Rosenborg Castle. These include a fine fresco in Queen Consort Sophie Amalie's bedchamber, where she is depicted as Hera, the mother of the Greek gods.

== See also ==
- Art of Denmark
