= Princess Sophia Hedwig of Denmark =

Danish princess (1677–1735)

Sophia Hedwig of Denmark and Norway
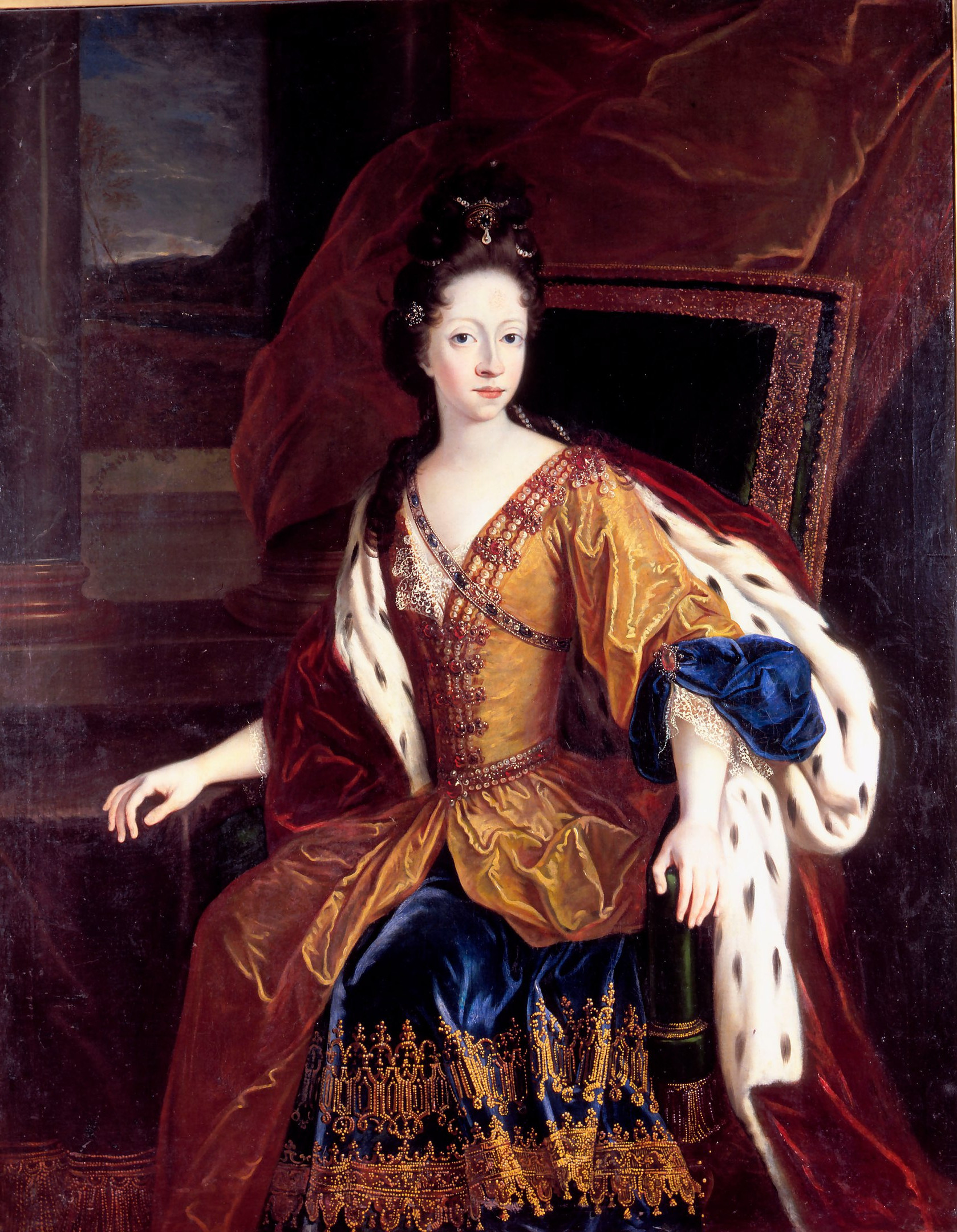
- Portrait by Benoît Le Coffre
- Born: 28 August 1677; Copenhagen, Denmark
- Died: 13 March 1735 (aged 57); Charlottenborg, Copenhagen
- Burial: Roskilde Cathedral
- House: Oldenburg
- Father: Christian V of Denmark
- Mother: Charlotte Amalie of Hesse-Kassel

Princess Sophia Hedwig of Denmark and Norway (28 August 1677 – 13 March 1735) was a Danish princess, the daughter of King Christian V and his queen-consort, Charlotte Amalie of Hesse-Kassel.

== Biography ==
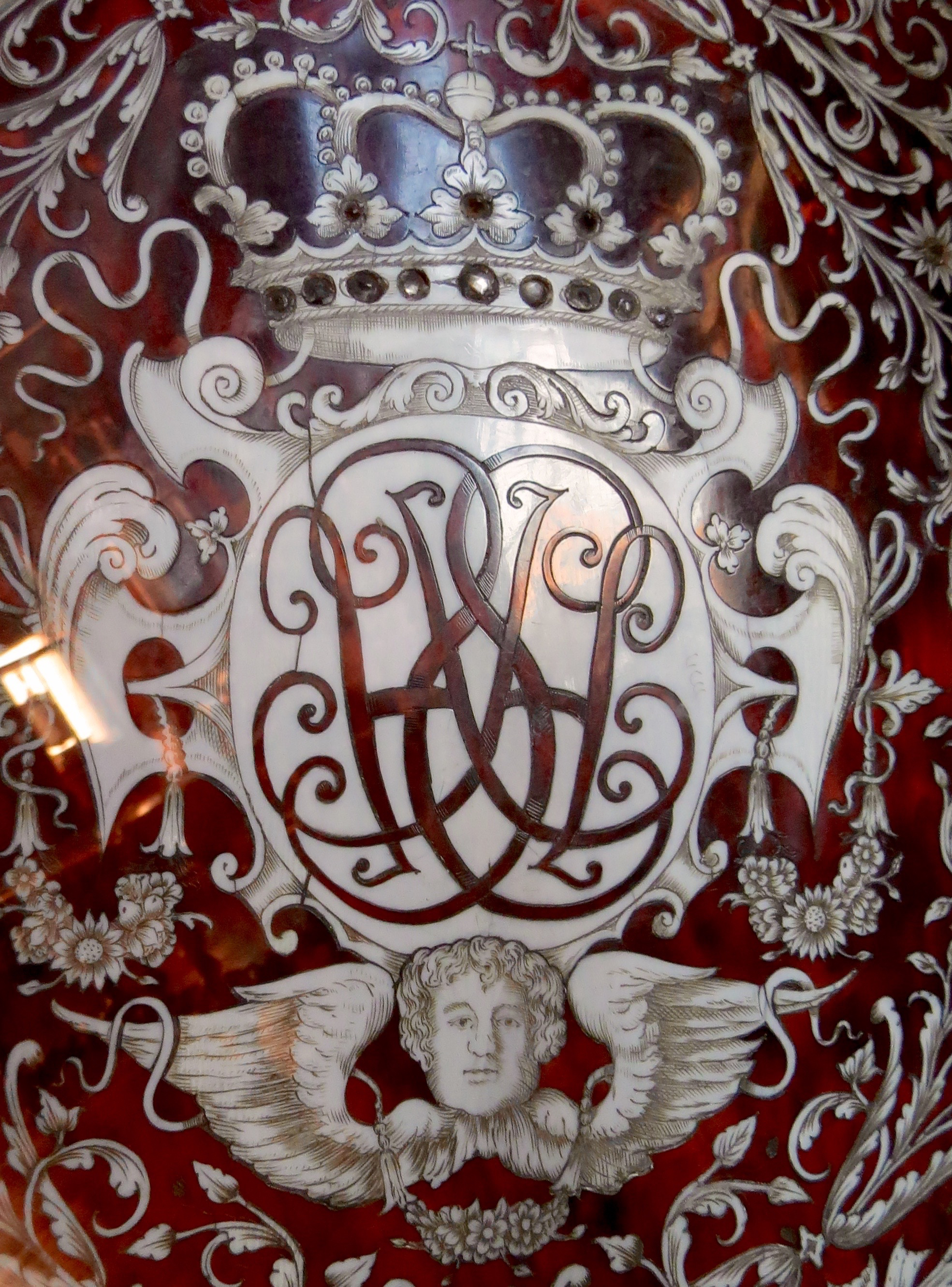
Princess Sophie Hedevig monogram at Rosenborg Castle

Sophia Hedwig became the object of marriage prospects early on and was betrothed three times. As a child, she became engaged to her cousin, John George IV, Elector of Saxony. This was in line with the traditional policy of dynastic marriage between Denmark and Saxony which had at that point become a tradition. In 1689, it was decided that the marriage was to take place two years later. When John George succeeded his father in 1691, he broke the engagement. In 1692, and later in 1694 to 1697, a marriage to the future Joseph I, Holy Roman Emperor, was suggested. However, Sophia Hedwig refused to convert to Catholicism despite considerable pressure to do so by her father.

Between 1697 and 1699, Denmark sought an alliance with Sweden, which would be formalized by a double wedding of Sophia Hedwig to Charles XII of Sweden, and her younger brother Charles to Charles XII's sister Hedvig Sophia (after the marriage of Hedvig Sophia in 1698, she was replaced by another sister, Ulrika Eleonora). However, though somewhat receptive to the idea of a Danish match, Charles XII did in fact not wish to marry at all, and the Danish-Swedish alliance was very unpopular in Sweden.

Sophia Hedwig remained officially unwed, although there were rumors that she secretly married a noble courtier, Carl Adolph von Plessen (1678-1758).

In 1699, her father died and was succeeded by her brother, Frederick IV. As was the custom, Sophia Hedwig lived with her mother until her mother's death in 1714, and after this at the court of her brother the king. Among her ladies-in-waiting was Elisabeth Helene von Vieregg, who in 1701 became Frederick's mistress, in 1703, his bigamous wife. When her mother died in 1714, she inherited the estates of Gjorslev and Erikstrup, which she gave to Frederick in exchange for the estates of Dronninglund, Dronninggård, and Børglum Abbey (Børglumkloster).

She had a good relationship with Frederick until 1721, when she left the court with her younger brother, Prince Charles, in protest at Frederick's marriage with Countess Anne Sophie von Reventlow. The siblings settled with their own courts at Vemmetofte, a manor which Charles had inherited from their mother. They had a court of 70 noble courtiers, headed by Carl Adolph von Plessen, who was the friend of her brother Charles and possibly her own secret spouse. They did not make peace with the King until several years later. Sophia Hedwig, as well as Charles and von Plessen, founded schools for the peasantry on her estates, in accordance with her pietistic belief that schools were necessary to give religious instructions.

When her brother Charles died in 1729, she was his favored heir. She inherited his sizable estates: Vemmetofte, Højstrup, and Charlottenborg. However, she was also responsible for his debts, which she paid off with the income from the estates of Sorgenfri Palace, Dronninggård, and Frederiksdal, which she was granted by her nephew Christian when he succeeded her brother Frederick as king in 1730.

She was a talented portrait painter and interested in music, handicrafts such as ornaments in ivory, and embroidery. She also collected psalm books and various writings. Many of her works are preserved in the Royal Danish Collection at Rosenborg Castle. In 1735, Vemmetofte Convent (Vemmetofte Kloster) for unmarried noblewomen was founded after instructions in her will. She died at the age of 57 at Charlottenborg.

== Ancestry ==
Ancestors of Princess Sophia Hedwig of Denmark

16. Frederick II of Denmark
8. Christian IV of Denmark
17. Sophie of Mecklenburg-Güstrow
4. Frederick III of Denmark
18. Joachim Frederick, Margrave of Brandenburg
9. Anne Catherine of Brandenburg
19. Margravine Catherine of Brandenburg-Küstrin
2. Christian V of Denmark
20. William, Duke of Brunswick-Lüneburg
10. George, Duke of Brunswick-Lüneburg
21. Princess Dorothea of Denmark
5. Sophie Amalie of Brunswick-Lüneburg
22. Louis V, Landgrave of Hesse-Darmstadt
11. Landgravine Anne Eleonore of Hesse-Darmstadt
23. Margravine Magdalene of Brandenburg
1. Princess Sophia Hedwig of Denmark
24. Maurice, Landgrave of Hesse-Kassel
12. William V, Landgrave of Hesse-Kassel
25. Countess Agnes of Solms-Laubach
6. William VI, Landgrave of Hesse-Kassel
26. Philipp Ludwig II, Count of Hanau-Münzenberg
13. Countess Amalie Elisabeth of Hanau-Münzenberg
27. Countess Catharina Belgica of Nassau
3. Charlotte Amalie of Hesse-Kassel
28. John Sigismund, Elector of Brandenburg
14. George William, Elector of Brandenburg
29. Duchess Anna of Prussia
7. Margravine Hedwig Sophie of Brandenburg
30. Frederick IV, Elector Palatine
15. Countess Palatine Elizabeth Charlotte of Simmern
31. Countess Louise Juliana of Nassau

== Other sources ==
- G.Greer, The Obstacle Race (1979)
