= Prince Christian of Denmark (1675–1695) =

Danish prince

Prince Christian of Denmark and Norway
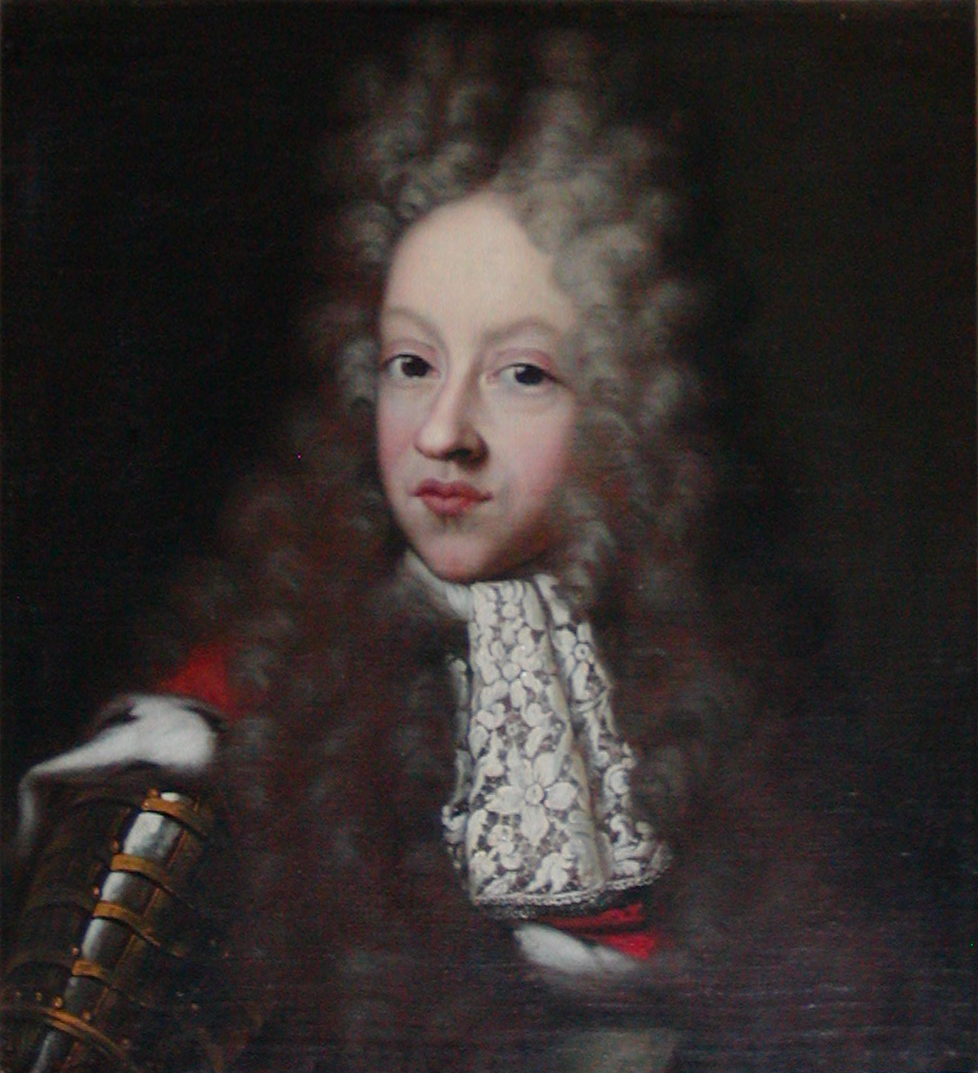
- Portrayed by french painter Jacob d'Agar
- Born: 25 March 1675; Copenhagen, Denmark
- Died: 27 June 1695 (aged 20); Ulm
- Burial: Roskilde Cathedral
- House: Oldenburg
- Father: Christian V of Denmark
- Mother: Charlotte Amalie of Hesse-Kassel
- Religion: Lutheranism

Prince Christian of Denmark and Norway (25 March 1675 – 27 June 1695) was the third son of Christian V of Denmark and his consort, Charlotte Amalie of Hesse-Kassel, and thus a younger brother of King Frederick IV. He died aged 20, and never married.

== Background ==
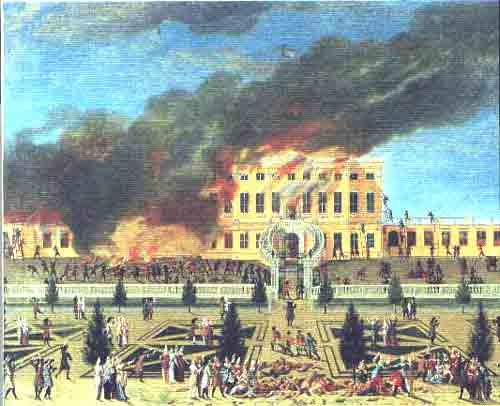
Sophie Amalienborg during the fire in 1689

At the age of 12 years old he was mentioned as a possible royal subject for Poland's throne. As a 14-year-old, he was in charge of the celebrations on the occasion of his father's birthday that brought probably the first opera in Denmark, which ended with the Amalienborg fire in 1689. Described as a strong and lively young man he took up his first major trip to Italy in May 1695, soon after he got infected by smallpox and died on June 27 in Ulm. The body was taken to Roskilde, where interment took place 11 September of that year.

== Ancestry ==
Ancestors of Prince Christian of Denmark (1675–1695)

8. Christian IV of Denmark
4. Frederick III of Denmark
9. Anne Catherine of Brandenburg
2. Christian V of Denmark
10. George, Duke of Brunswick-Lüneburg
5. Sophie Amalie of Brunswick-Lüneburg
11. Landgravine Anne Eleonore of Hesse-Darmstadt
1. Prince Christian of Denmark
12. William V, Landgrave of Hesse-Kassel
6. William VI, Landgrave of Hesse-Kassel
13. Countess Amalie Elisabeth of Hanau-Münzenberg
3. Charlotte Amalie of Hesse-Kassel
14. George William, Elector of Brandenburg
7. Margravine Hedwig Sophie of Brandenburg
15. Countess Palatine Elizabeth Charlotte of Simmern
