= Dorothea Justina Haxthausen =

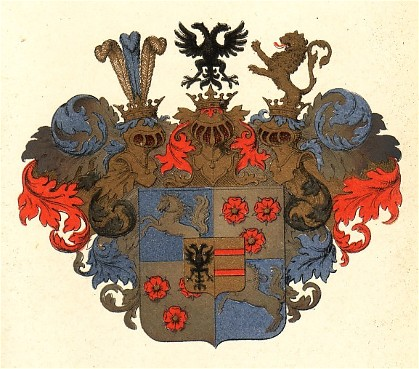
Coat of arms - von Aldenburg

Dorothea Justina von Haxthausen (1663-1735) was a Danish courtier. She was a lady-in-waiting to the queen of Denmark, Charlotte Amalie of Hesse-Kassel, and known as a favorite and confidante of the queen.

== Early life ==
She was the daughter of Count Anton I of Aldenburg (1633-1680) and his first wife Countess Augusta Johanna von Sayn-Wittgenstein-Hohenstein (1638-1669). Her father married for the second time and became stepdaughter to Charlotte Amélie de la Trémoille.

== Personal life ==
Countess Dorothea Juliana von Aldenburg married in 1689 German diplomat who served in Denmark, Anton Wolf von Haxthausen. They had one son, Count Christian Friedrich von Haxthausen.

== Court life ==
She was appointed Obersthofmeisterin to the queen of Denmark in 1695, and like her stepmother, became one of two ladies-in-waiting known as the favorite of the queen, who referred to her as "liebstes Dörtgen" and "Madame la Comtesse". The intimacy of their relationship is illustrated in a letter from the queen in reply to Hauxthausen, who had expressed concern that she would be unable to perform in her office because of her illnesses: "Do not fear that I shall be offended. No matter how ill you are, you shall always be as dear to me, and if God should wish to deprive me of a part of the help, which I would wish to have of your service, so let us both submit to his mighty hand." She is described as an accomplished and loveable personality. She retired from her office for health reasons in 1705.
