= Charlotte Amélie de La Trémoille =

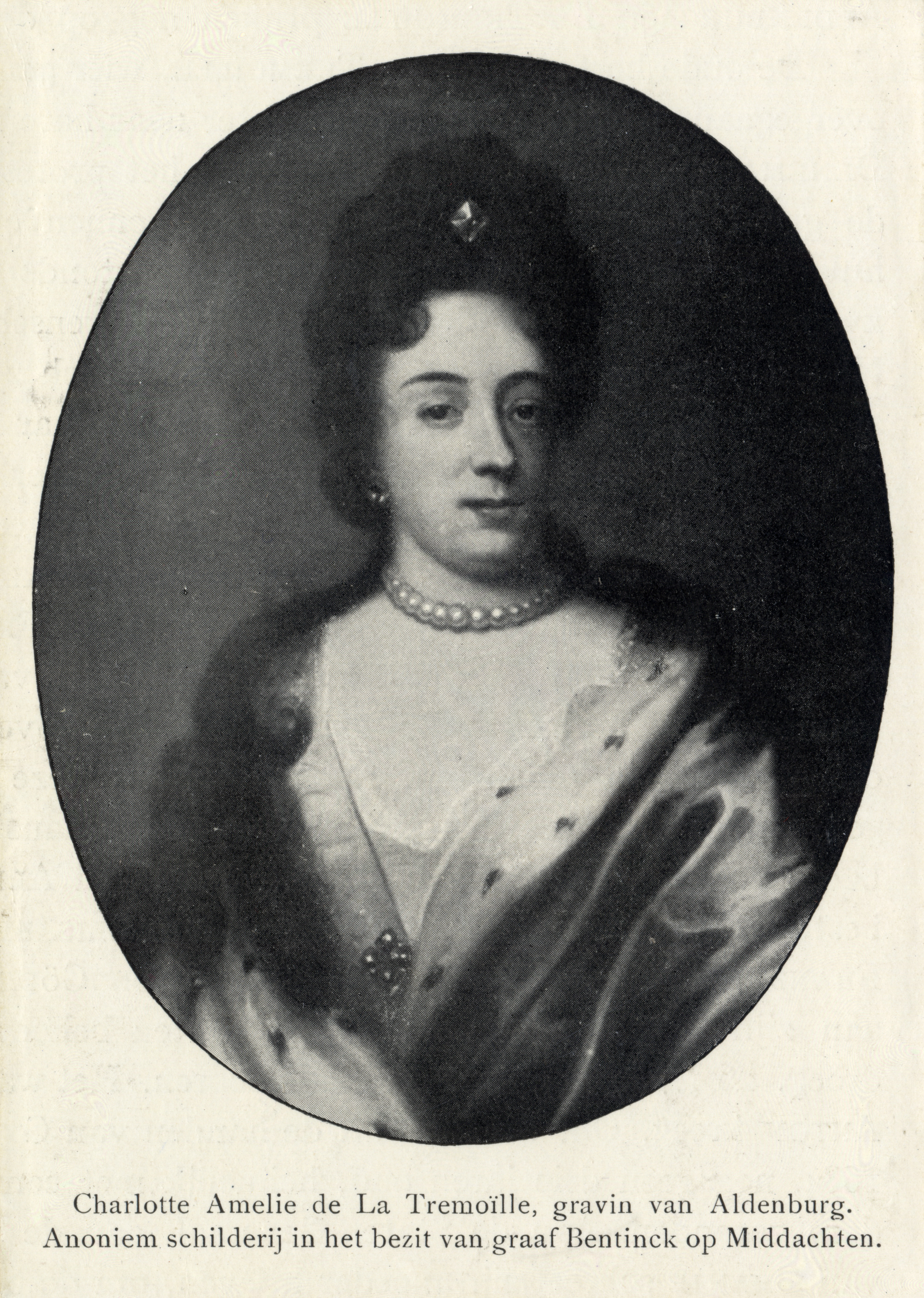

Charlotte Amélie de La Trémoille (Thouars, 1 March 1652 – 21 January 1732, Utrecht) was a memoirist and courtier. She was a lady-in-waiting to the queen of Denmark, Charlotte Amalie of Hesse-Kassel, and known as a favorite and confidante of the queen.

== Biography ==
She was the daughter of Henri Charles de La Trémoille, prince de Talmont and Tarente (1620–1672), and Princess Emilie of Hesse-Kassel (1626–1693).

Charlotte Amélie de La Trémoille was raised in France as a Huguenot Calvinist by her grandmother Princess Marie de la Tour d'Auvergne. After the death of her grandmother in 1665, she emigrated to the Netherlands to avoid being converted by her uncle, but returned in 1668. Her father converted in 1670 and demanded that his family do the same, which they refused. In 1672, her cousin Charlotte Amalie of Hesse-Kassel heard of her religious difficulties and offered her to come to Denmark as her lady-in-waiting, and she and her mother left for Copenhagen after having been permitted to depart by Louis XIV, where she was appointed hofdame (maid-of-honour) to the queen. Initially, she had difficulty adjusting to Danish court life, where the language was German, but she soon became the queen's favorite lady-in-waiting. She is described as pious but also bold and forward.

On 29 May 1680, she married Anton I, Count von Aldenburg (1633–1680). The match gave her spouse an alliance with Louis XIV. The marriage was liked by the king as well as by her mother, but extremely disliked by the queen because Aldenburg belonged to a party at the royal court which was hostile to the queen, and she reportedly told Charlotte Amélie that she hoped that she would soon become a widow. After the wedding, she left for Oldenburg. She had a son during the marriage. She did become a widow after only five months, and for the rest of her life, she was forced to engage in a long, ongoing inheritance dispute with the relatives of her late spouse to protect the rights of her son Count Anton II von Aldenburg. During the process, she made several visits to the royal Danish court to unsuccessfully ask for assistance, but the king supported the opposite party. Queen Charlotte Amalie, however, is known to have given her support, often invited her as guest, and visited her. Her stepdaughter Dorothea Justina von Haxthausen also became a favorite of the queen. She lived the rest of her life in the Netherlands; from 1706 onward in Utrecht.

La Trémoille wrote her own memoirs, intended to her son, which described her life from 1652 to 1719 and put focus on descriptions of famous people she met and the inheritance dispute which she fought for her son. They were given a great deal of interest from the late 19th century.

== Sources ==
- Umar Sayyed, Trémoïlle, Charlotte Amélie de la, in: Digitaal Vrouwenlexicon van Nederland. URL: http://resources.huygens.knaw.nl/vrouwenlexicon/lemmata/data/Tremoille [27/11/2014]
