= Juliane Elisabeth von Wallenstein =

Juliane Elisabeth von Wallenstein née von Uffeln (1618-1692) was a Danish courtier, Overhofmesterinde to the queen of Denmark, Charlotte Amalie of Hesse-Kassel, from 1677 to 1692.

She married the German chamberlain and nobleman Gottfried von Wallenstein in 1636.

She served as chief lady-in-waiting to Margravine Hedwig Sophie of Brandenburg in 1667-69, and to queen Charlotte Amalie in 1677-92. She is described as a confidante of the queen, who reportedly loved and trusted her.
