= Duborg Castle =

Former castle in Flensburg, Duchy of Schleswig

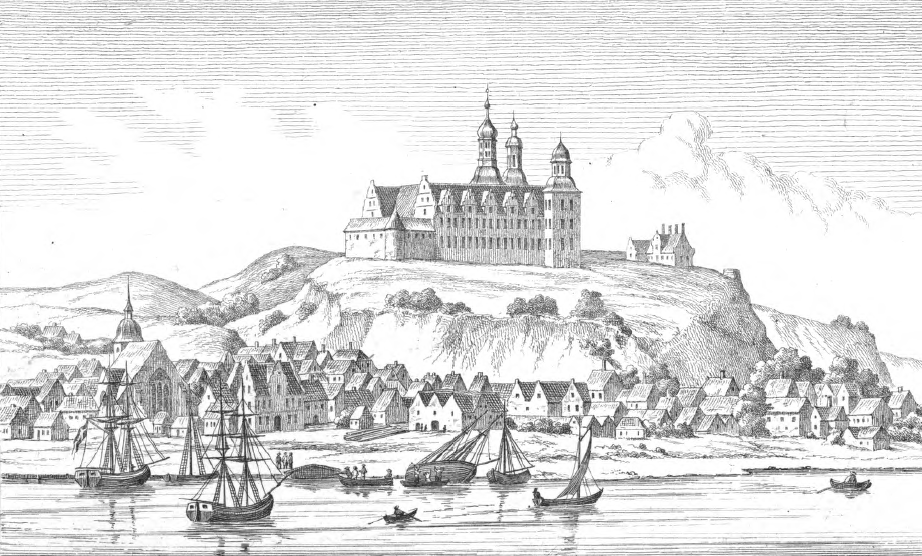
Duborg Castle in c. 1700. illustration from Jens Trap, 1864

Duborg Castle (Danish: Duborg Slot, German: Duburg Schloss) sometimes also referred to as Flensborghus (German: Flensburghaus) was a fortification and castle in Flensburg, Schleswig during the Middle Ages and Early modern period.

== Etymology ==
There is uncertainty about the etymology of Dyborg. One theory suggest that it was named after a Danish knight called Jens Due, who lived in the 16th century. Another explanation is that a dove (Danish: due) may have been included in the castle's coat of arms and thereby given its name. In early history of the castle it was named German Marienburg or Danish Marieborg after the hill it was erected on, which bore the same name.

== History ==
The castle was erected by Margaret I of Denmark and Eric of Pomerania, and would take five years to build, even continuing on parts of the fortifications after Margaret's death in 1412.

Built as protection against the Holsteinians, Duborg would serve an advantageous location in relation to attacks from the west, while the harbor could be defended from the castle. This came evident in 1431 when Adolph VIII of Holstein initiated a siege on the castle, which would last six months. When Christian I of Denmark became Duke of Holstein in 1460 he would inherit the castle, which would continue to be under the Danish kings after the partitions of Schleswig.

In the 16th and 17th century Duborg would serve as center of the Danish royal power in Schleswig and would concurrently be a place of residence of Danish monarchs. Frederick III of Denmark would live in the castle during his father, Christian IV's death, and Christian V of Denmark would be born there in 1646.

In 1703 the castle would stop being a royal residence and from 1719 it would start being demolished. The demolished bricks would be reused in other places like Flensburghus. The last remnants of the castle would be blown up around 1900.

== See also ==
- Haderslevhus
- Koldinghus – Danish royal castle
- Dano-Hanseatic War (1426–1435) – 15th-century northern European conflict
- Flensburg
