= Prince Charles of Denmark =

Danish prince (1680–1729)

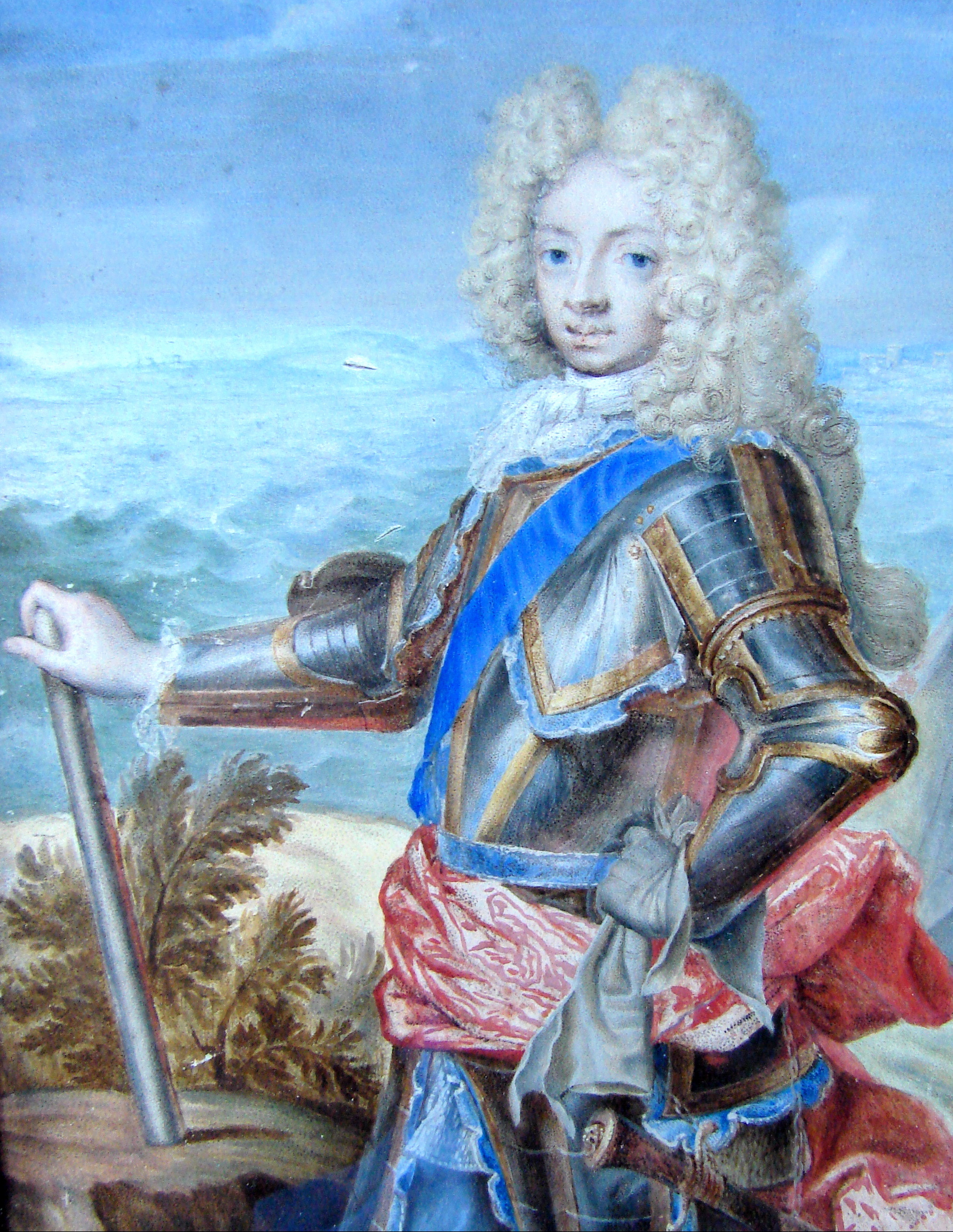
- Born: 26 October 1680; Copenhagen, Denmark
- Died: 8 June 1729 (aged 48); Vemmetofte, Denmark
- Burial: Roskilde Cathedral
- House: Oldenburg
- Father: Christian V of Denmark
- Mother: Charlotte Amalie of Hesse-Kassel

Prince Charles of Denmark and Norway (26 October 1680 – 8 June 1729) was the fourth son of Christian V of Denmark and his consort Queen Charlotte Amalie, and thus a younger brother of King Frederick IV. He never married and had no children, nor did he ever engage in any political activities. Instead he maintained a withdrawn life on his estates.

== Early life and education ==
Prince Charles was born on 26 October 1680 at Copenhagen Castle as the fourth son of Christian V and his consort Queen Charlotte Amalie. As was the tradition at the court, his upbringing was left to others, including Johan Georg Holstein, who was replaced by Carl Ahlefeldt as his hofmeister in 1696. In particular Christian Siegfried von Plessen was charged with his upbringing.

Prince Charles suffered from weak health and was hard of hearing. In order to benefit from a milder climate he was sent to France and Italy on a study trip from 1696 to 1699, spending most of the time in Montpellier. On the journey he was accompanied by Carl Adolph von Plessen, the son of his mentor, and only three years his senior. Von Plessen would remain a close friend and companion of the prince for the rest of his life, with title of first hoffmeister and later chamberlain.

Prince Charles was never married. Between 1697 and 1699, there was a Danish policy to create an alliance with Sweden through a double wedding between Charles XII of Sweden and Princess Sophia Hedwig of Denmark, and Prince Charles of Denmark and Hedvig Sophia of Sweden (after the marriage of Hedvig Sophia of Sweden in 1698, she was replaced by Ulrika Eleonora of Sweden). However, none of the marriages was materialized.

== Land owner and horse breeder ==
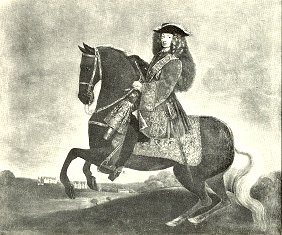
Prince Charles mounted on one of his horses.

Back in Denmark Prince Charles settled at Jægerspris Castle which he was given by his older brother, now King Frederick IV of Denmark since his ascent to the throne. He immediately embarked on a major extension of the castle and passionately fond of horses, an interest he shared with his father and brother, he also founded a stud farm on the estate.

From his mother, who died in 1715, he inherited Vemmetofte Manor and Højstrup Manors on Zealand and Charlottenborg Palace in Copenhagen. His holdings also included a pleasure garden in Copenhagen located outside the city's Northern City Gate. It was known as Prinsens Have (English: The Prince's Garden) and later Blågård (English: Blue Farm), a name which is commemorated in several toponyms today.

== Late years at Vemmetofte Manor ==
When Frederick IV had his wife by bigamy, Anne Sophie Reventlow, crowned as his queen, it led to a breach between the two brothers, and together with Princess Sophia Hedwig, his three years older sister, Prince Charles took up permanent residence at Vemmetofte Manor where they maintained an extravagant household.

Von Plessen enjoyed such a reputation for exercising such a great influence on the prince that on one occasion it prompted the king to exclaim "Well there comes Prince Plessen with my brother Charles!" Ultimately, the two brothers were reconciled and in the end Prince Charles even ended up godfathering one of the king's children by Anne Sophie. After suffering from weak health throughout his life, Charles died in 1729 and was interred at Roskilde Cathedral.

== Ancestry ==
Ancestors of Prince Charles of Denmark

16. Frederick II of Denmark
8. Christian IV of Denmark
17. Sophie of Mecklenburg-Schwerin
4. Frederick III of Denmark
18. Joachim Frederick, Margrave of Brandenburg
9. Anne Catherine of Brandenburg
19. Margravine Catherine of Brandenburg-Küstrin
2. Christian V of Denmark
20. William, Duke of Brunswick-Lüneburg
10. George, Duke of Brunswick-Lüneburg
21. Princess Dorothea of Denmark
5. Sophie Amalie of Brunswick-Lüneburg
22. Louis V, Landgrave of Hesse-Darmstadt
11. Landgravine Anne Eleonore of Hesse-Darmstadt
23. Margravine Magdalene of Brandenburg
1. Prince Charles of Denmark
24. Maurice, Landgrave of Hesse-Kassel
12. William V, Landgrave of Hesse-Kassel
25. Countess Agnes of Solms-Laubach
6. William VI, Landgrave of Hesse-Kassel
26. Philipp Ludwig II, Count of Hanau-Münzenberg
13. Countess Amalie Elisabeth of Hanau-Münzenberg
27. Countess Catharina Belgica of Nassau
3. Charlotte Amalie of Hesse-Kassel
28. John Sigismund, Elector of Brandenburg
14. George William, Elector of Brandenburg
29. Duchess Anna of Prussia
7. Margravine Hedwig Sophie of Brandenburg
30. Frederick IV, Elector Palatine
15. Countess Palatine Elizabeth Charlotte of Simmern
31. Countess Louise Juliana of Nassau
