= Prince William of Denmark =

Danish prince, son of King Christian V

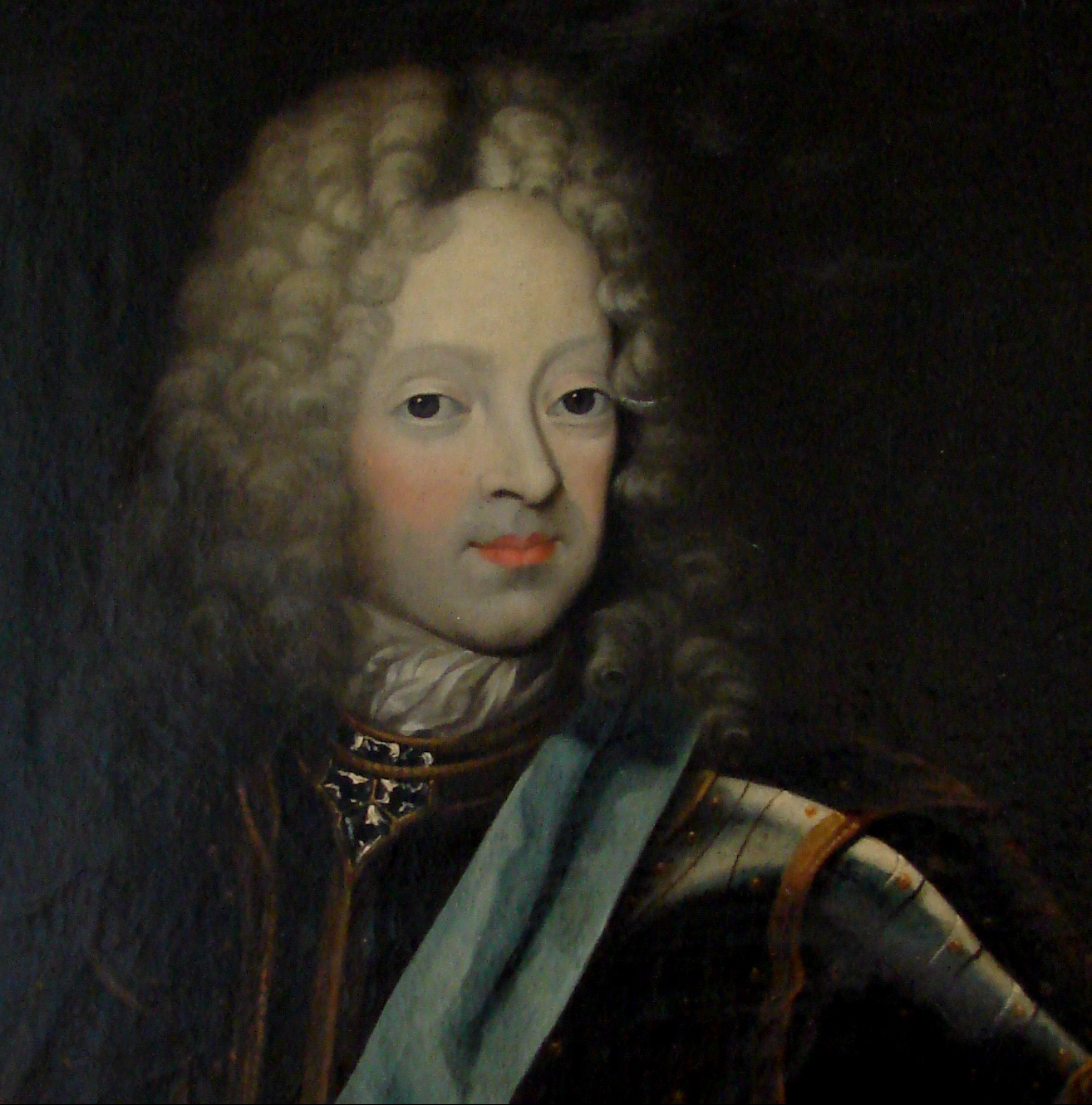
- Portrait of William c. 1695–1705
- Born: 21 February 1687; Copenhagen, Denmark
- Died: 23 November 1705 (aged 18); Copenhagen, Denmark
- Burial: Roskilde Cathedral
- House: Oldenburg
- Father: Christian V of Denmark
- Mother: Charlotte Amalie of Hesse-Kassel
- Religion: Lutheranism

Prince William of Denmark and Norway or Prince Vilhelm (21 February 1687 – 23 November 1705) was the youngest son of Christian V of Denmark and Charlotte Amalie of Hesse-Kassel, and thus a younger brother of Frederick IV.

In 1696, Joachim Pritzbuer, who was replaced in 1705 by Martin Balthasar von Waldersee, was appointed Vilhelm's chamberlain. The latter was to accompany the prince on his great voyage abroad to Utrecht, the Spanish Netherlands, France, Italy and England. The instructions for Waldersee and the prince's secretary and teacher Johan Ernst Carlowitz are dated 2 October, but soon after, Vilhelm fell ill and died on 23 November at Copenhagen Castle.

== Ancestry ==
Ancestors of Prince William of Denmark

8. Christian IV of Denmark
4. Frederick III of Denmark
9. Anne Catherine of Brandenburg
2. Christian V of Denmark
10. George, Duke of Brunswick-Lüneburg
5. Sophie Amalie of Brunswick-Lüneburg
11. Landgravine Anne Eleonore of Hesse-Darmstadt
1. Prince William of Denmark
12. William V, Landgrave of Hesse-Kassel
6. William VI, Landgrave of Hesse-Kassel
13. Countess Amalie Elisabeth of Hanau-Münzenberg
3. Charlotte Amalie of Hesse-Kassel
14. George William, Elector of Brandenburg
7. Margravine Hedwig Sophie of Brandenburg
15. Countess Palatine Elizabeth Charlotte of Simmern
