= Charlotte Amalie of Hesse-Kassel =

Queen of Denmark and Norway from 1670 to 1699

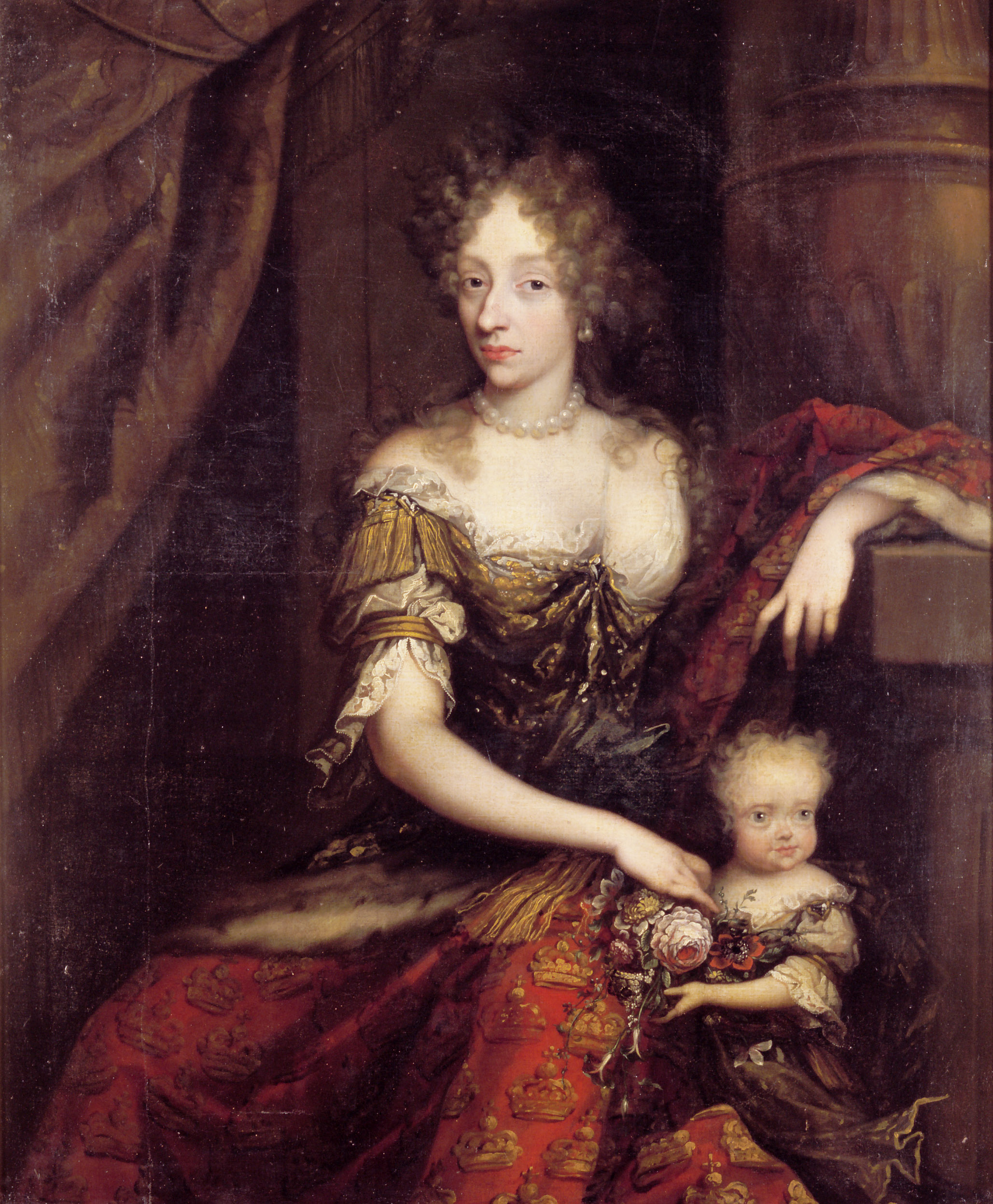
- Charlotte Amalie with a court dwarf, by Jacques d'Agar, c. 1690

Queen consort of Denmark and Norway
- Tenure: 9 February 1670 – 25 August 1699
- Born: 27 April 1650; Kassel, Hesse-Kassel, Holy Roman Empire (Germany)
- Died: 27 March 1714 (aged 63); Copenhagen, Denmark
- Burial: Roskilde Cathedral
- Spouse: Christian V of Denmark (m. 1667; died 1699)
- Issue among others...: Frederick IV; Prince Christian; Princess Sophia Hedwig; Prince Charles; Prince William
- House: Hesse-Kassel
- Father: William VI, Landgrave of Hesse-Kassel
- Mother: Hedwig Sophia of Brandenburg

Charlotte Amalie of Hesse-Kassel (27 April 1650 – 27 March 1714) was Queen of Denmark and Norway by marriage to King Christian V. Although she did not have much political influence, she was a successful businesswoman in her many estates and protected foreign Protestant non-Lutherans from oppression. She gained popularity for defending Copenhagen from Swedish forces in 1700. The city of Charlotte Amalie was named after her in 1691.

== Early life ==
Charlotte Amalie was born on 27 April 1650, in Kassel, Hesse, Germany. Her parents were William VI, Landgrave of Hesse-Kassel and Hedwig Sophia of Brandenburg. Her mother was a religiously strict adherent of the Reformed Church and politically oriented toward Brandenburg, both views which were to be shared by her daughter. She was well educated in finances, geography, the languages German, French and Italian, and philosophy. French was to be her preferred written language, though she spoke German with her more intimate friends.

Crown Prince Christian of Denmark and Norway was sent to meet Charlotte Amalie in Hesse in 1665 as a marriage prospect arranged by Danish Queen Sophie Amalie, who desired a daughter-in-law that she could control and expected this to be the case for a member of the reformed church who would be religiously isolated in Lutheran Denmark. However, the negotiations were drawn out because of religious concerns. In the marriage contract, Charlotte Amalie was not required to convert and managed to secure the right to keep her faith after her wedding to Christian, who as ruler of Denmark would become the head of the state Lutheran Church, a term which was contested and met some resistance before it was accepted.

== Crown Princess ==
The marriage was on 15 June 1667 in Nykøbing Slot. Charlotte Amalie was appreciated for learning the Danish language, which was not a given thing for a royal consort in that era and which she mastered prior to becoming Queen. It was said of her that she:

"...willingly and completely loves not only our people but also our language, which she has learned to speak to our people before even ascending the throne, while bringing shame on those who have been eating our bread for thirty years and not bothered to learn even thirty Danish words."

Much to the distress of her mother-in-law, Charlotte Amalie actually was a lively, smart and independent woman. She was not a meek person and made her pleasure and displeasure quite openly known, though her anger was also quickly subdued. The English ambassador Robert Molesworth, 1st Viscount Molesworth called her "A Princess worthy of being described with honor, even if she did not have such a high position. [...] very winning, lovable and unconstrained," while the French ambassador described her: "This lady has pale skin and brown hair. While not beautiful, nether is there anything ugly about her. She has a fine figure and a pleasant personality. She speaks quite good French, and her conversation shows that she has plenty of mind."

== Queen of Denmark and Norway ==
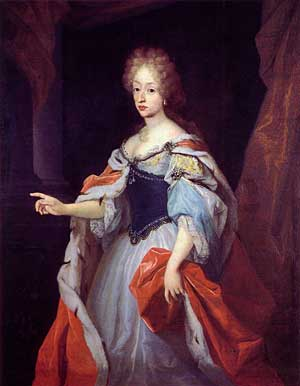
Portrait of Charlotte Amalie as queen by an unidentified artist, c. 17th century.

Charlotte Amalie became Queen of Denmark and Norway upon the accession of Christian to the throne in 1670. Her Reformed faith caused the clergy to oppose her anointing as Queen because the ceremony would require a Lutheran communion, which she refused. She chose the motto L'homme propose, Dieu dispose and was described as a popular queen. According to English ambassador Molesworth:

"Her great excellence assures her of the hearts of her subjects, even though she doesn't share their religion. [...] she is an safe haven for the suffering destitute, who are never disappointed when appealing to her."

=== Influence ===
Royal Monogram of Queen Charlotte Amalie of Denmark.

King Christian V disliked his wife's Pro-Brandenburg sympathies and took care to remove Charlotte Amalie from exerting any influence in state affairs. She was nevertheless regarded as a potential power holder at court, and the French ambassador noted: "While the queen has little influence, the favorite ministers does fear her, as they know how much she despise them". After the fall of Peder Griffenfeld in 1676, her main political enemies were represented by her mother-in-law, who worked to maintain her political influence, and courtier Vincens Hahn, who belonged to royal mistress Sophie Amalie Moth's social circle. Spy Justine Cathrine Rosenkrantz was placed among her ladies-in-waiting by the Hahn party to ascertain that Charlotte Amalie did not involve herself in politics.

Even if she could achieve little without the support of the king, Charlotte Amalie tried to press political issues on her own. During the Scanian War (1675–1679), her husband allied with her uncle, the Elector of Brandenburg, against Sweden. She actively worked to preserve the alliance and benefit Brandenburg interests in Denmark "in occasions when this wouldn't have been expected by a queen of Denmark". It is noted how she protected the Brandenburgian military Tromp and disfavored Danish rival Niels Juel.

A rich landowner, Charlotte Amalie owned and actively managed several estates around the country, including Frederiksdal, Bagsværd, Dronninglund, Dronninggaard, Gentofte Gaard, Vendsyssel Børglum Kloster, Stevns Herred, Frøslev Gods, and Vemmetofte Gods. She founded and skillfully supervised factories in some of her estates, such as paper mills and playing cards factories. Both her lands goods and industry products resulted in considerable profits.

Although Charlotte Amalie was pious, her view on religion was a Protestant ecumenical one: she corresponded with Protestants of different churches and expressed that she saw little difference between the Reformed church and the Lutheran faith, a view which was radical at the time. She protected the members of the Reformed church in Denmark, particularly the Huguenots, where they were benefited by her protection. This included the family of her secretary and advisor Johann Heinrich Lincker, who was married to Huguenot woman named Susanne du Mont. She was supported in her tolerance by businesspeople, who saw the need of the qualifications of the immigrants, and was opposed by the conservative church, who regarded all non-Lutherans as an affront to the King and God, a view which her husband did lean somewhat towards himself. The law of 1685, in which immigrants of Protestant of churches were granted the privilege of a certain degree of freedom of religion, are attributed to the efforts of Charlotte Amalie, who served as the spokesperson of the foreign Protestant non-Lutherans. She supported the foundation of one French and one German Protestant church with her own funds, even including the congregations in her will.

=== Court of the Queen ===
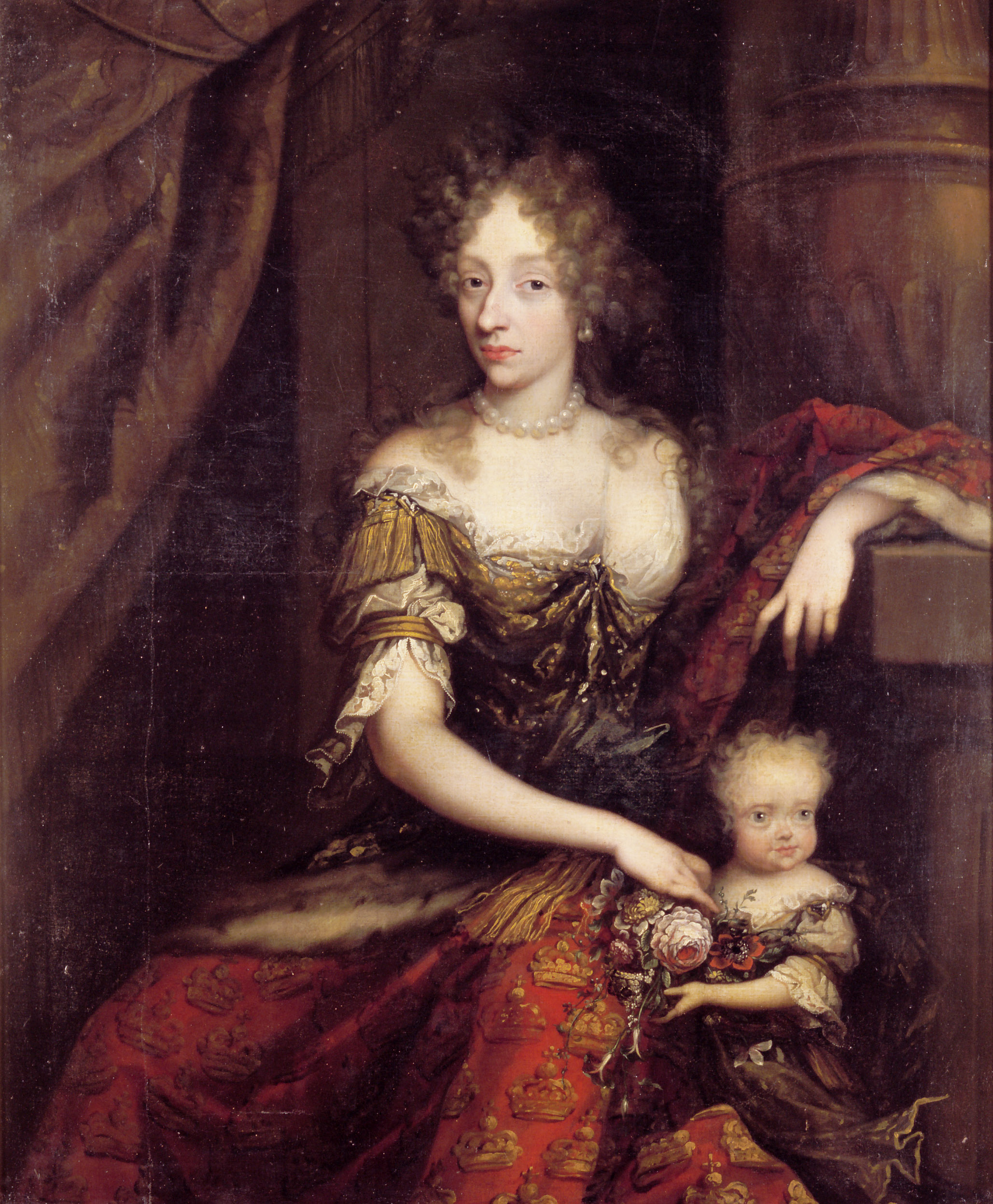
Charlotte Amalie of Hesse-Kassel with her court dwarf in 1690.

Charlotte Amalie enjoyed the frequent courtly parties, balls, masquerades and representation which court life demanded, brushing away the strict religious scruples voiced by her sister-in-law Ulrika Eleonora as nonsense. She sometimes arranged private parties herself, such as the spontaneously for her court dwarf Frøken Elsebe. Described as charming and entertaining in social life, the Queen had many friends, such as Juliane Elisabeth von Wallenstein, Dorothea Justina Haxthausen and, particularly, her favorite lady-in-waiting and Huguenot relative princess Charlotte Amélie de la Trémoille.

The relationship between Charlotte Amalie and Christian V are described as a mutually respectful friendship instead of a love affair, but both enjoyed each other's company and coexisted harmoniously. In 1672, her husband entered into a permanent love affair to Sophie Amalie Moth, who made the official mistress in Denmark, a public adultery that caused an embarrassing situation for Charlotte Amalie. Nevertheless, "no mistress could deprive her of her position as Queen, and she understood how to defend it"; Charlotte Amalie made the most of her position as Queen, both in public representational life as in her private interactions with the King. It is noted how she was always accompanied him on journeys, on hunting, in warfare, and even at playing cards late in to the evenings. She was present during the Battle of Wismar, riding at the King's side "dressed as an amazon", and accompanied her husband in Sweden during the Scanian War.

Charlotte Amalie is described as a devoted and considered mother and grandmother who was close to her family. However, she did not have a good relationship with her mother-in-law, who wished to keep her precedence and position as first lady of the court despite being a queen dowager. One reason for the animosity was because she unsuccessfully requested the release of her aunt-in-law Leonora Christina Ulfeldt, and were known to have sent gifts to ease Ulfeldt's imprisonment, something which was resented by her mother-in-law, who regarded Ulfeldt a personal enemy.

== Queen Dowager ==
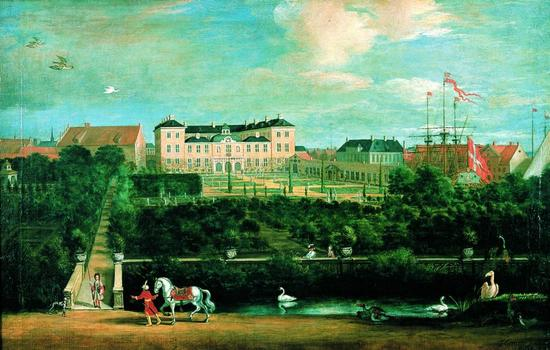
Charlottenborg Palace, Dowager Queen Charlotte Amelie's winter residence.

In 1699, Charlotte Amalie was widowed. She did not threaten the position of her daughter-in-law at court as her mother-in-law had done. It is reported that she grieved over her son's bigamy, but she did not voice any criticism to him directly. She kept a separate court and made several journeys, particularly to Germany, where she spent 1711–1713 in Oldenburg. The Queen Dowager resided in Charlottenborg Palace, which is named after her, during the winter and in Nykøbing Slot during the summer. She was protector of the famous Marie Grubbe after Grubbe's divorce and remarriage, which had made the new couple social outcasts. They were given refuge by the queen dowager, who allowed them to live in her own dower lands.

In 1700, Copenhagen was attacked by King Charles XII of Sweden during the invasion Zealand. On 13 July, Charlotte Amalie wrote to her friend Dorothea Justina Haxthausen: "I have the pleasure – or if you wish, the opposite – of seeing the fleets of four potentates outside my window. I hope they will disperse without bloodshed", when the Danish fleet was attacked by the Swedish, English and Dutch fleet, followed by the landing of the enemy at Humlebæk. The capital was unprepared for attack, the King was absent in the Duchies, and the city commander Schack could not handle the situation. During this incident, the Queen Dowager strengthened the resolve of the people and helped to organize the defense by convincing the city commandant to give the people access to the cannons and successfully asking the garrison to protect the capital out of loyalty, while she would herself stay and die with them if need be. For this act, she was hailed as a heroine.

Charlotte Amalie died of scarlet fever in Charlottenborg on 27 March 1714, at the age of 63. She was "heartily grieved by many". and buried in Roskilde Cathedral. Her winter residence has housed the Royal Danish Academy of Art since 1754.

== Legacy ==
The city of Charlotte Amalie on St. Thomas, U.S. Virgin Islands is named after her.

== Issue ==
Name	Birth	Death
Frederick IV	11 October 1671	12 October 1730
Christian Vilhelm	1 December 1672	25 January 1673
Christian	25 March 1675	27 June 1695
Sophie Hedevig	28 August 1677	13 March 1735
Christiane Charlotte	18 January 1679	24 August 1689
Charles	26 October 1680	8 June 1729
Daughter	17 July 1683	17 July 1683
Vilhelm	21 February 1687	23 November 1705

== Ancestry ==
Ancestors of Charlotte Amalie of Hesse-Kassel

8. Maurice, Landgrave of Hesse-Kassel
4. William V, Landgrave of Hesse-Kassel
9. Countess Agnes of Solms-Laubach
2. William VI, Landgrave of Hesse-Kassel
10. Philip Louis II, Count of Hanau-Münzenberg
5. Countess Amalie Elisabeth of Hanau-Münzenberg
11. Countess Catharina Belgica of Nassau
1. Charlotte Amalie of Hesse-Kassel
12. John Sigismund, Elector of Brandenburg
6. George William, Elector of Brandenburg
13. Duchess Anna of Prussia
3. Princess Hedwig Sophie of Brandenburg
14. Frederick IV, Elector Palatine
7. Countess Palatine Elizabeth Charlotte of Simmern
15. Countess Louise Juliana of Nassau

== See also ==
- Reformed Synod of Denmark

Charlotte Amalie of Hesse-Kassel House of Hesse-Kassel Cadet branch of the House of Hesse Born: 27 April 1650 Died: 27 March 1714
Danish royalty
Preceded by Sophie Amalie of Brunswick-Lüneburg	Queen consort of Denmark and Norway; 1670–1699	Succeeded by Louise of Mecklenburg-Güstrow
