= Christian V of Denmark =

King of Denmark and Norway from 1670 to 1699

Christian V
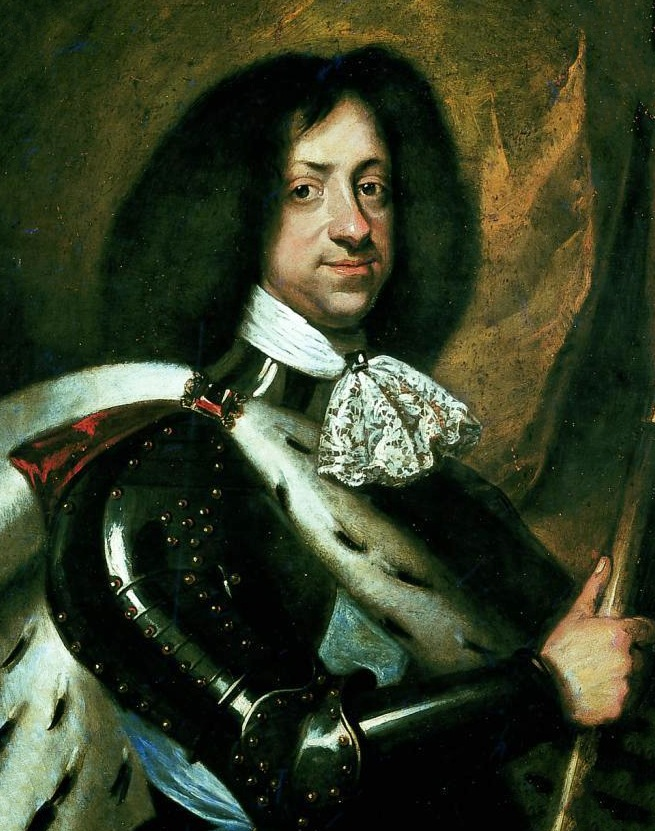
- Portrait of Christian V by Karel van Mander III

King of Denmark and Norway
- Reign: 9 February 1670 – 25 August 1699
- Coronation: 7 June 1671; Frederiksborg Palace Chapel
- Predecessor: Frederick III
- Successor: Frederick IV
- Grand Chancellors: See list: Peder Griffenfeld Frederik Ahlefeldt
- Born: 15 April 1646; Duborg Castle, Flensburg, Denmark
- Died: 25 August 1699 (aged 53); Copenhagen, Denmark
- Burial: Roskilde Cathedral
- Spouse: Charlotte Amalie of Hesse-Kassel (m. 1667)
- Issue among others...: Frederick IV; Prince Christian; Princess Sophia Hedwig; Prince Charles; Prince William; Christian Gyldenløve (illegitimate)
- House: Oldenburg
- Father: Frederick III of Denmark
- Mother: Sophie Amalie of Brunswick-Lüneburg
- Religion: Lutheran

Christian V (15 April 1646 – 25 August 1699) was King of Denmark and Norway from 1670 until his death in 1699.

Well-regarded by the common people, he was the first king anointed at Frederiksborg Castle chapel as absolute monarch since the decree that institutionalized the supremacy of the king in Denmark–Norway. Christian fortified the absolutist system against the aristocracy by accelerating his father's practice of allowing both Holstein nobles and Danish and Norwegian commoners into state service.

As king, he wanted to show his power as absolute monarch through architecture, and dreamed of a Danish Versailles. He was the first to use the 1671 Throne Chair of Denmark, partly made for this purpose. His motto was: Pietate et Justitia (With piety and justice).

== Biography ==
=== Early years ===
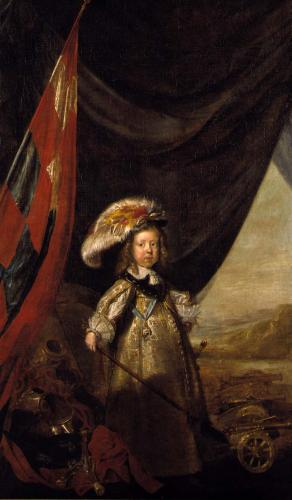
Christian V portrayed as the prince elect in the year 1650, in a painting by Karel van Mander III

Prince Christian was born on 15 April 1646 at Duborg Castle in the city of Flensburg, then located in the Duchy of Schleswig. He was the first legitimate child born to the then Prince Frederick of Denmark by his consort, Sophie Amalie of Brunswick-Calenberg. Prince Frederick was a younger son of King Christian IV, but the death of his elder brother Christian, Prince-Elect of Denmark in June 1647 opened the possibility for Frederick to be elected heir apparent to the Danish throne.

After the death of King Christian IV in 1648, Frederick thus became King of Denmark and Norway as Frederick III. Prince Christian was elected successor to his father in June 1650. This was not a free choice, but de facto automatic hereditary succession. Escorted by his chamberlain Christoffer Parsberg, Christian went on a long trip abroad, to Holland, England, France, and home through Germany. On this trip, he saw absolutism in its most splendid achievement at the young Louis XIV's court, and heard about the theory of the divine right of kings. He returned to Denmark in August 1663. From 1664 he was allowed to attend proceedings of the State College. Hereditary succession was made official by Royal Law in 1665. Christian was hailed as heir in Copenhagen in August 1665, in Odense and Viborg in September, and in Christiania, Norway in July 1666. Only a short time before he became king, he was taken into the Council of the Realm and the Supreme Court.

=== Accession ===
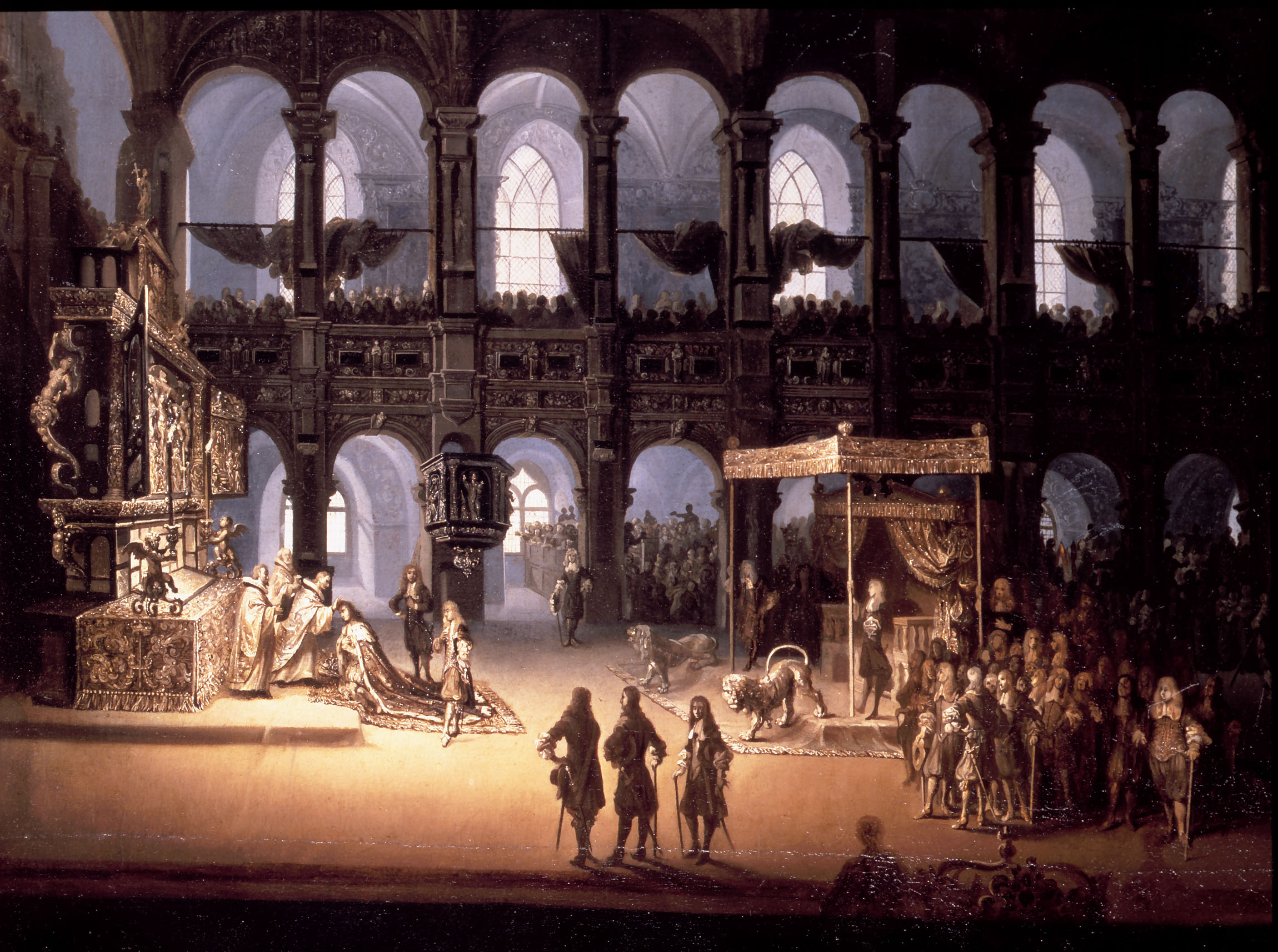
The anointing of Christian V in the chapel of Frederiksborg Palace in 1671.

On 9 February 1670, King Frederick III died at the age of 60 at the Copenhagen Castle after a reign of 22 years. At the death of his father, Christian immediately ascended the thrones of Denmark and Norway as the second absolute monarch at the age of 24. He was formally crowned on 7 June the following year in the chapel of Frederiksborg Palace, which thereafter became the traditional place of coronation of Denmark's monarchs during the absolute monarchy. He was the first hereditary king of Denmark–Norway, and in honor of this, Denmark–Norway acquired expensive new crown jewels and a new ceremonial sword.

=== Reign ===
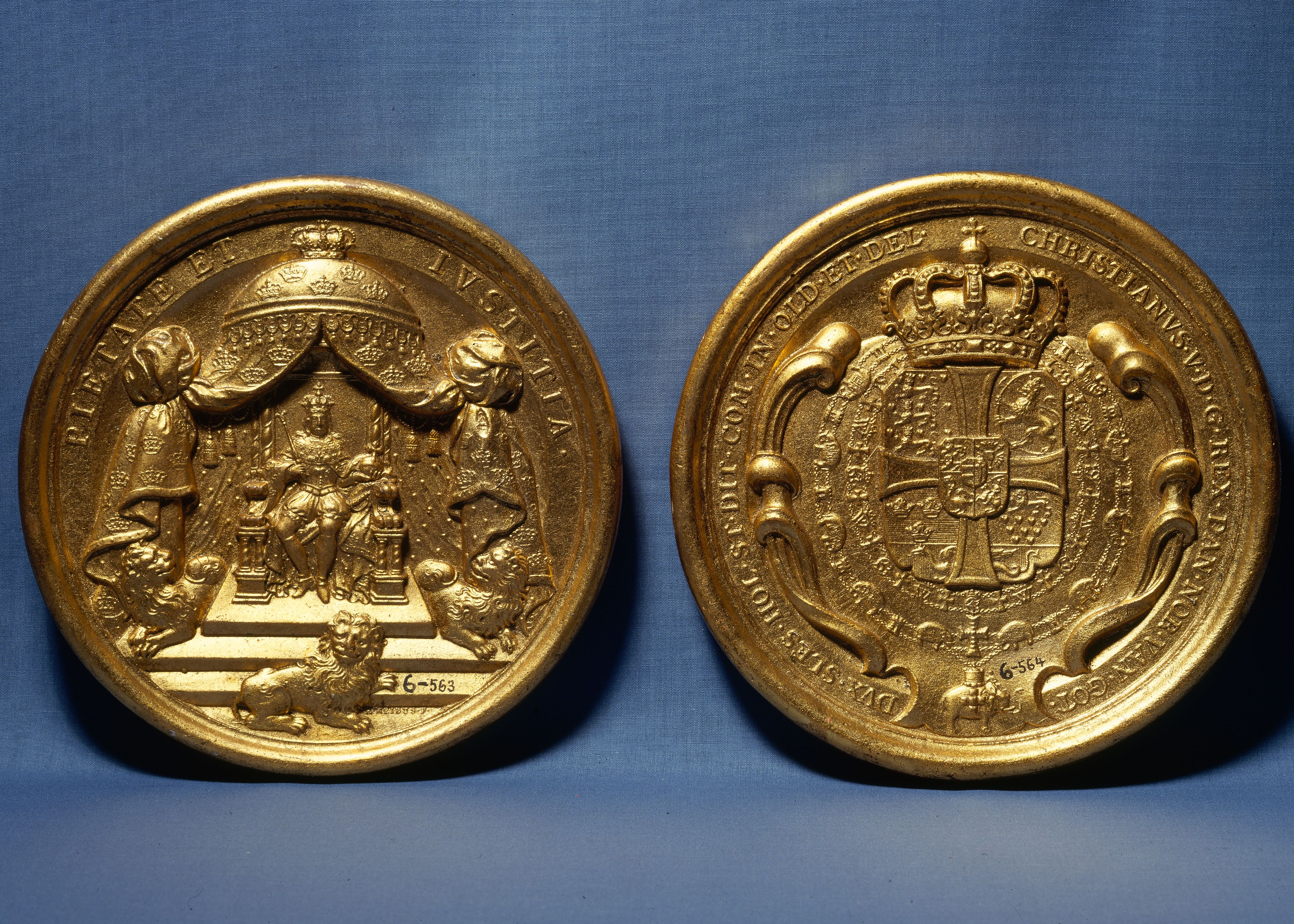
Seal of Christian V.

It is generally argued that Christian V's personal courage and affability made him popular among the common people, but his image was marred by his unsuccessful attempt to regain Scania for Denmark in the Scanian War. The war exhausted Denmark's economic resources without securing any gains. Part of Christian's appeal to the common people may be explained by the fact that he allowed Danish and Norwegian commoners into state service, but his attempts to curtail the influence of the nobility also meant continuing his father's drive toward absolutism. To accommodate non-aristocrats into state service, he created the new noble ranks of count and baron. One of the commoners elevated in this way by the king was Peder Schumacher, named Count of Griffenfeld by Christian V in 1670 and high councillor of Denmark in 1674.

Griffenfeld, a skilled statesman, better understood the precarious situation Denmark–Norway placed itself by attacking Sweden at a time when the country was allied with France, the major European power of the era. After some hesitation, Christian V initiated the Scanian War (1675–1679) against Sweden in an attempt to reconquer Scania which Denmark had lost under the Treaty of Roskilde in 1658. As Griffenfeld predicted, Sweden's stronger ally France was the party that dictated the peace with Denmark's ally the Netherlands, and in spite of Danish victory at sea in the battles against Sweden in 1675–1679 during the Scanian War, Danish hopes for border changes on the Scandinavian Peninsula between the two countries were dashed. The results of the war efforts proved politically and financially unremunerative for Denmark–Norway. The damage to the Danish-Norwegian economy was extensive. At this point, Christian V no longer had his most experienced foreign relations counsel around to repair the political damage — in 1676 he had been persuaded to sacrifice Griffenfeld as a traitor, and to the clamour of his adversaries, Griffenfeld was imprisoned for the remainder of his life.

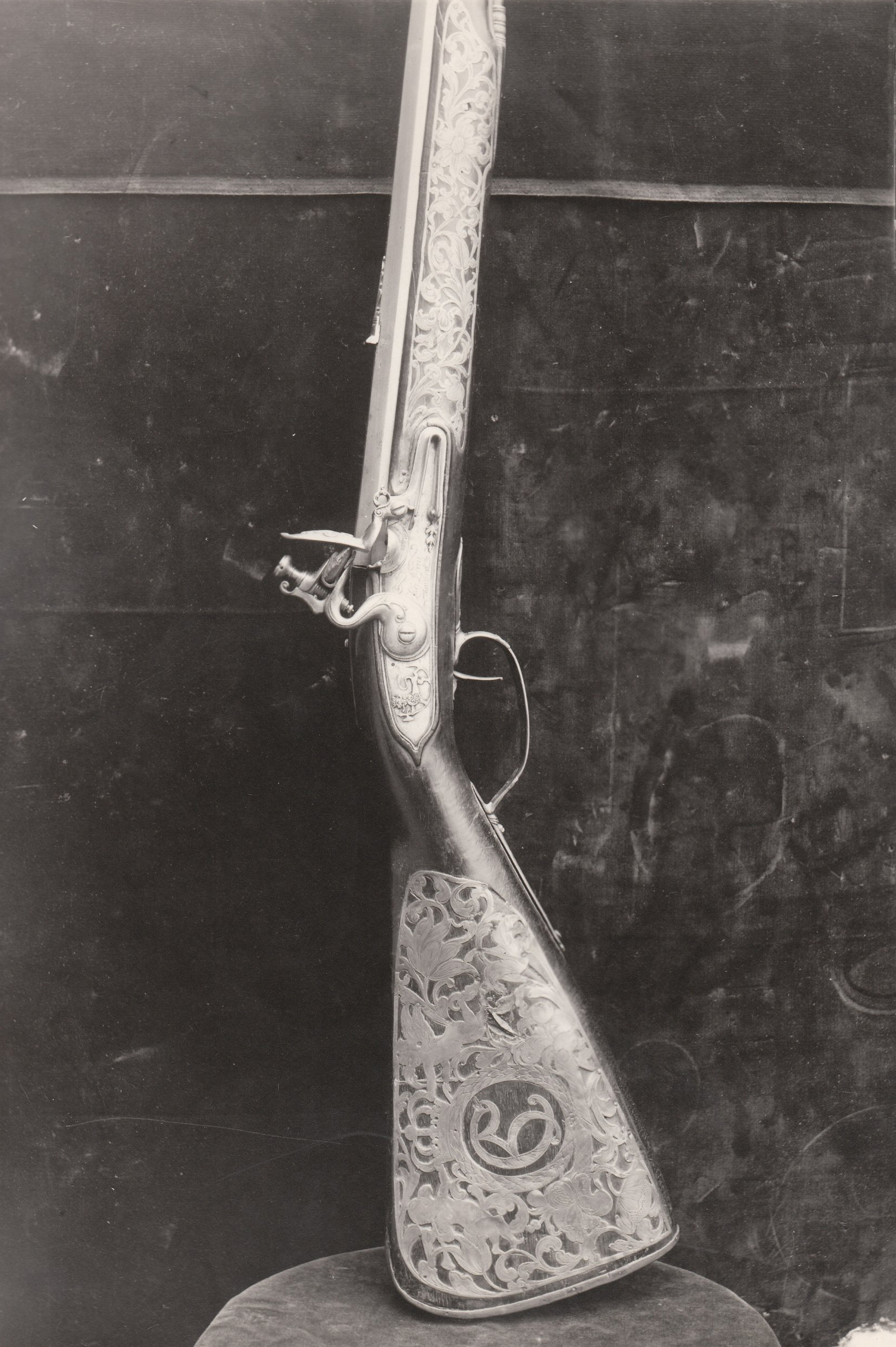
King Christian V's rifle made by Trondheim's weapon-maker Lars Berg.

After the Scanian War, his sister, Princess Ulrike Eleonora of Denmark, married Swedish king Charles XI, whose mother was a stout supporter of the Duke of Holstein-Gottorp. In spite of the family ties, war between the brothers-in-law was close again in 1689, when Charles XI nearly provoked confrontation with Denmark–Norway by his support of the exiled Christian Albert, Duke of Holstein-Gottorp in his claims to Holstein-Gottorp in Schleswig-Holstein.

Like Charles XI of Sweden, who had never been outside Sweden, Christian V spoke only German and Danish and was therefore often considered poorly educated due to his inability to communicate with visiting foreign diplomats. Christian V was also often considered dependent on his councillors by contemporary sources. The Danish monarch did nothing to dispel this notion. In his memoirs, he listed "hunting, love-making, war and maritime affairs" as his main interests in life.

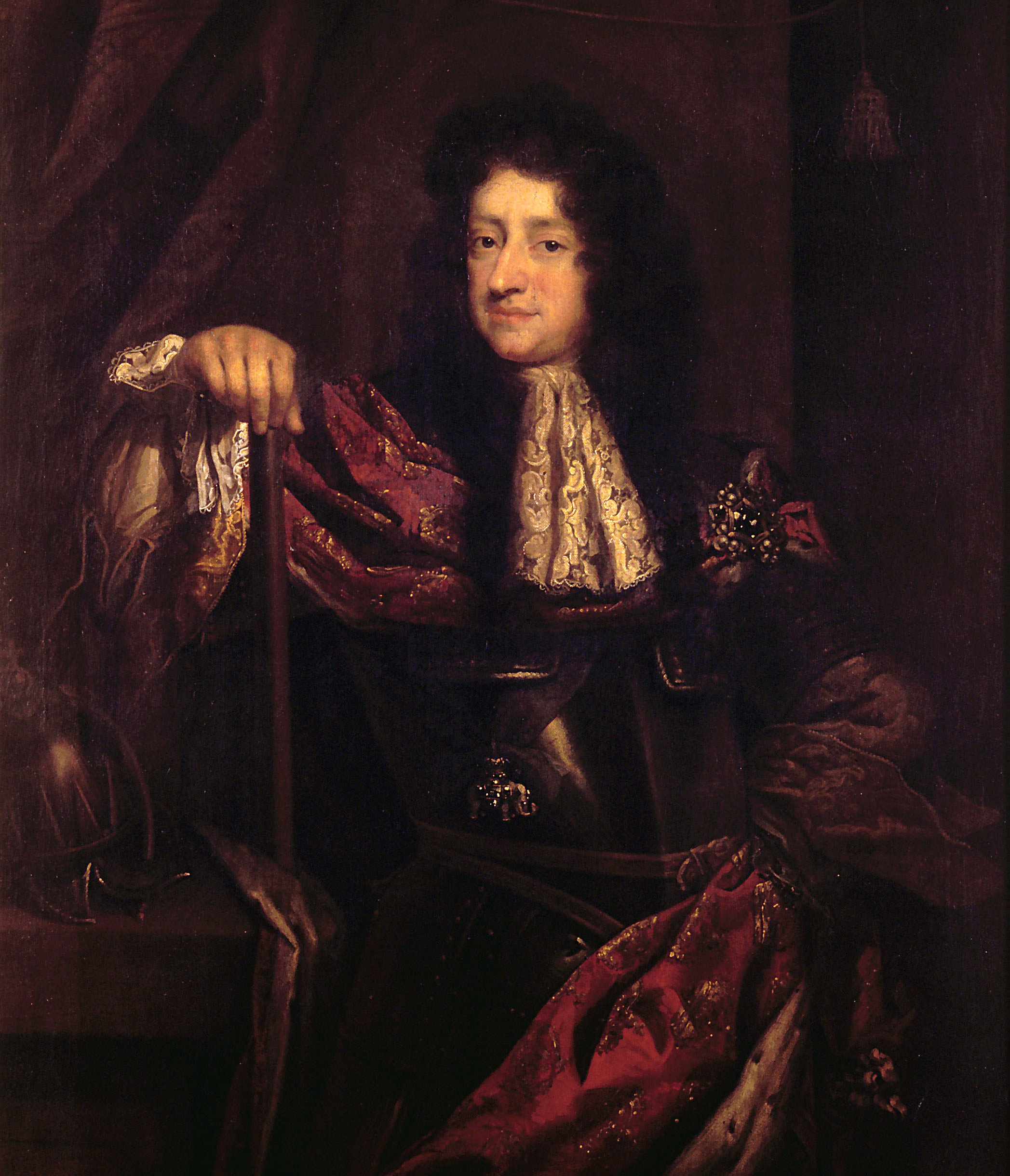
Portrait of Christian V by Jacob d'Agar

Christian V introduced the Danish Code (Danske Lov) in 1683, the first law code for all of Denmark. He also introduced the similar Norske Lov (Norwegian Code) of 1687 to replace Christian IVs Norwegian Code from 1604 in Norway. He also introduced the land register of 1688, which attempted to work out the land value of the united monarchy in order to create a more just taxation.

During the reign of Christian V, Denmark's trade in cattle that had declined due to catastrophic fires and wars had been restored, and livestock and crop exports had also surpassed those under Frederick III, with thousands of cattle entering and leaving Jutland through the Oxen Way. After entering and fattening in the Danish King's German enclave County of Oldenburg, the cattle reached the big market in Wedel. From there, cattle were resold to all parts of North Germany via Stade, Hamburg and Lübeck. As the population continued to soar at the end of the seventeenth century, demand for beef, grains and fish increased, both throughout North Germany and on the Baltic coast alone. In terms of the number of livestock shipped to the South, in 1680 each market had reached 40,000 cattle. Traditional export commodities, including fish and grains, increased their exports since the beginning of the seventeenth century. The agricultural products exported by Denmark, especially cattle, made a lot of money from Germany and the Netherlands for the Danish royal family, the aristocrats and the town residents. During his reign, science witnessed a golden age due to the work of the astronomer Ole Rømer in spite of the king's personal lack of scientific knowledge and interest. He died from the after-effects of a hunting accident and was interred in Roskilde Cathedral.

=== Family ===
Christian V had eight children by his wife and six by his Maîtresse-en-titre, Sophie Amalie Moth (1654–1719), whom he took up with when she was sixteen. Sophie was the daughter of his former tutor Poul Moth. Christian publicly introduced Sophie into court in 1672, a move which insulted his wife, and made her countess of Samsø on 31 December 1677.

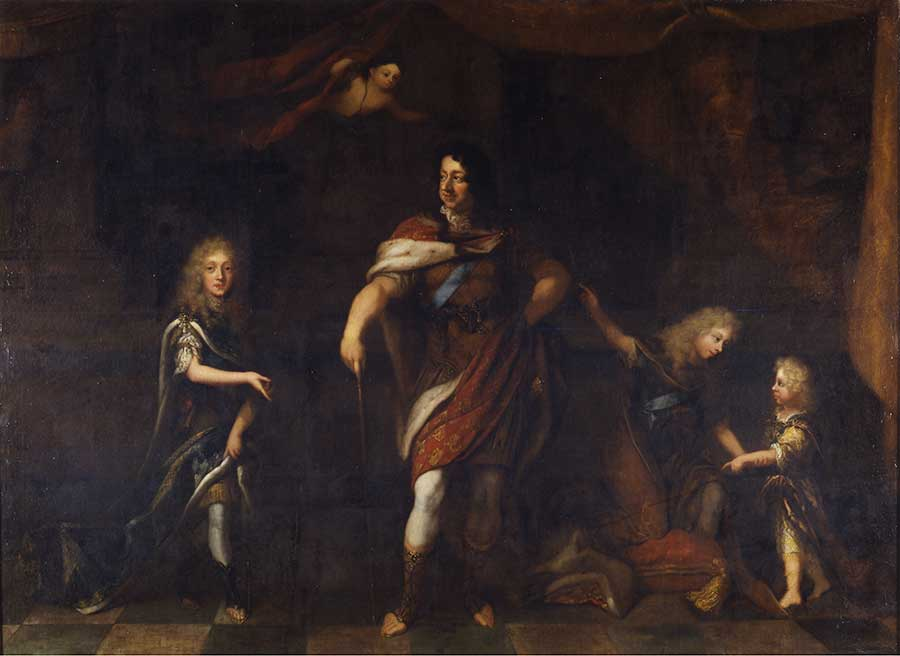
Christian V with his eldest son crown-prince Frederick (IV), and his other sons Christian and Charles

Legitimate children by his queen Charlotte Amalie:

| Name | Birth | Death | Notes |
|---|---|---|---|
| Frederick IV | 2 October 1671 | 12 October 1730 |
| Christian Vilhelm | 1 December 1672 | 25 January 1673 | died in infancy |
| Christian | 25 March 1675 | 27 June 1695 |
| Sophie Hedwig | 28 August 1677 | 13 March 1735 |
| Christiane Charlotte | 18 January 1679 | 24 August 1689 | died young at age 11 |
| Charles | 26 October 1680 | 8 June 1729 |
| Daughter | 17 July 1683 | 17 July 1683 |
| Vilhelm | 21 February 1687 | 23 November 1705 |

Illegitimate children by his mistress, Sophie Amalie Moth, Countess of Samsø:

| Name | Birth | Death |
|---|---|---|
| Christiane Gyldenløve | 7 July 1672 | 12 September 1689 |
| Christian Gyldenløve | 28 February 1674 | 16 July 1703 |
| Sophie Christiane Gyldenløve | 1675 | 18 August 1684 |
| Anna Christiane Gyldenløve | 1676 | 11 August 1689 |
| Ulrik Christian Gyldenløve | 24 June 1678 | 8 December 1719 |
| Daughter | 1682 | 8 July 1684 |

== Arms ==
Heraldry of Christian V of Denmark–Norway
| Christian V's crown, produced in 1671 | Royal Monogram | Coat of arms as King |

== Ancestry ==
Ancestors of Christian V of Denmark

8. Frederick II of Denmark
4. Christian IV of Denmark
9. Sophie of Mecklenburg-Güstrow
2. Frederick III of Denmark
10. Joachim Frederick, Elector of Brandenburg
5. Anne Catherine of Brandenburg
11. Catherine of Brandenburg-Küstrin
1. Christian V of Denmark
12. William the Younger, Duke of Brunswick-Lüneburg
6. George, Duke of Brunswick-Calenberg
13. Dorothea of Denmark
3. Sophie Amalie of Brunswick-Calenberg
14. Louis V, Landgrave of Hesse-Darmstadt
7. Anne Eleonore of Hesse-Darmstadt
15. Magdalene of Brandenburg

Christian V House of Oldenburg Born: 14 April 1646 Died: 25 August 1699
Regnal titles
| Preceded by Frederick III | King of Denmark and Norway; Count of Oldenburg; 1670–1699 | Succeeded by Frederick IV |
| Preceded by Frederick III of Denmark as co-ruler of Christian Albert of Gottorp | Duke of Holstein and Schleswig; 1670–1699 with Christian Albert (1670–1695); Frederick IV (1695–1699) | Succeeded by Frederick IV of Denmark as co-ruler of Frederick IV of Gottorp |
