= Karel van Mander III =

Dutch Golden Age painter

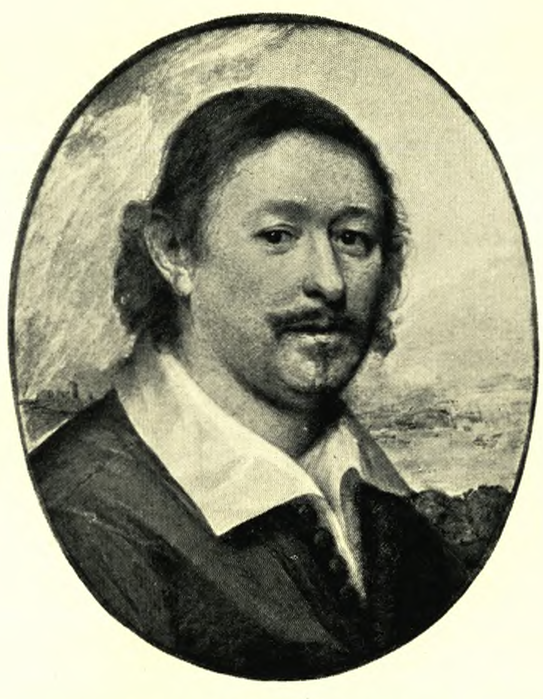
Karel van Mander III.

Self portrait with his family

Karel van Mander (1609–1670) was a Dutch Golden Age painter and the grandson of Karel van Mander.

== Biography ==
Karel van Mander III was born in Delft. According to Houbraken, who confused him with his father Karel van Mander the Younger, he learned to paint from his father and became a good portrait painter. His portrait of Christian IV was honored with a poem by Joost van den Vondel. His portrait of Vondel with gray hair in the same year was also rewarded with a Vondel poem.

According to the RKD he was a pupil of his father and was influenced by Frans Hals. He worked in Copenhagen in 1631, and travelled to Italy from 1635-1638. When he returned North he settled in Copenhagen in the company of Abraham Wuchters. He is registered in Amsterdam in 1657 (probably due to the painting mentioned by Vondel). but died in Copenhagen.
