= Sophie Amalie of Brunswick-Calenberg =

Queen of Denmark and Norway from 1648 to 1670

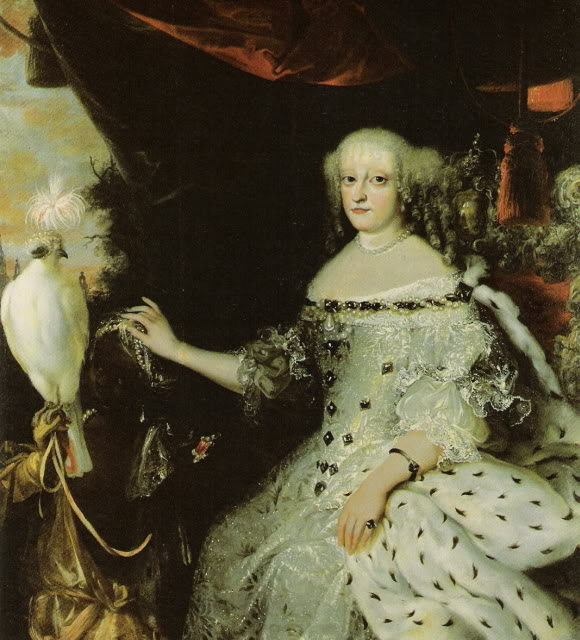
- Portrait by Abraham Wuchters, c. 1670

Queen consort of Denmark and Norway
- Tenure: 28 February 1648 – 9 February 1670
- Coronation: 23 November 1648
- Born: 24 March 1628; Herzberg Castle, Lower Saxony
- Died: 20 February 1685 (aged 56); Amalienborg Palace, Copenhagen, Denmark
- Burial: Roskilde Cathedral
- Spouse: Frederick III of Denmark (m. 1643; died 1670)
- Issue: Christian V, King of Denmark; Anna Sophia, Electress of Saxony; Frederika Amalia, Duchess of Holstein-Gottorp; Wilhelmina Ernestina, Electress Palatine; Prince George, Duke of Cumberland; Ulrika Eleonora, Queen of Sweden
- House: Hanover
- Father: George, Duke of Brunswick-Calenberg
- Mother: Anne Eleonore of Hesse-Darmstadt

Sophie Amalie of Brunswick-Calenberg (24 March 1628 – 20 February 1685) was Queen of Denmark and Norway as the consort of the King Frederick III of Denmark. She is known for her political influence, as well as for her cultural impact: she acted as the adviser of her husband, and introduced ballet and opera to Denmark.

== Life ==
=== Early life ===
Sophie Amalie was born at the Herzberg Castle, in Herzberg am Harz. Her parents were George, Duke of Brunswick-Calenberg, and Anne Eleonore of Hesse-Darmstadt. Nothing is known of her childhood.

Sophie Amalie married Prince Frederick in Castle Glücksburg on 1 October 1643. The marriage was arranged in 1640, as it was considered suitable for the current situation of the groom: he was, at that point, Prince-bishop of Bremen and not heir to the throne, and was not expected to succeed to the throne. It is believed to be a political match, though the exact purpose of it is unknown. They had eight children, including King Christian V of Denmark and Ulrike Eleonora of Denmark who married King Charles XI of Sweden.

The couple settled in Bremen. In 1646–47, they lived in humble circumstances in Flensborg, after having been forced to flee Bremen during the war between Denmark–Norway and Sweden. In 1647, Frederick was elected heir to the Danish throne, and the following year, she followed him to Denmark.

=== Queen ===
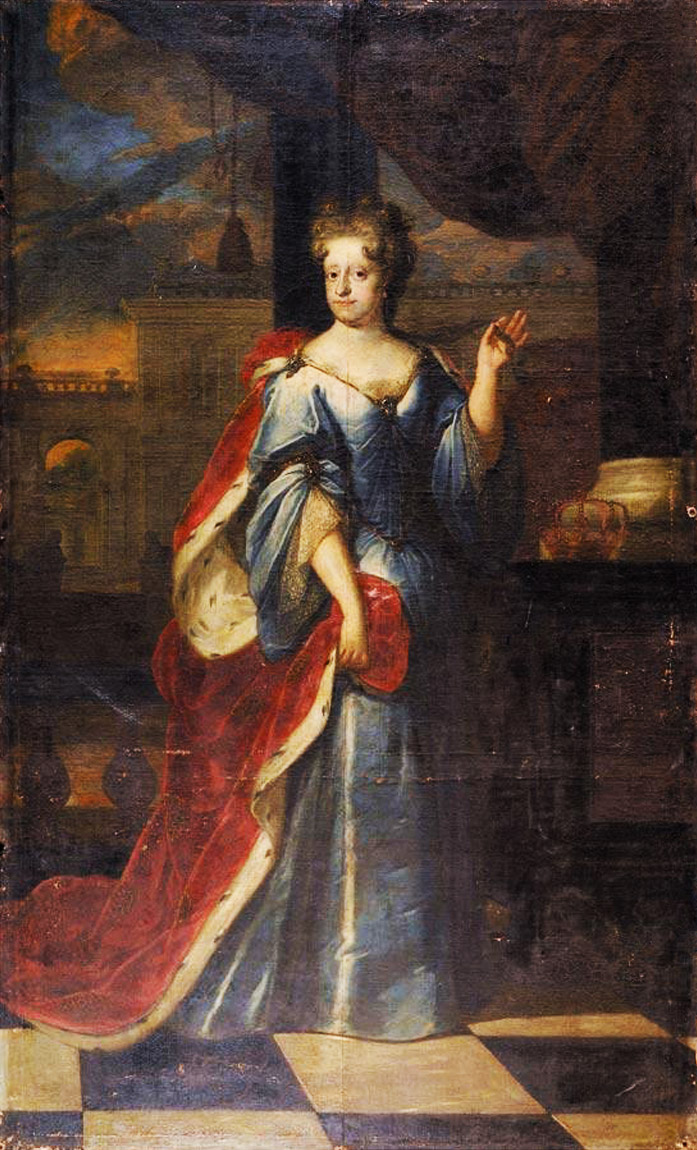
Portrait of Sophie Amalie as queen by an unidentified artist, c. 17th century

In 1648, Frederick and Sophie Amalie became king and queen of Denmark and Norway.

As her husband was introverted, she became the centre of a sumptuous court life, with exclusive luxury items and grand parties, which shed glory on the royal power. Queen Sophie Amalie made a pioneer cultural act in relation to the court parties by replacing the old medieval court entertainments with opera and ballet, which was thus introduced in Denmark by her at the court festivities. She enjoyed fashion, parties and theatre, arranged masquerades and made the French taste fashionable in Denmark. She remodeled the court after a French and German pattern. In 1649, a large order of items arrived for the new court life she arranged, followed also by new staff and new positions. She hired a German chapel master, Kaspar Förster, a French violin orchestra, a French ballet master, D. de Pilloy, and a French court singer and dancer, Anne Chabanceau de La Barre, and a French theatre company was engaged to perform French theater. Sophie Amalie did not understand the Danish language, but spoke German and French, took lessons in singing and dancing by instructors from France and Italy, was dressed by French maids in French fashion, conversed with her children in French and had a French chaplain, and as the first queen of Denmark took a French motto: „En Dieu mon espérance". Ballet, masquerades and theatre performances were performed, and she and her children participated in ballets and amateur theatre with the nobility; in 1655, she performed five different parts in a ballet at the same occasion. She was interested in literature and composed a library of French, German and Italian writers. She was noted to have great disputes with her Catholic brother John Frederick, in which her husband was called to participate in the debate.

Sophie Amalie was described as a charming beauty with entertaining wit and artistic taste, also in private correspondence not intended for her to see. A Swedish guest described her as "a lovely young person" and a Frenchman described her in 1649: "This princess was tall, blonde, with a very attractive complexion, mild and very accommodating toward strangers; she had a great taste for France, and she had everything it could give her." Sophia of Hanover was impressed by her and said of her that "her goodness and great accomplishments won over all hearts to her", while the French envoy noted that the queen's considerable charm was in fact reserved for those "which belongs to her party or are of use to her interests." The Spanish envoy Bernardino de Rebolledo dedicated sonnets to her in which he described her as a seraph.

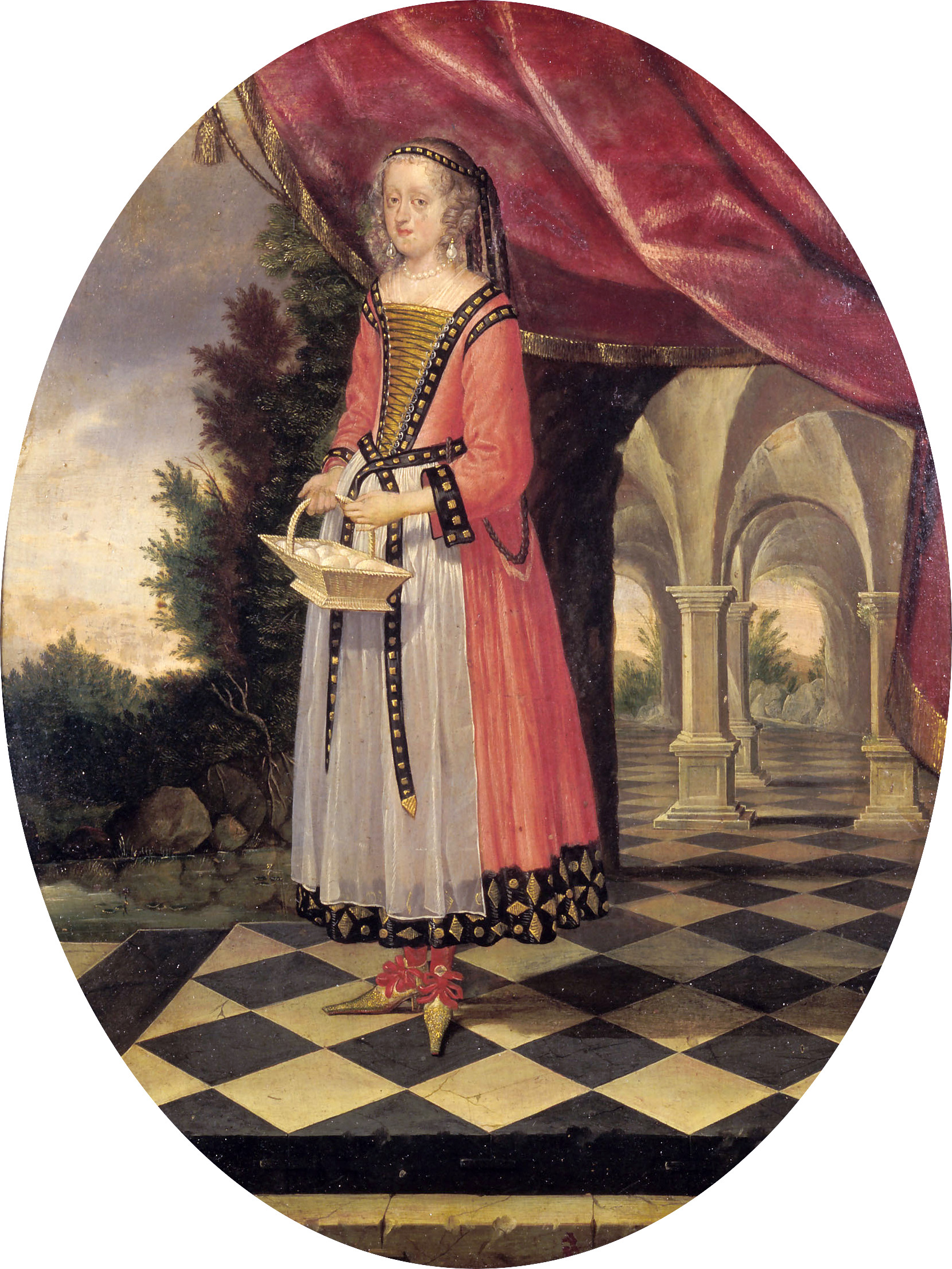
Sophie Amalie dressed in theatrical garb, as part of the theatre of court by Heimbach

Sophie Amalie was described as playful and enjoyed to disguise herself. When the abdicated queen Christina of Sweden was travelling through Denmark toward Germany incognito after her abdication, queen Sophie Amalie, who was at that time staying in Kolding, disguised herself as a maid and traveled to the inn at Haderslev to observe Christina while dining with her retinue, and then left without having introduced herself; on another occasion, she made a similar anonymous visit to Hamburg and back disguised as a maid, despite the fact that Denmark was at that time at war with Hamburg. She enjoyed hunting, particularly at her Jagdschloss of Hørsholm, would hunt in any weather, once killed thirty deer in one day, and was for her success as a huntress compared to the goddess Diana.

Queen Sophie Amalie is known as the hostess and central figure of the many grand representational parties that dominated Danish court life during her husband's reign. The Spanish envoy Rebolledo described her in this role at a party which was hosted in the honor of the queen's brother John Frederick at Jægersborg in 1655. After a deer hunt, where the royal couple participated similarly dressed in red and where "the queen conquered her skill to satisfy her generosity" by, as a good hostess, allowing the guests to win over her, a ball followed in which "the queen danced all night with such a smiling distance and such a majestic dignity, that she attracted the attention and appreciation of all". She participated in the amateur theater and ballet at court and, in one famous occasion, performed five roles in the same ballet: as Fama, a maid, the Muse of war - "in which she danced while waving a banner to the music with such superior rhythm, that she seemed to exceed herself" - a Spanish lady and an Amazon; a performance during which the king asked the Spanish envoy Rebolledo of his opinion and was given the reply "happy is a nation with such a king, and happy is the king with such a queen."

The grand court parties were a part of a representation of royal power deemed necessary to enhance the status of the crown and attract followers among the nobility in the royal couple's goal to strengthen royal power, particularly among the German nobility, which were inducted into the Danish nobility by the protection of the queen despite Danish opposition. The parties were however criticized by the royal council as provocative during the depression of the 1650s, when Denmark suffered from bad finances, and it was pointed out that the king, in order to please the queen, had spent April 1654 to June 1655 in Flensborg Castle, where party followed party "in an unbroken chain".

Sophie Amalie is credited with a great cultural impact in Denmark, breaking with the old Lutheran religious atmosphere and introducing a new court life influenced by a more general secular European art and pleasure culture, which as a role model also came to effect culture in the rest of Danish society.

=== Political influence ===
Queen Sophie Amalie was described as ambitious and was well known to participate in state affairs, with the blessing of her husband, and influence policy as his adviser. Her great influence upon her husband was widely known already before he became king: before Frederick had succeeded to the throne, a satire circulated in which this was caricatured in the form of a mock question: "Can a husband make any decisions whatever without the consent of his wife? Signed Duke Frederick." Her influence is contributed to the fact that she attracted her husband as well as was in possession of a willpower and energy exceeding his, as well as to the fact that they had the same political goals: "With her vivacious nature she understood how to attract her husband, with her greater decisiveness and more fiery temperament she energized his more careful nature to action, and above all she was given power, because she wanted it with all her flaming soul."

The three main political goals of Sophia Amalie and Frederick III were to defeat the power of the nobility, symbolized by the Svogerpartiet (Son-in-law's Party); to defeat the Swedes; and to expand royal power into absolutism, to which the queen gathered followers through her court festivities and by creating a net of contacts by handing out favors.

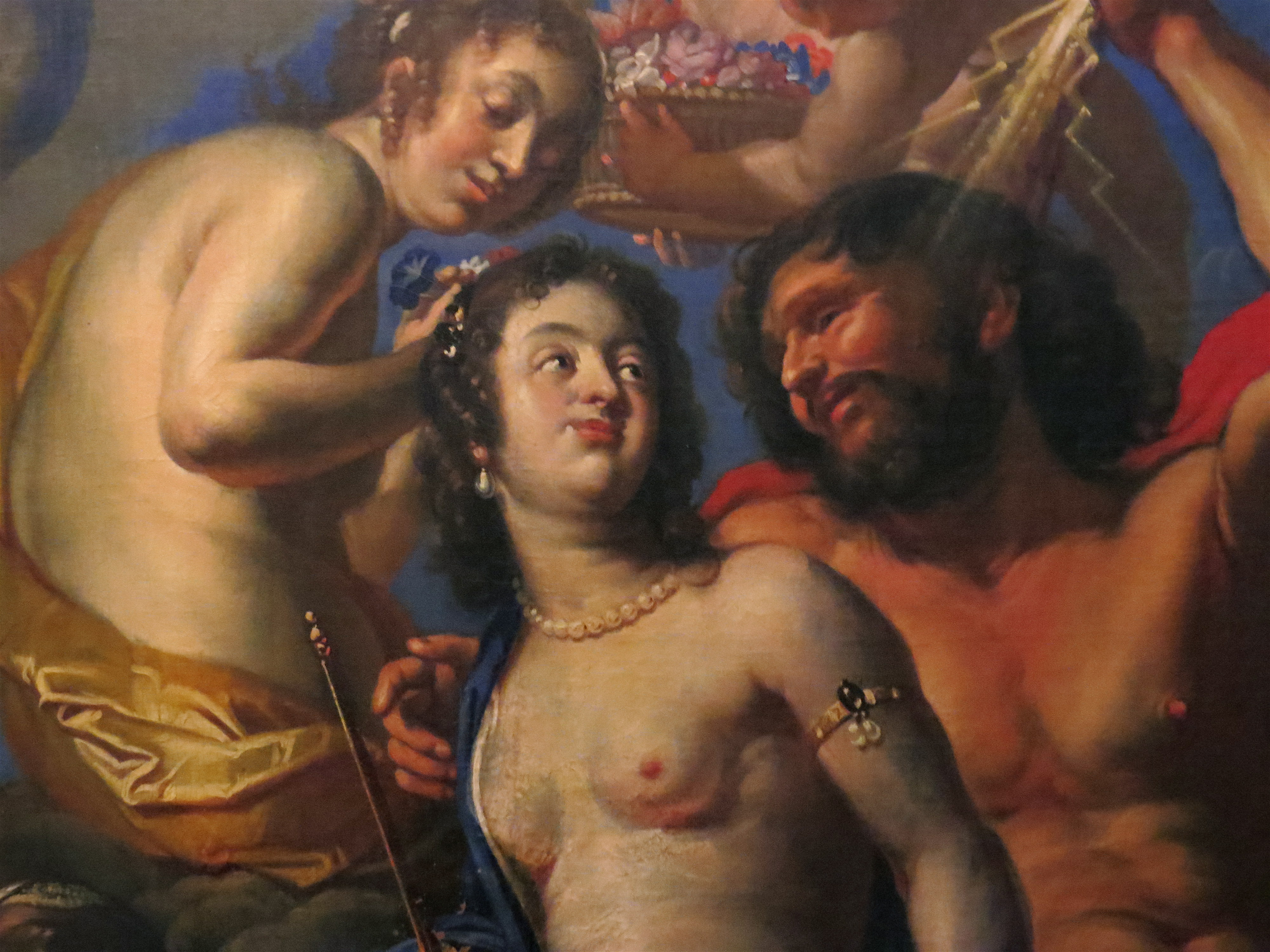
Sophie Amalie as the goddess Hera.

Queen Sophie Amalie was from the start of her husband's reign famously involved in the power struggle between the crown and the high nobility, symbolized by the so-called Svogerpartiet ('Son's-in-law Party'), composed by six noblemen married to daughters of her father-in-law from his second morganatic marriage with Kirsten Munk, among which Corfitz Ulfeldt, married to Leonora Christina Ulfeldt, was the leading member. Upon her husband's accession she became the first queen in over 30 years, and she could never stand the half-sisters of her spouse, who had fulfilled the position of first lady during their father's reign. This conflict had begun already during the celebration dinner of the king's accession to the throne in Copenhagen Castle 6 July 1648 with an incident Sophie Amalie and Leonora Christine: the queen being unusually quiet, Leonora Christine criticized her for her silence, after which the queen participated in conversation, but notably fell silent every time Leonora Christine joined in. By 1651, the Svogerpartiet, was crushed, its members disperse, the Ulfeldt couple left for Sweden and their property was confiscated.

Sophie Amalie is thought to have initiated the war against Sweden in 1657. After the peace with Sweden in 1658, she presided over the celebration of the Peace of Roskilde when the Swedish king Charles X Gustav was received at Frederiksborg Palace, during which she entertained with avec beaucoup d'éclat and conversed about the crossing of the Bält by the Swedish army. When the Swedish king pointed at Erik Dahlberg and stated that he had been the commander, Frederick III greeted Dahlberg by allowing him to kiss his hand, while the queen for a moment, according to Dahlberg, had an expression which stated her feelings toward him as "not all which was good". The act for which queen Sophie Amalie is most famous was her behavior during the Siege of Copenhagen in 1658, during which "Sophie Amalie was given the opportunity to show all the strength and decisiveness of her nature, now unleashed for a more noble purpose than a hunt or the most exiting adventure trip". She is believed to have exerted great influence upon the king, normally often passive and uncertain, in their mutual steadfastness never to surrender, and their act reportedly strengthened civilian morale considerably and earned them widespread popularity. During the Siege, the king showed himself on horse in the weak spots of the city both in night and day, accompanied by the queen, also on horseback, to strengthen public morale. The position of the queen was illustrated by the fact that military commands were known to give their messages to her when they could not find the king, and at one such incident, it was mentioned that she was positioned in the highest tower of Copenhagen Castle, looking toward the Swedish troops. During the war with Sweden in 1658, she sent her own agent Lorents Tuxen to commit sabotage behind the Swedish lines.

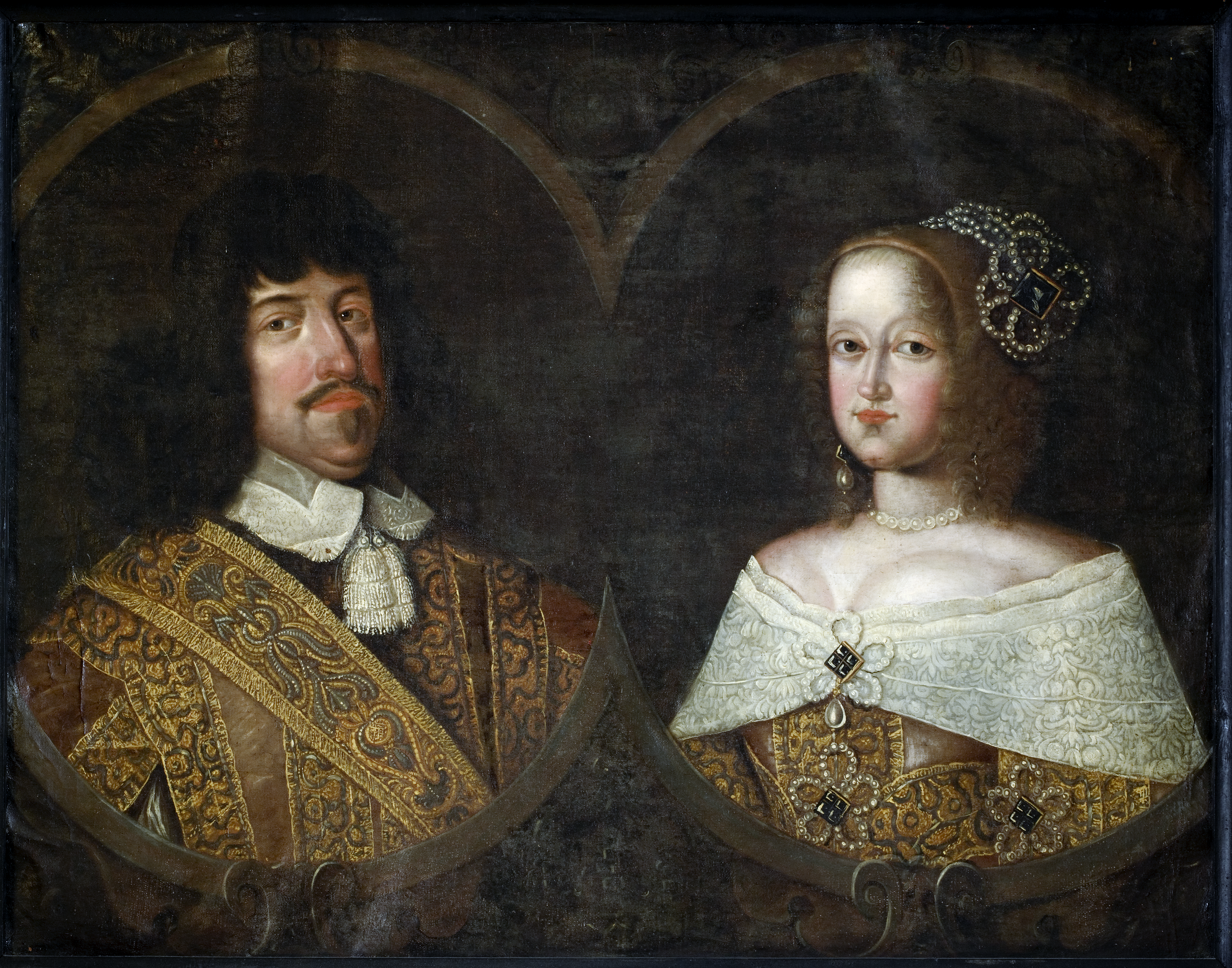
Frederik III and Sophie Amalie

Sophie Amalie probably took part in the decision to introduce the absolute monarchy by the 1660 state of emergency in Denmark. This happened while the popularity of the royal couple was at its highest after the Swedish siege of Copenhagen in 1658–60. She was very popular at that point for her moral support during the siege. During the Assembly of the Estates and the 1660 state of emergency in Denmark, which eventually resulted in the introduction of absolute monarchy in Denmark, the queen was likely one of the most important participants as the adviser of the king, but it is difficult to determine her concrete actions. It was reportedly Sophie Amalie, who on 10 October 1660 convinced Frederick III to go through with the plans to introduce absolutism by force in a difficult moment when the estates had refused to agree to introduce it. The queen was however not involved in the creation of the Kongeloven (Lex Regia), the “constitution” of Danish absolute monarchy, and Christoffer Gabel had difficulty to persuade the king to introduce it because the king feared that she would be displeased with the regulations concerning queen dowagers, and stalled introducing it by saying: "Let me be able to keep the peace with the queen."

After the introduction of the Kongeloven in 1665, the queen's position was undermined by Christoffer Gabel, who replaced her as the king's chief adviser. She was notably not included as regent in the event of her son succeeding to the throne while still a minor. The reason why her spouse no longer relied so much upon her advice in the latter part of his reign, was likely the instability in foreign policy caused by her indecisiveness as to whether her goals to reconquer the Southern Provinces from Sweden would benefit most from an alliance with France or with the Holy Roman Empire. Another cause was her favoritism of her younger son, and her ambition to secure marriages of the highest status possible for her daughters regardless of political benefit for Denmark; one example of such was arranging for Ulrika Eleonora to marry Charles XI and become Queen of Sweden despite the fact that Sweden was Denmark's enemy.

After the introduction of absolutism, the queen increasingly attracted attention for her protection of favorites and her persecution of those she disliked. It was said that "The queen is not always good toward those, who devote themselves to the king, without being dependent upon others"; that she wished to be "sought and honored", and by handing out favors she gathered followers to a queen's party who owed their loyalty to her personally, and who eventually also gained influence over her. One of her protegees was Jacob Petersen, officially only a chamber servant of the king, who was given much favor by the queen and described as her "most confidant tool" until he was suddenly exiled by the king in 1664 for the unspecific accusation of being involved in "many intrigues"; after the king's death, Sophie Amalie had all accusations against Petersen dropped. Her most favored lady-in-waiting was Abel Cathrine. Of the persecutions, the most known victims are Kai Lykke and Leonora Christine. In 1662, the nobleman Kai Lykke was forced to flee and had his property in Denmark confiscated after he was discovered to have written in a private letter to his mistress that the queen had sex with her lackeys; he was not allowed back to Denmark until after Sophie Amalie's death. In 1663, she famously had Leonora Christina Ulfeldt imprisoned in the Blåtårn, and refused to release her as long as she herself was still alive.

While her artistic taste was French, her political views were German-oriented and her influence was feared, especially among the nobility. A characteristic remark was made by nobleman Henrik Bjelke from the first Swedish war: "The king is good, but God save us with honor from here! The queen is not good by any Dane, and she has the king in her power." Also the foreign ambassadors noted the queen's influence over the king and government. Baron Ludvig Holberg said about her that she had "the capacity of a statesman" and "the heart of a soldier" but also that she was "more admired than loved" and that she went too far in her hatred toward Leonora Christina.

=== Queen Dowager ===
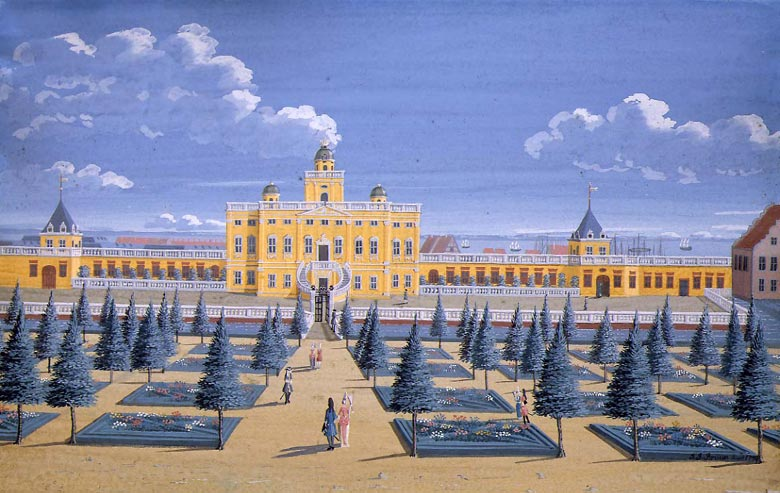
Sophie Amalienborg

In 1670, Frederick III died and was succeeded by her eldest son Christian V. Her son the king did what he could to curb her influence in state affairs, which was evidently not easy: in 1671, he wrote to Griffenfeld: "God be praised, the queen dowager has left for Hirsholm today, so I need no longer hear: 'What do I hear now?'"

Despite her son's dislike over her interference, she remained a factor which was taken into consideration in Danish politics, and Griffenfeld was careful to keep in her good graces. It is noted that Griffenfeld assisted her in her ambition to have her younger son Georg elected king of Poland. Griffenfeld and Sophie Amalie also worked in securing peace with Sweden during the Scanian War, as Sophie Amalie wished for peace with Sweden and its ally France because her favorite Catholic brother was Francophile and because she wished for her daughter Ulrika Eleonora to marry the Swedish king. The fall of Griffenfeld was, therefore, a great misfortune for Sophie Amalie and her political position, and it attracted great attention when the queen dowager demonstratively left the capital after the sudden arrest of Griffenfeld. His later pardon is credited with her influence. The Peace of 1680 was a great joy for her, as it resulted in the desired wedding between her daughter and the Swedish king. She accompanied Ulrika Eleonora to Kronborg, but it was noted how she could not make herself to show her daughter the ceremony due to her future rank as queen.

Her relationship to her daughter-in-law Charlotte Amalie was not a good one. Sophie Amalie was reportedly most unwilling to surrender her position as queen and her precedence as the first lady of the court to her daughter-in-law, and was only with great difficulty made to vacate the queen's apartment to her successor. Her daughter-in-law was however not willing to give up her rank, and the precedence conflict between the queen and the queen dowager was prolonged for years: reportedly, the queen dowager demanded that the foreign ambassadors call to be introduced to her first rather than the queen, otherwise, she would have them barred from her court, a situation which created such difficulty that the king sometimes solved the matter by leaving for another palace with his wife so that the queen and the queen dowager would not be present at the same time and thus the rank conflict avoided.

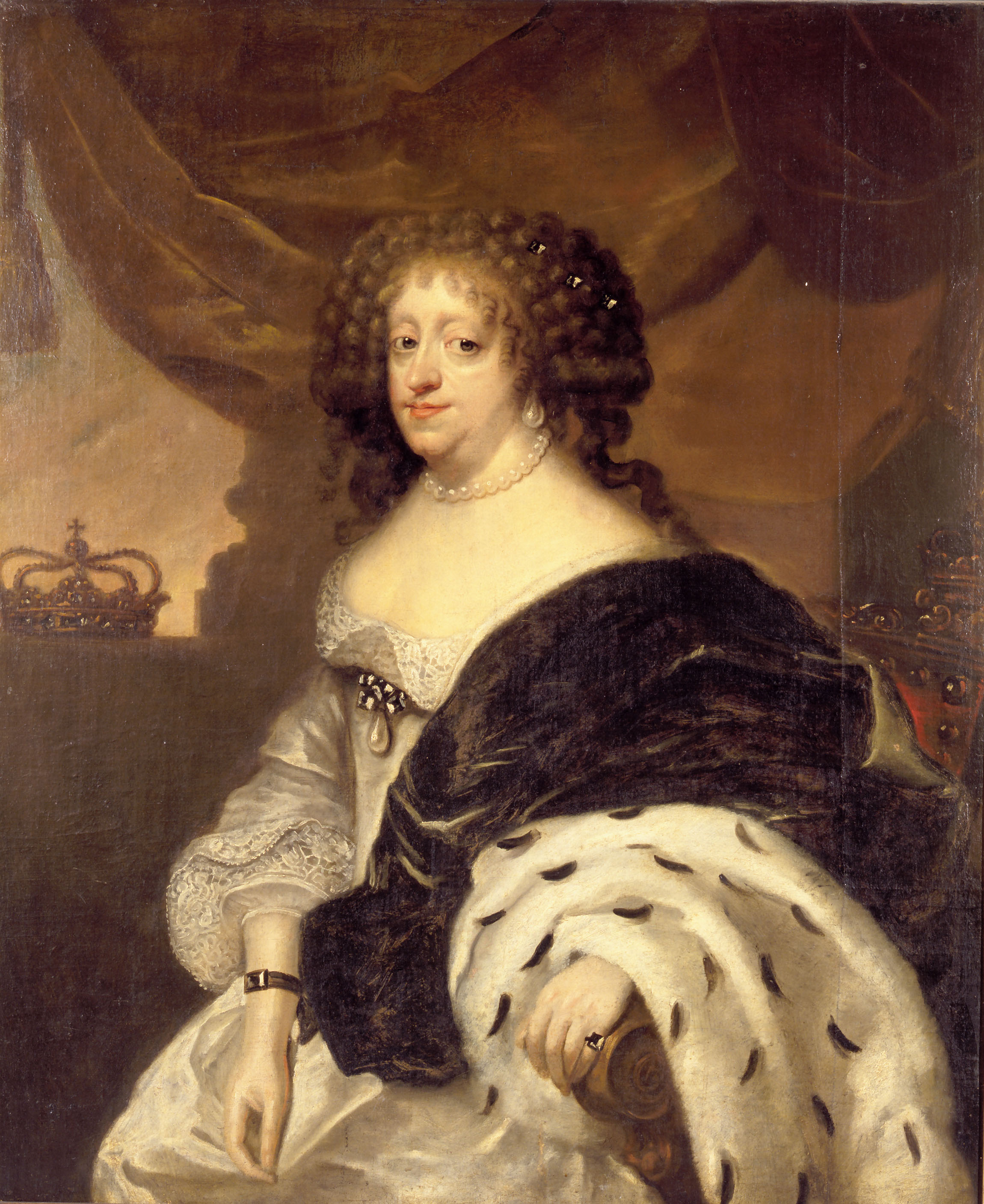
Portrait by Abraham Wuchters, 1675

Sophie Amalie is known to have assured the continuing imprisonment of Leonora Christine also as a widow. Upon the accession of Christian V, his wife Charlotte Amalie successfully asked him a promise to release Leonora Christine if the expected child was a son, and when she did give birth to a son in 1671, she called in the promise. When Sophie Amalie was informed, however, she managed to have the king retract his promise by refusing to attend the christening of the crown prince. When Leonora Christine's daughter Ellen Kristine petitioned her for her mother's release, Sophie Amalie successfully asked her son the king to banish Ellen Kristine from the nation.

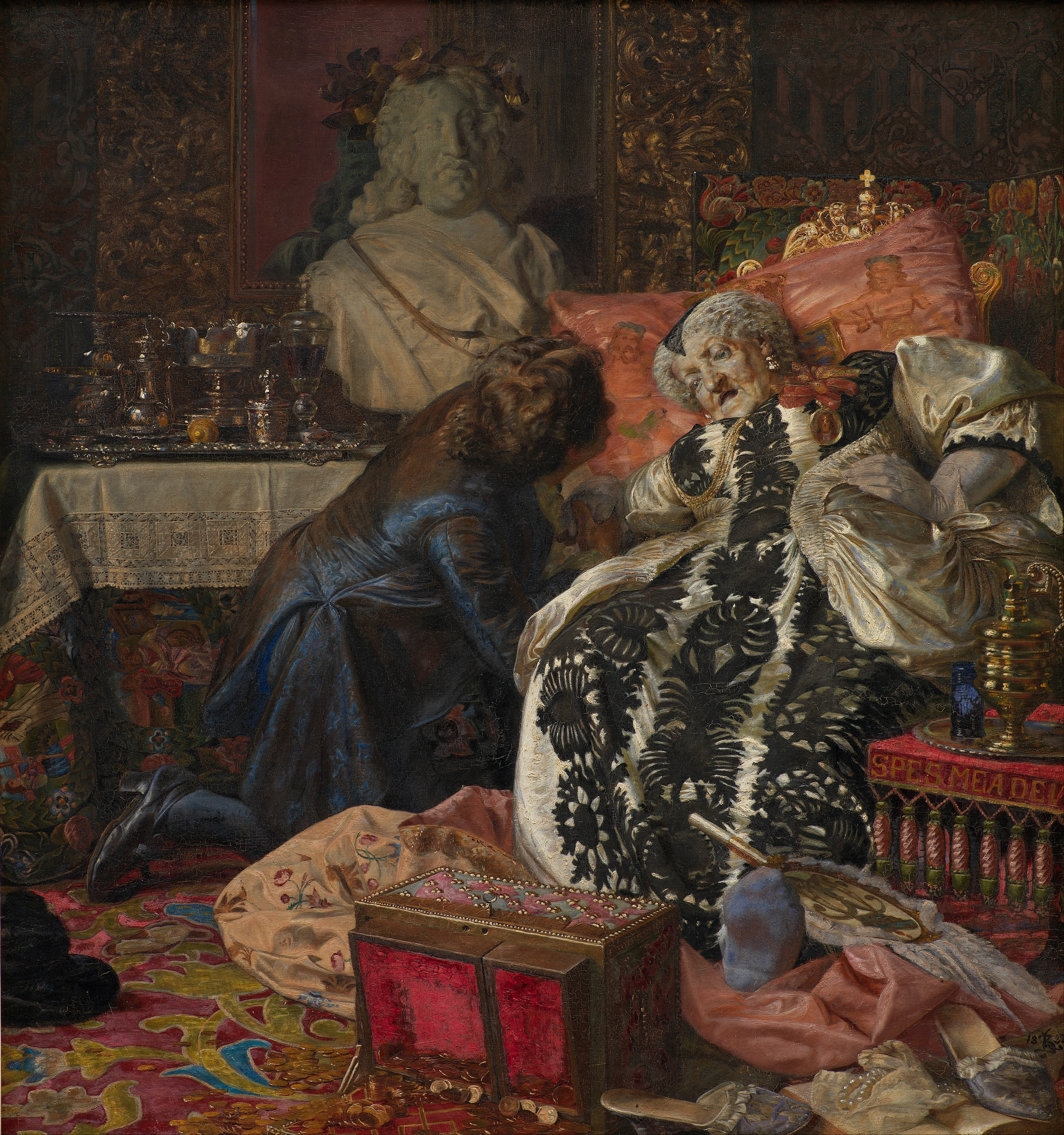
The Death of Queen Sophie Amalie by Kristian Zahrtmann, 1882

As queen dowager, Sophie Amalie continued to host a grand court life with many festivities, as she had done as queen. She lived in Sophie Amalienborg in Copenhagen in the winters and at Nykøbing Slot or Hørsholm during the summers. Sophie of Hanover visited her in 1680 and said of her: "If I should praise this queen as she deserved, I would never be finished." She still hosted hunting trips and balls and was described as an avid hunter, and attended masquerade balls at court in costume until her death. When the wedding of her daughter Ulrika Eleonora to the Swedish king was arranged, she welcomed the Swedish envoy Johan Gyllenstierna, who was a known misogynist, with a great banquet, and reportedly, when he entered her palace, there was "no man there, only women and the fairest you could imagine. As a wise man, he soon realized that it was deliberately, as he was unmarried, and the rumour had it, that he could abide no female."

She died in Copenhagen and was buried in the Roskilde Cathedral. After her death, Leonora Christina Ulfeldt was finally released, after twenty-two years of imprisonment.

== Issue ==
Name	Birth	Death	Notes
Christian	15 April 1646	25 August 1699	succeeded as King of Denmark and Norway married, 1667, Charlotte Amalie of Hesse-Cassel; had issue
Anna Sophia	1 September 1647	1 July 1717	married, 1666, John George III, Elector of Saxony; had issue
Frederika Amalia	11 April 1649	30 October 1704	married, 1667, Christian Albert, Duke of Holstein-Gottorp; had issue
Wilhelmina Ernestina	21 June 1650	22 April 1706	married, 1671, Charles II, Elector Palatine; no issue
Frederick	11 October 1651	14 March 1652	died in infancy
George	2 April 1653	28 October 1708	married, 1683, Anne, Queen of Great Britain; had issue
Ulrika Eleonora	11 September 1656	26 October 1693	married, 1680, Charles XI, King of Sweden; had issue
Dorothea	16 November 1657	15 May 1658	died in infancy

== Ancestry ==
Ancestors of Sophie Amalie of Brunswick-Calenberg

8. Ernest I, Duke of Brunswick-Lüneburg
4. William, Duke of Brunswick-Lüneburg
9. Sophia of Mecklenburg-Schwerin
2. George, Duke of Brunswick-Calenberg
10. Christian III of Denmark
5. Dorothea of Denmark
11. Dorothea of Saxe-Lauenburg
1. Sophie Amalie of Brunswick-Calenberg
12. George I, Landgrave of Hesse-Darmstadt
6. Louis V, Landgrave of Hesse-Darmstadt
13. Magdalene of Lippe
3. Anne Eleonore of Hesse-Darmstadt
14. John George, Elector of Brandenburg
7. Magdalene of Brandenburg
15. Elisabeth of Anhalt-Zerbst

Sophie Amalie of Brunswick-Calenberg House of Hanover Cadet branch of the House of Welf Born: 24 March 1628 Died: 20 February 1685
Royal titles
Preceded by Anne Catherine of Brandenburg	Queen consort of Denmark and Norway; 1648–1670	Succeeded by Charlotte Amalie of Hesse-Kassel
