= Marie Louise of Hesse-Kassel =

Princess of Orange (1688–1765)

Princess consort of Orange
- Tenure: 1709–1711

Regent of the Netherlands
- 1st Regency: 1711–1730
- Monarch: William IV
- 2nd Regency: 1759–1765
- Monarch: William V
- Co-Regent: Duke Louis Ernest (1759–1765)
- Born: 7 February 1688; Kassel
- Died: 9 April 1765 (aged 77); Leeuwarden, Netherlands
- Burial: Grote or Jacobijnerkerk in Leeuwarden
- Spouse: John William Friso, Prince of Orange (m. 1709; died 1711)
- Issue: Amalia, Hereditary Princess of Baden-Durlach; William IV, Prince of Orange
Names
- German: Marie Luise; Dutch: Maria Louise
- House: Hesse-Kassel
- Father: Charles I, Landgrave of Hesse-Kassel
- Mother: Princess Maria Amalia of Courland

Marie Louise of Hesse-Kassel (7 February 1688 – 9 April 1765) was a Dutch regent, Princess of Orange by marriage to John William Friso, Prince of Orange, and regent of the Netherlands during the minority of her son and her grandson. She was a daughter of Charles I, Landgrave of Hesse-Kassel, and Maria Amalia of Courland.

From the end of World War II in 1945 until 2022, Marie Louise and her husband were the most recent common ancestors of all reigning hereditary monarchs in Europe.

Marie Louise is notable for having served as regent for two periods in Dutch history: during the reigns of her young son, William IV, Prince of Orange from 1711 and 1730, and of her young grandson, William V, Prince of Orange, from 1759 to 1765. She was often fondly referred to as Marijke Meu (Aunt Mary) by her Dutch subjects.

== Early life ==
Marie Louise was one of seventeen children of Charles I, Landgrave of Hesse-Kassel, and his wife and cousin, Princess Maria Amalia of Courland. Two of her siblings included King Frederick I of Sweden and William VIII, Landgrave of Hesse-Kassel.

== Princess of Orange ==
On 26 April 1709, Marie Louise was married to Johan William, Prince of Orange. He was the eldest surviving son of Henry Casimir II, Prince of Nassau-Dietz, and Henriëtte Amalia of Anhalt-Dessau; he had inherited his title in 1702 from the childless William III, Prince of Orange, due to his descent from both William the Silent and Frederick Henry, Prince of Orange.

The events behind their betrothal began after Johan William was almost killed by cannon fire and roundshot on two occasions. His mother, Henriette Amalia, perhaps realizing how vulnerable her son was, quickly began looking for a suitable bride to ensure an heir. In the end, the choice came down to two German princesses. She apparently informed him that he should think of the choice as between two chairs, and that he should choose the most comfortable of the two. Johan duly traveled to Hesse-Kassel and became engaged to the 20-year-old Marie Louise within a week. He did not even bother meeting the other candidate. The main factor in this decision was probably that Marie Louise's father was a trusted general under the well-respected Duke of Marlborough. In addition, marriage to a daughter of the Landgrave of Hesse-Kassel would also have served to strengthen Johan William's place among the other ruling houses.

Marie Louise was not considered attractive, as her features were heavy and her face was dominated by a large nose. She was however very charming, and greeted those of all ranks with natural friendliness and sincere concern for their well being. They had two children before his untimely death by drowning on 14 July 1711, the youngest of whom was born after his death. William Charles Henry Friso's birth was met with great relief by the Frisians, and he automatically inherited the title Prince of Orange.

== First regency ==
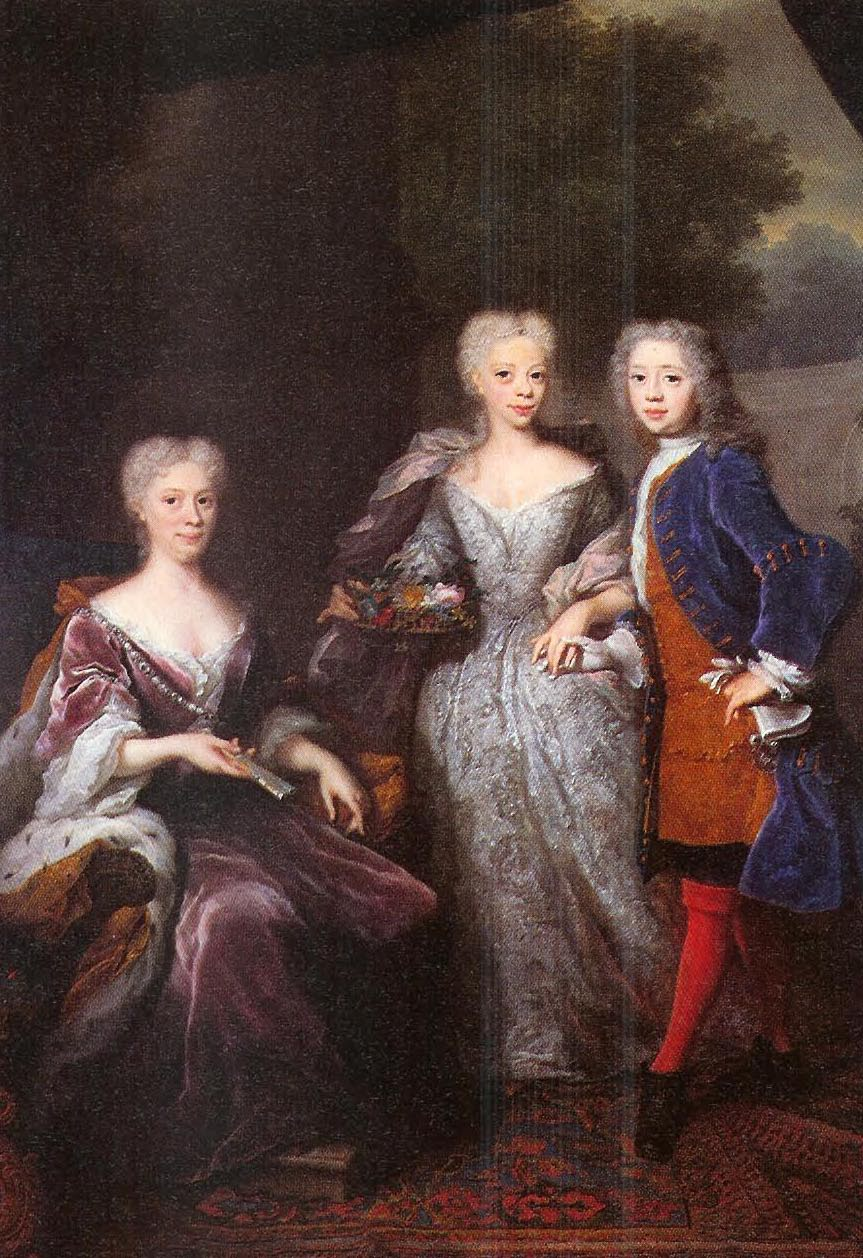
Marie Louise (left) with her two children, c. 1725

Since her husband died while she was pregnant, her son William immediately became Prince of Orange upon his birth six weeks later. Marie Louise served as regent for her son from 1711 until he reached his majority in 1731. This regency was granted despite her inexperience with the affairs of her adopted country.

Although she did not have any experience, Marie Louise successfully withstood a series of natural disasters, which included a sequence of bad harvests and severe winters from 1712 to 1716. At the time of her marriage, Marie Louise quickly earned the affection of the Dutch population. She was known as a woman of intelligence and sensitivity, and was often fondly referred to as Marijke Meu. She also dealt with a major problem concerning shipworms – parasites that upon arriving on ships from the Far East, proceeded to devour wooden sections of the vital, protective dykes. These damages threatened to collapse the entire dyke system, which would have destroyed vast amounts of land used for farming in the Dutch province of Friesland. The money needed to prevent such an occurrence from happening was hard to raise however; tax obligations to the Hague from this province were seldom realistically reviewed. In order to end the looming starvation, Marie Louise traveled to the Hague and pleaded in person before the States-General for help. She apparently spoke so eloquently that she returned home with not only a remittance on taxation, but also with a sizable detachment of soldiers to help repair the dykes.

After a 1736 visit, Marie Louise maintained a correspondence, in "abominable French," with religious and social reformer Count Nikolaus Ludwig of Zinzendorf and Pottendorf. A deeply religious woman, she provided sanctuary to persecuted Protestants fleeing the Catholic Habsburgs. Despite her son's objections, Marie Louise allowed a group of Moravians to settle in the barony of IJsselstein, of which she was baroness.

== Traits and relationships with children ==
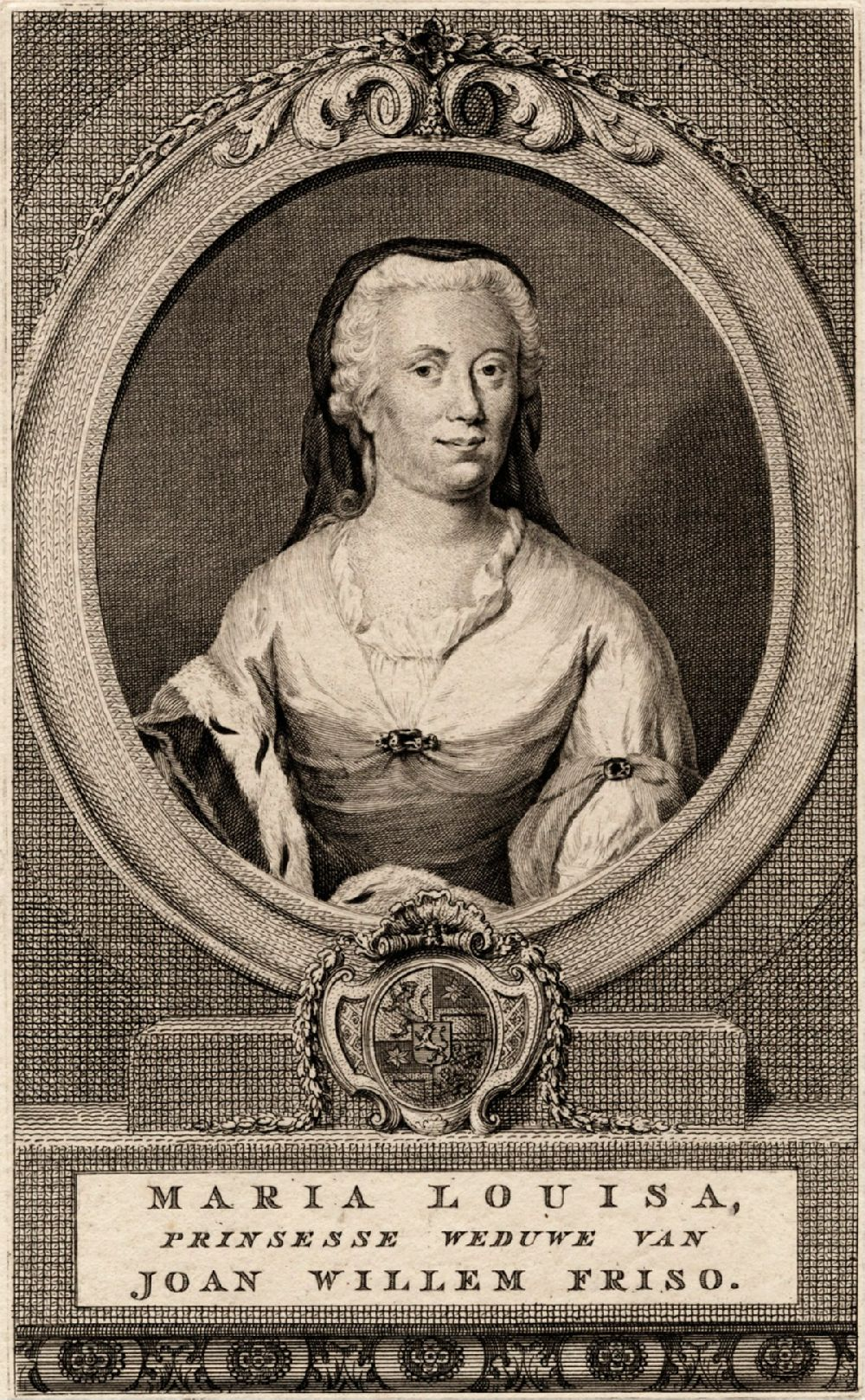
Anonymous Netherlands, Portrait of Maria Louisa, Princess of Orange, mid 1700s, engraving

After her husband died, Marie Louise found herself a 23-year-old widow residing in a foreign country. She became inherently pessimistic and agonized over the affairs of her children. This pessimistic trait passed onto her daughter Amalia as well, causing her to be melancholy and withdrawn her whole life. Her son William inherited her heavy Germanic looks, rather than "the finely etched ascetic looks which his father had shared with William III". William was sickly as a child, and was rigidly disciplined and educated by Marie Louise with great care in the city of Leeuwarden.

Marie Louise had a good relationship with her son, so that by the time of his coming of age in 1729, she was invited to take equal part in the celebrations. In his youth, she sent him daily letters reminding him to do such things as brush his teeth and get plenty of sleep; he duly responded to each letter patiently.

Marie Louise was described to be frugal, especially in comparison to the excesses of her mother-in-law Henriette Amalia. Due to this frugality, she was able to give large sums to various charitable causes. On one occasion, a nobleman offered her lavish hospitality; she replied by asking if he did not feel guilty at using money he could have donated to the poor.

=== Marriage of William IV, Prince of Orange ===
Marie Louise's son William married Anne, Princess Royal, eldest daughter of George II of Great Britain, on 25 March 1734 at St James's Palace in London. Upon return of the wedding party to the Netherlands, William had written his mother, warning her that Anne was allowed precedence over Marie Louise because she was his wife and a king's daughter. This warning was hardly needed, as Marie Louise had eagerly exited Prinsenhof as soon as her son came of age, opting to live in an elegant but unpretentious house in Harlingen. She had long displayed her disinterest in royal technicalities and the royal lifestyle. She welcomed her son and his new wife upon their arrival, but then returned to her quiet house, taking no part in their ceremonious entry.

== Second regency ==
From 1759 until her death in 1765, Marie Louise also served as regent for her young grandson William V, Prince of Orange, after the previous regent (his mother and Marie Louise's daughter-in-law, Anne) died. Marie Louise was succeeded as regent by Duke Louis Ernest of Brunswick-Lüneburg and her granddaughter Princess Caroline of Nassau-Weilburg.

== Death ==
Marie Louise died on 9 April 1765 in Leeuwarden, the capital city of the Dutch province of Friesland. She outlived her son William by 14 years.

== Ancestry ==
Ancestors of Marie Louise of Hesse-Kassel

8. William V, Landgrave of Hesse-Kassel
4. William VI, Landgrave of Hesse-Kassel
9. Amalie Elisabeth of Hanau-Münzenberg
2. Charles I, Landgrave of Hesse-Kassel
10. George William, Elector of Brandenburg
5. Hedwig Sophie of Brandenburg
11. Elizabeth Charlotte of the Palatinate
1. Marie Louise of Hesse-Kassel
12. Wilhelm Kettler, Duke of Courland
6. Jacob Kettler, Duke of Courland
13. Duchess Sophie of Prussia
3. Maria Amalia of Courland
14. George William, Elector of Brandenburg (= 10)
7. Louise Charlotte of Brandenburg
15. Elizabeth Charlotte of the Palatinate (= 11)

== Issue ==
Name	Birth	Death	Notes
Princess Anna Charlotte Amalia	1710	1777	married Frederick, Hereditary Prince of Baden-Durlach; had issue, including Charles Frederick, Grand Duke of Baden
William IV, Prince of Orange	1711	1751	married Anne, Princess Royal; had issue, including William V, Prince of Orange

=== Royal descendants ===
Royal descendants of John William Friso and Marie Louise of Hesse-Kassel. Currently reigning monarchs in bold.

John William Friso	Marie Louise of Hesse-Kassel
William IV, Prince of Orange	Princess Amalia of Nassau-Dietz
William V, Prince of Orange	Princess Carolina of Orange-Nassau	Charles Frederick, Grand Duke of Baden
William I of the Netherlands	Frederick William, Prince of Nassau-Weilburg	Princess Henriette of Nassau-Weilburg	Charles Louis, Hereditary Prince of Baden
William II of the Netherlands	Prince Frederick of the Netherlands	William, Duke of Nassau	Princess Henrietta of Nassau-Weilburg	Duchess Amelia of Württemberg	Duke Alexander of Württemberg	Charles, Grand Duke of Baden	Caroline of Baden
Louise of the Netherlands	Sophia of Nassau	Princess Helena of Nassau	Adolphe, Grand Duke of Luxembourg	Archduke Karl Ferdinand of Austria	Princess Alexandra of Saxe-Altenburg	Francis, Duke of Teck	Princess Josephine of Baden	Princess Marie Amelie of Baden	Princess Sophie of Bavaria
William III of the Netherlands	Emma of Waldeck and Pyrmont	Louise of Sweden	Gustaf V of Sweden	Princess Helen of Waldeck and Pyrmont	William IV of Luxembourg	Maria Christina of Austria	Olga Constantinovna of Russia	Mary of Teck	Princess Marie of Hohenzollern-Sigmaringen	Mary Victoria Douglas-Hamilton	Archduke Karl Ludwig of Austria
Wilhelmina of the Netherlands	Christian X of Denmark	Haakon VII of Norway	Princess Ingeborg of Denmark	Prince Carl, Duke of Västergötland	Gustaf VI Adolf of Sweden	Charles Edward, Duke of Saxe-Coburg and Gotha	Charlotte, Grand Duchess of Luxembourg	Alfonso XIII of Spain	Constantine I of Greece	Prince Andrew of Greece	George VI of the United Kingdom	Albert I of Belgium	Louis II of Monaco	Archduchess Elisabeth Amalie of Austria
Juliana of the Netherlands	Olav V of Norway	Princess Märtha of Sweden	Prince Gustaf Adolf, Duke of Västerbotten	Princess Sibylla of Saxe-Coburg and Gotha	Infante Juan, Count of Barcelona	Paul of Greece	Prince Philip, Duke of Edinburgh	Elizabeth II of the United Kingdom	Princess Charlotte, Duchess of Valentinois	Franz Joseph II, Prince of Liechtenstein
Beatrix of the Netherlands	Harald V of Norway	**Carl XVI Gustaf of Sweden**	Juan Carlos I of Spain	Princess Sophia of Greece	**Charles III of the United Kingdom**	Rainier III of Monaco	**Hans-Adam II of Liechtenstein**
**Willem-Alexander of the Netherlands**	**Haakon VIII of Norway**	**Felipe VI of Spain**
Astrid of Sweden	Leopold III of Belgium
Frederik IX of Denmark	Ingrid of Sweden	Jean, Grand Duke of Luxembourg	Princess Joséphine Charlotte of Belgium	Albert II of Belgium	**Albert II of Monaco**
Margrethe II of Denmark	Henri, Grand Duke of Luxembourg	**Philippe of Belgium**
**Frederik X of Denmark**	**Guillaume V of Luxembourg**

== See also ==
- List of regents
  - Emma of Waldeck and Pyrmont – Served as regent for Wilhelmina, Queen of the Netherlands, from 1890 to 1898
- Countess Palatine Caroline of Zweibrücken – Most recent common ancestress of all reigning hereditary European monarchs since ascension of Charles III, King of the United Kingdom in 2022
- Louise of Hesse-Kassel – Common ancestress of many reigning hereditary European monarchs
  - Descendants of Christian IX of Denmark – Lists progeny of Louise of Hesse-Kassel

== Citations ==
Marie Louise of Hesse-Kassel House of Hesse-Kassel Cadet branch of the House of Hesse Born: 7 February 1688 Died: 9 April 1765
Royal titles
Vacant Title last held by Mary II of England	Princess consort of Orange; 1709–1711	Vacant Title next held by Princess Anne of Great Britain
