= Elisabeth Henriette of Hesse-Kassel =

German princess (1661–1683)

Elisabeth Henriëtte of Hesse-Kassel
- Electoral Princess of Brandenburg; Hereditary Princess of Prussia
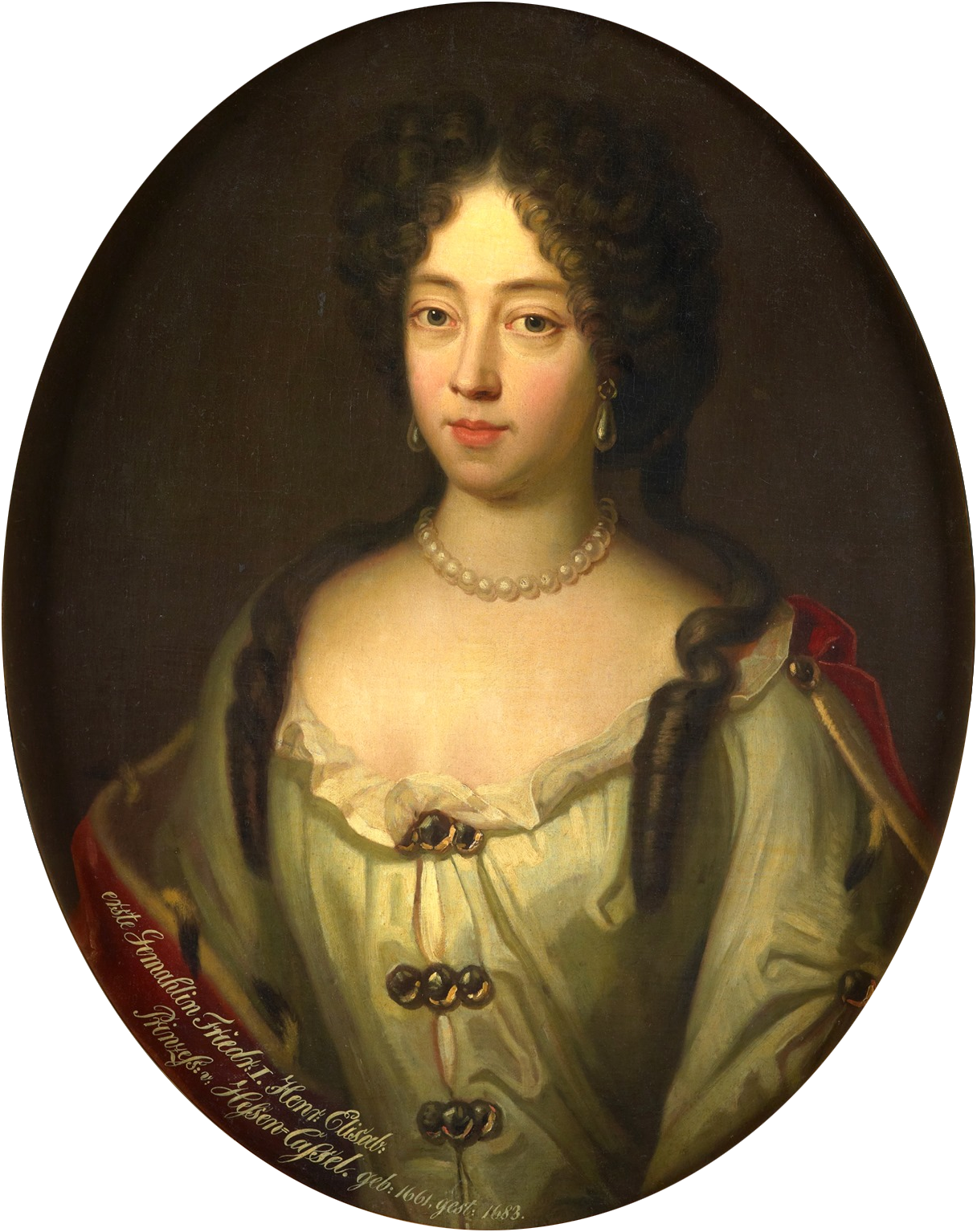
- Born: 18 November 1661; Kassel, Germany
- Died: 7 July 1683 (aged 21); Cölln, Germany
- Burial: Berlin Cathedral
- Spouse: Frederick, Electoral Prince of Brandenburg (m. 1679)
- Issue: Luise, Hereditary Princess of Hesse-Kassel
- House: Hesse-Kassel
- Father: William VI, Landgrave of Hesse-Kassel
- Mother: Hedwig Sophia of Brandenburg
- Religion: Calvinism

Landgravine Elisabeth Henriëtte von Hessen-Kassel (18 November 1661 – 7 July 1683) was the daughter of William VI, Landgrave of Hesse-Kassel and Hedwig Sophia of Brandenburg (1623–1683) and electoral princess of Brandenburg through her marriage to Frederick I of Prussia.

== Biography ==
Elisabeth Henriëtte was born in Kassel, Germany, on 18 November 1661 to William VI, Landgrave of Hesse-Kassel. She was the youngest of seven; siblings included Queen Charlotte Amalie, William VII, Luise, Charles I, Philip, and George. She suffered from an unknown illness in 1677 that her mother treated with the milk cure, wherein a teenage Elisabeth suckled from a wet nurse for three weeks and eventually recovered. Years later, on 13 August 1679, she married her cousin, Frederick, Prince Elector of Brandenburg, in Potsdam after his plan to marry a sister of Holy Roman Emperor Leopold I fell through. They held court in Köpenick Palace in a district of Berlin. On 29 September 1680, Luise Dorothea Sophie, the couple's only child, was born. Luise Dorothea later married Frederick I of Sweden, her first cousin, and became the electoral princess of Hesse-Kassel before dying in childbirth in 1705 at age 25

Elisabeth Henriëtte died on 7 July 1683 at age 21 from smallpox. Frederick accused his stepmother Dorothea of poisoning her but this was found to be untrue via investigation. She is buried at Berlin Cathedral with Frederick and his second wife Sophia Charlotte.

== Ancestry ==
Ancestors of Elisabeth Henriette of Hesse-Kassel

8. Maurice, Landgrave of Hesse-Kassel
4. William V, Landgrave of Hesse-Kassel
9. Countess Agnes of Solms-Laubach
2. William VI, Landgrave of Hesse-Kassel
10. Philip Louis II, Count of Hanau-Münzenberg
5. Countess Amalie Elisabeth of Hanau-Münzenberg
11. Countess Catharina Belgica of Nassau
1. Elisabeth Henriëtte of Hesse-Kassel
12. John Sigismund, Elector of Brandenburg
6. George William, Elector of Brandenburg
13. Duchess Anna of Prussia
3. Margravine Hedwig Sophie of Brandenburg
14. Frederick IV, Elector Palatine
7. Countess Palatine Elizabeth Charlotte of Simmern
15. Countess Louise Juliana of Nassau
