= Princess Luise Dorothea of Prussia =

Luise Dorothea of Prussia
- Hereditary Princess of Hesse-Kassel
- Born: 29 September 1680; Stadtschloss, Berlin
- Died: 23 December 1705 (aged 25); Kassel
- Spouse: Frederick, Hereditary Prince of Hesse-Kassel (m. 1700)
- House: Hohenzollern
- Father: Frederick I of Prussia
- Mother: Elisabeth Henriette of Hesse-Kassel

Princess Luise Dorothea Sophie of Prussia (29 September 1680 – 23 December 1705) was Hereditary Princess of Hesse-Kassel by marriage to Frederick, Hereditary Prince of Hesse-Kassel. She was the daughter of Frederick I, the first king in Prussia, and his first wife Elisabeth Henriette of Hesse-Kassel. She died in childbirth.

== Biography ==
On 31 May 1700, she married her first cousin Frederick, Hereditary Prince of Hesse-Kassel. Frederick was King of Sweden from 1720 to 1751 and Landgrave of Hesse-Kassel from 1730 to 1751.

Luise Dorothea was married in Berlin 31 May 1700 in a grand ceremony which took place during several weeks to great costs. Conrad Mel wrote Font Legatio orientalis at the occasion. During her five years of marriage, Luise Dorothea suffered from poor health. She died in childbirth.

Frederick remarried to Princess Ulrika Eleonora of Sweden, later becoming her prince consort and eventual King of Sweden.

== Ancestry ==
Ancestors of Princess Luise Dorothea of Prussia

8. George William, Elector of Brandenburg
4. Frederick William, Elector of Brandenburg
9. Elizabeth Charlotte of the Palatinate
2. Frederick I of Prussia
10. Frederick Henry, Prince of Orange
5. Countess Luise Henriette of Nassau
11. Amalia of Solms-Braunfels
1. Princess Luise Dorothea of Prussia
12. William V, Landgrave of Hesse-Kassel
6. William VI, Landgrave of Hesse-Kassel
13. Amalie Elisabeth of Hanau-Münzenberg
3. Elisabeth Henriette of Hesse-Kassel
14. George William, Elector of Brandenburg = 8
7. Hedwig Sophie of Brandenburg
15. Elizabeth Charlotte of the Palatinate = 9
