= William VIII, Landgrave of Hesse-Kassel =

William VIII
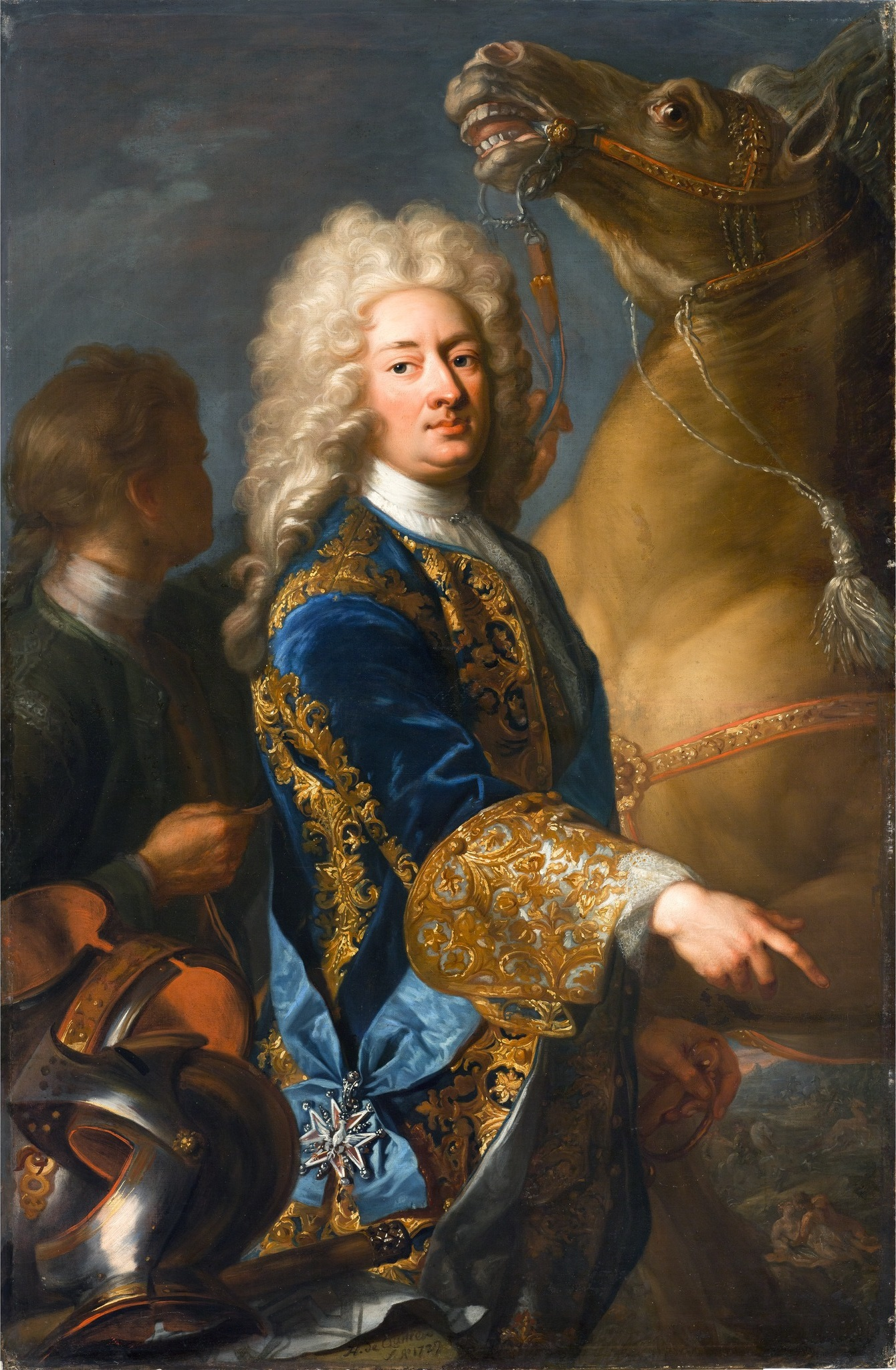
- Portrait of William VIII with the Order of the White Eagle (1729)

Landgrave of Hesse-Kassel
- Reign: 5 April 1751 – 1 February 1760
- Predecessor: Frederick I
- Successor: Frederick II
- Born: 10 March 1682; Kassel
- Died: 1 February 1760 (aged 77); Rinteln
- Burial: St Martin's Church, Kassel
- Spouse: Dorothea Wilhelmina of Saxe-Zeitz (m. 1717; died 1743)
- Issue: Charles; Frederick II, Landgrave of Hesse-Kassel; Maria Amalia
- House: Hesse
- Father: Charles I, Landgrave of Hesse-Kassel
- Mother: Maria Amalia of Courland
- Religion: Calvinism

William VIII (10 March 1682 – 1 February 1760) ruled the German Landgraviate Hesse-Kassel from 1730 until his death, first as regent (1730–1751) and then as landgrave (1751–1760).

== Life ==
Born in Kassel, he was the seventh son of Charles I, Landgrave of Hesse-Kassel and Maria Amalia of Courland. After his elder brother Frederick became King of Sweden in 1720 and his father died in 1730, he became de facto ruler of Hesse-Kassel. He officially became landgrave after his brother's death on 25 March 1751.

Five years later, the Seven Years' War began and William joined with the Prussian and British forces. Hesse-Kassel became an important battlefield and was occupied by France on several occasions. He had a deep, personal friendship with Frederick the Great, King of Prussia, and Holy Roman Emperor Charles VII.

His second son and successor, Frederick, became a Catholic, which led to restrictions on Catholicism in the Calvinist landgraviate and the transfer of the Principality of Hanau to his Protestant grandson William.

During his reign, William started building Schloss Wilhelmsthal in Calden and collected paintings, including works by Rembrandt.

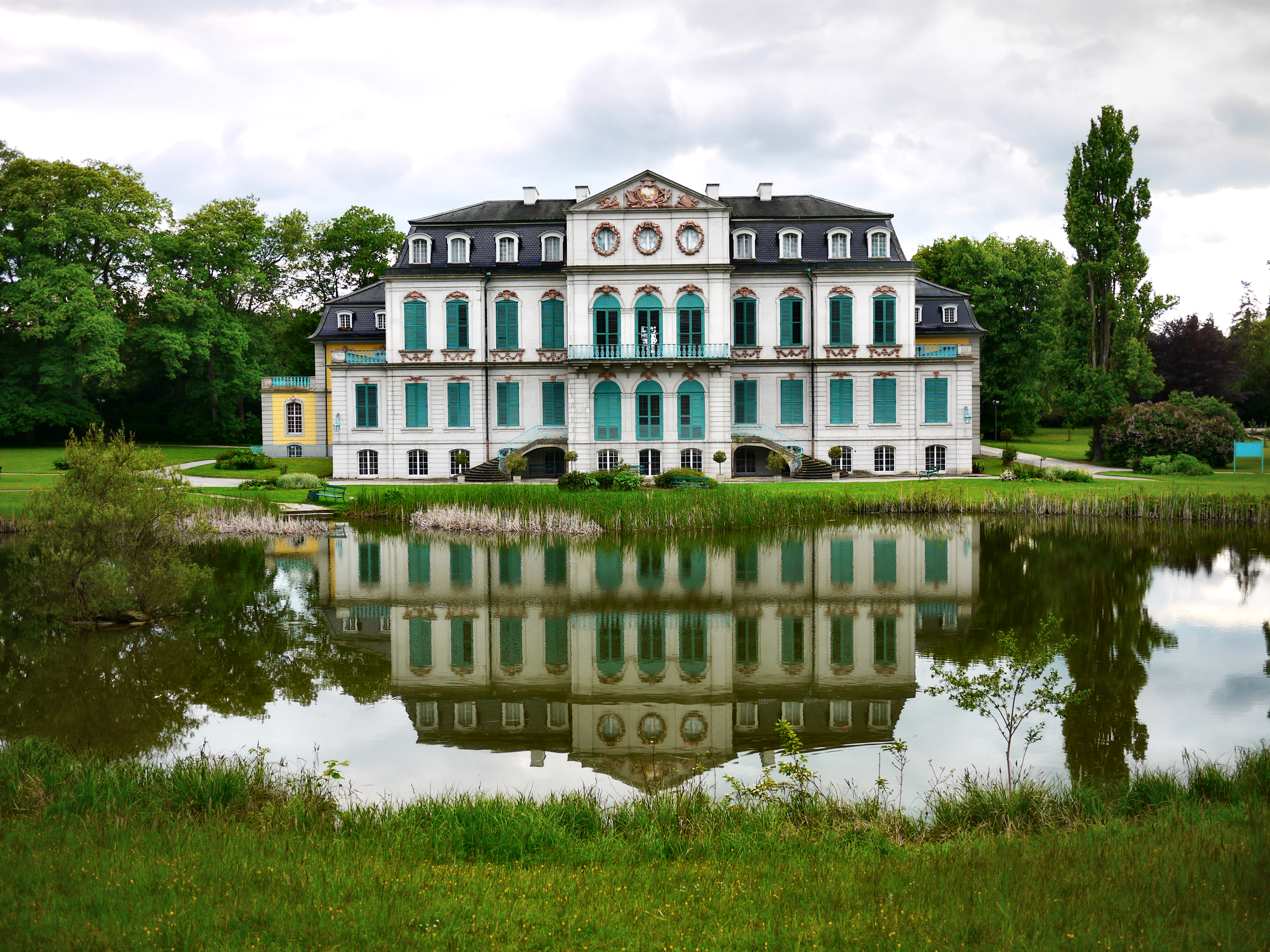
Schloss Wilhelmsthal

== Family ==
In 1717, William married Dorothea Wilhelmina, eldest daughter of Maurice William, Duke of Saxe-Zeitz.
They had three children:

- Charles (21 August 1718 – 17 October 1719);
- Frederick (1720 – 1785), his successor;
- Maria Amalia (7 July 1721 – 19 November 1744).

He died at Rinteln in 1760.

== Ancestry ==
Ancestors of William VIII, Landgrave of Hesse-Kassel

8. William V, Landgrave of Hesse-Kassel
4. William VI, Landgrave of Hesse-Kassel
9. Countess Amalie Elisabeth of Hanau-Münzenberg
2. Charles I, Landgrave of Hesse-Kassel
10. George William, Elector of Brandenburg
5. Margravine Hedwig Sophie of Brandenburg
11. Elizabeth Charlotte of the Palatinate
1. William VIII, Landgrave of Hesse-Kassel
12. Wilhelm Kettler, Duke of Courland
6. Jacob Kettler, Duke of Courland
13. Duchess Sophie of Prussia
3. Maria Amalia of Courland
14. George William, Elector of Brandenburg (= 10)
7. Margravine Louise Charlotte of Brandenburg
15. Elizabeth Charlotte of the Palatinate (= 11)

William VIII, Landgrave of Hesse-Kassel House of Hesse Born: 10 March 1682 Died: 1 February 1760
Regnal titles
Preceded by Frederick I	Landgrave of Hesse-Kassel; 1751–1760	Succeeded by Frederick II
