= George Charles of Hesse-Kassel =

Prince of Hesse-Kassel and Prussian general

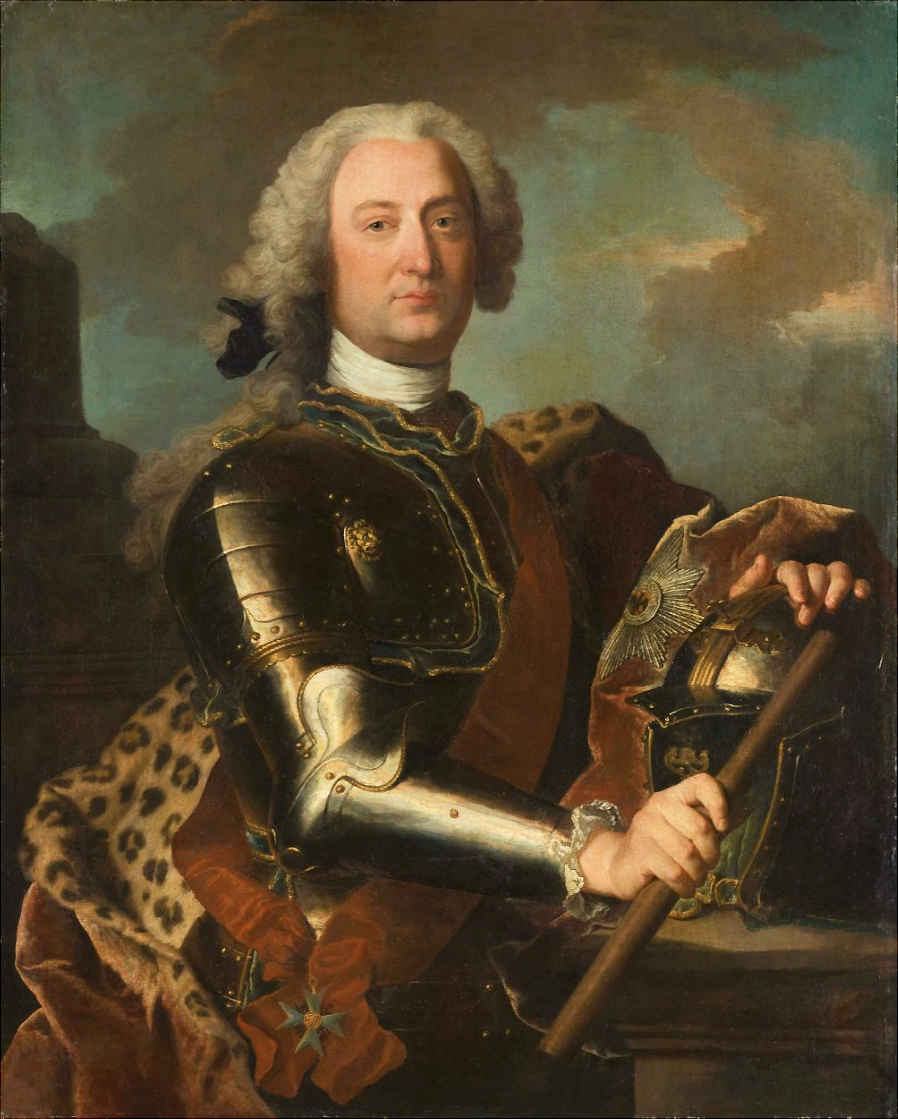
- Born: 8 January 1691; Kassel
- Died: 5 March 1755 (aged 64); Kassel
- House: House of Hesse
- Father: Charles, Landgrave of Hesse-Kassel
- Mother: Maria Amalia of Courland

George Charles of Hesse-Kassel (8 January 1691 – 5 March 1755) was a prince of Hesse-Kassel and a Prussian General.

== Life ==
George was the tenth and youngest son of the Landgrave Charles of Hesse-Kassel (1654-1730) from his marriage to Maria Amalia (1653-1711), the daughter of the Duke Jacob Kettler of Courland. His inheritance consisted of the fiefs Waltersbrück and Völkershausen.

He received his military training under King Frederick William I of Prussia. In 1723, he was promoted to lieutenant-general and appointed as governor of Minden. He left the Prussian army in 1730. He later served as field marshal lieutenant in the Swedish army, as general in the Hessian army and as lieutenant general in the Imperial army.

He was probably very close friends with his elder brother, King Frederick of Sweden and visited him in Stockholm several times.

George Charles died in 1755, unmarried and childless.
