= Frederick I of Sweden =

King of Sweden from 1720 to 1751

Frederick I
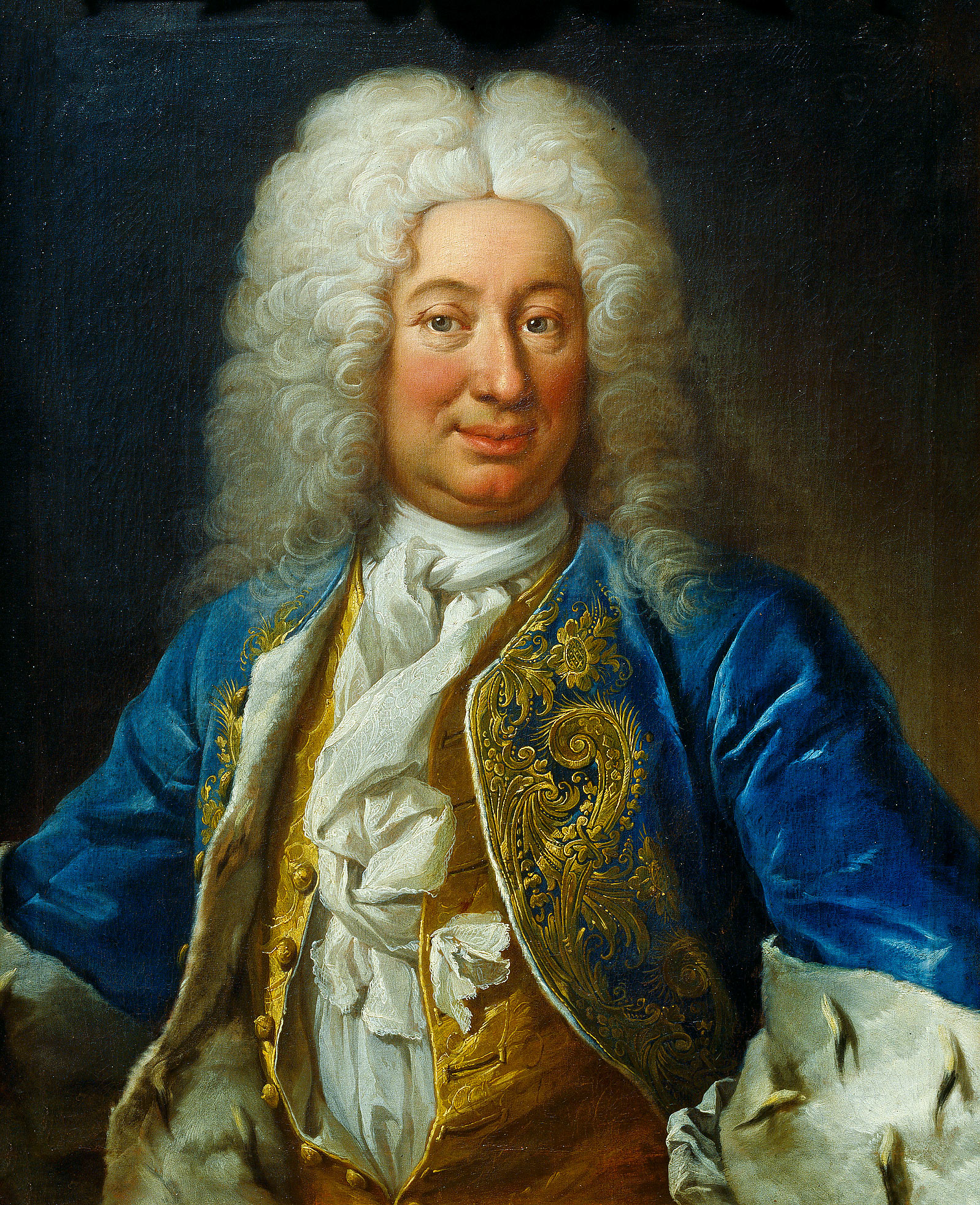

King of Sweden
- Reign: 24 March 1720 – 5 April 1751
- Coronation: 3 May 1720
- Predecessor: Ulrika Eleonora
- Successor: Adolf Frederick

Landgrave of Hesse-Kassel
- Reign: 23 March 1730 – 5 April 1751
- Predecessor: Charles I
- Successor: William VIII

Prince consort of Sweden
- Tenure: 5 December 1718 – 29 February 1720
- Born: 28 April 1676; Kassel, Hesse-Kassel
- Died: 5 April 1751 (aged 74); Stockholm, Sweden
- Burial: 27 September 1751; Riddarholmen Church
- Spouses: Luise Dorothea of Prussia (m. 1700; died 1705) Ulrika Eleonora, Queen of Sweden (m. 1715; died 1741)
- Issue more...: Frederick William von Hessenstein
- House: Hesse-Kassel
- Father: Charles I, Landgrave of Hesse-Kassel
- Mother: Maria Amalia of Courland
- Religion: Protestant

Frederick I (Swedish: Fredrik I; German: Friedrich I; 28 April 1676 – 5 April 1751) was King of Sweden from 1720 until his death, having been prince consort of Sweden from 1718 to 1720, and was also Landgrave of Hesse-Kassel from 1730. He ascended the throne following the death of his brother-in-law absolutist Charles XII in the Great Northern War, and the abdication of his wife, Charles's sister and successor Ulrika Eleonora, after she had to relinquish most powers to the Riksdag of the Estates and thus chose to abdicate. His powerless reign and lack of legitimate heirs of his own saw his family's elimination from the line of succession after the parliamentary government dominated by pro-revanchist Hat Party politicians ventured into a war with Russia, which ended in defeat and the Russian tsarina Elizabeth getting Adolf Frederick of Holstein-Gottorp instated following the death of the king. Whilst being the only Swedish monarch called Frederick, he was Frederick I of Hesse-Kassel and thus Frederick I also of Sweden, though other Swedish monarchs with non-repeating names (such as Birger, Sigismund and Frederick's successor: Adolf Frederick) had not been enumerated.

== Early life ==
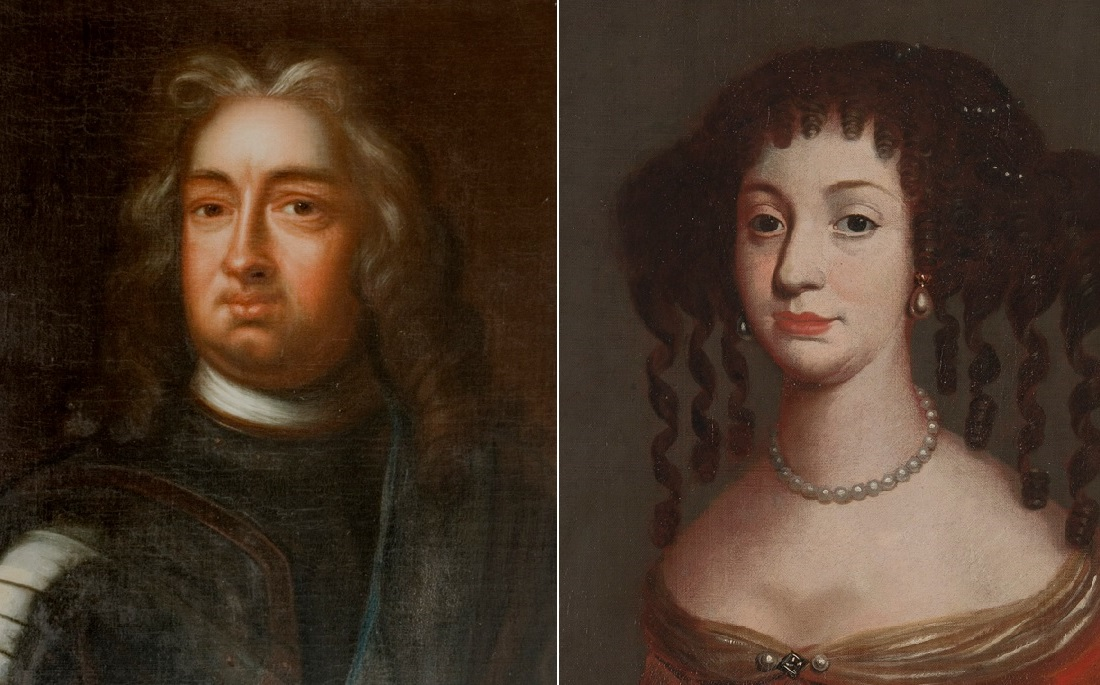
Frederick's parents, Landgrave Charles and Landgravine Maria Amalia of Hesse-Kassel

He was the son of Charles I, Landgrave of Hesse-Kassel, and Princess Maria Amalia of Courland. In 1692 the young prince made his Grand Tour to the Dutch Republic, in 1695 to the Italian Peninsula and later he studied in Geneva. After this he had a military career, leading the Hessian troops as Lieutenant General in the War of the Spanish Succession on the side of the Dutch. He was defeated in 1703 in the Battle of Speyerbach, but participated the next year in the great victory in the Battle of Blenheim. In 1706 he was again defeated by the French in the Battle of Castiglione. At the Battle of Malplaquet in 1709 he commanded the Dutch cavalry. In early 1712, in absence of Count Tilly, he briefly assumed the command of the Dutch army.

In 1716, he was wounded at the Battle of Høland. Two years later, in 1718, he joined the campaign of Charles XII of Sweden against Norway, and was appointed Swedish Generalissimus.

== Prince consort of Sweden ==
He married his second wife, Princess Ulrika Eleonora of Sweden, in 1715. He was then granted the title Prince of Sweden, with the style Royal Highness, by the estates, and was prince consort there during Ulrika Eleonora's rule as queen regnant from 1718 until her abdication in 1720. He is the only Swedish prince consort there has been to date. Frederick I had much influence during the reign of his spouse.

Some historians have suggested that the bullet which killed his brother-in-law Charles XII of Sweden in 1718 was actually fired by Frederick's aide André Sicre. Charles had been an authoritarian and demanding ruler; one reason the Swedish Estates elected Frederick was because he was taken to be fairly weak, which indeed he turned out to be.

== King of Sweden ==
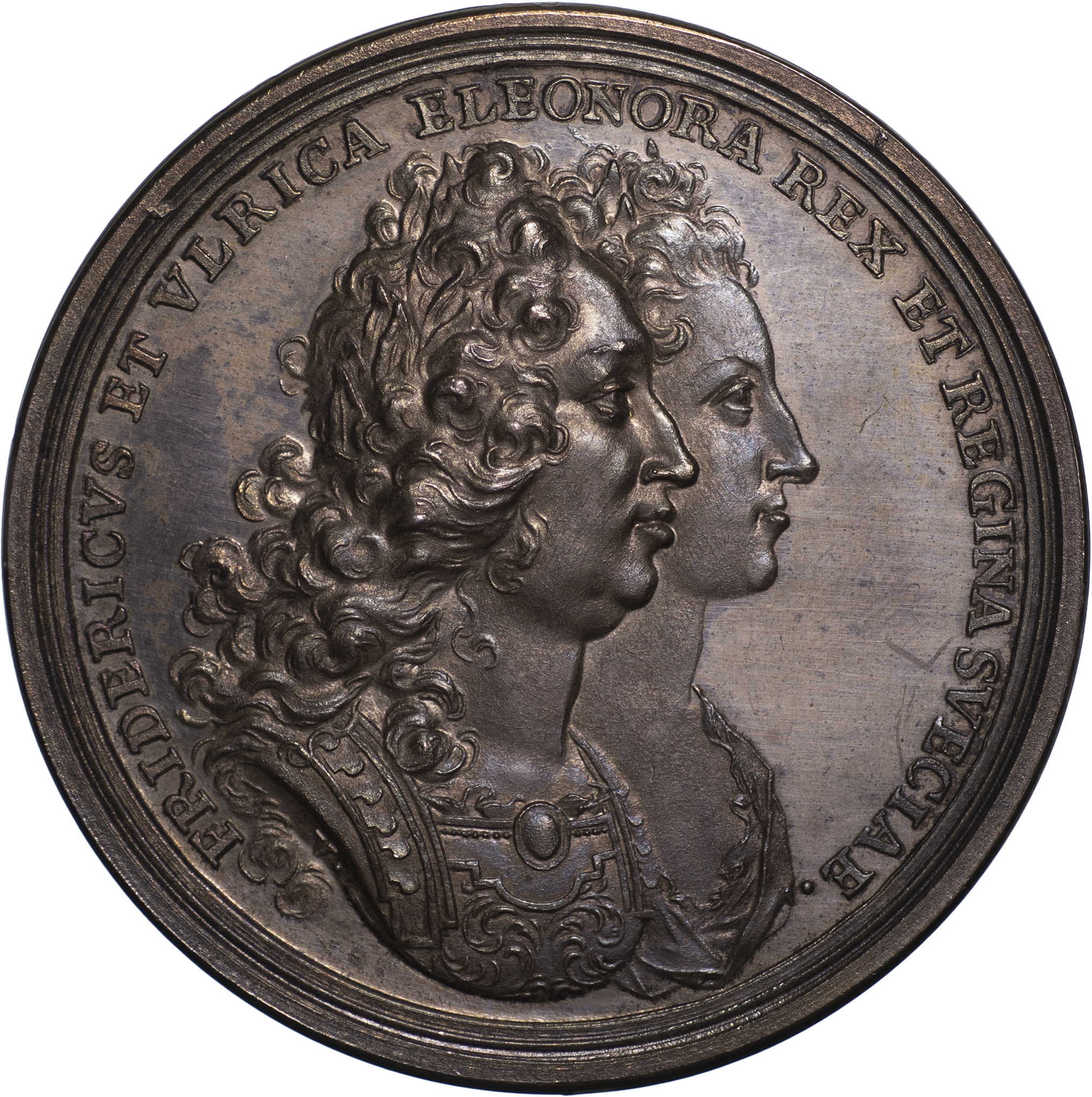
Coronation medal 1720

Frederick succeeded Ulrika Eleonora on the throne upon her abdication in his favor in 1720, elected by the Swedish Estates.

The defeats suffered by Charles XII in the Great Northern War ended Sweden's position as a first-rank European power. Under Frederick, this had to be accepted. Sweden also had to cede Estonia, Ingria and Livonia to Russia in the Treaty of Nystad, in 1721.

Frederick I was a very active and dynamic king at the beginning of his 31-year reign. But after the aristocracy had regained power during the wars with Russia, he became not so much powerless as uninterested in affairs of state. In 1723, he tried to strengthen royal authority, but after he failed, he never had much to do with politics. He did not even sign official documents; instead a stamp of his signature was used. He devoted most of his time to hunting and love affairs. His marriage to Queen Ulrika Eleonora was childless, but he had several children by his mistress, Hedvig Taube.

In 1723 Frederick rewarded the military inventor Sven Åderman with the estate of Halltorps on the island of Öland, for improving the rate of fire of the musket.

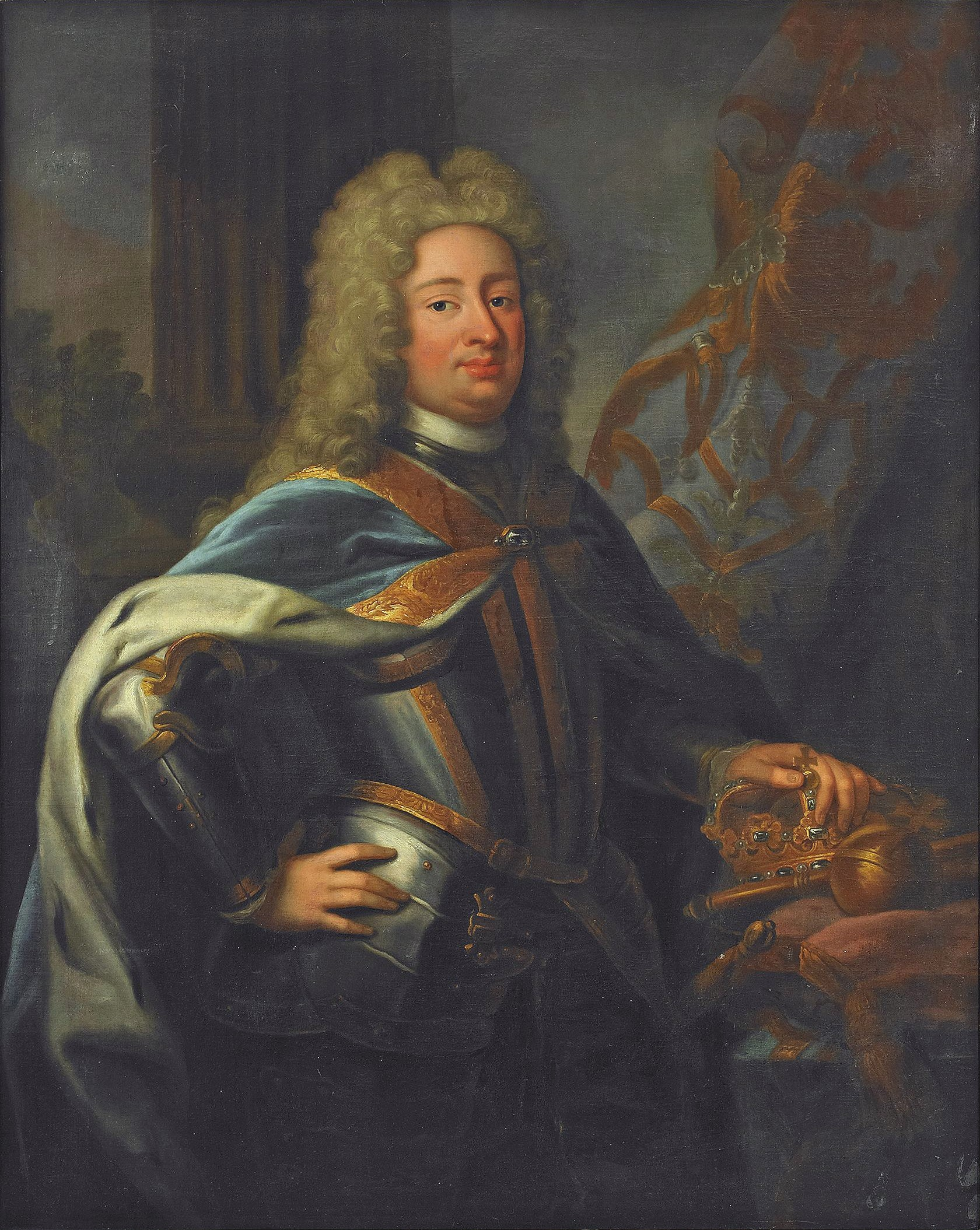
Frederick I in armour

As a king, he was not very respected. When he was crowned, it was said of him: "King Charles we recently buried, King Frederick we crown – suddenly the clock has now passed from twelve to one". It is said about him, that although a lot of great achievements in the country's development happened during his reign, he never had anything to do with them himself. When he died, Carl Gustaf Tessin said about him:

Under the reign of King Frederick, science has developed – he never bothered to read a book. The merchant business has flourished – he has never encouraged it with a single coin. The Stockholm Palace has been built – he has never been curious enough to look at it.

Neither did he have anything to do with the founding of the first Swedish speaking theater at Bollhuset during his reign. One of his few important policies was the banning of duels.

On 23 February 1748 Frederick I instituted the three Swedish royal orders of the Seraphim, of the Sword and of the Polar Star, the three principal Swedish orders of chivalry.

== Landgrave of Hesse-Kassel ==
Frederick became Landgrave of Hesse only in 1730, ten years after becoming King of Sweden. He immediately appointed his younger brother William governor of Hesse.

As Landgrave, Frederick is generally not seen as a success. Indeed, he did concentrate more on Sweden, and due to his negotiated, compromise-like ascension to the throne there, he and his court had a very low income. The money for that very expensive court, then, since the 1730s came from wealthy Hesse, and this means that Frederick essentially behaved like an absentee landlord and drained Hessian resources to finance life in Sweden. Also, Frederick's father, Charles I of Hesse-Kassel, had been the state's most successful ruler, rebuilding the state over his decades-long rule by means of economic and infrastructure measures and state reform, as well as tolerance, such as attracting, for economic purposes, the French Huguenots. His brother the governor, who would succeed Frederick as Landgrave William VIII of Hesse-Kassel, though by background a distinguished soldier, was likewise a great success locally. There are very few physical remainders of Frederick in Hesse today; one of them is his large Royal Swedish paraph (FR) over the old door of the University of Marburg's former riding hall, now the Institute of Physical Education.

== Ancestry ==
Ancestors of Frederick I of Sweden

8. William V, Landgrave of Hesse-Kassel
4. William VI, Landgrave of Hesse-Kassel
9. Countess Amalie Elisabeth of Hanau-Münzenberg
2. Charles I, Landgrave of Hesse-Kassel
10. George William, Elector of Brandenburg
5. Margravine Hedwig Sophie of Brandenburg
11. Elizabeth Charlotte of the Palatinate
1. Frederick I of Sweden
12. Wilhelm Kettler, Duke of Courland
6. Jacob Kettler, Duke of Courland
13. Duchess Sophie of Prussia
3. Maria Amalia of Courland
14. George William, Elector of Brandenburg (= 10)
7. Margravine Louise Charlotte of Brandenburg
15. Elizabeth Charlotte of the Palatinate (= 11)

== Family and issue ==
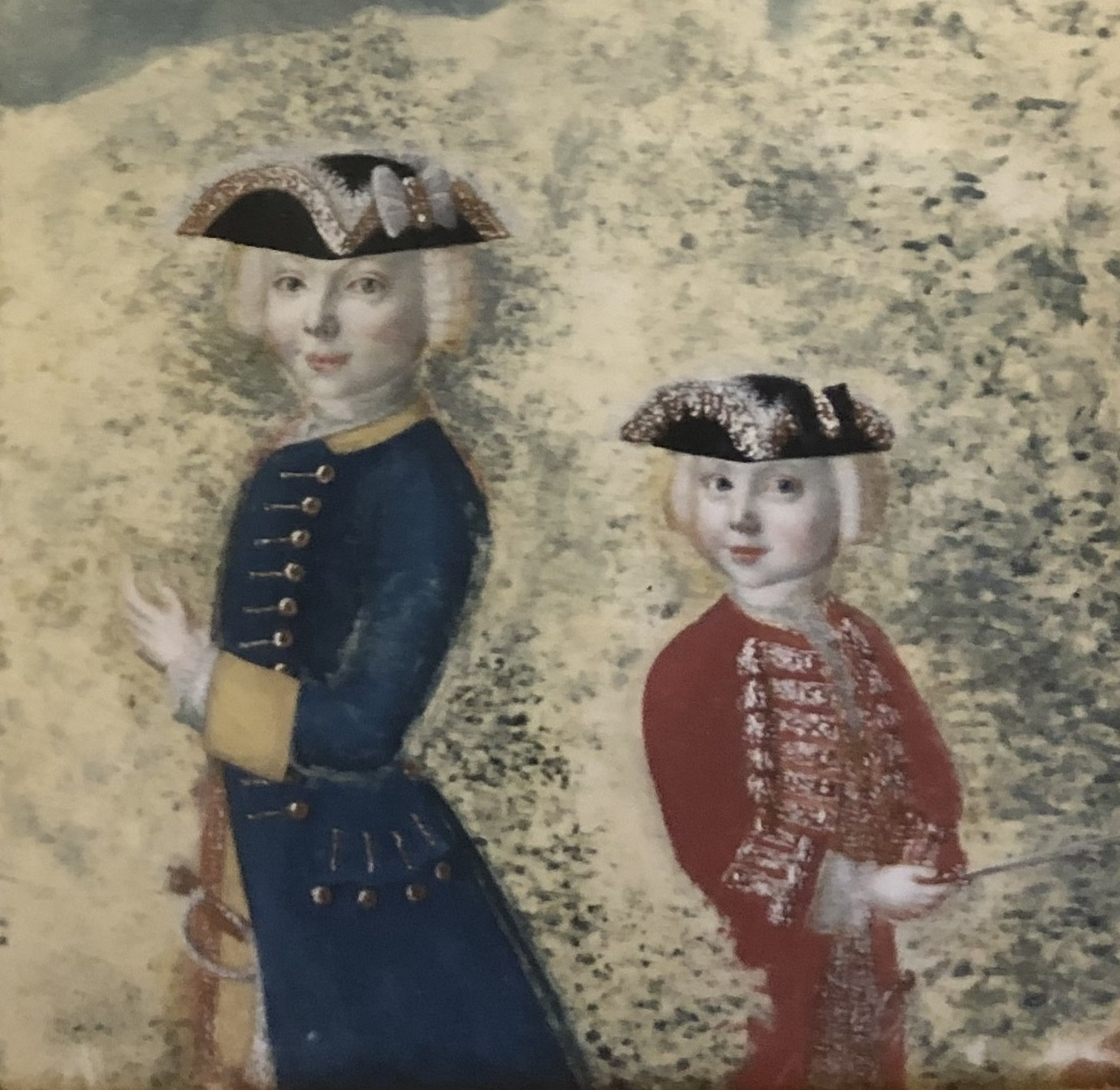
King Frederick's extramarital sons Frederick William and Charles Edward von Hessenstein

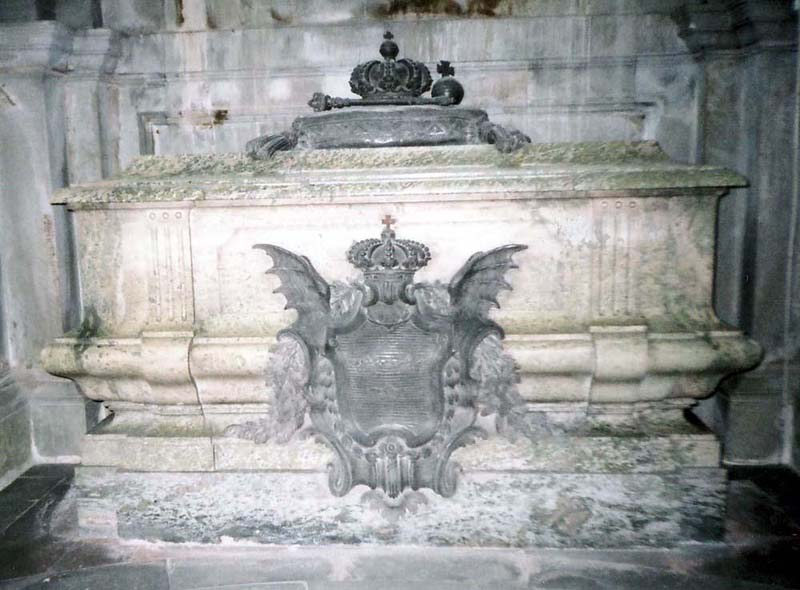
Frederick's sarcophagus in Riddarholmen Church

On 31 May 1700, he married his first wife, Luise Dorothea, Princess of Prussia, daughter of Frederick I of Prussia and Elisabeth Henriette of Hesse-Kassel. Luise Dorothea died in childbirth in December 1705.

His second wife, whom he married in 1715, was Ulrika Eleonora, Princess of Sweden, daughter of Charles XI of Sweden and of Ulrika Eleonora of Denmark. Ulrika suffered two miscarriages, one in 1715 and another in 1718, after which there are no further recorded pregnancies.

Frederick I had three extramarital children with his mistress Hedvig Taube:

- Frederick William von Hessenstein (1735–1808).
- Charles Edward von Hessenstein (1737–1769).
- Hedwig Amalia von Hessenstein (1743–1752).

After the death of Hedvig Taube, his official mistress was the noblewoman Catharina Ebba Horn (1720–1781), whom he gave the title and recognition of Countess (from 1745).

Thus, the Hessian line in Sweden ended with him and was followed by that of Holstein-Gottorp. In Hesse-Kassel, he was succeeded by his younger brother William VIII, a famous general.

Frederick I of Sweden House of Hesse-Kassel Cadet branch of the House of Hesse Born: 23 April 1676 Died: 25 March 1751
Regnal titles
Preceded by Ulrika Eleonora	King of Sweden; 1720–1751	Succeeded by Adolf Frederick
Preceded by Ulrika Eleonora	Duke of Estonia; 1720–1721	Succeeded by Peter I
Preceded by Charles I	Landgrave of Hesse-Kassel; 1730–1751	Succeeded by William VIII
Swedish royalty
Preceded by Ulrika Eleonora of Denmark as queen consort	Prince consort of Sweden; 1718–1720	Succeeded by Ulrika Eleonora of Sweden as queen consort
