= Maria Amalia of Courland =

Landgravine consort of Hesse-Kassel
- Tenure: 21 May 1673 – 16 June 1711
- Born: 12 June 1653; Mitau
- Died: 16 June 1711 (aged 58); Weilmünster
- Burial: Martinskirche, Kassel
- Spouse: Charles I, Landgrave of Hesse-Kassel (m. 1673)
- Issue: Frederick I of Sweden; Christian; Sophie Charlotte, Duchess of Mecklenburg; Karl; William VIII, Landgrave of Hesse-Kassel; Leopold; Ludwig; Marie Luise, Princess of Orange; Maximilian; George Charles; Eleonore Antoine; Wilhelmine Charlotte
Names
- Maria Anna Amalia Kettler
- House: Ketteler
- Father: Jacob of Courland
- Mother: Louise Charlotte of Brandenburg

Princess Maria Amalia of Courland (Maria Anna Amalia Kettler; 12 June 1653 – 16 June 1711) was a Landgravine of Hesse-Kassel by her marriage to Charles I, Landgrave of Hesse-Kassel. She was a daughter of Jacob Kettler, Duke of Courland and Semigallia and Margravine Louise Charlotte of Brandenburg. Her eldest son was King Frederick I of Sweden. One of her daughters was the most recent common ancestor of all the currently reigning monarchs of Europe from 1939 to 1941 and 1943 to 2022.

== Life ==
Maria Amalia was a daughter of Jacob Kettler, Duke of Courland and Semigallia and his wife, Princess Louise Charlotte of Brandenburg.

From 1658 to 1660, during the Northern Wars, Maria Amalia and her family were kept as prisoners by the invading Swedes in Riga and later in Ivangorod.

She was first engaged to her first cousin William VII, Landgrave of Hesse-Kassel (1651–1670), but he died during his Grand Tour. She was then engaged to William's younger brother and heir, Charles I, Landgrave of Hesse-Kassel (1654–1730), whom she married on 21 May 1673 in Kassel.

As landgravine, she participated in the creation of the Karlsaue Park in Kassel. The Marmor fountain in the park contains a medallion by the French sculptor Pierre Etienne Monnot depicting Maria Amalia. In 1699, together with her son Maximilian, she bought Sensenstein Castle. She was described as modest, affable and pious.

Maria Amalia died in 1711 and was buried in the Martinskirche of Kassel. The village of Mariendorf in Hesse, Germany was named in her memory.

== Issue ==
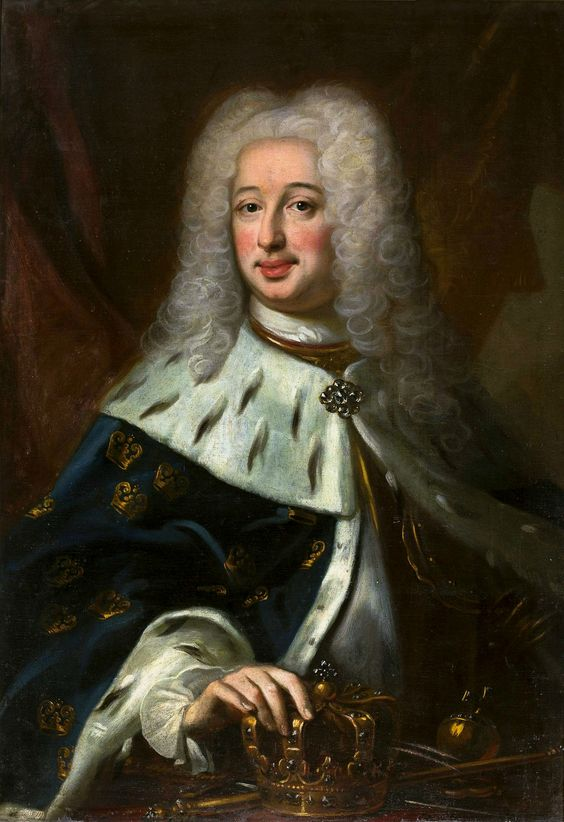
Frederick I of Sweden, Maria Amalia's eldest surviving son

Maria Amalia and her husband Charles had fourteen children, ten of whom survived to adulthood. Their eldest surviving son, Frederick I succeeded his father as Landgrave of Hesse-Kassel, while also becoming King of Sweden; their second-eldest surviving son William VIII also became landgrave after his brother's death.

- William (1674–1676), died in childhood
- Charles (1675–1677), died in childhood
- Frederick I (1676–1751), Landgrave of Hesse-Kassel, King of Sweden, married firstly Princess Louise Dorothea of Prussia (1680–1705) in 1700 and had no issue; married secondly Queen Ulrika Eleonora of Sweden (1688–1741) in 1715 and had no issue.
- Christian (1677–1677), died in infancy
- Sophie Charlotte (1678–1749), married Duke Frederick William of Mecklenburg-Schwerin (1675–1713) in 1704 and had no issue.
- Charles (1680–1702)
- William VIII (1682–1760), Landgrave of Hesse-Kassel, married Princess Dorothea Wilhelmina of Saxe-Zeitz (1691–1743) in 1717 and had issue.
- Leopold (1684–1704)
- Louis (1686–1706)
- Marie Luise (1688–1765), married Prince John William Friso of Nassau-Dietz (1687–1711) in 1709 and had issue; together with her husband, they were the most recent common ancestors of all the currently reigning monarchs of Europe from 1939 to 1941 and from 1943 to 2022.
- Maximilian (1689–1753), married Friederike Charlotte of Hesse-Darmstadt in 1720, and had issue.
- George Charles (1691–1755)
- Eleonore (1694), died in infancy
- Wilhelmine Charlotte (1695–1722)

== Ancestors ==
Ancestors of Maria Amalia of Courland

8. Gotthard Kettler
4. Wilhelm Kettler
9. Anna of Mecklenburg
2. Jacob Kettler
10. Albert Frederick, Duke of Prussia
5. Duchess Sophie of Prussia
11. Marie Eleonore of Cleves
1. Maria Amalia of Courland
12. John Sigismund, Elector of Brandenburg
6. George William, Elector of Brandenburg
13. Duchess Anna of Prussia
3. Margravine Louise Charlotte of Brandenburg
14. Frederick IV, Elector Palatine
7. Elizabeth Charlotte of the Palatinate (1597–1660)
15. Countess Louise Juliana of Nassau

== References and sources ==
- Christian Röth: Geschichte von Hessen p. 305
- Ulrich Schoenborn (2010), Mit Herz und Verstand: Biographie und Lebenswelt der Töchter Herzog Jakobs von Kurland in Hessen-Homburg, Herford und Hessen-Kassel, Hamburg: Kovač, ISBN 978-3-8300-4667-7

Maria Amalia of Courland Ketteler Born: 12 June 1653 Died: 16 June 1711
Royal titles
Vacant Title last held by Hedwig Sophie of Brandenburg	Landgravine of Hesse-Kassel; 21 May 1673 – 16 June 1711	Vacant Title next held by Ulrika Eleonora of Sweden
