= Charles I of Hesse-Kassel =

Charles I
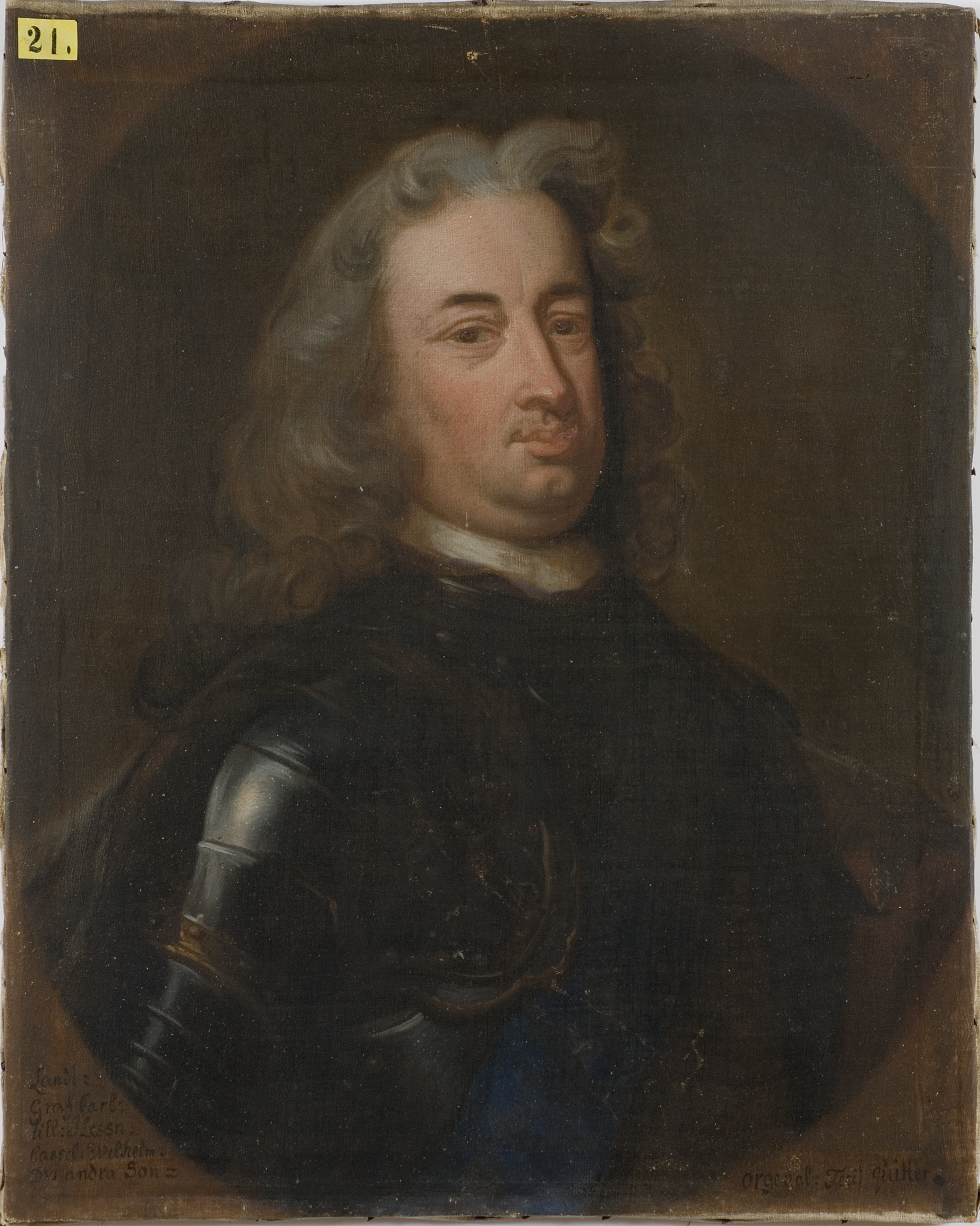

Landgrave of Hesse-Kassel
- Reign: 21 November 1670 – 23 March 1730
- Predecessor: William VII
- Successor: Frederick I
- Born: 3 August 1654; Kassel, Landgraviate of Hesse
- Died: 23 March 1730 (aged 75); Kassel, Landgraviate of Hesse
- Spouse: Maria Amalia of Courland (m. 1673; died 1711)
- Issue details…: Wilhelm; Karl; Frederick I of Sweden; Christian; Sophie Charlotte; Karl; William VIII, Landgrave of Hesse-Kassel; Leopold; Ludwig; Marie Luise, Princess of Orange; Maximilian; George Charles; Eleonore Antoine; Wilhelmine Charlotte
- House: Hesse-Kassel
- Father: William VI, Landgrave of Hesse-Kassel
- Mother: Hedwig Sophia of Brandenburg
- Religion: Calvinism

Charles of Hesse-Kassel (German: Karl von Hessen-Kassel; 3 August 1654 – 23 March 1730), member of the House of Hesse, was the Landgrave of Hesse-Kassel from 1670 to 1730.

== Childhood ==
Charles was the second son of William VI, Landgrave of Hesse-Kassel, and Hedwig Sophia of Brandenburg. Until 1675 his mother ruled as his guardian and regent before Charles was old enough to take over the administration for the next five years. His older brother, William VII, had died in 1670 shortly after reaching adulthood, even before he had had the chance to make any changes with the administration.

== Policies ==
Under the reign of Charles, the consequences of the Thirty Years' War in the agricultural county could be overcome more quickly than they were in the more industrialized regions of the Holy Roman Empire. He pushed for the recreation of a large army and put it in the service of other countries in the War of Spanish Succession. His soldiers, he gave, as well as other princes of his time, to foreign service for the Subsidiengelder [ subsidies ]. This policy remained controversial for its dealings with the mercenaries, according to the 1908 Brockhaus (Volume 9, page 96) :

Dieses System verbesserte die Finanzen, aber nicht den Wohlstand des Landes,
und brachte den glänzenden Hof selbst in ausländische Familienverbindungen.

[ This system improved the finances but not the prosperity of the country,
and brought to the brilliant court itself foreign familial connections. ]

Charles left in 1685 to his younger brother Philipp as the latter's Paragium a small part of the Landgraviate of Hesse, the so-called Landgraviate of Hesse–Philippsthal, named after Philippsthal [ "Philipp's Valley" ] (formerly Kreuzberg, a place near Vacha on the Werra River).

== Economy ==
Even before the Edict of Fontainebleau (October 1685), Charles adopted on 18 April 1685 the Freiheits-Concession [ "Freedom Concession" ], promising the exiles from France, the Huguenots and Waldensians, free settlement and their own churches and schools. In the following years, about 4000 the Protestants fled persecution in their homelands for Northern Hesse and, for example, about 1700 of them settled in Oberneustadt, the newly created borough of Kassel.

Following the ideas of mercantilism, Charles founded in 1679 the Messinghof, one of the first metal-processing plants in Hesse, in Bettenhausen, east of Kassel.

In 1699 Charles founded Sieburg (since 1717 Karlshafen) and also moved some of the Huguenots and Waldensians there. With the construction of the Landgrave-Carl-Canal from the Diemel River to Kassel (and beyond), he tried to circumvent the existing customs borders but, after only a few kilometers, the construction was discontinued.

== Culture ==
Landgrave Charles continued the design of the hillside park, Wilhelmshöhe ("William's Peak") in the Habichtswald ("Hawk Forest"), now a nature preserve west of Kassel. In particular, it was the construction of the Hercules monument that brought the Italian-inspired cascades and other water features to the park. Under his rule, the Moritzaue ("Maurice's Meadow") park near the town was extended over a large area to another park, the Karlsaue ("Charles's Meadow"), which still exists today, and the Schloss Orangerie was built.

With the participation of the Landgrave, who was interested in history, the first archaeological excavations began in 1709 on the Mader Heide.

== Family ==
Charles married his first cousin, Maria Amalia of Courland, the daughter of Jacob Kettler, Duke of Courland, and had with her fourteen children, ten of whom survived to adulthood. Their eldest surviving son, Frederick I succeeded his father as Landgrave of Hesse-Kassel, while also becoming King of Sweden; their second-eldest surviving son William VIII also became landgrave after his brother's death.

- William (29 March 1674 – 25 July 1676), died in childhood
- Charles (24 February 1675 – 7 December 1677), died in childhood
- Friedrich (28 April 1676 – 5 April 1751), who succeeded his father as Frederick, the Landgrave of Hesse-Kassel, and became, in 1720, the King of Sweden.

∞ 1stly 1700 Princess Louisa Dorothea of Brandenburg (1680–1705)
∞ 2ndly 1715 Ulrika Eleonora, Queen of Sweden (1688–1741)

- Christian (2 July 1677 – 18 September 1677), died in infancy
- Sophie Charlotte (16 July 1678 – 30 May 1749)

∞ 1704 Frederick William, Duke of Mecklenburg-Schwerin (1675–1713)

- Charles (12 June 1680 – 13 November 1702)
- William (10 March 1682 – 1 February 1760), who succeeded his brother Frederick as William VIII, the Landgrave of Hesse-Kassel

∞ 1717 Dorothea Wilhelmina of Saxe-Zeitz (1691–1743)

- Leopold (30 December 1684 – 10 September 1704)
- Louis (5 September 1686 – 23 May 1706)
- Marie Louise (7 February 1688 – 9 April 1765)

∞ 1709 Johan Willem Friso, Prince of Orange (1687–1711)

- Maximilian (28 May 1689 – 8 May 1753)

∞ 1720 Friederike Landgravine of Hesse-Darmstadt (1698–1777)

- George Charles (8 January 1691 – 5 March 1755)
- Eleonore Antoine (11 January 1694 – 17 December 1694)
- Wilhelmine Charlotte (8 July 1695 – 27 November 1722)

Maria Amalia also suffered many miscarriages:

- A miscarried daughter (12 June 1679)
- A miscarried daughter (12 April 1681)
- A miscarried daughter (12 June 1683)
- A miscarried son (12 November 1685)
- A miscarriage (12 February 1687)
- A miscarried daughter (12 January 1690)
- A miscarried son (12 March 1693)
- A miscarried son (12 July 1697)
- A miscarried daughter (12 May 1698)
- A miscarried son (12 June 1699)
- A miscarried daughter (12 January 1701)
- A miscarriage (12 November 1703)

== Other Relationships ==
After the death of his wife in 1713, Charles had a relationship with Jeanne Marguerite de Frere, Marquise de Langallerie (b. 1685), with whom he had a son, Charles Frederic Philippe de Gentil, Marquis de Langallerie, who died early. Charles secured in the same way the financial security of children who had come with his mistress.

After the Marquise de Langallerie, the next mistress and confidante was Barbara Christine von Bernhold (1690–1756), who rose to Großhofmeisterin ("Senior Mistress of the Court") under Charles's son William VIII and was raised to the rank of Reichsgräfin ("Imperial Countess") in 1742 by the Holy Roman Emperor Charles VII. She was housed in the Bellevue Palace.

== Ancestry ==
Ancestors of Charles I of Hesse-Kassel

8. Maurice, Landgrave of Hesse-Kassel
4. William V, Landgrave of Hesse-Kassel
9. Countess Agnes of Solms-Laubach
2. William VI, Landgrave of Hesse-Kassel
10. Philip Louis II, Count of Hanau-Münzenberg
5. Countess Amalie Elisabeth of Hanau-Münzenberg
11. Countess Catharina Belgica of Nassau
1. Charles I, Landgrave of Hesse-Kassel
12. John Sigismund, Elector of Brandenburg
6. George William, Elector of Brandenburg
13. Duchess Anna of Prussia
3. Margravine Hedwig Sophie of Brandenburg
14. Frederick IV, Elector Palatine
7. Countess Palatine Elizabeth Charlotte of Simmern
15. Countess Louise Juliana of Nassau

== Bibliography ==
- (in German) [Theodor] Ilgen, "Karl", "Allgemeine Deutsche Biographie [ General German Biography ] (ADB), Band 15 [ Volume 15 ] (Leipzig: Duncker & Humblot, 1882), pages 292–296
- (in German) Hans Philippi, Landgraf Karl von Hessen-Kassel. Ein deutscher Fürst der Barockzeit [ Landgrave Charles of Hesse-Kassel: A German Prince of the Baroque Times ] (Veröffentlichungen der Historischen Kommission für Hessen, Number 34 [ Publications of the Historical Commission of Hesse, Number 34 ]) (Marburg: Elwert, 1976), ISBN 978-3770805648
- (in German) Hans Philippi, "Karl", Neue Deutsche Biographie [ New German Biography ] (NDB), Band 11 [ Volume 11 ] (Berlin: Duncker & Humblot, 1977), ISBN 3-428-00192-3, pages 227-229 (digitized)
- (in German) Pauline Puppel, Die Regentin. Vormundschaftliche Herrschaft in Hessen 1500–1700 [ The Lady Regents: Reigning Guardianship in Hesse 1500-1700 ] (Frankfurt am Main: Campus, 2004), ISBN 978-0-521-81422-5, pages 236–277

Charles I of Hesse-Kassel House of Hesse-Kassel Cadet branch of the House of Hesse Born: 3 August 1654 Died: 23 March 1730
Regnal titles
Preceded by William VII	Landgrave of Hesse-Kassel; 1670–1730	Succeeded by Frederick I
