= Barbara Christine von Bernhold =

German noble

Barbara Christine von Bernhold, Countess Bernhold zu Eschau
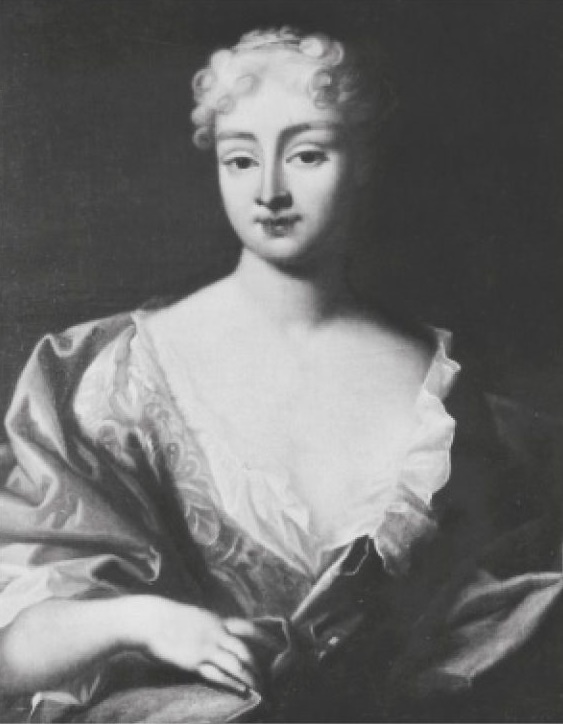
- Barbara-Christine von Bernhold zu Eschau
- Born: 1690
- Died: 1756 (aged 65–66)
- Occupations: noblewoman and court lady
- Known for: official royal mistress of Charles I, Landgrave of Hesse-Kassel, political adviser, first lady and head of the court of William VIII, Landgrave of Hesse-Kassel

Barbara Christine von Bernhold, Countess Bernhold zu Eschau (1690–1756), was a German noblewoman and court lady. She was the official royal mistress of Charles I, Landgrave of Hesse-Kassel in 1711-1730, and the political adviser, first lady and head of the court of William VIII, Landgrave of Hesse-Kassel between 1730 and 1756.

== Biography ==
She was the daughter of the Hessian nobleman and officer Johann Ludwig von Bernhold zu Eschau and Anna Lucretia von Stein. After the death of Maria Amalia of Courland in 1711, she became the official mistress of Charles I. She had a good relationship to his sons, and after his death in 1730, she was allowed to remain at court. She became the head of the court of William in 1730, and because his consort Dorothea Wilhelmine of Saxe-Zeitz was imprisoned due to mental illness, she acted ceremoniously as the first lady of the court. She also exerted political influence over William, as he made her his political adviser. In 1742 Barabara Christine was awarded with the title of Imperial Countess by Charles VII. She was housed in the Bellevue Palace.

== Sources ==
- Susanne Köttelwesch: Barbara Christine von Bernhold. In: Jahrbuch des Landkreises Kassel 2001, Kassel, S. 17 ff.
- Uta Löwenstein: Höfisches Leben und höfische Repräsentation in Hessen-Kassel im 18. Jahrhundert (pdf; 58 kB), S. 40
- Peter Naumann: Die landgräfliche Nebenfrau Barbara Christine von Bernhold: Eine Verbindung zum Kupferbergbau und zur Kupferverhüttung in Nordhessen. in: *P.N. Geo-Jahreschronik Nordhessen, Nr. 8, Selbstverlag, 2001
