= William VII of Hesse-Kassel =

William VII
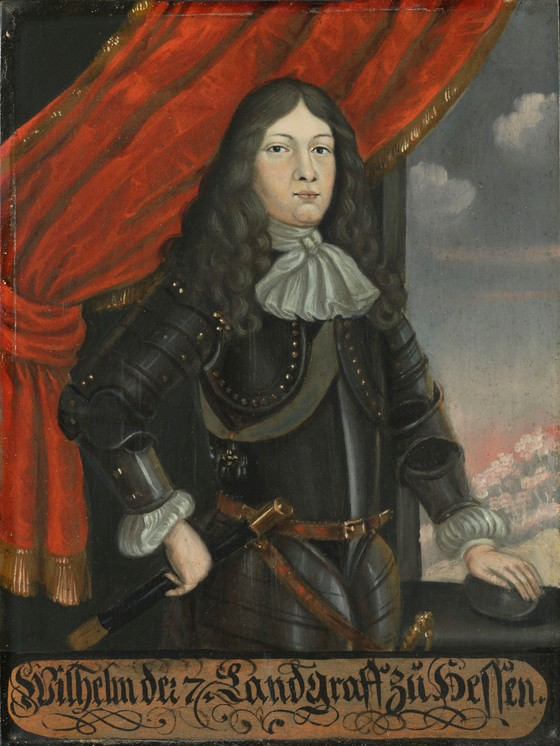
- Anonymous portrait (17th century)

Landgrave of Hesse-Kassel
- Reign: 16 July 1663 – 21 November 1670
- Predecessor: William VI
- Successor: Charles I
- Born: 21 June 1651; Kassel
- Died: 21 November 1670 (aged 19); Paris
- Burial: Martinskirche, Kassel
- House: Hesse
- Father: William VI, Landgrave of Hesse-Kassel
- Mother: Hedwig Sophie of Brandenburg

William VII of Hesse-Kassel (21 June 1651 – 21 November 1670) was Landgrave of Hesse-Kassel.

== Life ==
William was the eldest son of Landgrave William VI of Hesse-Kassel and his wife, Hedwig Sophie of Brandenburg. William VII inherited the landgraviate when his father died in 1663. Since he was still a minor, his mother became regent.

William was engaged with his cousin Maria Amalia of Courland, the daughter of Jacob of Courland (her mother was the sister of William's mother). After the engagement, he embarked on his Grand Tour to the Netherlands, England and France. In Paris, he became very ill with a "fever". The French doctors tried to cure the 19-year-old landgrave with laxatives, emetics, enemas and bloodletting, yet the treatment killed him.

He was buried in the Martinskirche, Kassel. His fiancée married his younger brother and successor, Landgrave Charles.

== Ancestry ==
Ancestors of William VII of Hesse-Kassel

16. William IV, Landgrave of Hesse-Kassel
8. Maurice, Landgrave of Hesse-Kassel
17. Duchess Sabine of Württemberg
4. William V, Landgrave of Hesse-Kassel
18. John George, Count of Solms-Laubach
9. Countess Agnes of Solms-Laubach
19. Countess Margaret of Schönburg-Glauchau
2. William VI, Landgrave of Hesse-Kassel
20. Philip Louis I, Count of Hanau-Münzenberg
10. Philip Louis II, Count of Hanau-Münzenberg
21. Magdalene of Waldeck-Wildungen
5. Countess Amalie Elisabeth of Hanau-Münzenberg
22. William the Silent (=#30)
11. Countess Catharina Belgica of Nassau
23. Charlotte of Bourbon (=#31)
1. William VII, Landgrave of Hesse-Kassel
24. Joachim III Frederick, Elector of Brandenburg
12. John Sigismund, Elector of Brandenburg
25. Margravine Catherine of Brandenburg-Küstrin
6. George William, Elector of Brandenburg
26. Albert Frederick, Duke of Prussia
13. Duchess Anna of Prussia
27. Duchess Marie Eleonore of Cleves
3. Margravine Hedwig Sophie of Brandenburg
28. Louis VI, Elector Palatine
14. Frederick IV, Elector Palatine
29. Landgravine Elisabeth of Hesse
7. Countess Palatine Elizabeth Charlotte of Simmern
30. William the Silent (=#22)
15. Countess Louise Juliana of Nassau
31. Charlotte of Bourbon (=#23)

William VII of Hesse-Kassel House of Hesse Born: 21 June 1651 Died: 21 November 1670
Regnal titles
Preceded by Wilhelm VI	Landgrave of Hesse-Kassel; 1663–1670	Succeeded by Charles
