= Völkershausen =

- Ortsteil of Vacha
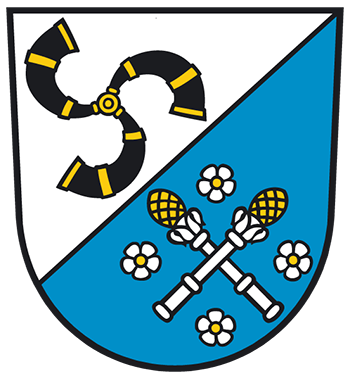
- Coat of arms
- Interactive map of Völkershausen
- Location within Germany Location within Thuringia
- Coordinates: 50°47′55″N 10°2′45″E
- Country: Germany
- State: Thuringia
- District: Wartburgkreis
- Town: Vacha

Area
  - Total: 14.19 km^{2} (5.48 sq mi)
- Elevation: 330 m (1,080 ft)

Population (2012-12-31)
  - Total: 1,176
  - Density: 82.88/km^{2} (214.6/sq mi)
- Time zone: UTC+01:00 (CET)
  - Summer (DST): UTC+02:00 (CEST)
- Postal codes: 36404
- Dialling codes: 036962
- Vehicle registration: WAK

Völkershausen (German pronunciation: [fœlkɐsˈhaʊzn̩]) is a village and a former municipality in the Wartburgkreis district of Thuringia, Germany. Since 31 December 2013, it is part of the town Vacha.

On 13 March 1989, it was struck by an earthquake of magnitude 5.6, which was triggered by an explosion in the salt mine "Merkers". Several buildings, including the Church and the kindergarten, were damaged and had to be newly built. People were not hurt seriously.
