= Princess Hedwig Sophie of Brandenburg =

German royalty

Hedwig Sophia of Brandenburg
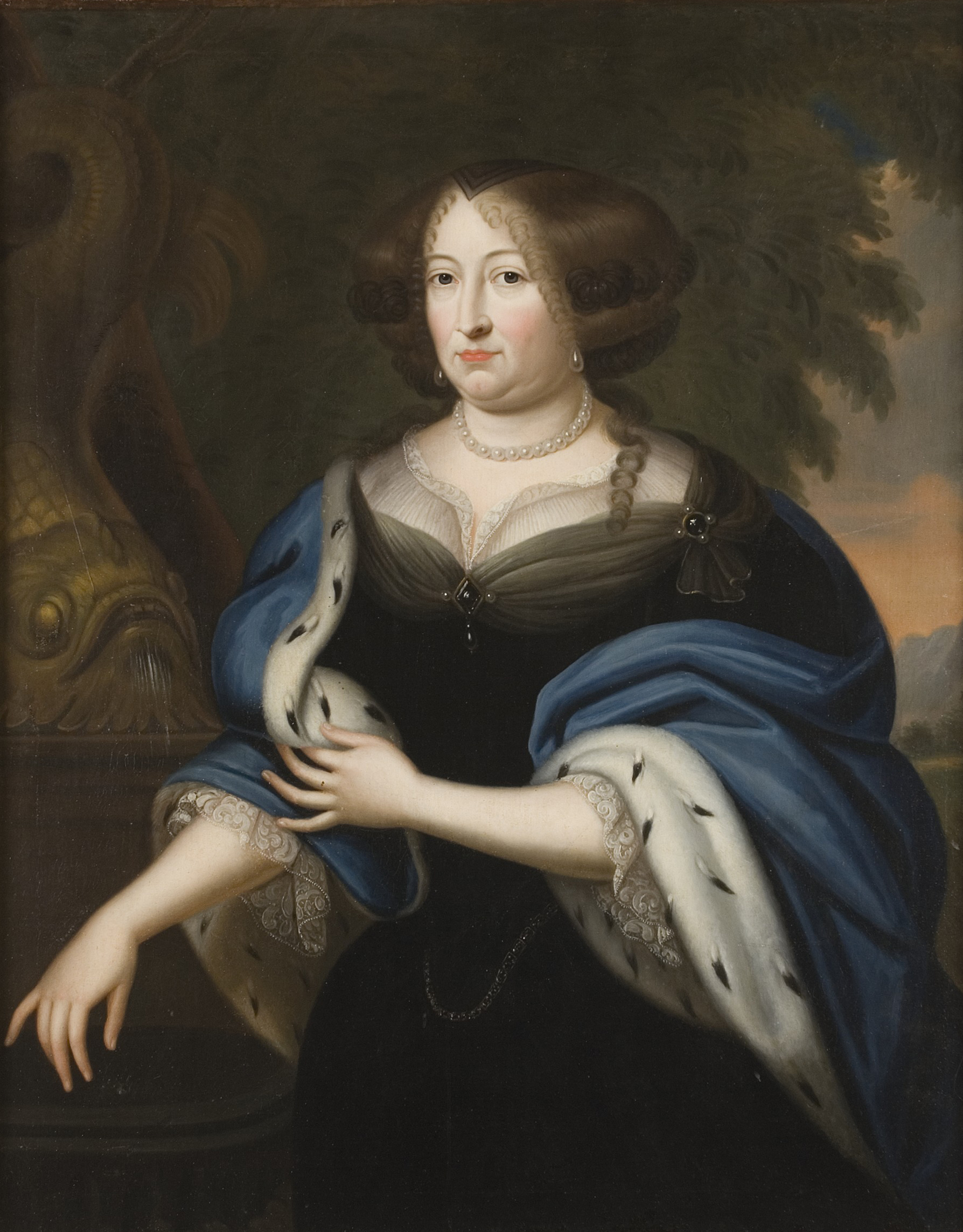
- Portrait of Hedwig Sophie by an anonymous artist, 17th century

Landgravine consort of Hesse-Kassel
- Tenure: 1649 – 16 July 1663
- Born: 14 July 1623; Berlin
- Died: 26 June 1683 (aged 59); Schmalkalden
- Spouse: William VI, Landgrave of Hesse-Kassel (m. 1649; died 1663)
- Issue: Charlotte Amelie, Queen of Denmark; William VII, Landgrave of Hesse-Kassel; Luise; Charles I, Landgrave of Hesse-Kassel; Philip, Landgrave of Hesse-Philippsthal; Georg; Elisabeth Henriëtte, Electoral Princess of Brandenburg
- House: Hohenzollern
- Father: George William, Elector of Brandenburg
- Mother: Elizabeth Charlotte of the Palatinate

Hedwig Sophia of Brandenburg (14 July 1623, Berlin – 26 June 1683, Schmalkalden) was Landgravine consort of Hesse-Kassel by marriage to William VI, Landgrave of Hesse-Kassel, and regent from 1663 until 1677 during the minority of her sons, William VII, Landgrave of Hesse-Kassel and Charles I, Landgrave of Hesse-Kassel.

== Life ==
She was the daughter of George William, Elector of Brandenburg and Elizabeth Charlotte of the Palatinate. She married William VI, Landgrave of Hesse-Kassel in 1649.

=== Regency ===
Upon the death of her spouse in 1663, he was succeeded by their son, William VII, Landgrave of Hesse-Kassel. As his mother and guardian, she became regent. Her regency was terminated upon the death of her son in 1670, but as he was succeeded by her second son, Charles I, Landgrave of Hesse-Kassel, who was also a minor, she was confirmed as such again.

During her regency, she repaired the finances of the state, which had been drained during the Thirty Years' War, by raised taxes. She kept the peace despite French expansionism until 1673, when she allied with her brother in Brandenburg against France.

During her last years as regent, she delayed her mandate to the dislike of her son until she was forced to hand over the regency in 1677.

== Ancestry ==
Ancestors of Princess Hedwig Sophie of Brandenburg

8. Joachim Frederick, Elector of Brandenburg
4. John Sigismund, Elector of Brandenburg
9. Margravine Catherine of Brandenburg-Küstrin
2. George William, Elector of Brandenburg
10. Albert Frederick, Duke of Prussia
5. Duchess Anna of Prussia
11. Marie Eleonore of Cleves
1. Margravine Hedwig Sophie of Brandenburg
12. Louis VI, Elector Palatine
6. Frederick IV, Elector Palatine
13. Landgravine Elisabeth of Hesse
3. Elizabeth Charlotte of the Palatinate
14. William the Silent; Prince of Orange and Count of Nassau
7. Countess Louise Juliana of Nassau
15. Princess Charlotte of Bourbon

Royal titles
Vacant Title last held by Amalie Elisabeth of Hanau-Münzenberg	Landgravine of Hesse-Kassel; 9/19 July 1649 – 16 July 1663	Vacant Title next held by Maria Amalia of Courland
