= William VI of Hesse-Kassel =

William VI
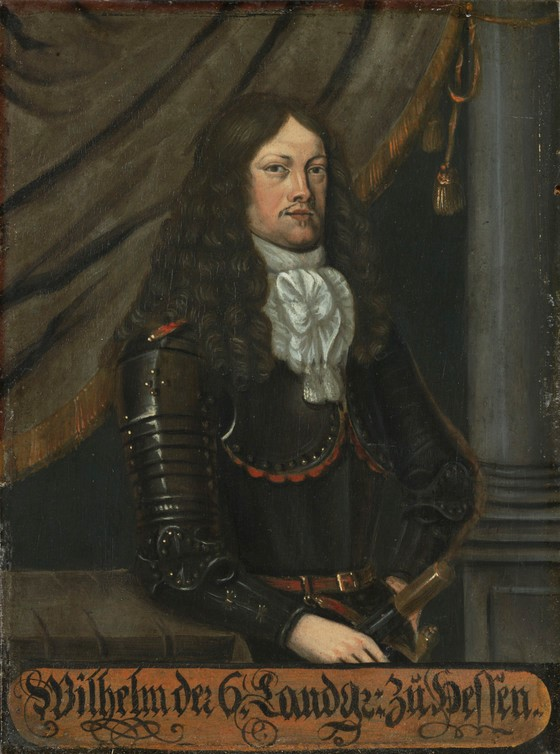
- 17th-century portrait

Landgrave of Hesse-Kassel
- Reign: 21 September 1637 – 16 July 1663
- Predecessor: William V
- Successor: William VII
- Regent: Amalie Elisabeth of Hanau-Münzenberg (1637 – 1650)
- Born: 23 May 1629; Kassel
- Died: 16 July 1663 (aged 34); Haina
- Spouse: Margravine Hedwig Sophie of Brandenburg (m. 1649)
- Issue: Charlotte Amelie, Queen of Denmark; William VII, Landgrave of Hesse-Kassel; Luise; Charles I, Landgrave of Hesse-Kassel; Philip, Landgrave of Hesse-Philippsthal; Georg; Elisabeth Henriëtte, Electoral Princess of Brandenburg
- House: Hesse-Kassel
- Father: William V, Landgrave of Hesse-Kassel
- Mother: Amalie Elisabeth von Hanau-Münzenberg
- Religion: Calvinism

Wilhelm VI, Landgrave of Hesse-Kassel (23 May 1629 – 16 July 1663), known as William the Just, was Landgrave of Hesse-Kassel from 1637 to 1663.

Through two of his surviving children, he is the ancestor of all the royal families of Europe.

== Life ==
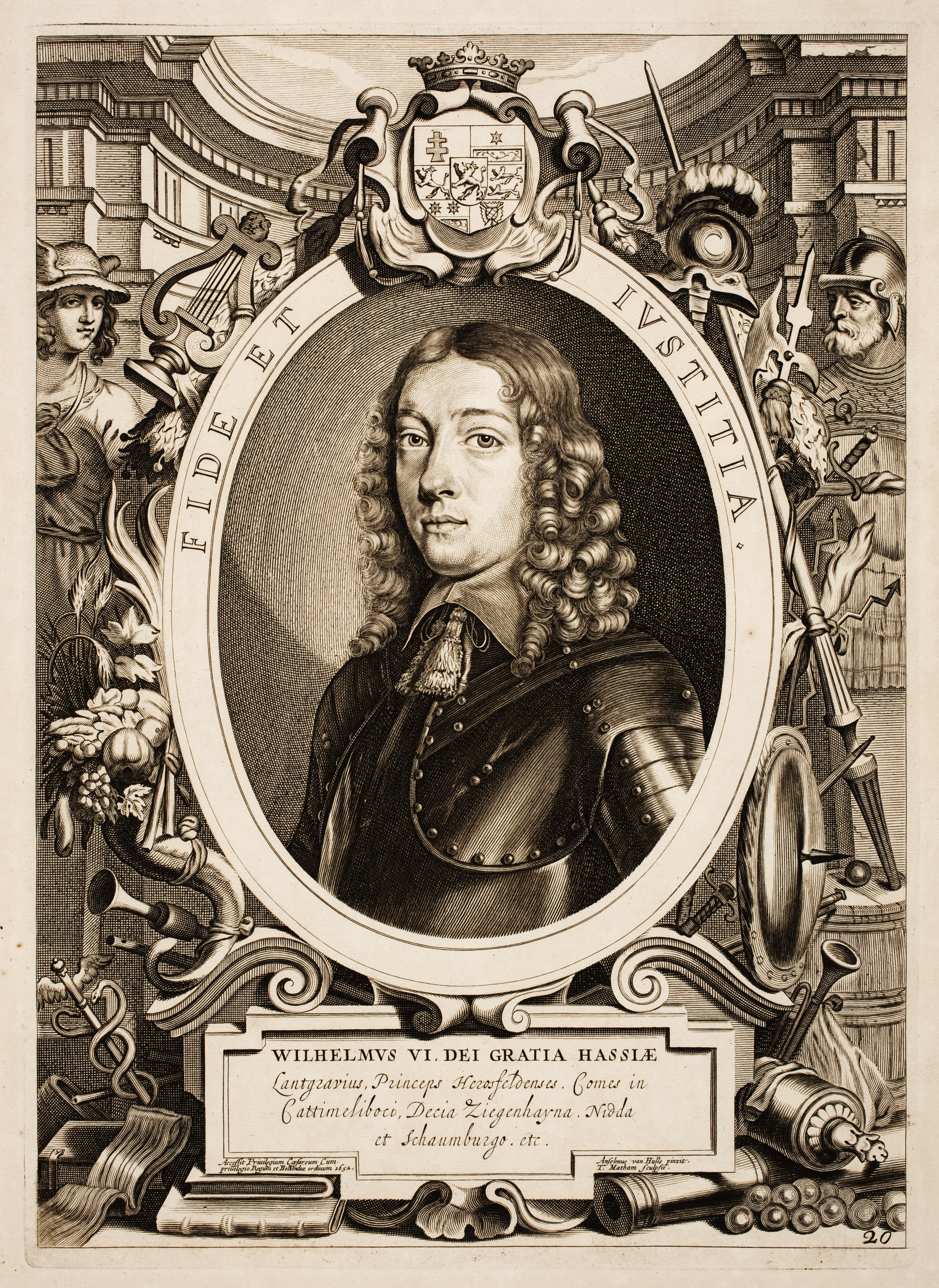
Engraving of William VI

Born in Kassel, he was the son of William V (whom he succeeded) and his wife Amalie Elisabeth, Gräfin of Hanau-Münzenberg (daughter of Philip Louis II of Hanau-Münzenberg and his wife Countess Catharina Belgica of Nassau).

His mother remained his guardian until he came of age, and she actually ran the government and diplomatic affairs.

Despite Hesse-Kassel's defeat in the Thirty Years' War, William's mother did not wish to acknowledge the accord of 1627. This required that the unmarried Marburger heir and the Landgraves of Hessen-Darmstadt should fall, but Amalie Elisabeth had other ideas and led Hesse-Kessel in 1645 into the "Hessenkrieg", ruling as Landgräfin on her son's behalf. This war began when Hesse-Kassel's troops began to besiege the city of Marburg. Three years later, in 1648, the war ended with a victory for Kassel, although the citizens of Darmstadt also gained from it. This was confirmed by the Treaty of Westphalia of 1648. Domination over the Marburger territories went over to the Landgrave of Hesse-Kassel after the accord was dissolved and a new agreement was reached. William VI succeeded in what his ancestors had tried to do in vain since 1604, that is, to end the Hesse-Marburg landgraviate, and to annex the Marburger lands to Hesse-Kassel.

After these wars, William attended above all to the extension of the universities within his domains and the foundation of more new Lehranstalts. To finally resolve the quarrel with the landgraves of Hesse-Darmstadt, Wilhelm delivered to George II the territory around Gießen, along with Ämtern by Biedenkopf.

Shortly before his death, William joined the League of the Rhine on its foundation in 1658. He also sought to effect a union between his Lutheran and Reformed subjects, or at least to lessen their mutual hatred. In 1661 he had a colloquy held in Kassel between the Lutheran theologians of the University of Rinteln and the Reformed theologians of the University of Marburg.

William VI died at Haina in 1663. Control of his Landgraviate went to his eldest son William VII, though - not yet of age - he remained under the guardianship of his mother Hedwig Sophie of Brandenburg until his early death in 1670.

== Marriage and issue ==
He married Margravine Hedwig Sophie of Brandenburg (1623–1683), daughter of daughter of George William, Elector of Brandenburg and Elizabeth Charlotte of the Palantine. Their children were:

- Charlotte Amalie of Hesse-Kassel (1650–1714), married Christian V of Denmark
- William VII (1651–1670), his successor, Landgraf 1663–1670.
- Luise (11 September 1652 - 23 October 1652)
- Charles (3 August 1654 – 23 March 1730), Landgraf 1670-1730
- Philipp (14 December 1655 – 18 June 1721), Landgrave of Hesse-Philippsthal, married Countess Katharina Amalia von Solms-Laubach
- George of Hesse-Kassel (1658–1675);
- Elisabeth Henriëtte (8 November 1661 – 27 June 1683), married Frederick I of Prussia

== Ancestors ==
Ancestors of William VI of Hesse-Kassel

8. William IV, Landgrave of Hesse-Kassel
4. Maurice, Landgrave of Hesse-Kassel
9. Duchess Sabine of Württemberg
2. William V, Landgrave of Hesse-Kassel
10. John George, Count of Solms-Laubach
5. Agnes of Solms-Laubach
11. Margaret of Schönburg-Glauchau
1. William VI, Landgrave of Hesse-Kassel
12. Philip Louis I, Count of Hanau-Münzenberg
6. Philip Louis II, Count of Hanau-Münzenberg
13. Magdalene of Waldeck-Wildungen
3. Countess Amalie Elisabeth of Hanau-Münzenberg
14. William the Silent
7. Countess Catharina Belgica of Nassau
15. Charlotte of Bourbon

== Literature ==
- Wilhelm Grotefend (1898). "Wilhelm VI." . Allgemeine Deutsche Biographie (in German). Vol. 43. Leipzig: Duncker & Humblot. pp. 54–60.
- Hans Philippi: Die Landgrafschaft Hessen-Kassel 1648–1806 = Veröffentlichungen der Historischen Kommission für Hessen 46 = Kleine Schriften 8, Marburg 2007. ISBN 978-3-7708-1303-2.
- Pauline Puppel: Die Regentin. Vormundschaftliche Herrschaft in Hessen 1500–1700. Frankfurt/Main 2004.

William VI of Hesse-Kassel House of Hesse Born: 23 May 1629 Died: 16 July 1663
Regnal titles
Preceded by William V	Landgrave of Hesse-Kassel; 1637 to 1663	Succeeded by William VII
