= Landgraviate of Hesse-Kassel =

State within the Holy Roman Empire from 1567 to 1803

Landgraviate of Hesse-Cassel Landgrafschaft Hessen-Cassel (German)
- 1567–1803
- Flag Coat of arms (1736–1804)

- Hesse-Kassel within the Holy Roman Empire in 1618
- Status: Landgraviate
- Capital: Kassel
- Common languages: German; Hessian
- Religion: Lutheranism; Calvinism (from 1605)
- Government: Absolute monarchy
- Landgrave
  - 1567–1592: William IV
  - 1730–1751: Frederick I, King of Sweden
  - 1751–1760: William VIII
  - 1760–1785: Frederick II
  - 1785–1803: William IX (Elector of Hesse to 1821)
- History
  - Established: 1567
  - Raised to Electorate: 1803

Population
  - 1605: 230,000
  - 1775: 300,000
| Preceded by | Succeeded by |
| Landgraviate of Hesse | Electorate of Hesse |
- Today part of: Germany

The Landgraviate of Hesse-Kassel (German: Landgrafschaft Hessen-Kassel), spelled Hesse-Cassel during its entire existence, (Note: Following the German spelling reform of the early 20th century, the town of Cassel became Kassel, long after the dissolution of Hesse-Kassel itself.) was a state of the Holy Roman Empire. The state was created in 1567 when the Landgraviate of Hesse was divided upon the death of Philip I, Landgrave of Hesse. His eldest son William IV inherited the northern half of the Landgraviate and the capital of Kassel. The other sons received the Landgraviates of Hesse-Marburg, Hesse-Rheinfels and Hesse-Darmstadt.

During the Napoleonic reorganisation of the Empire in 1803, the Landgrave of Hesse-Kassel was elevated to an Electorate and Landgrave William IX became an Imperial Elector. Many members of the House of Hesse-Kassel served in the Danish military, gaining high ranks and power in the realm because many Landgraves were married to Danish princesses. Members of the family who are known to have served Denmark-Norway include Prince Frederik of Hesse-Kassel, Prince Frederick of Hesse-Kassel, and Prince Charles of Hesse-Kassel. It had two votes to the Reichstag: one for itself and one for Hersfeld Abbey.

In 1801, Hesse was forced to cede land to Revolutionary France, but in 1803 it was compensated with land around the former Electorate of Mainz and was elevated to the status of Electorate as the Electorate of Hesse, officially ending the Landgraviate.

== History ==
The Landgraviate of Hesse-Kassel was founded by William IV the Wise, the eldest son of Philip I. On his father's death in 1567, the Landgraviate of Hesse was divided into four parts. William IV received about half of the territory, with Kassel as his capital. Hesse-Kassel expanded in 1604 when Maurice, Landgrave of Hesse-Kassel inherited the Landgraviate of Hesse-Marburg from his childless uncle, Louis IV, Landgrave of Hesse-Marburg (1537–1604).

=== Thirty Years' War ===
In 1605, Maurice became Calvinist. When the Thirty Years' War began, he was on the Protestant side. After being forced to cede some of his territories to Hesse-Darmstadt, Maurice abdicated in 1627 in favour of his son William V. His younger sons received appanages, which created several cadet lines in yet another partition of Hesse. William V allied himself with Gustavus Adolphus of Sweden and then France, losing most of Hesse-Kassel when Imperial troops invaded. He died in exile in 1637, leaving his widow Amalie Elisabeth of Hanau-Münzenberg to act as regent for their eight-year-old son William VI.

Amalie Elisabeth vigorously advanced the interests of Hesse-Kassel. After expelling Imperial troops from Hesse-Kassel, she sent troops to take the city of Marburg, which her father-in-law had lost to their Hesse-Darmstadt relatives. At the Peace of Westphalia in 1648, Hesse-Kassel was further rewarded with most of the County of Schaumburg and the newly secularized Hersfeld Abbey. Amalie Elisabeth also introduced the rule of primogeniture to prevent Hesse-Kassel from being divided again in the future. However, her health was ruined by the stresses of the war, and she died in 1651.

Hesse-Kassel was very heavily militarized for its population during the war (aided by French subsidies and funds obtained from looting), maintaining an average of about 10,000 soldiers in the field during the 1635-1648 phase (including 11,040 at the conclusion of the war in October 1648).

=== 17th and 18th centuries ===
William VI, who came of age in 1650, was an enlightened patron of learning and the arts. He was succeeded by his son William VII, Landgrave of Hesse-Kassel, then an infant, who died in 1670. He was succeeded by his brother Charles I. Charles' chief claim to fame is that he hired out his soldiers to foreign powers as auxiliaries, as a means of improving the finances of his principality. William V was succeeded by Landgraves William VI and William VII. Frederick I of Sweden, the next landgrave, became by marriage King of Sweden. Although the Landgraviate was in personal union with Sweden from 1730 to 1751, the king's younger brother, Prince William, ruled in Kassel as regent until he succeeded his brother as William VIII.

On Frederick I's death in 1751, he was succeeded by his brother William VIII, who fought as an ally of Kingdom of Great Britain during the Seven Years' War. His successor, Frederick II, converted to Catholicism after a long line of Protestant Landgraves. When the American Revolutionary War broke out, Frederick II leased Hessian troops to Great Britain for service in America.

=== End of the landgraviate ===
Hesse fought on the side of Coalition in the War of the First Coalition, against the First French Republic. In 1801, they would cede territories on the west bank of the Rhine to France. Following the reorganization of the German states during the German mediatisation of 1803, the Landgraviate of Hesse-Kassel gained land and was raised to the Electorate of Hesse and Landgrave William IX was elevated to Imperial Elector, taking the title William I, Elector of Hesse. The principality thus became known as Kurhessen (aka Kurfürstentum Hessen), although still usually referred to as Hesse-Kassel.

In 1806, William I was dispossessed by Napoleon Bonaparte for his support of the Kingdom of Prussia in the War of the Fourth Coalition. Kassel was designated as the capital of a new Kingdom of Westphalia, where Napoleon appointed his brother Jérôme Bonaparte as king. Following Napoleon's defeat in 1813, the elector was restored. At the Congress of Vienna, a number of Napoleonic electorates were elevated to kingdoms, and William tried to secure recognition as King of the Chatti. However, he was rebuffed by the Great Powers, who listed him as a "Royal Highness" along with the other grand dukes. To secure his pre-eminence over his cousin, the Grand Duke of Hesse in the former Hesse-Darmstadt, William chose to keep his title of Prince-Elector. The rulers of the Electorate of Hesse became the only Prince-Electors in the German Confederation, even though there was no longer a Holy Roman Emperor for them to elect.

== Hessian troops in foreign service ==
The Landgraves of Hesse-Kassel were famous for renting out their army to other European nations during the 17th and 18th centuries. It was a widespread practice at the time for small countries to rent out troops to larger countries in exchange for subsidies. International jurists drew a distinction between mercenaries and auxiliaries. Mercenaries served in foreign armies as individuals, while auxiliaries were sent by their ruler to the aid of another ruler.

Hesse-Kassel took the practice to an extreme, maintaining 5.3% to 7.3% of its population under arms in peacetime in its history, however was known to double that in times of war. This was a higher proportion than even Prussia, a country that was so heavily militarized that it was described as "not a country with an army, but an army with a country". The Hessian army served as a readily available reserve for other European nations. During the American Revolutionary War, the Kingdom of Great Britain rented thousands of German troops to fight in the Thirteen Colonies, half of whom came from Hesse-Kassel and nearby Hesse-Hanau. Due to this, American colonists in the colonies referred to all German troops serving with the British with the synecdoche "Hessian".

== Namesakes ==
The village of Hessen Cassel, Indiana, near Fort Wayne, founded by German immigrants, is named for the Landgraviate of Hesse-Kassel.

== See also ==
- New Netherland
- New Sweden
- Pennsylvania Dutch
- Rulers of Hesse

== Notes ==
| Preceded by House of Palatinate-Zweibrücken | Landgraves of Hesse-Kassel; 1567–1803 | Succeeded by House of Holstein-Gottorp |
