= William V of Hesse-Kassel =

William V
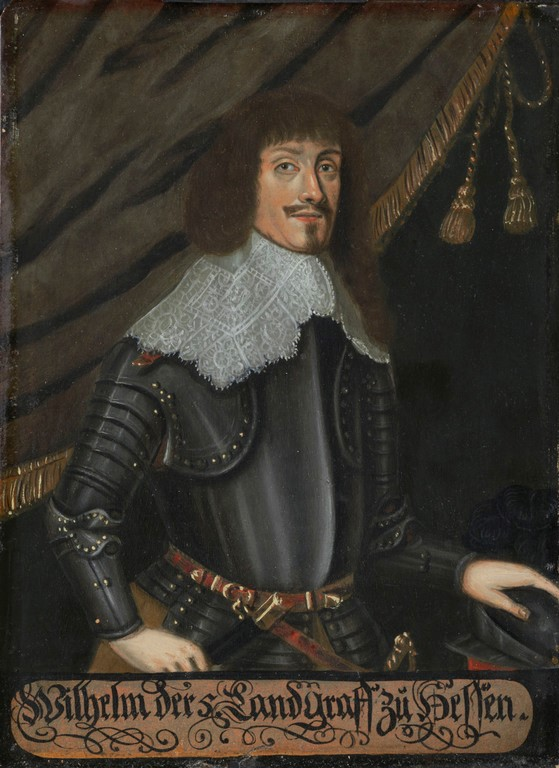
- 17th-century portrait

Landgrave of Hesse-Kassel
- Reign: 17 March 1627 – 21 September 1637
- Predecessor: Maurice
- Successor: William VI
- Born: 13 February 1602; Kassel, Hesse-Kassel
- Died: 21 September 1637 (aged 35); Leer, East Frisia
- Burial: Martinskirche, Kassel
- Spouse: Amalie Elisabeth von Hanau-Münzenberg (m. 1619)
- Issue: Agnes; Moritz; Elisabeth; Wilhelm; Princess Emilie of Hesse-Kassel; Charlotte, Electress Palatine; William VI, Landgrave of Hesse-Kassel; Philipp; Adolf; Karl; Susanna Elisabeth, Princess-Abbess of Herford; Luise
- House: Hesse-Kassel
- Father: Maurice, Landgrave of Hesse-Kassel
- Mother: Agnes of Solms-Laubach
- Religion: Calvinism

William V (German: Wilhelm) (13 February 1602 – 21 September 1637), a member of the House of Hesse, was Landgrave of Hesse-Kassel from 1627 to 1637. Having come to rule in unfavorable circumstances and in the midst of the Thirty Years' War, he continued to suffer losses of territory and wealth.

== Life ==
William was born in Kassel, the son of Landgrave Maurice of Hesse-Kassel and his consort Agnes of Solms-Laubach. His mother died shortly after his birth, and his father subsequently married Countess Juliane of Nassau-Siegen.

Maurice, of broad education and interests, inherited half of the estates held by the extinct landgraves of Hesse-Marburg in 1604. However, when he converted to Calvinism the next year, he entered into a protracted legal dispute with his Lutheran cousin Landgrave Louis V of Hesse-Darmstadt. The Aulic Council decided in favour of Louis, and on 17 March 1627, after losing much of the territory to the Darmstadt line and leaving the family in financial ruin, Maurice finally abdicated in favor of his son.

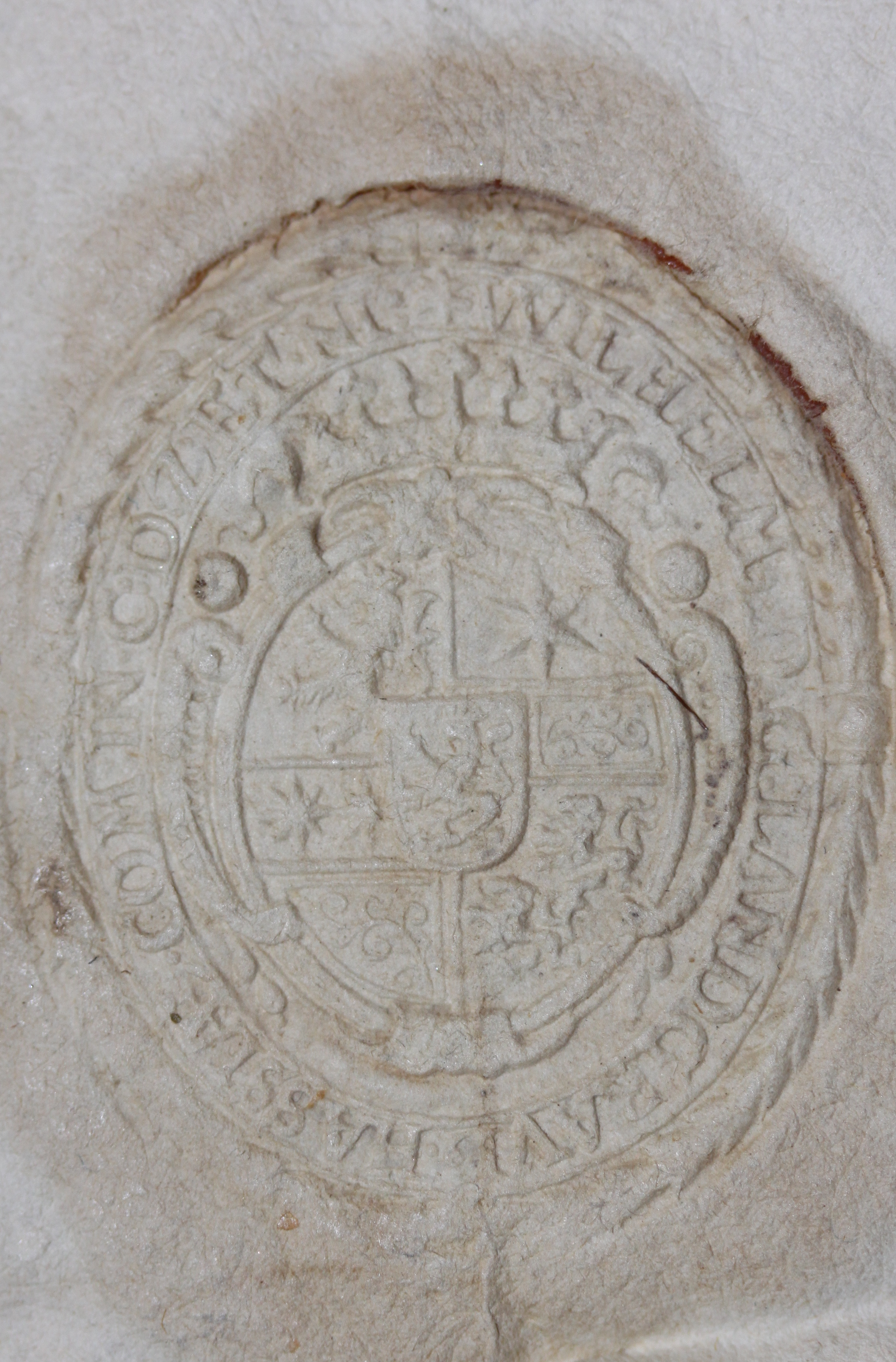
Seal of Landgrave William V

William's first order was to obey the verdict and to stabilise the economic situation of the landgraviate. He fought against the Kipper und Wipper debasement crisis and aimed at reducing the debt burden. In the Thirty Years' War, he allied with his relative King Gustavus Adolphus of Sweden, whose army disembarked on 6 July 1630 in Pomerania.

As a commander, he drove out the Imperial troops under Aldringen and Fugger from Hesse. After the Protestant victory at the 1631 Battle of Breitenfeld, King Gustavus Adolphus ceded William the abbeys of Abbey, Hersfeld and Corvey as well as the prince-bishoprics of Paderborn and Münster.

William occupied Hersfeld and the Mainz estate of Fritzlar; however, when he and Gustavus Adolphus entered the city of Frankfurt, his cousin Landgrave George II of Hesse-Darmstadt, allied with Emperor Ferdinand II, was alarmed and started negotiations with the Swedish king. William's expectations proved to be false, when Gustavus Adolphus only seized the Rüsselsheim fortress and left Upper Hesse to Landgrave Georg. William's situation worsened when the king was killed in the 1632 Battle of Lützen.

When in 1635 the emperor concluded the Peace of Prague with numerous Protestant princes, William was left offside. Instead he forged a military alliance with France, which earned him the invasion of Imperial troops. The landgrave again lost Fulda and his Westphalian conquests and plunged into another debt crisis. He was declared an "enemy of the Empire" while his cousin Georg was appointed administrator of the Hesse-Kassel estates.

In 1636 the forces of William and the Swedish commander Alexander Leslie were able to liberate the besieged fortress of Hanau. Nevertheless, by 1637 whole Hesse-Kassel was under military occupation and William was forced to escape. He died in exile in East Frisia.

William's widow, Amalie Elisabeth von Hanau-Münzenberg, served as regent for her son William VI, Landgrave of Hesse-Kassel until he came of age in 1650. Under her leadership many of the lands lost by her father-in-law and husband were regained through various foreign alliances and battles. In 1650, William's son, William VI, began his rule as Landgrave, and continued the Hesse-Kassel line, which almost perished under Maurice and William V.

One of his daughters, Charlotte, married Charles I Louis, Elector Palatine and was the mother of the famous Duchess of Orléans, sister in law of Louis XIV. Another daughter, Emily, married Henri Charles de La Trémoille.

== Issue ==
- Agnes (24 November 1620 – 20 August 1626).
- Maurice (born and died 24 September 1621).
- Elisabeth (21 October 1623 – 13 January 1624).
- William (31 January 1625 – 11 July 1626).
- Emilie (11 February 1626 – 15 February 1693), married 15 May 1648 to Henri Charles de La Trémoille.
- Charlotte (20 November 1627 – 16 March 1686), married 12 February 1650 (div. 14 April 1657) to Charles I Louis of the Palatinate.
- William VI, Landgrave of Hesse-Kassel (23 May 1629 – 16 July 1663), married 9 July 1646 to Margravine Hedwig Sophie of Brandenburg.
- Philipp (16 June 1630 – 17 August 1638).
- Adolf (17 December 1631 – 17 March 1632).
- Karl (18/19 June 1633 – 9 March 1635).
- Elisabeth (23 June 1634 – 22 March 1688), Princess-Abbess of Herford.
- Stillbirth (8 February 1635).
- Luise (5 November 1636 – 6 January 1638).
- Stillbirth (28 May 1637).

== Ancestry ==
Ancestors of William V of Hesse-Kassel

8. Philip I, Landgrave of Hesse
4. William IV, Landgrave of Hesse-Kassel
9. Christine of Saxony
2. Maurice, Landgrave of Hesse-Kassel
10. Christoph, Duke of Württemberg
5. Sabine of Württemberg
11. Anna Maria of Brandenburg-Ansbach
1. William V, Landgrave of Hesse-Kassel
12. Frederick Magnus I, Count of Solms-Laubach
6. John George, Count of Solms-Laubach
13. Agnes of Wied
3. Agnes of Solms-Laubach
14. George II of Schönburg-Glauchau
7. Margaret of Schönburg-Glauchau
15. Dorothea of Reuss-Plauen

William V of Hesse-Kassel House of Hesse Born: 13 February 1602 Died: 21 September 1637
Regnal titles
Preceded by Maurice	Landgrave of Hesse-Kassel; 1627-1637	Succeeded by William VI
