= Elizabeth Charlotte of the Palatinate, Electress of Brandenburg =

Electress of Brandenburg and Duchess of Prussia

Elizabeth Charlotte of the Palatinate
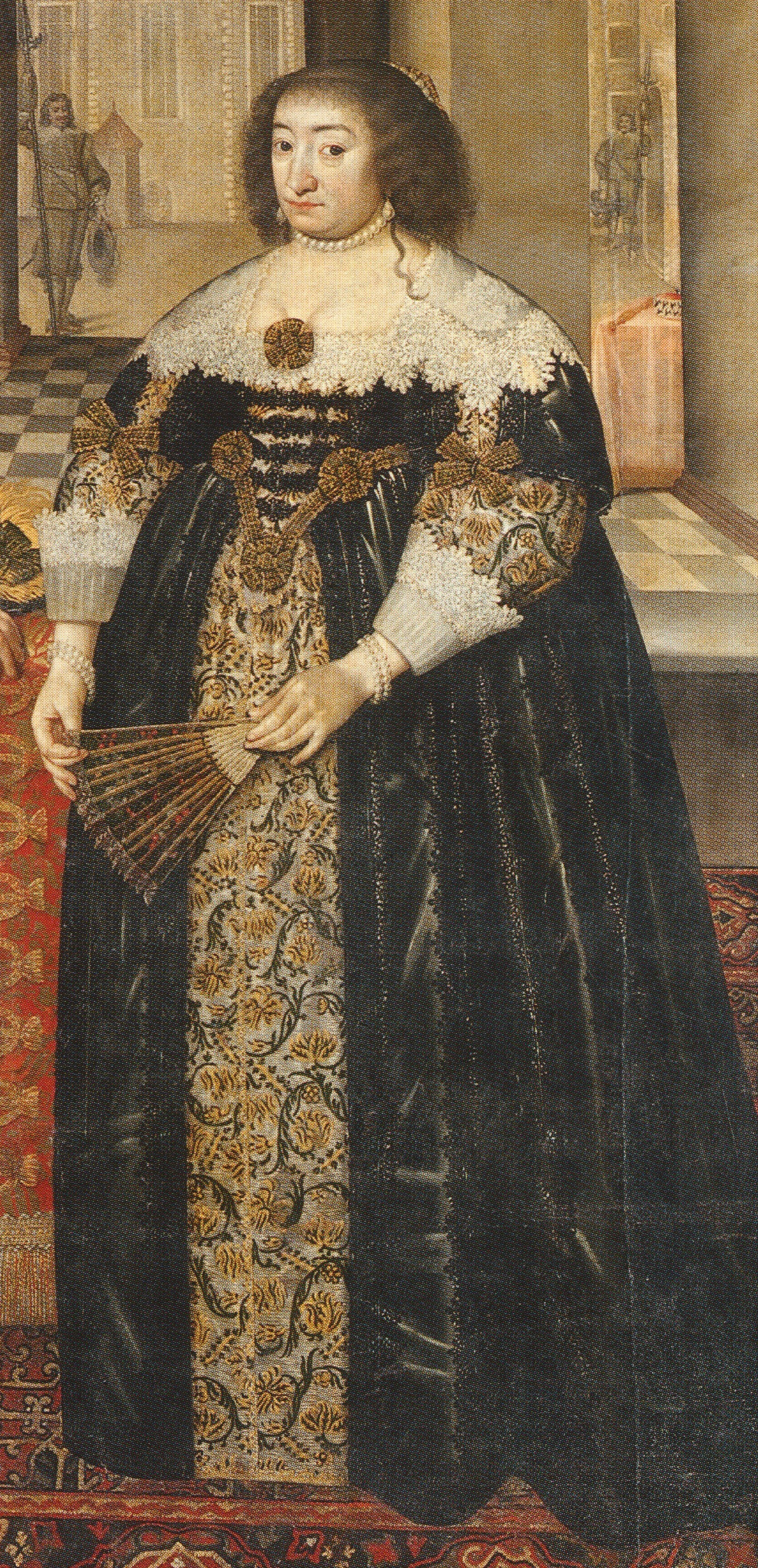
- Elizabeth Charlotte of the Palatinate (1597–1660) by their court painter Mathias Czwiczek

Electress consort of Brandenburg Duchess consort of Prussia
- Tenure: 23 December 1619 – 1 December 1640
- Born: 19 November 1597; Neumarkt in der Oberpfalz
- Died: 26 April 1660 (aged 62); Crossen an der Oder
- Spouse: George William, Elector of Brandenburg (m. 1616; died 1640)
- Issue: Louise Charlotte, Duchess of Courland; Frederick William, Elector of Brandenburg; Hedwig Sophia, Landgravine of Hesse-Kassel
- House: Wittelsbach
- Father: Frederick IV, Elector Palatine
- Mother: Louise Juliana of Orange-Nassau

Elizabeth Charlotte of the Palatinate (19 November 1597 – 26 April 1660) was an Electress consort of Brandenburg as the wife of George William, Elector of Brandenburg and Duke of Prussia, and the mother of Frederick William of Brandenburg, the "Great Elector".

== Biography ==
Elizabeth Charlotte was the daughter of Frederick IV, Elector Palatine, and Louise Juliana of Orange-Nassau. Her brother Frederick became famous as the Elector-Palatine and "Winter King" of Bohemia.

In 1616 Elizabeth Charlotte married George William, with whom she had three children.

The marriage was arranged to unite two Protestant dynasties. In 1618, her brother's deposition from the throne of Bohemia caused the Thirty Years' War. Her spouse was described as ambivalent and passive, but Charlotte ensured protection for her sibling when Brandenburg sided against Austria in the affairs of Bohemia and the Holy Roman Empire. At court, she favoured the Protestant party against the pro-Austrian party. She influenced her son to sympathize with the Protestant cause, and he came to have a great affection for his mother, closer than what was usually common during that age. She spent her last years at Crossen, where she died.

== Issue ==
- Louise Charlotte (1617–1676), married Jacob Kettler, Duke of Courland
- Frederick William (1620–1688), the "Great Elector"
- Hedwig Sophia (1623–1683), married William VI, Landgrave of Hesse-Kassel (or Hesse-Cassel)

== Ancestry ==
Ancestors of Elizabeth Charlotte of the Palatinate, Electress of Brandenburg

16. John II, Count Palatine of Simmern
8. Frederick III, Elector Palatine
17. Beatrix of Baden
4. Louis VI, Elector Palatine
18. Casimir, Margrave of Brandenburg-Bayreuth
9. Marie of Brandenburg-Kulmbach
19. Susanna of Bavaria
2. Frederick IV, Elector Palatine
20. William II, Landgrave of Hesse
10. Philip I, Landgrave of Hesse
21. Anna of Mecklenburg-Schwerin
5. Elisabeth of Hesse
22. George, Duke of Saxony
11. Christine of Saxony
23. Barbara Jagiellon
1. Elizabeth Charlotte of the Palatinate
24. John V, Count of Nassau-Siegen
12. William I, Count of Nassau-Siegen
25. Elisabeth of Hesse-Marburg
6. Prince William I of Orange
26. Bodo III, Count of Stolberg-Wernigerode
13. Juliana of Stolberg-Wernigerode
27. Anna of Eppstein-Königstein
3. Louise Juliana of Nassau
28. Louis of Bourbon, Prince of La Roche-sur-Yon
14. Louis III de Bourbon, Duke of Montpensier
29. Louise de Bourbon, Duchess of Montpensier
7. Charlotte de Bourbon-Montpensier
30. Jean IV de Longwy, Seigneur de Givry-Bar
15. Jacqueline de Longwy
31. Jeanne of Angouleme

Elizabeth Charlotte of the Palatinate, Electress of Brandenburg House of Palatinate-Simmern Born: 19 November 1597 Died: 26 April 1660
German nobility
Preceded by Anna of Prussia	Electress consort of Brandenburg; 23 December 1619 – 1 December 1640	Vacant Title next held by Louise Henriette of Orange
Preceded by Anna of Prussia	Duchess consort of Prussia; 23 December 1619 – 1 December 1640	Vacant Title next held by Louise Henriette of Orange
