= George William, Elector of Brandenburg =

Elector of Brandenburg from 1619 to 1640

George William
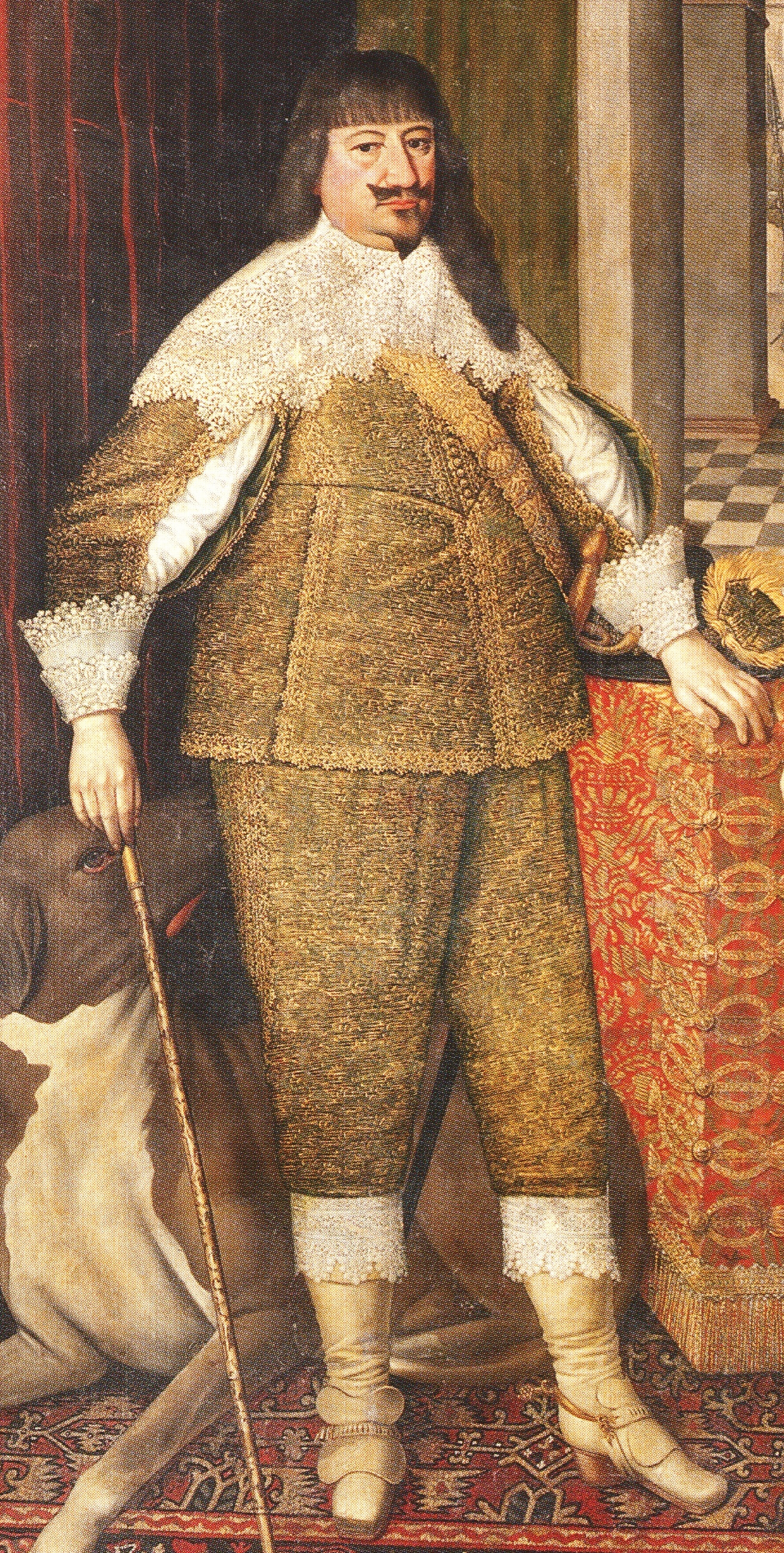
- Portrait c. 1635

Elector of Brandenburg Duke of Prussia
- Reign: 23 December 1619 – 1 December 1640
- Predecessor: John Sigismund
- Successor: Frederick William
- Born: 13 November 1595; Berlin, Electorate of Brandenburg, Holy Roman Empire
- Died: 1 December 1640 (aged 45); Königsberg, Duchy of Prussia
- Burial: Königsberg Cathedral
- Spouse: Elizabeth Charlotte of the Palatinate (m. 1616)
- Issue: Louise Charlotte, Duchess of Courland; Frederick William, Elector of Brandenburg; Hedwig Sophia, Landgravine of Hesse-Kassel
- House: Hohenzollern
- Father: John Sigismund, Margrave of Brandenburg
- Mother: Anna of Prussia

George William (German: Georg Wilhelm; 13 November 1595 – 1 December 1640), of the Hohenzollern dynasty, was Margrave and Elector of Brandenburg and Duke of Prussia from 1619 until his death. His reign was marked by ineffective governance during the Thirty Years' War. He was the father of Frederick William, the "Great Elector".

== Biography ==
Born in Cölln on the Spree (today part of Berlin), George William was the son of John Sigismund, Elector of Brandenburg, and Anna of Prussia. His maternal grandfather was Albert Frederick, Duke of Prussia. In 1616, he married Elisabeth Charlotte of the Palatinate. Their only son Frederick William would later be known as the "Great Elector". Of his two daughters, the eldest, Louise Charlotte, married Jacob Kettler, Duke of Courland, and the younger, Hedwig Sophie, married William VI, Landgrave of Hesse-Kassel.

In 1619, George William inherited the Margravate of Brandenburg and the Duchy of Prussia, then a vassal of the Polish–Lithuanian Commonwealth, although his ownership was not confirmed by Sigismund III Vasa until September 1621. He proved a weak and ineffective ruler in a very difficult period of history; possession of Prussia involved him in the 1621 to 1625 Polish–Swedish War, since Gustavus Adolphus of Sweden was married to his sister Maria Eleonora.

During the Thirty Years' War, the Calvinist George William tried to remain neutral in the contest between the Catholic Emperor Ferdinand II, and his mostly Lutheran opponents. When the war shifted to northern Germany in 1625, this did not protect his lands from being looted by Imperial troops, and he was forced to take sides when Gustavus intervened in the Empire in 1630. However, this simply replaced one set of plunderers with another; Gustavus could not support so large an army, and his unpaid and unfed troops became increasingly mutinous and ill-disciplined.

After Gustavus was killed at Lützen in November 1632, George William joined the Swedish-backed Heilbronn League, until defeat at Nördlingen on 6 September 1634. Following the 1635 Peace of Prague, the League was dissolved, although by now Brandenburg's population had been decimated by the war.

Leaving his Catholic and pro-Imperial chief minister Schwarzenberg to run the government, George William withdrew in 1637 to the relatively untouched region of Prussia, where he lived in retirement until his death at Königsberg in 1640. He was succeeded by his far more accomplished son Frederick William.

== Ancestry ==
Ancestors of George William, Elector of Brandenburg

8. John George, Elector of Brandenburg
4. Joachim Frederick, Elector of Brandenburg
9. Sophie of Legnica
2. John Sigismund, Elector of Brandenburg
10. John, Margrave of Brandenburg-Küstrin
5. Catherine of Brandenburg-Küstrin
11. Catherine of Brunswick-Wolfenbüttel
1. George William, Elector of Brandenburg
12. Albert, Duke of Prussia
6. Albert Frederick, Duke of Prussia
13. Anna Maria of Brunswick-Calenberg-Göttingen
3. Duchess Anna of Prussia
14. William, Duke of Jülich-Cleves-Berg
7. Marie Eleonore of Cleves
15. Archduchess Maria of Austria

== Sources ==
- Clark, C (2008). Iron Kingdom: The Rise and Downfall of Prussia, 1600-1947. Harvard University Press. ISBN 978-0674023857.
- Johnson, Christopher H; Sabean, David Warren (2011). Sibling Relations and the Transformations of European Kinship, 1300-1900. Berghahn Books. ISBN 978-0857450463.
- O'Connell, Daniel Patrick (1968). Richelieu. Weidenfeld & Nicolson.
- Wedgwood, CV (1938). The Thirty Years War (2005 ed.). New York Review of Books. ISBN 978-1590171462.
- Wilson, Peter H. (2009). Europe's Tragedy: A History of the Thirty Years War. Allen Lane. ISBN 978-0-7139-9592-3.

George William, Elector of Brandenburg House of Hohenzollern Born: 13 November 1595 Died: 1 December 1640[aged 45]
Regnal titles
Preceded by John Sigismund	Elector of Brandenburg; Duke of Prussia; 1619–1640	Succeeded by Frederick William
