= Otto, Hereditary Prince of Hesse-Kassel =

Administrator of Hersfeld Abbey (1594–1617)

Prince Otto of Hesse-Kassel
- hereditary Prince of Hesse-Kassel
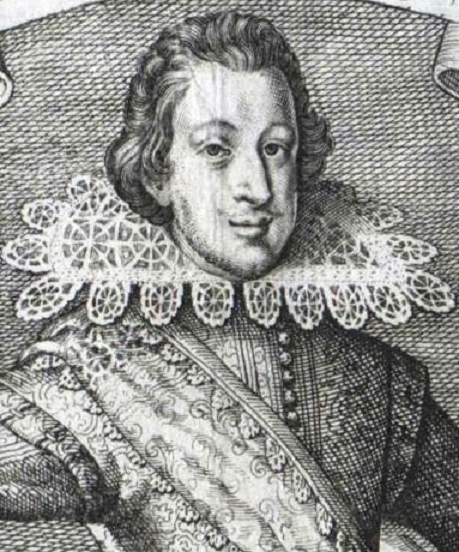
- Born: 24 December 1594; Kassel
- Died: 7 August 1617 (aged 22); Hersfeld
- Buried: St. Mary's church in Marburg
- Noble family: House of Hesse
- Spouses: Catherine Ursula of Baden-Durlach (m. 1613; died 1615) Agnes Magdalene of Anhalt-Dessau (m. 1617)
- Issue: Ernest Reinhard of Hattenbach (illegitimate)
- Father: Maurice, Landgrave of Hesse-Kassel
- Mother: Agnes of Solms-Laubach

Hereditary Prince Otto of Hesse-Kassel (24 December 1594 in Kassel – 7 August 1617 in Hersfeld), was hereditary prince of Hesse-Kassel and administrator of Hersfeld Abbey. He predeceased his father and never reigned.

== Life ==
Otto was the eldest son of Landgrave Maurice of Hesse-Kassel (1572-1632) from his marriage to Agnes (1578-1602), the daughter of Count John George of Solms-Laubach (1546–1600) and his wife, Margaret of Schönburg-Glauchau (1554–1606). Poet Hermann Kirchner, later professor of rhetoric at the University of Marburg, wrote a poem to mark Otto's birthday. The Ottoneum, built in Kassel by Maurice in 1603, was the first theater building constructed in Germany. Maurice named it after his son.

Otto and his siblings were educated by his father. In 1606 he became the lay administrator of Hersfeld Abbey, which by then was a Lutheran institution. After completing his studies at the University of Marburg, Otto made a Grand Tour. He was in England from 23 June to 7 August 1611, with a retinue of about thirty, and was among the potential suitors of Princess Elizabeth. (She later married Otto's second cousin Frederick V of the Palatinate.) As Otto's father was known as a skilled composer, music played a large part of the entertainment. John Milton, the poet's father, composed a song in four parts, for which the landgrave presented him with a gold medal.

When he returned, his father involved him in the business of government.

In 1617, he suffered from the German measles. He had a fever and from his sickbed, he tried to shoot a barking dog, which annoyed him. He missed so badly that he hit himself in the chest and died. He was buried in the Lutheran St. Mary's church in Marburg.

== Marriages and issue ==
In Kassel on 24 August 1613 Otto married firstly princess Catherine Ursula of Baden-Durlach (b. Schloss Karlsburg, 19 June 1593 - d. Marburg, 15 February 1615), daughter of George Frederick, Margrave of Baden-Durlach. She died after giving birth a still-born son.

In Dessau on 14 June 1617 Otto married secondly Princess Agnes Magdalene of Anhalt-Dessau (b. Dessau, 29 March 1590 - d. Eschwege, 24 October 1626), daughter of John George I, Prince of Anhalt-Dessau. This marriage was childless.

Otto left a son born out of wedlock with an unknown woman:

- Ernest Reinhard von Hattenbach (b. posthumously Hachborn, 17 December 1617 - d. Rodenberg, 1 April 1694), married in 1669 lady in waiting to Landgravine Hedwig Sophie, Anna Katharina von Hake (1650-1707), daughter of Daniel von Hake zu Klein-Machnow (1582-1648) and his second wife, Brigitte von der Gröben. They had issue

== Ancestors ==
Ancestors of Otto, Hereditary Prince of Hesse-Kassel

16. William II, Landgrave of Hesse
8. Philip I, Landgrave of Hesse
17. Anna of Mecklenburg-Schwerin
4. William IV, Landgrave of Hesse-Kassel
18. George, Duke of Saxony
9. Christine of Saxony
19. Barbara Jagiellon
2. Maurice, Landgrave of Hesse-Kassel
20. Ulrich, Duke of Württemberg
10. Christoph, Duke of Württemberg
21. Sabina of Bavaria
5. Sabine of Württemberg
22. George, Margrave of Brandenburg-Ansbach
11. Anna Maria of Brandenburg-Ansbach
23. Hedwig of Münsterberg-Oels
1. Otto, Hereditary Prince of Hesse-Kassel
24. Otto of Solms-Laubach
12. Frederick Magnus I, Count of Solms-Laubach
25. Anna of Mecklenburg-Schwerin (= 17)
6. John George, Count of Solms-Laubach
26. John III of Wied-Runkel
13. Agnes of Wied
27. Elisabeth of Nassau-Siegen
3. Agnes of Solms-Laubach
28. George II, Baron of Schönburg-Glauchau
14. George II, Baron of Schönburg-Glauchau
29. Amalia of Leisnig
7. Margaret of Schönburg-Glauchau
30. Henry XIII of Reuss-Greiz
15. Dorothea of Reuss-Plauen
31. Amalia of Mansfeld-Vorderort
