= Elizabeth of Hesse-Kassel, Duchess of Mecklenburg =

Elizabeth
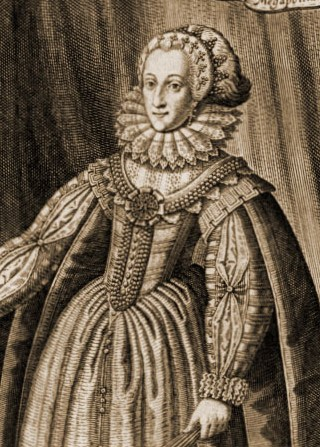

Duchess of Mecklenburg-Güstrow
- Tenure: 25 March 1618 – 16 December 1625
- Born: 24 March 1596; Kassel
- Died: 16 December 1625 (aged 29); Güstrow
- Spouse: John Albert II, Duke of Mecklenburg (m. 1618)
- House: Hesse
- Father: Maurice, Landgrave of Hesse-Kassel
- Mother: Agnes of Solms-Laubach

Elizabeth of Hesse-Kassel (24 March 1596 in Kassel – 16 December 1625 in Güstrow) was a princess of Hesse-Kassel, by marriage Duchess of Mecklenburg, and a poet of the German and Italian language.

== Life ==
Elizabeth was the eldest daughter of Landgrave Maurice of Hesse-Kassel from his marriage to Agnes, a daughter Count John George of Solms-Laubach. Her godmother was Queen Elizabeth I of England, who was represented on this occasion by the Earl of Lincoln. The christening of the Princess was one of the most elaborate ceremonies at the court in Kassel, including "four days of lavish games, tournaments, and fireworks". The last knight games in Europe were held on this occasion. The engraver and historian Wilhelm Dilich made a documentary about the event in 1598-1601. That volume is now in the City of Kassel Museum. A second manuscript about the celebrations, "compiled and executed by an unknown hand", is held by the Bavarian State Library.

Her father educated her and her brothers at the court school. Elizabeth was described as very witty. She was fluent in several languages and has authored more than 200 poems. She played and composed music and also translated texts into German and Italian.

Her father wanted to marry her to Charles Philip, Duke of Södermanland, but she refused. She was then engaged to Frederick Henry, Prince of Orange. However, he broke off the engagement when he could not meet the considerable demands for her dowry.

Elizabeth married on 25 March 1618 in Kassel, to Duke John Albert II of Mecklenburg-Güstrow, who already had four children from his first marriage. The Duchess, who was very musical, created the Court Orchestra at Güstrow and was also active as an author.

Elizabeth had no children from her marriage and on her death, her dowry, the city of Dargun, fell back to Hesse.

== Ancestors ==
Ancestors of Elizabeth of Hesse-Kassel, Duchess of Mecklenburg

16. William II, Landgrave of Hesse
8. Philip I, Landgrave of Hesse
17. Anna of Mecklenburg-Schwerin
4. William IV, Landgrave of Hesse-Kassel
18. George, Duke of Saxony
9. Christine of Saxony
19. Barbara Jagiellon
2. Maurice, Landgrave of Hesse-Kassel
20. Ulrich, Duke of Württemberg
10. Christoph, Duke of Württemberg
21. Sabina of Bavaria
5. Sabine of Württemberg
22. George, Margrave of Brandenburg-Ansbach
11. Anna Maria of Brandenburg-Ansbach
23. Hedwig of Münsterberg-Oels
1. Elizabeth of Hesse-Kassel
24. Otto of Solms-Laubach
12. Frederick Magnus I, Count of Solms-Laubach
25. Anna of Mecklenburg-Schwerin (= 17)
6. John George, Count of Solms-Laubach
26. John III of Wied-Runkel
13. Agnes of Wied
27. Elisabeth of Nassau-Siegen
3. Agnes of Solms-Laubach
28. George II, Baron of Schönburg-Glauchau
14. George II, Baron of Schönburg-Glauchau
29. Amalia of Leisnig
7. Margaret of Schönburg-Glauchau
30. Henry XIII of Reuss-Greiz
15. Dorothea of Reuss-Plauen
31. Amalia of Mansfeld-Vorderort

== Sources ==
- Gustav Könnecke (1877). "Elisabeth, Landgräfin von Hessen-Kassel" . Allgemeine Deutsche Biographie (in German). Vol. 6. Leipzig: Duncker & Humblot. p. 18.
- Christoph von Rommel: Geschichte von Hessen, vol. 2, Kassel, 1837, p. 349 ff. (Online)
