= Wilhelm Dilich =

German master builder, engineer, engraver

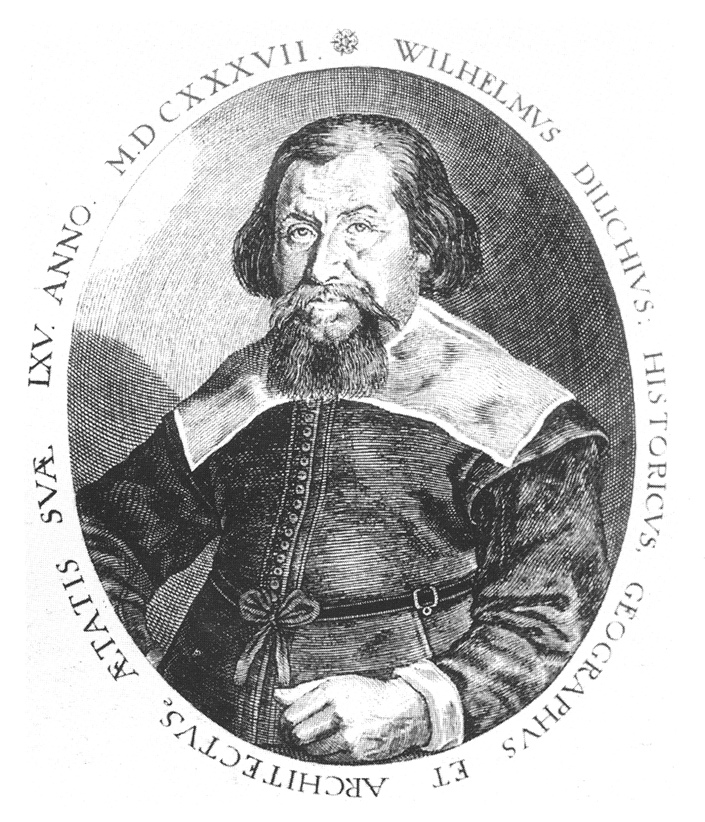
- Portrait by Sebastian Furck, 1637
- Born: Wilhelm Scheffer; 1571; Wabern, Hesse
- Died: April 4, 1650 (aged 78–79); Dresden, Electorate of Saxony
- Education: Marburg University
- Employer(s): Maurice, Landgrave of Hesse-Kassel (1591-1624); John George I, Elector of Saxony (1624-1650)
- Known for: Dilich Chronicle
- Children: Johann Wilhelm Dilich

Wilhelm Dilich, also known as Dilich-Schäffer, born Wilhelm Scheffer or Schöffer (1571, Wabern – April 4, 1650, Dresden), was a German master builder, engineer, woodcutter, copper engraver, draftsman, topographer, and military writer. He described himself as a "Geographer and Historian."

== Early life and education ==
Dilich was the son of Pastor Heinrich Scheffer (also Schaeffer, called Dilich or Diichius; died 1615) from Wabern near Kassel. He attended the scholars' school in Kassel and studied at the University of Wittenberg from 1589 to 1590 and at the Philipps University of Marburg until 1591. Inspired by his Wittenberg studies of Electoral Saxon chronicles and topographies as well as relevant Saxon copper engravings and woodcut publications, he soon began to travel throughout Hesse as a chronicler and view draftsman. He then combined the historical and geographical notes thus collected with a series of hand-drawn pen sketches of Hessian cities, etc., into a handwritten "Synopsis descriptionis totius Hassiae tribus libris comprehensae" (published in print in 1901 in Marburg), the presentation of which to Maurice, Landgrave of Hesse-Kassel earned him a position as "draftsman" in the Landgrave's service in 1592.

== Career ==
=== In Hesse ===
Same year, after further presentation of a small treatise "De Electoribus Saxonicis" compiled in Wittenberg in 1590, he was granted leave by Landgrave to pursue further, likely artistic technical studies in Saxony. In the summer of 1594, he completed in Leipzig "Brevis Lipsiae descriptio," which he sent again to his Hessian sovereign with a request for an extension of his leave. At the urgent order of the Landgrave, he soon returned to Kassel and married there in 1594 to Anna Stubenrauch, a daughter of the wealthy burgrave of Sababurg. However, as early as 1596, he secured a new travel leave to Hamburg where lived for a year. He visited Bremen and drew a complete view of both Hanseatic cities on this journey, which he presented to their city councils; he used various other Bremen city views (dated 1596 and 1597) for the copper engraving illustrations of his Bremen Chronicle, also known as Dilich Chronicle in booklet format. However, the booklet was objected to, especially the text. The definitive work was published in 1603/04. It had twice the format and bore the title "Urbis Bremae et praefecturarum, quas habet, Typus et Chronicon." The text was provided by Bremen councilor and later mayor Heinrich Krefting. Copies in Latin from several editions have been preserved. The book contains 22 etched maps and views, at least one based on drawings by Christian von Apen. The first editions contain numerous additional plates with portraits and costumes. Dilich worked with the Bremen-born publisher Wilhelm Wessel in Kassel, who also published other of his illustrated works.

From 1597 to 1622, Dilich was again in the service of the Hessian Landgrave. Having returned to Kassel again from his first Bremen journey in 1597, he completed in the summer of 1598 a "Historical Description of the Princely Christening of Miss Elisabeth of Hesse", commissioned by Landgrave and illustrated with numerous hand-engraved depictions of the customary "knights' games," which he republished in 1601 in his own publishing house together with a similarly equipped description of the christening of Maurice of Hesse from the year 1600. He was present when, Hossein Ali Beg Bayat and Anthony Shirley, Safavid ambassadors sent by Abbas the Great arrived in the Hessian court same year.

Meanwhile, he had also compiled a popular "Hungarian Chronicle" from older and newer writings and had it printed in 1600 by Wessel in Kassel with numerous city views, costume images, and maps, partly engraved in copper, partly cut in wood after foreign templates (republished several times by the latter, e.g., in 1606 with "a new description and truthful sketch of the present city of Constantinople"). He further executed the numerous woodcut illustrations (the "Paradise" signed "W. D.") and map engravings for Schönfeld's Kassel Bible edition of 1601.

Also in the summer of 1605, he was able to publish his "Hessian Chronicle" written at the express commission of Landgrave, with its countless copper engraving plates (views of cities and castles, costume images, princely portraits, and maps) and woodcut coats of arms in his own publishing house (republished several times until 1617). Often, his city views are the oldest verifiable historical and accurate pictorial representations. In 1607, he followed this with his first military technical work, a "War Book, in which the Old and New Military is properly described" (conceived on previous journeys to the Netherlands on behalf of Landgrave and illustrated with copper engraving depictions of fortification, camp, and artillery matters).

Finally, from September 1, 1607, entrusted by Landgrave with a comprehensive cartographic survey of the entire Hessian territory, he fell into disfavor with his sovereign due to insurmountable difficulties that stood in the way of completing this work (only 19 maps and 32 plates with floor plans, cross-sections, and exterior views of Hessian castles were completed; the historically invaluable castle views—fold-out images with exterior and interior representations of many castle complexes destroyed in the Thirty Years' War). Between 1607 and 1622, he worked on the land maps of Hessian offices between the Rhine and Weser (now in the University Library of Kassel), which, however, remained unfinished. The scale of the surveys ranges from maps to architectural surveys of individual castles such as the water fortress Ziegenhain, the Marksburg, or Rheinfels above St. Goar.

After exceeding his authority in directing fortification works in Wanfried in 1622 and being sentenced to a fine of 1,000 thalers, he even had to languish in prison for years until William V, Landgrave of Hesse-Kassel, enabled his escape amidst the turmoil of war, and his countryman Johann Melchior von Schwalbach facilitated his transfer to Electoral Saxon service in March 1625. As a result, his last Hessian chronicler work also remained unfinished: a work on "Urbs et Academia Marpurgensis," probably begun before 1605 and presumably intended for publication at the Marburg University jubilee of 1627.

=== In Saxony ===
To his Latin application letter to John George I, Elector of Saxony, dated March 11, 1624, Dilich had attached an allegorical representation "Peribologia" in pen drawing and copper engraving reproduction as artistic proof of his talents. Through the electoral appointment letter of March 27, 1625, he was accordingly taken into official duty not only as a military engineer and cartographer but also as an architect and artistic view draftsman for an annual salary of 400 thalers (plus free housing, travel allowances, and various extra income).

His first work in Dresden was purely artistic in nature: Through the mediation of his countryman and patron Johann Melchior von Schwalbach, he received in the summer of 1625 the commission to rebuild the so-called Giants' Hall in Dresden Castle which had previously been flat-roofed, with the help of a modern segmental arch vault construction. He was also to provide the overall planning for the pictorial decoration of ceiling vault, completed according to his designs in 1627, and the detailed drawing templates for the approximately 40 Saxon city images of the vault fields on both long sides of the "Giants' Hall."

Under Dilich's supervision and based on his designs, court painter Kilian Fabritius worked on these vault paintings from 1627 to 1631, and after his death, court painter Christian Schiebling from 1638 to 1650. By January 1650, they were completed to the "most gracious pleasure" of the Saxon Elector. The Giants' Hall was destroyed in a castle fire in 1701 and later divided into several individual rooms. These latter Saxon view works of Dilich were created in the short period from spring 1626 to summer 1629.

During these three years, however, Dilich was continuously traveling not only for these city surveys but also as a fortress architect; for example, he worked as such in spring 1626 with von Schwalbach in Wittenberg, in spring 1627 with his son Johann Wilhelm Dilich in Frankfurt am Main, as well as on the fortifications of Torgau, Dresden and of Leipzig.

As a theoretician of warfare and fortification, finally, in 1647, he completed the revision of his "War Book" promised in the first edition of 1607 (only printed in 1689 in Frankfurt am Main, reprinted in 1718). Only in early 1650, a few months before his death, he retired from his service. Often, the pen drawings by him served as templates for works by Matthäus Merian the Elder. He owned a good library with geographical, historical, and technical works.

He died on April 4, 1650 in Dresden.

== Family ==
He was married to Anna Stubenrauch, a daughter of the wealthy burgrave of Sababurg in 1594. Together they had at least 14 children - Johann Wilhelm Dilich, a fortress architect born in Kassel, 1600 being the most famous one. In addition to Johann Wilhelm Dilich, Wilhelm Dilich also trained two children as military engineers: the elder Johann Dilich (1597–1667) and Crato Dilich (1611–1639).

== Works ==
- De Electoribus Saxonicis (On the Electors of Saxony), 1590
- Synopsis descriptionis totius Hassiae tribus libris comprehensae (Synopsis Description of All Hesse Comprised in Three Books), 1591
- Brevis Lipsiae descriptio (Brief Description of Leipzig), 1594
- Beschreibung und Abriss dero Ritterspiel, so der Durchleuchtige Herr Moritz. Landgraf zu Hessen… auff die fürstliche Kindtauffen Frewlein Elisabethen…am fürstlichen Hoff zu Cassel angeordnet, gefeiert im August 1596 zu Cassel. (Description and Outline of the Knights' Tournament, as the Illustrious Lord Moritz, Landgrave of Hesse... ordered at the princely court of Kassel for the princely baptism of Lady Elisabeth... celebrated in August 1596 in Kassel), 1601
- Biblia (Bible), 1601
- Ungarische Chronik (Hungarian Chronicle), 1601
- Bremen Dilich-Chronicle:
  - Preliminary edition: Urbis Bremae typus et chronicon (Type and Chronicle of the City of Bremen), 1602
  - City-authorized edition: Urbis Bremae et Praefectuarũ quas habet typus et chronicon (Type and Chronicle of the City of Bremen and Its Prefectures), 1603 ff.
- Hessische Chronica (Hessian Chronicle), 1605
- Eigendtliche, kurtze Beschreibung und Abriss dero weitt berühmten Keyserlichen Stadt Constantinobel (Genuine, Brief Description and Outline of the Far-Famed Imperial City of Constantinople), 1606
- Kurtze Beschreibung und eigentliche Abrisse dero Länder und Festungen, so der Türcke biss dahero in Europa, besonders aber in Ungarn, Slavonia, Dacia, Dalmatia und Griechenlandt zum theil mit krieg angefochten, zum theil aber gantz under sein Joch bracht, sanpt der Ungarischen Chronica (Brief Description and Authentic Outlines of the Lands and Fortresses that the Turks Have Thus Far in Europe, Especially in Hungary, Slavonia, Dacia, Dalmatia, and Greece, Partly Attacked with War, Partly Brought Entirely Under Their Yoke, Together with the Hungarian Chronicle), 1609
- Hessische Chronica (Hessian Chronicle), 1617
- Landtafeln hessischer Ämter zwischen Rhein und Weser (Land Maps of Hessian Offices Between Rhine and Weser), 1607/1622
- Urbs et Academia Marpurgensis succincte descripta (The City and University of Marburg Succinctly Described), 1627
- Peribologia oder Wilhelm Dilichii Hist. von Vestungsgebewen. Vieler Örter vermehrett … und publicirett durch Wilhelm Dilichium (Peribology or Wilhelm Dilich's History of Fortress Buildings, Expanded in Many Places and Published by Wilhelm Dilich), 1640
- Kurtzer Underricht Bollwerke anzulegen (Brief Instructions for Building Bulwarks), 1645
- Wilhelmi Dilichii… Hochvernünfftig gegründet- und aufgerichtete, in gewisse Classen eingetheilte, bisher verschlossen gelegen, nunmehr aber eröffnete Kriegs-Schule (Wilhelm Dilich's War School: Highly Reasonably Founded and Established, Divided into Certain Classes, Previously Kept Closed, Now Opened), 1647
- Kriegsbuch Wilhelmi Dilichii, darin die Alte und Newe Militia aller örter vermehret, eigentlich beschribe (War Book of Wilhelm Dilich, Wherein the Old and New Military of All Places is Expanded and Properly Described)
- Vitae professorum thelogiae qui in… Academia Marburgensi…docuerunt…Accedit Wilhelm Dilichii manuscript (Lives of the Professors of Theology Who Taught at the Academy of Marburg, with Wilhelm Dilich's Manuscript)
