= Sophia of Holstein-Gottorp =

Sophia of Schleswig-Holstein-Gottorp
- Duchess of Mecklenburg-Schwerin
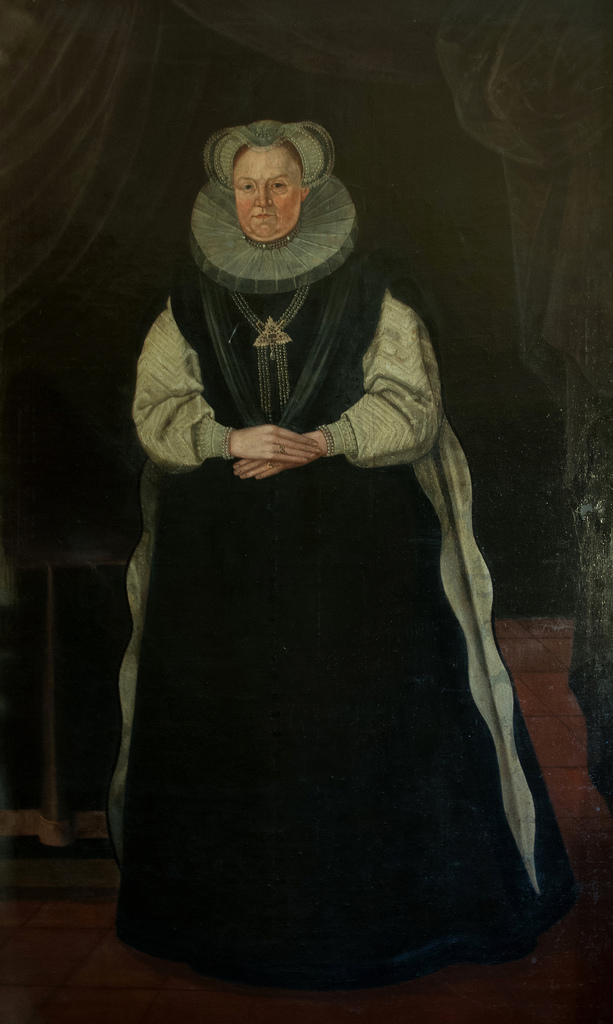
- Portrait by Daniel Blok, 1635
- Born: 1 June 1569; Gottorf Castle
- Died: 14 November 1634 (aged 65); Schwerin
- Spouse: John VII, Duke of Mecklenburg
- Issue: Adolf Frederick I John Albert II
- House: House of Holstein-Gottorp
- Father: Adolf, Duke of Holstein-Gottorp
- Mother: Christine of Hesse

Sophia of Schleswig-Holstein-Gottorp (1 June 1569 at Gottorf Castle – 14 November 1634 in Schwerin) was regent of the Duchy of Mecklenburg-Schwerin from 1603 to 1608.

== Life ==
Sophia was the eldest daughter of Duke Adolph of Holstein-Gottorp and his wife Christine of Hesse. She married on 17 February 1588 in Reinbek to Duke John VII of Mecklenburg. John was a weak ruler who was unable to rule his indebted and corrupt country. Sophia almost lived in poverty.

In 1592, her husband stabbed himself to death. Initially, Duke Ulrich of Mecklenburg took up the regency and Sophia retreated to her widow's seat in Lübz. The country visibly declined during the administration of governors sent by Duke Ulrich.

Sophia administered her wittum, the districts of Rehna and Wittenburg very cautiously, economically and carefully. After Duke Ulrich died in 1603, Duke Charles I asked Sophia to administer Mecklenburg-Schwerin on behalf of her underage sons. She took up the challenge and acted energetically against the abuses of the previous administration. She managed to improve the Duchy's financial situation.

In 1608, Duke Charles I asked the emperor to declare Sophia's eldest son an adult. Her sons had been estranged from her for some time. During their reign, the country descended into financial chaos again. Sophia returned to Lübz. In 1628, Wallenstein conquered Mecklenburg and forced her sons to leave the country. However, he left her in peace.

Sophia died on 14 November 1634. The later Grand Dukes of Mecklenburg-Schwerin and Mecklenburg-Strelitz all descend from her.

== Issue ==
- Adolf Frederick I, Duke of Mecklenburg-Schwerin from 1592 to 1628 and from 1631 to 1658
- John Albert II, Duke of Mecklenburg-Güstrow from 1592 to 1628 and from 1631 to 1636
- Anna Sophie (1591-1648)

== Ancestors ==
Ancestors of Sophia of Holstein-Gottorp

16. Dietrich, Count of Oldenburg
8. Christian I of Denmark
17. Hedvig of Holstein
4. Frederick I of Denmark
18. John, Margrave of Brandenburg-Kulmbach
9. Dorothea of Brandenburg
19. Barbara of Saxe-Wittenberg
2. Adolf, Duke of Holstein-Gottorp
20. Eric II, Duke of Pomerania
10. Bogislaw X, Duke of Pomerania
21. Sophia of Pomerania-Stolp
5. Sophie of Pomerania
22. Casimir IV Jagiellon
11. Anna Jagiellon
23. Elizabeth of Austria
1. Sophia of Holstein-Gottorp
24. Louis II, Landgrave of Lower Hesse
12. William II, Landgrave of Hesse
25. Mechthild of Württemberg-Urach
6. Philip I, Landgrave of Hesse
26. Magnus II, Duke of Mecklenburg
13. Anna of Mecklenburg-Schwerin
27. Sophie of Pomerania-Stettin
3. Christine of Hesse
28. Albert III, Duke of Saxony
14. George, Duke of Saxony
29. Sidonie Podiebrad
7. Christine of Saxony
30. Casimir IV Jagiellon (= 22)
15. Barbara Jagiellon
31. Elizabeth of Austria (= 23)
