= Hedwig of Hesse-Kassel =

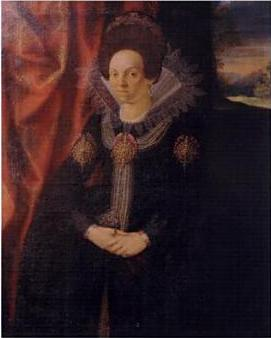
- Hedwig of Hesse-Kassel, Princess of Schaumburg, painting from 1612 by Johannes Rottenhammer
- Born: 30 June 1569; Kassel
- Died: 7 July 1644 (aged 75); Hagen
- Spouse: Ernst of Schaumburg
- House: House of Hesse
- Father: William IV, Landgrave of Hesse-Kassel
- Mother: Sabine of Württemberg

Hedwig of Hesse-Kassel (born 30 June 1569 in Kassel; died: 7 July 1644 in Hagen) was a princess of Hesse-Kassel by birth and by marriage a Countess of Schaumburg.

== Life ==
Hedwig was a daughter of Landgrave William IV of Hesse-Kassel (1532–1592) from his marriage to Sabine (1549–1581), a daughter of Duke Christopher of Württemberg.

She married on 11 September 1597 at Wilhelmsburg Castle in Schmalkalden with Count Ernst of Schaumburg (1569–1622). When Hedwig was engaged in 1593, Hedwig's brother Maurice had made it a condition that Ernst would share the government of Schaumburg with his half-brother Adolph. In 1559, Schaumburg was divided by the Treaty of Minden, and Ernst received Lower Schaumburg, consisting of the districts Sachsenhagen, Hagenburg and Bokeloh.

Hedwig and Ernst initially lived at the available castle in Sachsenhagen, and extended it to a palace; Ernst later moved his seat of government to Bückeburg. Ernst died in 1627. Hedwig constructed a Princely Mausoleum in the St.-Martini Church in Stadthagen.

Their marriage remained childless. Hedwig received the city and district of Stadthagen as her wittum. She possessed a Hessian bond of 100000thaler without interest. She gave her nephew William V an annual pension and later bequeathed her bond and all her dower rights to the county of Schaumburg to his widow, Landgravine Amalie Elisabeth, whom she also appointed executrix of her last will and testament.

Hedwig died in 1644 and was buried in the Princely Mausoleum in the St.-Martini Church in Stadthagen, next to her husband. An epitaph above her grave reads: There is no other, holier decision of widowhood, than to pass down to the living that which was entrusted by the last will and to guard it, when it is realized.
