= Hermann IV =

Hermann IV may refer to:

- Herman IV, Duke of Swabia (died 1038)
- Hermann IV, Margrave of Baden (1135–1190)
- Hermann IV of Hesse (1450–1508)
- Herman IV, Landgrave of Hesse-Rotenburg (1607–1658)
