= Agnes of Solms-Laubach =

Countess of Solms-Laubach; Landgravine of Hesse-Kassel

- Landgravine of Hesse-Kassel
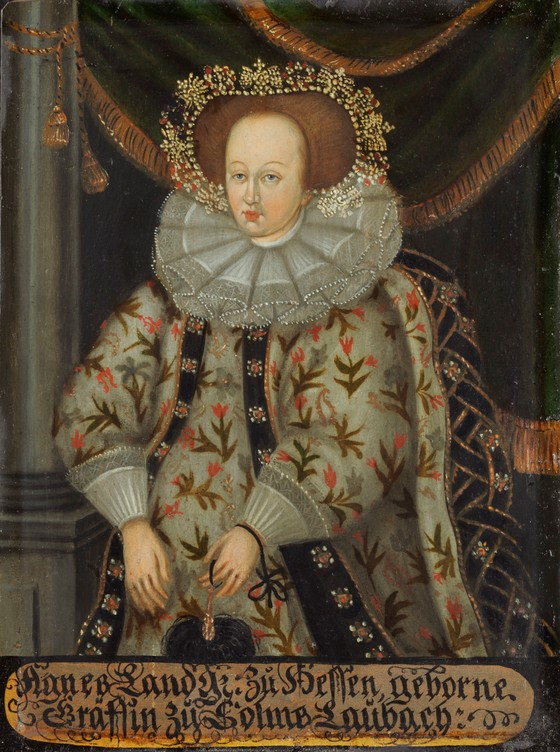
- 17th-century portrait
- Born: 7 January 1578; Laubach, Solms-Laubach
- Died: 23 November 1602 (aged 24); Laubach
- Noble family: Solms-Laubach
- Spouse: Maurice, Landgrave of Hesse-Kassel (m. 1593)
- Issue: Otto, Landgrave of Hesse-Kassel; Elizabeth of Hesse-Kassel, Duchess of Mecklenburg; William V, Landgrave of Hesse-Kassel
- Father: John George, Count of Solms-Laubach
- Mother: Margaret of Schönburg-Glauchau

Agnes of Solms-Laubach (7 January 1578 – 23 November 1602) was a Countess of Solms-Laubach and, by marriage, Landgravine of Hesse-Kassel from 1593 until her death.

== Life ==
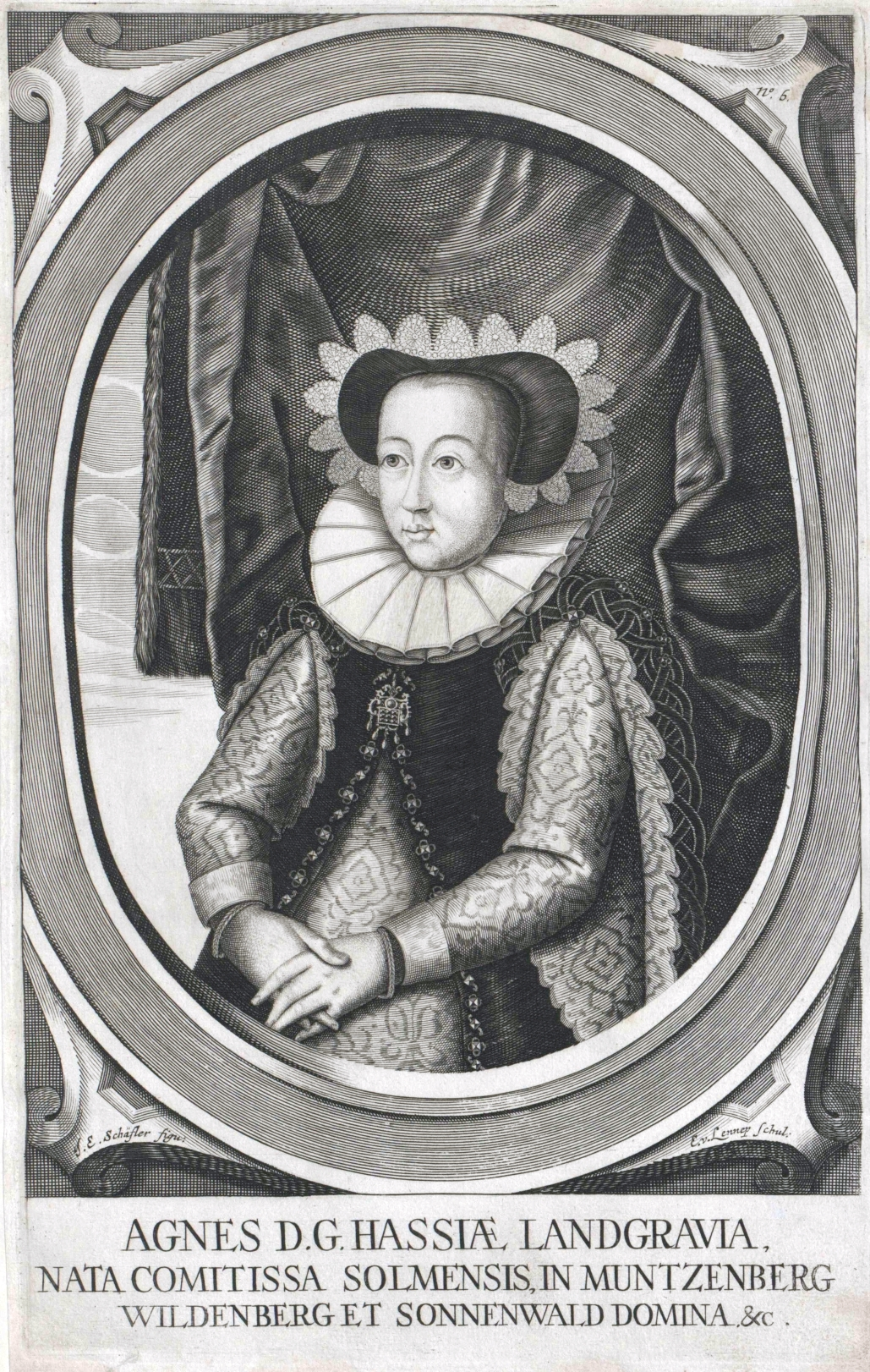
Engraving of Agnes by Johann Engelhard Schäfler, 17th century

Agnes was a daughter of Count John George, son of Count Frederick Magnus I of Solms-Laubach, from his marriage to Margaret of Schönburg-Glauchau.

She married at the age of 15, on 23 September 1593, to Kassel Landgrave Maurice of Hesse-Kassel, whom she had met at the wedding of his oldest sister Anna Maria. Anna's wedding was celebrated in the presence of numerous princely guests. The marriage to the Calvinist Countess increased Maurice ties with the Calvinist counts of Wetterau considerably, although Maurice had chosen Agnes as his wife more out of love than of dynastic calculation.

Agnes was described as exceptionally talented, beautiful and lovable. Matthäus Merian made an embroidery of the countess with her husband and children. On the day after Anna's death, Maurice wrote to King Henry IV of France about his great loss.

== Offspring ==
From her marriage with Maurice, Agnes had following children:

- Otto (1594–1617)

married firstly in 1613 Princess Katharina Ursula of Baden-Durlach (1593–1615)
married secondly in 1617 Princess Agnes Magdalena of Anhalt-Dessau (1590–1626)

- Elisabeth (1596–1625)

married in 1618 Duke John Albert II of Mecklenburg-Güstrow (1590–1636)

- Maurice (1600–1612)
- William V (1602–1637), Landgrave of Hesse-Kassel

married in 1619 Countess Amalie Elisabeth of Hanau-Münzenberg (1602–1651)

Agnes of Solms-Laubach House of Solms-Laubach Born: 7 January 1578 Died: 23 November 1602
Royal titles
Vacant Title last held by Sabine of Württemberg	Landgravine of Hesse-Kassel; 23 September 1593 – 23 November 1602	Vacant Title next held by Juliane of Nassau-Siegen
