= Agnes of Hesse-Kassel =

- Princess of Anhalt-Dessau
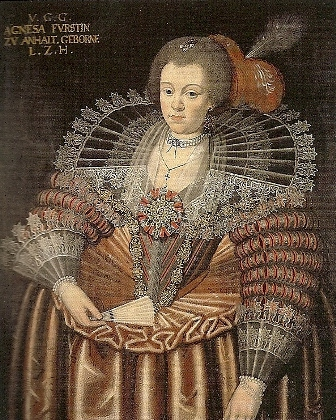
- Anonymous portrait, 17th century
- Born: 14 May 1606; Kassel
- Died: 28 May 1650 (aged 44); Dessau
- Spouse: John Casimir, Prince of Anhalt-Dessau
- Issue: John George II, Prince of Anhalt-Dessau; Louise of Anhalt-Dessau
- House: House of Hesse
- Father: Maurice, Landgrave of Hesse-Kassel
- Mother: Juliane of Nassau-Siegen

Agnes of Hesse-Kassel (14 May 1606 – 28 May 1650) was a princess of Hesse-Kassel by birth and by marriage Princess of Anhalt-Dessau.

== Life ==
Agnes was a daughter of Landgrave Maurice of Hesse-Kassel from his second marriage to Juliane of Nassau-Siegen, the daughter of Count John VII of Nassau-Siegen. She was raised together with her siblings. She spoke six languages and composed music.

On 18 May 1623 she married Prince John Casimir of Anhalt-Dessau. During the Thirty Years' War, she managed to soften the plight of Anhalt-Dessau by negotiating with the generals, both orally and in writing. She was considered a keen economist and mathematician. In 1645, she built a fortified house in Nischwitz, which was later developed into Oranienbaum Castle.

== Issue ==
From her marriage Agnes had the following children:

- Maurice (1624-1624)
- Dorothea (1625-1626)
- Juliane (1626-1652)
- John George II (1627-1693), who was Prince of Anhalt-Dessau from 1660 to 1693

married in 1659 to Princess Henriette Catherine of Nassau (1637-1708)

- Louise (1631-1680)

married in 1648 to Duke Christian of Brzeg (1618-1672)

- Agnes (1644-1644)
