= Johann Wilhelm Dilich =

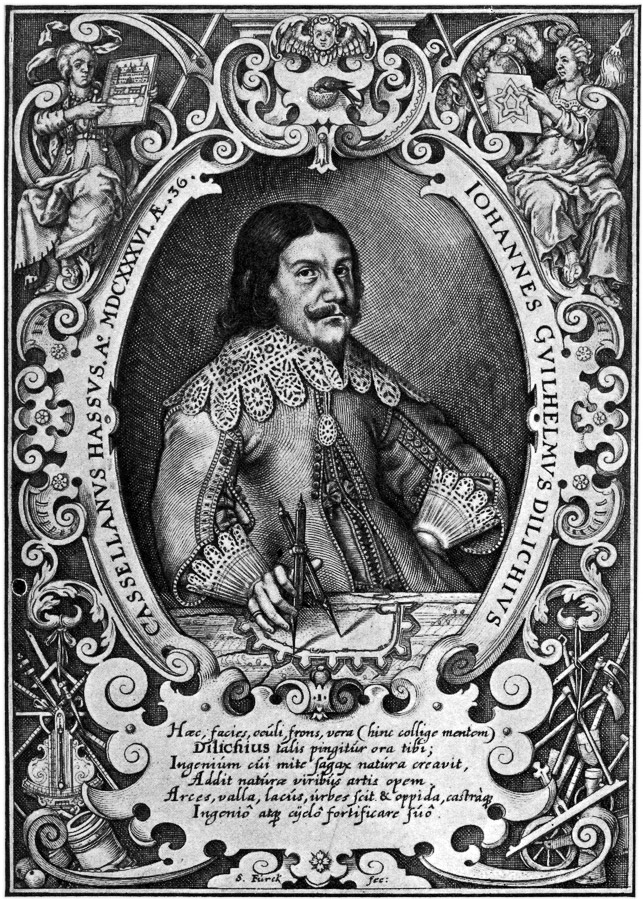
Johann Wilhelm Dilich, 1636 (Copper engraving by Sebastian Furck)

Johann Wilhelm Dilich (1600 – 1657) worked between 1628 and 1657 as an engineer and master builder in Frankfurt am Main.

Born in Kassel, we was the son of master builder Wilhelm Dilich. He used instruments made by the imperial instrument maker Erasmus Habermehl (died in 1606 in Prague). Dilich had uniform leather cases produced for these devices:

- Octagonal vertical sundial signed "Erasmus Habermehl fecit 89"
- Conversion plate with slide signed "Erasmus habermehl"
- Octagonal vertical sundial signed "E.H.fecit"
- Theodolite signed "Erasmus Habermehl"
- Round vertical sundial

== Works ==
- Peribologia oder Bericht Wilhelmi Dilichij Hist: Von Vestungsgebewen Vieler orter, as well as with native reasons and published by Johannem Wilhelmum Dilichium, Frankfurt 1640
- Peribologia Seu Muniendorum Locor[um] Ratio Wilhelmi Dilichii, Edita Sumptus Et Typos Suppedi Tante Joanne Wilhelmo Dilichio F: Architecto, Frankfurt 1641
- Kurtzer Unterricht Wie auff Unterschiedene Arten mann einen fürgegebenen Platz Fortificiren kan, Frankfurt 1642
- His drawings of the Frankfurt fortress were kept in the city archive and were lost during the Second World War.

== Bibliography ==
- Tobias Büchi: Das Festungsbuch Wilhelm & Johann Wilhelm Dilichs, in Scholion 3, 2004, p. 187-190.
