= Duchess Sabine of Württemberg =

Landgravine of Hesse-Kassel (1549–1581)

Sabine of Württemberg
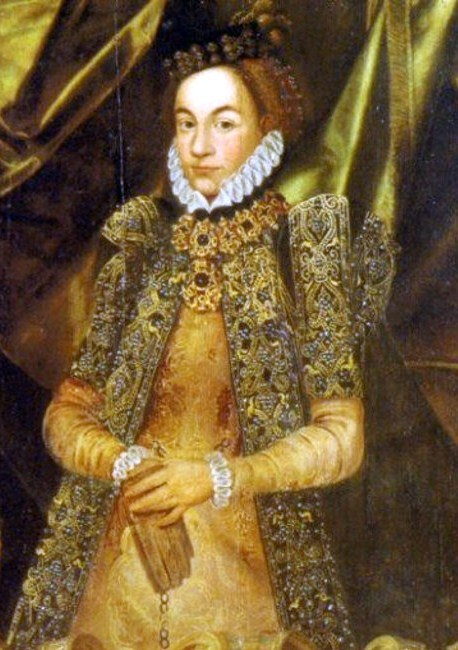
- Born: 2 July 1549; Montbéliard
- Died: 17 August 1581 (aged 32); Rotenburg an der Fulda
- Burial: Martinskirche, Kassel
- Spouse: William IV, Landgrave of Hesse-Kassel (m. 1566)
- Issue: Anna Maria, Countess of Nassau-Weilburg; Hedwig, Countess of Schaumburg; Maurice, Landgrave of Hesse-Kassel; Christine, Duchess of Saxe-Eisenach
- House: Württemberg
- Father: Christopher, Duke of Württemberg
- Mother: Anna Maria of Brandenburg-Ansbach

Sabine of Württemberg (2 July 1549, in Montbéliard – 17 August 1581, in Rotenburg an der Fulda) was a princess of Württemberg by birth and by marriage, the first Landgravine of Hesse-Kassel.

== Life ==
Sabine was a daughter of Duke Christopher of Württemberg (1515–1568) from his marriage to Anna Maria (1526–1589), daughter of Margrave George of Brandenburg-Ansbach-Kulmbach.

She married on 11 February 1566 in Marburg Landgrave William IV of Hesse-Kassel, whose younger brother Louis IV, Landgrave of Hesse-Marburg was already married with Sabine's older sister Hedwig and whom she had met when William negotiated Louis's marriage with her father. Their wedding was celebrated very lavishly.

The countess looked after the welfare of the country and founded the Free Court Pharmacy in Kassel, which served not only to supply the court but also the entire population of Kassel.

Sabine and Wilhelm's marriage has been described as a happy one. Wilhelm determined in his first will that, in the event of his premature death, Sabine would act as regent of the country for her eldest son Maurice. She died, however, in 1581, before her husband and in a new testament, he declared his son Maurice to have reached majority.

Sabine died in 1581 and was buried in the Martinskirche, Kassel.

== Offspring ==
From her marriage Sabine had the following children:

- Anna Marie (1567–1626)

married in 1589 Count Louis II of Nassau-Saarbrücken (1565–1627)

- Hedwig (1569–1644)

married in 1597 Count Ernst of Schaumburg (1569–1622)

- Agnes (1569–1569)
- Sophie (1571–1616)
- Maurice (1572–1632), Landgrave of Hesse-Kassel

married firstly, in 1593 Countess Agnes of Solms-Laubach (1578–1602)
married secondly, in 1603 Countess Juliane of Nassau-Siegen (1587–1643)

- Sabine (1573)
- Sidonie (1574–1575)
- Christian (1575–1578)
- Elisabeth (1577–1578)
- Christine (1578–1658)

married in 1598 Duke John Ernest II of Saxe-Eisenach (1566–1638)

- Julie (1581)

Duchess Sabine of Württemberg House of Württemberg Born: 2 July 1549 Died: 17 August 1581
Royal titles
Vacant Title last held by Christine of Saxony as Landgravine of Hesse	Landgravine of Hesse-Kassel; 31 March 1567 – 17 August 1582	Vacant Title next held by Agnes of Solms-Laubach
