= Karl Schmidt (footballer) =

German footballer (1932–2018)

santhosh
Personal information
- Full name: Karl Schmidt
- Date of birth: 5 March 1932
- Place of birth: Wabern, Germany
- Date of death: 10 July 2018 (aged 86)
- Place of death: Göttingen, Germany
- Position: Defender

Senior career*
Years	Team	Apps	(Gls)
1951–1955	KSV Hessen Kassel		
1955–1960	1. FC Kaiserslautern		
1960–1963	FK Pirmasens		
1963–1964	SC Baden-Baden		

International career
1955–1957	West Germany	9	(0)
- * Club domestic league appearances and goals

Karl Schmidt (5 March 1932 – 10 July 2018) was a German international footballer who played as a defender for KSV Hessen Kassel, 1. FC Kaiserslautern and FK Pirmasens.
