= Ernest I, Landgrave of Hesse-Rheinfels =

Holy Roman Empire noble (1623–1693)

Ernest, Landgrave of Hesse-Rheinfels
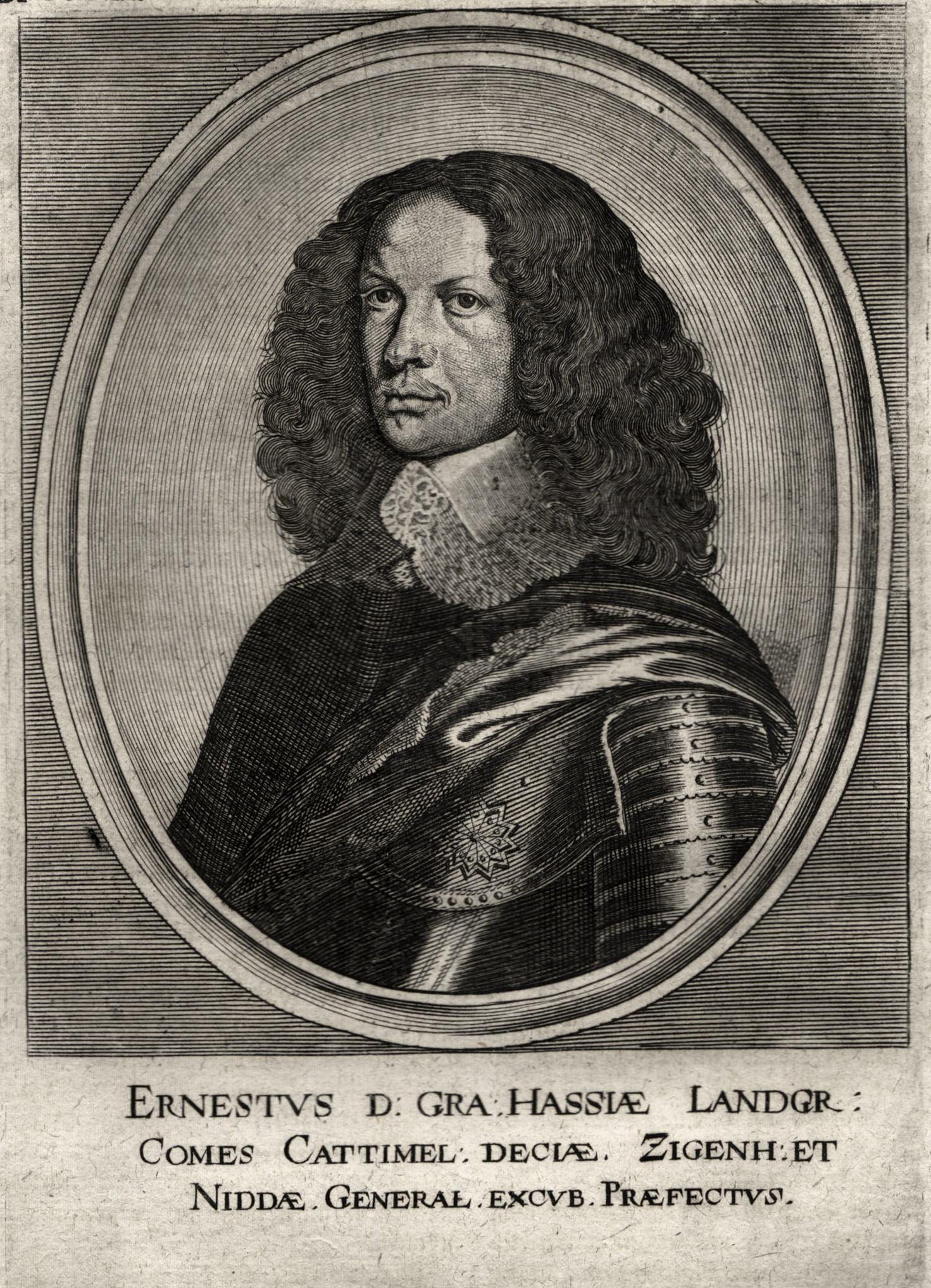
- Ernest, Landgrave of Hesse-Rheinfels
- Born: 8 December 1623; Kassel
- Died: 2 May 1693 (aged 69); Cologne
- Buried: Pilgrimage Church in Kamp-Bornhofen
- Noble family: House of Hesse
- Spouse: Maria Eleonore of Solms-Lich
- Issue: William; Charles; Catherina
- Father: Maurice, Landgrave of Hesse-Kassel
- Mother: Juliane of Nassau-Siegen

Landgrave Ernest of Hesse-Rheinfels-Rotenburg (8 December 1623 – 2 May 1693) was from 1649 to 1658 Landgrave of Hesse-Rheinfels and from 1658 until his death Landgrave of Hesse-Rheinfels-Rotenburg. Because his brothers died young, all later Landgraves in the Rotenburg Quarter are descendants of Ernest. Hence, Ernest is known as the ancestor of the Catholic Rotenburg Quarter, a group of junior lines of the House of Hesse.

== Family ==
Ernst was the eleventh child of the second marriage of the Landgrave Maurice of Hesse-Kassel (1572–1632) with Juliane of Nassau-Siegen (1587–1643). He was a great-grandson of Philip I "the Magnanimous". Landgrave Ernst married in 1647 in Frankfurt with Countess Maria Eleonore of Solms-Lich (1632–1689). Two sons from this marriage outlived Ernest: William (1648–1725) and Charles (1649–1711), and one daughter Catherina (1655–1719), who would marry into the aristocratic British Pye Family, through Richard, the son of Sir Robert Pye.

== Life ==
Ernest was brought up as a Calvinist during the Thirty Years' War. He made his Grand Tour to France and Italy, and fought with Hesse-Kassel during the final years of the war, for example at the Battle of Nördlingen on 3 August 1645. In 1647, the army of Landgravine Amalie Elisabeth reconquered Lower Katzenelnbogen and returned it to Hesse-Kassel. In 1649, Ernest came of age and received Lower Katzenelnbogen. This made him the founder of the Hesse-Rheinfels line. Hesse-Rheinfels was not considered sovereign: it remained under the sovereignty of Hesse-Kassel, as did the other parts of the Rotenburg Quarter. Details of the relationship between Hesse-Rheinfels and Hesse-Kassel were laid down in a series of house treaties; nevertheless, political and judicial disputes often arose between the two houses.

Ernest chose Burg Rheinfels castle, above St. Goar on the left bank of the Rhine, as his residence and extended the castle to an imposing fortress. The new Landgrave made his official entry into St. Goar on 30 March 1649. The construction activities associated with the extension of his castle and the fact that many landgraviate authorities resided at Rheinfels, contributed significantly to the economic boom of St. Goar, which had suffered severely from the Thirty Years' War.

Ernest and his family converted to Catholicism on 6 January 1652 in Cologne. However, he could not make Catholicism the established religion in his territory, because it fell under the jurisdiction of Hesse-Kassel and his half-nephew Landgrave William VI would not allow Ernest to undermine his authority and deviate from Calvinism, the established religion in Hesse-Kassel. In 1654, a compromise was reached: the Treaty of Ravensburg allowed Ernest to create three Catholic parishes in his landgraviate, in St. Goar, Nastätten and Langen-Schwalbach.

After the death of his brothers Frederick in 1655 and Herman IV in 1658, he inherited their sections of the Rotenburg Quarter. He then called himself Ernest of Hesse-Rotenburg-Rheinfels.

Ernest was very interested in religious matters; he was also religiously tolerant. In 1666, he had the Rheinfelsen Book of Hymns printed, which contained Catholic, Lutheran, and Reformed hymns. Ernest corresponded with the leading scholars of his time, such as Gottfried Wilhelm Leibniz.

Ernest died in 1693 and was buried, at his request, in the Pilgrimage Church in Bornhofen Monastery in Kamp-Bornhofen.

Ernest I, Landgrave of Hesse-Rheinfels House of Hesse Born: 8 December 1623 Died: 2 May 1693
Preceded by Maurice as Landgrave of Hesse-Kassel	Landgrave of Hesse-Rheinfels; 1649–1693	Succeeded by William as Landgrave of Hesse-Rheinfels-Rotenburg
Preceded by Frederick	Landgrave of Hesse-Eschwege; 1655–1667	Succeeded by Charles as Landgrave of Hesse-Wanfried
Preceded by Herman IV	Landgrave of Hesse-Rotenburg; 1658–1693	Succeeded by William as Landgrave of Hesse-Rheinfels-Rotenburg
