= John Albert II =

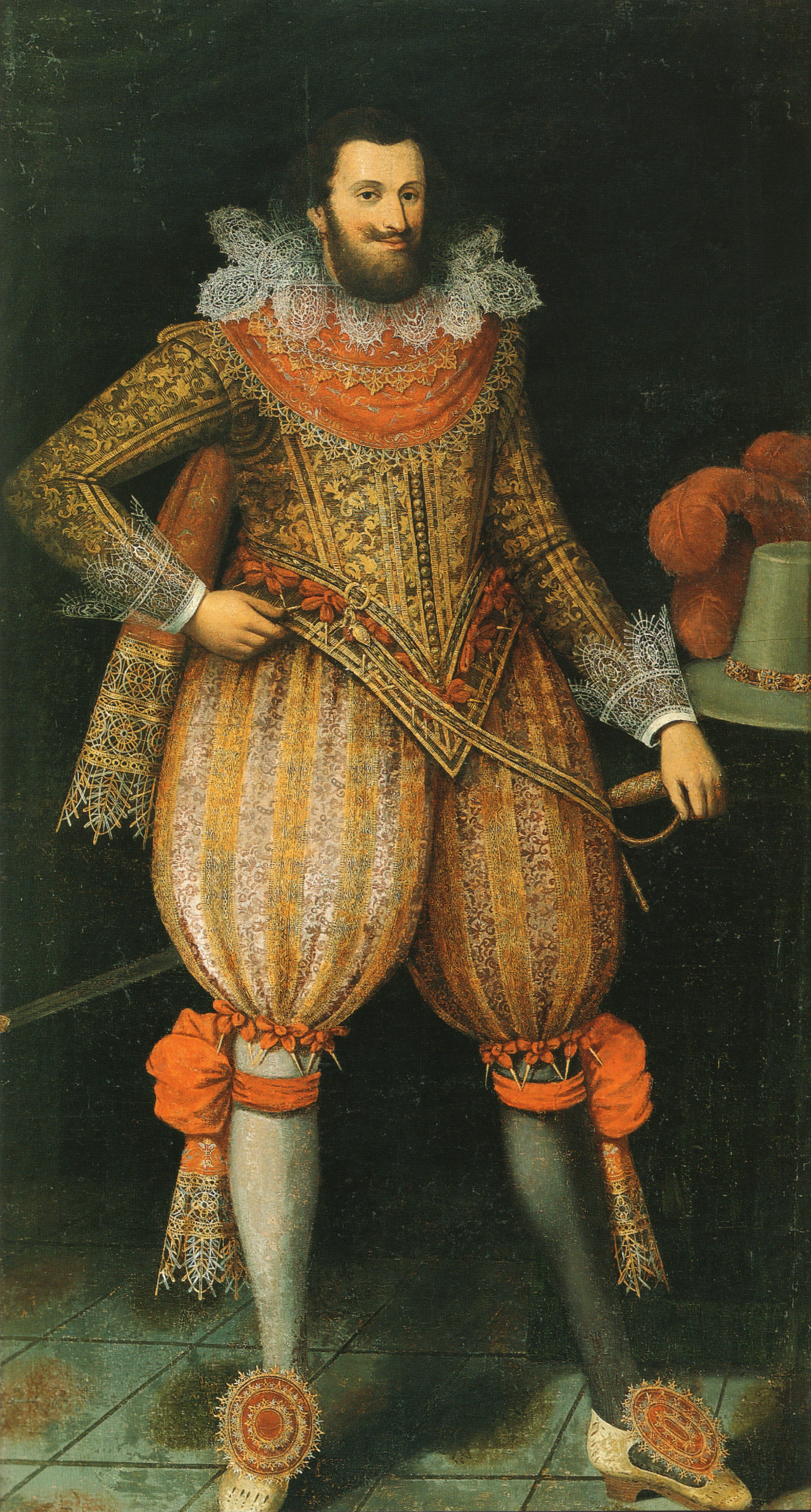
- Portrait by Daniel Blok, c. 1635 (National Museum, Warsaw)

Duke of Mecklenburg-Güstrow
- Reign: 22 July 1610 - 23 April 1636 (Deposed by Wallenstein 1628-1631)
- Predecessor: Charles I
- Successor: Gustav Adolph
- Born: 5 May 1590; Waren
- Died: 23 April 1636 (aged 45); Güstrow
- Spouse: Margaret Elizabeth of Mecklenburg (m. 1608; died 1616) Elizabeth of Hesse-Kassel (m. 1618; died 1625) Eleonore Marie of Anhalt-Bernburg (m. 1626)
- Issue Detail: Elisabeth Sophie, Duchess of Brunswick-Lüneburg; Gustav Adolph, Duke of Mecklenburg-Güstrow
- House: House of Mecklenburg
- Father: John VII, Duke of Mecklenburg
- Mother: Sophia of Schleswig-Holstein-Gottorp

John Albert II (5 May 1590 in Waren – 23 April 1636 in Güstrow) was a duke of Mecklenburg. From 1608 to 1611, he was the nominal ruler of Mecklenburg-Schwerin; the actual ruler being the regent, his great-uncle Charles I. From 1611 to 1621, John Albert and his brother Adolf Frederick I jointly ruled the whole Duchy of Mecklenburg. From 1621, John Albert ruled Mecklenburg-Güstrow alone.

== Life ==
John Albert was the son of Duke John VII and Sophia of Schleswig-Holstein-Gottorp.

He reigned from 16 April 1608, under the regency of his great-uncle Duke Charles I, jointly with his brother Adolf Frederick I in the Mecklenburg-Schwerin part of the country. After Charles's death, the Emperor declared Adolf Frederick an adult and he ruled alone until John Albert came of age and they began to rule jointly.

In 1617 he converted to Protestantism. In the division of Mecklenburg of 1621, John Albert received Mecklenburg-Güstrow.

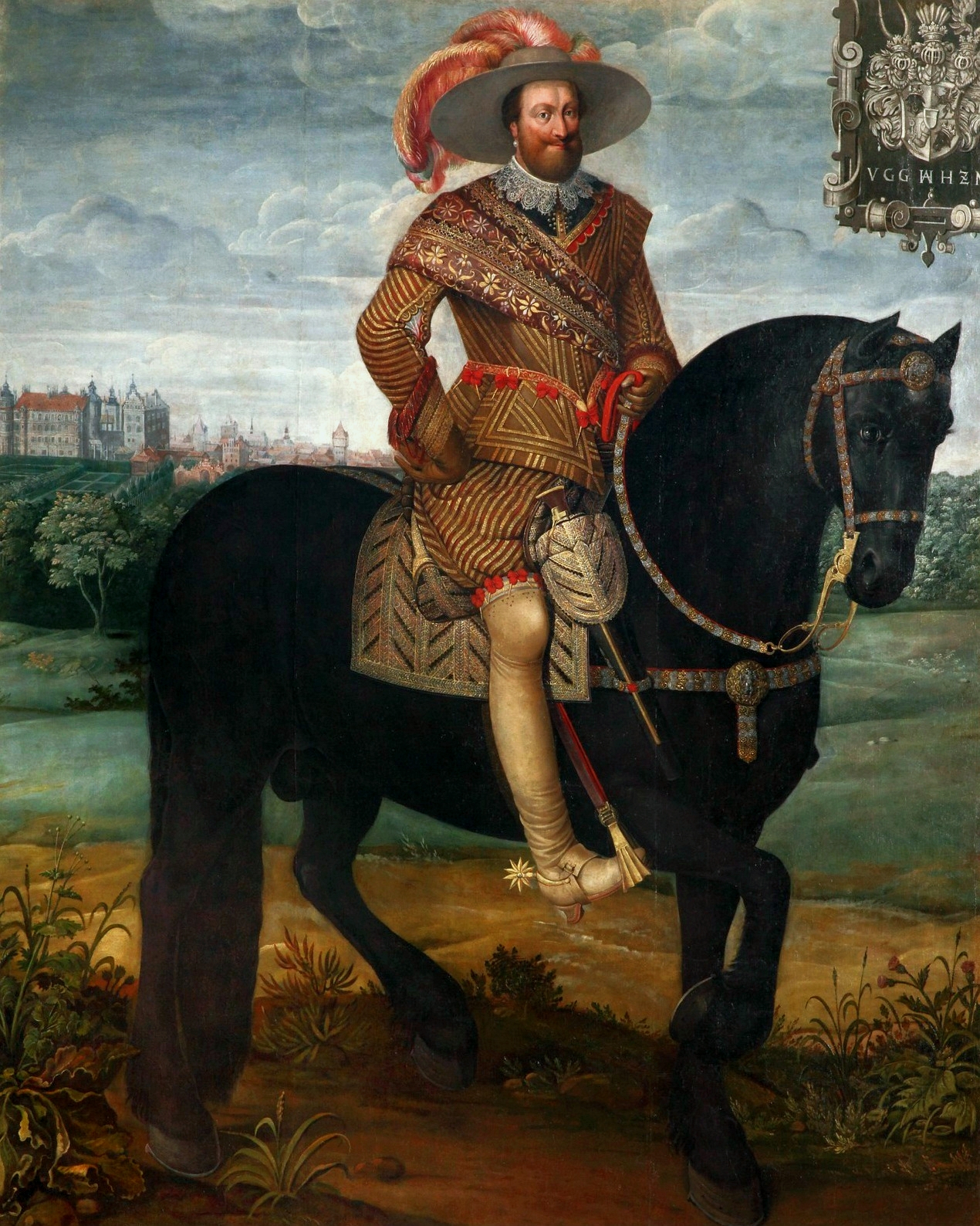
John Albert II on horse back, by Daniel Blok, 1635

In 1623, both brothers joined a defensive alliance of the Lower Saxon Estates. They tried to seem neutral during the Thirty Years' War, but they secretly supported the Danish troops of king Christian IV. After the Imperial side won the Battle of Lutter, Tilly treated them as enemies. On 19 January 1628, Emperor Ferdinand II issue a decree at Brandýs Castle declaring that the brothers had forfeited their fief and that Mecklenburg would be invested to Wallenstein. In May 1628, the brothers left the Duchy, at the request of Wallenstein. In May 1631, Wallenstein was overthrown by Swedish troops, and the brothers returned.

John Albert II died in 1636 and was buried in the Minster in Güstrow.

== Marriage and issue ==
John Albert II was married three times.

(I) On 9 October 1608 he married Margaret Elizabeth (11 July 1584 – 16 November 1616), daughter of Duke Christopher of Mecklenburg. The couple had the following children:

- John Christopher (1611–1612)
- Elisabeth Sophie (20 August 1613 – 12 July 1676)

married Duke Augustus II of Brunswick-Wolfenbüttel

- Christine Margaret (31 March 1615 – 16 August 1666)

married firstly on 11 February 1640 Francis Albert of Saxe-Lauenburg, son of Francis II
married secondly, on 6 July 1650 Duke Christian Louis I of Mecklenburg-Schwerin (divorced 1663)

- Charles Henry (1616–1618)

(II) On 26 March 1618, he married Elizabeth of Hesse-Kassel (24 May 1596 – 16 December 1625), daughter of Landgrave Maurice of Hesse-Kassel. This marriage remained childless.

(III) He married his third wife, Eleonore Marie of Anhalt-Bernburg (7 August 1600 – 17 July 1657), daughter of Prince Christian I of Anhalt-Bernburg, on 7 May 1626. The couple had the following children:

- Anna Sophie (29 September 1628 – 10 February 1666)

married Duke Louis IV of Legnica

- John Christian (1629–1631)
- Eleanor (1630–1631)
- Gustav Adolph (1633–1695)
- Louise (20 May 1635 – 6 January 1648)

John Albert II House of Mecklenburg Born: 5 May 1590 Died: 23 April 1636
Preceded by Charles I	Duke of Mecklenburg-Güstrow; 1610–1628	Succeeded by Albrecht von Wallenstein
Preceded by Albrecht von Wallenstein	Duke of Mecklenburg-Güstrow; 1631–1636	Succeeded by Gustav Adolph
