= Mausoleum of Prince Ernst =

Mausoleum in Stadthagen, Lower Saxony

Coordinates: 52°19′24″N 9°12′26″E

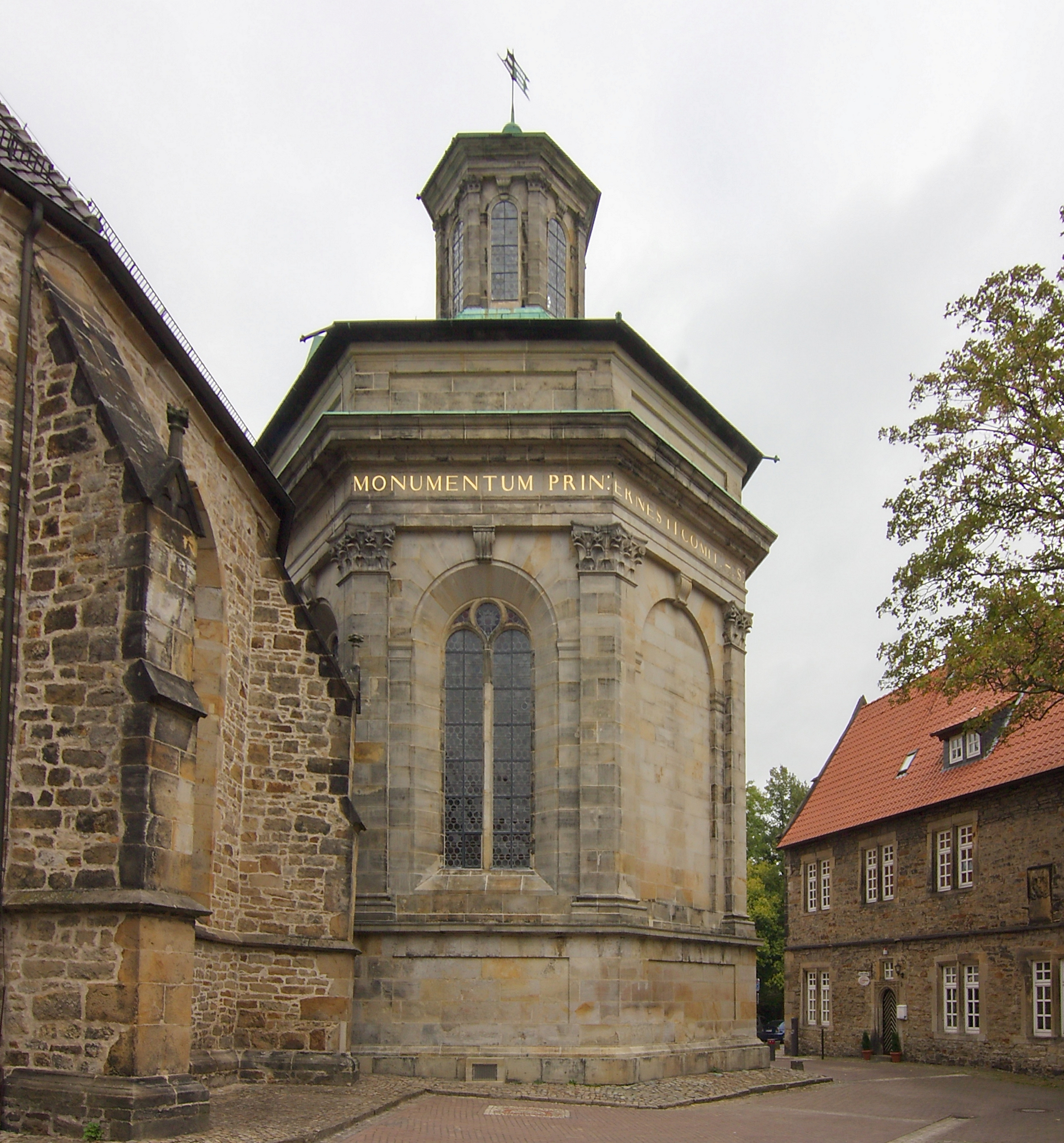
Mausoleum of Prince Ernst

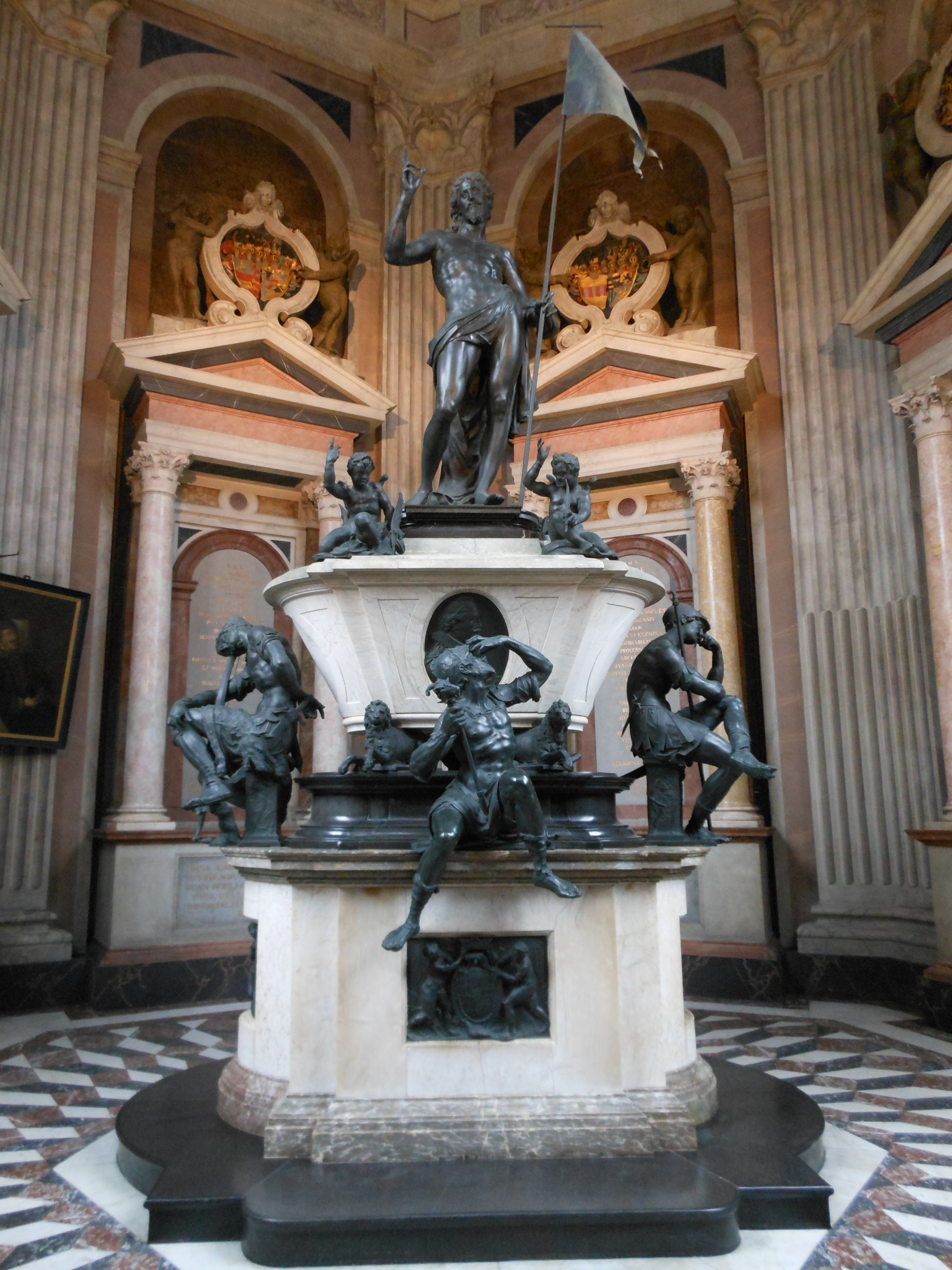
Resurrection monument by Adriaen de Vries

The Mausoleum of Prince Ernst in Stadthagen, Lower Saxony, is a mausoleum erected by Ernst of Schaumburg (d. 1622) and his widow Hedwig of Hesse-Kassel in the years 1620–1627. Its unusual architecture and the resurrection monument by Adrian de Vries make it a site of European rank. The crypt was used as burial place of the House of Schaumburg and the House of Schaumburg-Lippe until 1915.

The mausoleum, attached to the chancel of Stadthagen parish church St. Martini, is a domed heptagon in Italian renaissance style designed by Giovanni Maria Nosseni. Four of its walls are furnished with Latin inscribed epitaphs for Prince Ernst, his parents, and his wife, framed by aediculas with Italian marble columns. The central monument by Adriaen de Vries consists of a huge pedestal bearing the cenotaph of Prince Ernst – simultaneously conceived as the tomb of Christ: the cenotaph is surrounded by four drowsing Roman guards, and a larger-than-life figure of Christ triumphant surmounts its top. The dome, painted with fourteen musician angels, represents heaven.

== Burials in the crypt ==
- Philip I, Count of Schaumburg-Lippe
- Landgravine Sophie of Hesse-Kassel
- Frederick Christian, Count of Schaumburg-Lippe
- Philip II, Count of Schaumburg-Lippe
- Countess Eleonore Luise (1781–1783)
- George William, Prince of Schaumburg-Lippe
- Adolf I, Prince of Schaumburg-Lippe
- Princess Hermine of Waldeck and Pyrmont
- Princess Ida of Schaumburg-Lippe
- Prince Hermann of Schaumburg-Lippe (1848–1928)
