= Wabern, Hesse =

Wabern
- Municipality
- Coat of arms

- Location of Wabern within Schwalm-Eder-Kreis district
- Interactive map of Wabern
- Location within Germany Location within Hesse
- Coordinates: 51°06′N 09°20′E
- Country: Germany
- State: Hesse
- Admin. region: Kassel
- District: Schwalm-Eder-Kreis

Government
  - Mayor (2021–27): Claus Steinmetz (SPD)

Area
  - Total: 51.41 km^{2} (19.85 sq mi)
- Elevation: 166 m (545 ft)

Population (2025-12-31)
  - Total: 7,317
  - Density: 142.3/km^{2} (368.6/sq mi)
- Time zone: UTC+01:00 (CET)
  - Summer (DST): UTC+02:00 (CEST)
- Postal codes: 34590
- Dialling codes: 05683
- Vehicle registration: HR
- Website: www.wabern.de

Wabern (German pronunciation: [ˈvaːbɐn]) is a municipality in the Schwalm-Eder district in northern Hesse, Germany. It lies on the Main-Weser Railway between Kassel and Frankfurt. From Wabern, the Edersee Railway runs to Bad Wildungen.

== Geography ==
=== Location ===
The main centre of Wabern lies on the Eder and Schwalm floodplain, a few kilometres south of where the Schwalm empties into the Eder.

=== Constituent communities ===
The community of Wabern consists of ten centres, the main centre, bearing the same name as the whole municipality, and the nine outlying villages of Hebel, Rockshausen, Falkenberg, Udenborn, Unshausen, Uttershausen, Zennern, Niedermöllrich and Harle.

== Economy ==
Wabern is served by Wabern (Bz Kassel) railway station on the Frankfurt to Kassel main line. It is a stopping point for ICE trains with connections towards Hamburg and Karlsruhe. For many years it was an important railway junction, where the line to Brilon Wald (Wabern–Bad Wildungen and Wega–Brilon Wald lines) branched off the main line. Today the branch line ends at Bad Wildungen.

A big sugar factory processes the sugar beets in the autumn. These are grown over a wide area around the community.

== Politics ==
=== Mayors ===
In June 2015 Claus Steinmetz (SPD) was elected mayor with 60.7% of the votes.

=== Municipal partnerships ===
- Lormaison (Oise), France (with Uttershausen)

== Buildings ==
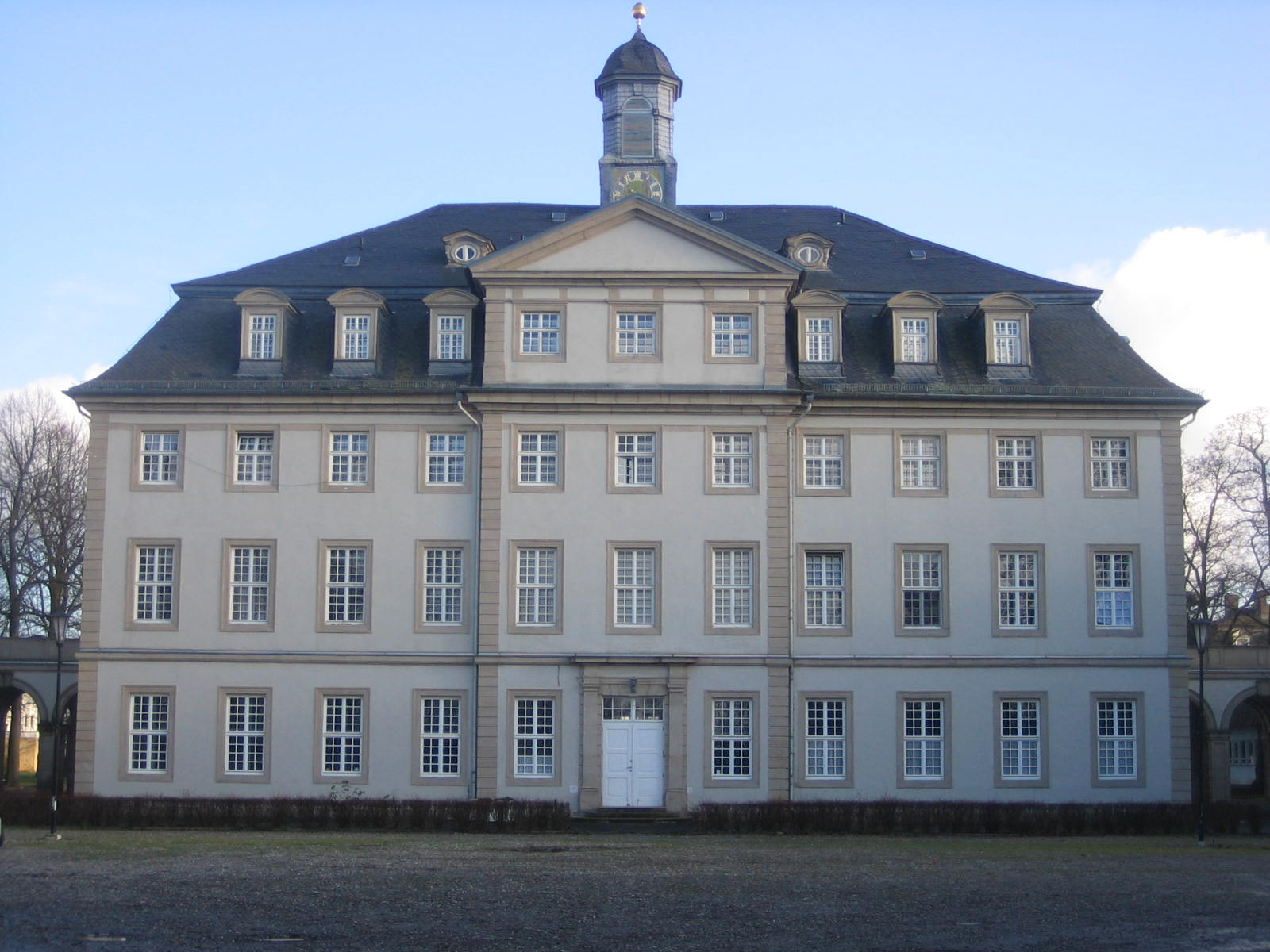
Jagd- und Lustschloss Wabern

The local stately home, Landgrave Karl von Hesse's Jagd- und Lustschloss Wabern (roughly "Wabern Hunting and Delight Palace"), was built in 1701, mainly so that the Landgrave could practise falconry in the nearby Reiherwald (forest). In 1770 some remodelling work was done under the well known Baroque architect Simon Louis du Ry. The Schloss nowadays houses a youth centre.

The Evangelical Church was likewise built in the 18th century. It features a remarkable Rococo organ.

== Personalities ==
- Karl Schmidt (1932-2018), footballer
- Wilhelm Dilich (1571–1650), engraver
- Rolf Hocke (1955- ), football official
- Fritz Harney (1879–1953), industrialist
- Philipp Losch (1864–1953), historian
- Ludwig Schneider (1893-1977), politician
- Arnold Strippel (1911-1994), SS Obersturmführer and war criminal
