= Juliane of Nassau-Siegen (1587–1643) =

German landgravine (1587–1643)

- Landgravine of Hesse-Kassel
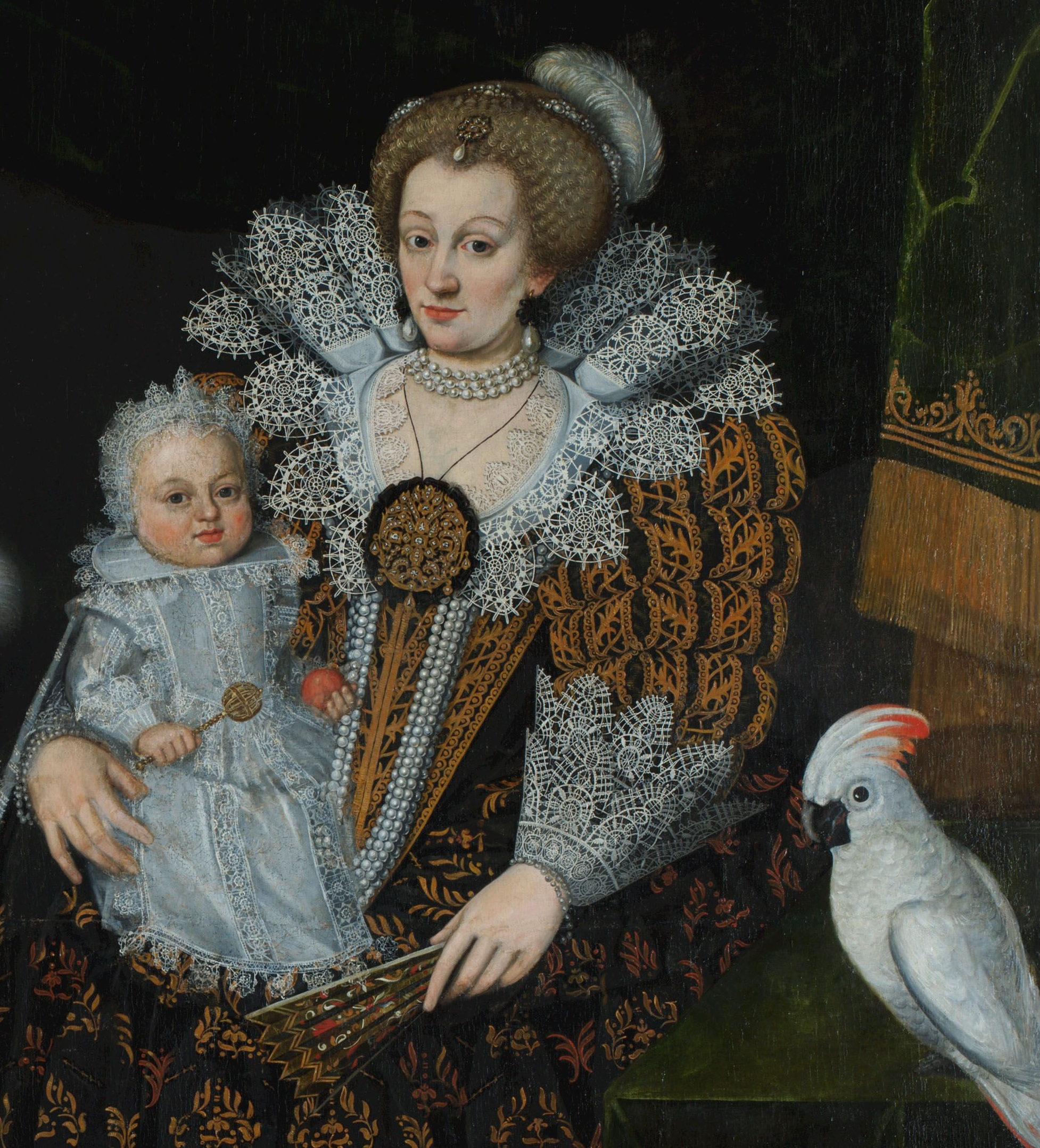
- Juliane with her youngest child, Elisabeth, c. 1628
- Born: 3 September 1587; Dillenburg Castle
- Died: 15 February 1643 (aged 55); Eschwege
- Buried: 23 March 1643; Kassel
- Noble family: House of Nassau-Siegen
- Spouse: Maurice of Hesse-Kassel (m. 1603; died 1632)
- Issue Detail: Philip of Hesse-Kassel; Agnes of Hesse-Kassel; Herman of Hesse-Rotenburg; Juliane of Hesse-Kassel; Sabine of Hesse-Kassel; Magdalene of Hesse-Kassel; Maurice of Hesse-Kassel; Sophie of Hesse-Kassel; Frederick of Hesse-Eschwege; Christian of Hesse-Kassel; Ernest of Hesse-Rheinfels; Christine of Hesse-Kassel; Philip of Hesse-Kassel; Elisabeth of Hesse-Kassel
- Father: John VII the Middle of Nassau-Siegen
- Mother: Magdalene of Waldeck-Wildungen

Juliane of Nassau-Siegen (3 September 1587 – 15 February 1643) was a countess from the House of Nassau-Siegen, a cadet branch of the Ottonian Line of the House of Nassau, and through marriage landgravine of Hesse-Kassel.

== Biography ==
Juliane was born at Dillenburg Castle on 3 September 1587 (Note: "Birthplace in Dek (1962), with the date 3-9 also found in Europäische Stammtafeln I, 98, while Europäische Stammtafeln I, 117 states 8-9. We have chosen the first of these two dates because the Personalia in the funeral sermon (quoted by Knetsch (1931)) says that she was born at Dillenburg Castle on 3 September 1587 «abends zwischen 7 und 8 Uhr».") as the fifth child and second daughter of Count John VII the Middle of Nassau-Siegen and his first wife, Countess Magdalene of Waldeck-Wildungen.

Juliane was brought up in the strict Calvinist tradition, but was also taught foreign languages. In addition to her siblings, the half-brothers and -sisters from her mother's first marriage also lived in the child-rich household at Dillenburg Castle. The marriage of her eldest half-brother, Philip Louis II of Hanau-Münzenberg, to Countess Catherine Belgica of Nassau, a daughter of William I of Orange, was also celebrated here in 1596, a festive highlight of Juliane's childhood.

In February 1603, only three months after the death of his first wife Agnes of Solms-Laubach, the thirty-year-old Maurice of Hesse-Kassel made a marriage proposal to the fifteen-year-old Juliane. The marriage took place three months later at Dillenburg Castle.

Through his marriage to Juliane, Maurice's religious policy was influenced as he forged the closest of alliances with the House of Nassau-Siegen, which practised an outspoken Calvinist policy in the Holy Roman Empire. In domestic politics, Juliane strengthened the weight of the Calvinist party in Kassel, thus sharpening Maurice's aversion to the nobility, who were already dissatisfied with his policies. Soon after his marriage, the Maurice was considered in imperial politics as a protagonist of the Calvinist cause, alongside the Electoral Palatinate, who were also relatives of the House of Nassau.

Despite her Calvinist upbringing, Juliane led a fairly representative court life with Maurice, but she always valued her financial independence and kept careful track of her expenses. As Maurice had three sons from his first marriage, Juliane soon sought to pass on income and property rights to her children.

In the autumn of 1623, troops of the Catholic League under Tilly were quartered in Hesse-Kassel. Maurice's diplomatic trips to the Protestant courts in Northern Germany were, despite his busy schedule, clearly escapist. Not only the Hessian estates of the realm, but also Juliane publicly accused him of having led the country to ruin and then abandoned it. When the estates independently entered into negotiations with Tilly to obtain the withdrawal of the troops of the Catholic League or at least a reduction in the war burden, Maurice accused them of treason. The breach that thus occurred was definitive. The estates, the councillors and Juliane in particular urged Maurice to resign from government. On 17 March 1627, he was forced to resign in favour of his son William V. Prior to this, Juliane had managed to secure a quarter of Hesse-Kassel – the so-called Rotenburger Quart – for her and her children in the House Treaty of 12 February 1627, in order to secure their income. From this quarter, after her sons Herman and Frederick died without heirs, emerged the cadet branch Hesse-Rheinfels-Rotenburg, founded by Ernest.

In the family conflict with Maurice, with whom she fought over money, household goods and the education of the children, Juliane first defended her own interests and then those of her children, but without coming to a confrontation with her stepson, the ruling Landgrave William V. But she was also very active in the conflict within her own Nassau-Siegen family. She stood up for the Calvinists in the county of Nassau-Siegen who suffered from the recatholicisation attempts of her brother John VIII the Younger, who had converted to the Catholic Church and was in Spanish service.

Juliane was able to put her interest in state administration into practice after she had gained the relevant knowledge in the Rotenburger Quart, which she initially managed together with her eldest son Herman. After her husband's resignation, Juliane stayed initially at Kassel Castle and moved with her children to Rotenburg an der Fulda in 1629, while Maurice lived first in Frankfurt and later in Eschwege. Faced with the threat of war, Juliane again sought brief shelter at Kassel Castle in 1631 and then lived until her death in the Nassauer Hof at the River Fulda, later called Packhof vor der Schlagd, which Maurice had given her in 1617.

Juliane was confident even in foreign policy; she attended the Electors' Day in Mulhouse in 1627 and contributed to the rapprochement between the branches Hesse-Kassel and Hesse-Darmstadt in the so-called 'Main Agreement'. Of far-reaching significance was the contact with Sweden that she initiated in 1630 through the mediation of her relatives from the House of Orange-Nassau, which led to the Swedish-Hessian Covenant of Werben in the following year, firmly binding the Landgrivate of Hesse-Kassel to Sweden.

Juliane died in Eschwege on 15 February 1643. (Note: "See Dek (1962) and Knetsch (1931). The latter mentions as sources: a) Schminke, Geschichte von Eschwege, 1857, p. 14; b) «Personalia» in the funeral sermon: «abends zwischen 5 und 6 Uhr»; c) Notification of Landgravine Amelia Elisabeth, Kassel 16‑2‑1643; d) Notification of Landgrave Herman of Hesse-Rotenburg (Dresden Archive N. 8658).") She was buried in Kassel on 23 March 1643. Adolphus Fabritius wrote a Leichenpredigt for her, which was published in Kassel in 1643.

== Marriage and children ==
Juliane and Maurice with all their 14 children, some of whom, however, never met, as they had already died before the birth of the youngest. Painting by August Erich, 1618–1628. Gemäldegalerie Alte Meister, Museumslandschaft Hessen Kassel.

Juliane married Maurice of Hesse-Kassel (Kassel, 25 May 1572 – Eschwege, 15 March 1632). The Beilager took place at Dillenburg Castle on 21 May 1603 (Note: "On 21‑5‑1603, in Europäische Stammtafeln I, 117. On 22‑5‑1603 in Europäische Stammtafeln I, 98 and in Dek (1962) and Dek (1970) (place of marriage: Dillenburg). Knetsch (1931) also indicates Dillenburg 22-5 (according to the Annals of the University of Marburg). According to this author (who refers to the Hessian matrimonial affairs) was it the marriage contract (pactum dotale) that was signed on 21-5; but he adds that the «présent du lendemain» (Morgengabeverschreibung) was signed on the 22nd. This information confirms that the marriage was celebrated religiously on the 21st (and was consummated on the night of the 21st to the 22nd): as we find in the State Archives Wiesbaden (130^{II} 2380^{II} d) a letter of invitation sent from Dillenburg on 11-5-1603 in which the Count of Nassau-Ottweiler was asked to arrive in Dillenburg on the 18th to attend the wedding «zur Vollziehung des ehelichen BEYLAGERS auff Sambstag den 21 hujus alhier». So there is no doubt that the date of the religious ceremony is Saturday 21-5-1603 (thus old style).") and the Heimführung in Kassel on 4 June 1603.

Juliane was frequently pregnant during her marriage; she gave birth to fourteen children in twenty-five years, but only seven of them lived to mature adulthood:

1. Philip (26 November 1604 – killed at the Battle of Lutter, 17 August 1626) was an officer in the Danish Army.
2. Agnes (13/14 May 1606 – 28 May 1650) married in Dessau on 18 May 1623 to John Casimir, Prince of Anhalt-Dessau.
3. Herman (15 August 1607 – 25 March 1658), Landgrave of Hesse-Rotenburg. Married:
  1. in Waldeck on 31 December 1633 to his first cousin Countess Sofia Juliana of Waldeck-Wildungen
  2. in Weimar on 2 January 1642 to Princess Cunegonda Juliane of Anhalt-Dessau
4. Juliane (7 October 1608 – Kassel, 11 December 1628) died in adolescence.
5. Sabine (5 July 1610 – Kassel, 21 May 1620) died in childhood.
6. Magdalene (25 August 1611 – 12 February 1671) married in Rotenburg an der Fulda on 27 April 1646 to Count Erik Adolf of Salm-Reifferscheid.
7. Maurice (13 June 1614 – Kassel, 16 February 1633) was a Rittmeister in the Swedish Army and died in adolescence.
8. Sophie (12 September 1615 – 22 November 1670) married in Stadthagen on 12 October 1644 to Philip I of Schaumburg-Lippe.
9. Frederick (9 May 1617 – killed in battle, 24 September 1655), Landgrave of Hesse-Eschwege. Married in Stockholm on 6 September 1646 to Countess Palatine Eleonore Catharine of Zweibrücken.
10. Christian (5 February 1622 – 14 November 1640) was commander of a company in the Swedish Army. He died in adolescence after an altercation with General Johan Banér and some other officers; he was probably poisoned.
11. Ernest (17 December 1623 – 12 May 1693), Landgrave of Hesse-Rheinfels. Married:
  1. in Frankfurt on 10 June 1647 to Countess Mary Eleonore of Solms-Hohensolms.
  2. morganatically in Rheinfels Castle on 3 February 1690 to Alexandrina Ernestina Maria Juliana von Dürnizl.
12. Christine (9 July 1625 – 25 July 1626) died in early childhood.
13. Philip (28 September 1626 – 8 July 1629) died in early childhood.
14. Elisabeth (23 October 1628 – 10 February 1633) died in early childhood.

Only six of Juliane's children were still alive at the time of her death.

=== Known descendants ===
Juliane has many known descendants. All reigning European monarchs, with the exception of the Prince of Liechtenstein, are descendants of her. Other known descendants are:

- the head of the no longer reigning royal house of Baden,
- the head of the no longer reigning royal house of Greece,
- the Prussian Field Marshal Leopold I of Anhalt-Dessau (der Alte Dessauer),
- the French Field Marshal Maurice of Saxony,
- the German chancellor Max von Baden, and
- the German fighter pilot from World War I Manfred von Richthofen (The Red Baron).

== Ancestors ==
Ancestors of Juliane of Nassau-Siegen
Great-great-grandparents	John V of Nassau-Siegen (1455–1516) ⚭ 1482; Elisabeth of Hesse-Marburg (1466–1523)	Bodo III the Blissful of Stolberg-Wernigerode (1467–1538) ⚭ 1500; Anne of Eppstein-Königstein (1481–1538)	John IV of Leuchtenberg (1470–1531) ⚭ 1502; Margaret of Schwarzburg-Blankenburg (1482–1518)	Frederick I the Elder of Brandenburg-Ansbach (1460–1536) ⚭ 1479; Sophia of Poland (1464–1512)	Philip I of Waldeck-Waldeck (1445–1475) ⚭ 1464; Joanne of Nassau-Siegen (1444–1468)	William of Runkel (d. 1489) ⚭ 1454; Irmgard of Rollingen (d. 1514)	Gerlach II of Isenburg-Grenzau (d. 1500) ⚭ 1455; Hildegard of Sierck (d. 1490)	Henry of Hunolstein-Neumagen (d. 1486) ⚭ 1466; Elisabeth de Boulay (d. 1507)
Great-grandparents	William I the Rich of Nassau-Siegen (1487–1559) ⚭ 1531; Juliane of Stolberg-Wernigerode (1506–1580)		George III of Leuchtenberg (1502–1555) ⚭ 1528; Barbara of Brandenburg-Ansbach (1495–1552)		Henry VIII of Waldeck-Wildungen (1465–1513) ⚭ before 1492; Anastasia of Runkel (d. 1502/03)		Salentin VII of Isenburg-Grenzau (before 1470–1534) ⚭ Elisabeth of Hunolstein-Neumagen (c. 1475–1536/38)	
Grandparents	John VI the Elder of Nassau-Siegen (1536–1606) ⚭ 1559; Elisabeth of Leuchtenberg (1537–1579)				Philip IV of Waldeck-Wildungen (1493–1574) ⚭ 1554; Jutta of Isenburg-Grenzau (d. 1564)			
Parents	John VII the Middle of Nassau-Siegen (1561–1623) ⚭ 1581; Magdalene of Waldeck-Wildungen (1558–1599)							

== Literature ==
- Lemberg, Margret (1994). Juliane Landgräfin zu Hessen (1587–1643). Eine Kasseler und Rotenburger Fürstin aus dem Hause Nassau-Dillenburg in ihrer Zeit. Quellen und Forschungen zur hessischen Geschichte (in German). Vol. 90. Darmstadt: Hessische Historische Kommission Darmstadt. ISBN 978-3-88443-179-5.

== Sources ==
- Dek, A.W.E. (1962). Graf Johann der Mittlere von Nassau-Siegen und seine 25 Kinder (in German). Rijswijk: Krips Repro.
- Dek, A.W.E. (1968). "De afstammelingen van Juliana van Stolberg tot aan het jaar van de Vrede van Münster". Spiegel der Historie. Maandblad voor de geschiedenis der Nederlanden (in Dutch). 1968 (7/8): 228–303.
- Dek, A.W.E. (1970). Genealogie van het Vorstenhuis Nassau (in Dutch). Zaltbommel: Europese Bibliotheek.
- Huberty, Michel; Giraud, Alain & Magdelaine, F. & B. (1981). l'Allemagne Dynastique (in French). Vol. Tome III: Brunswick-Nassau-Schwarzbourg. Le Perreux: Alain Giraud. ISBN 2-901138-03-9.
- Lück, Alfred (1981) [1967]. Siegerland und Nederland (in German) (2nd ed.). Siegen: Siegerländer Heimatverein e.V.
- Menk, Friedhelm (1971). Quellen zur Geschichte des Siegerlandes im niederländischen königlichen Hausarchiv (in German). Siegen: Stadt Siegen & Forschungsstelle Siegerland.
- Textor von Haiger, Johann (1617). Nassauische Chronik. In welcher des vralt, hochlöblich, vnd weitberühmten Stamms vom Hause Naßaw, Printzen vnd Graven Genealogi oder Stammbaum: deren geburt, leben, heurath, kinder, zu Friden- vnd Kriegszeiten verzichtete sachen und thaten, absterben, und sonst denckwürdige Geschichten. Sampt einer kurtzen general Nassoviae und special Beschreibung der Graf- und Herschaften Naßaw-Catzenelnbogen, etc (in German). Herborn: Christoph Raab.
- Vorsterman van Oyen, A.A. (1882). Het vorstenhuis Oranje-Nassau. Van de vroegste tijden tot heden (in Dutch). Leiden & Utrecht: A.W. Sijthoff & J.L. Beijers.
- Wolff, Fritz (1997). "Moritz der Gelehrte". Neue Deutsche Biographie (in German). Vol. Band 18. Berlin: Duncker & Humblot. pp. 136–139. ISBN 3-428-00199-0.

Juliane of Nassau-Siegen (1587–1643) House of Nassau-Siegen Born: 3 September 1587 Died: 15 February 1643
Regnal titles
Vacant Title last held by Agnes of Solms-Laubach	Landgravine of Hesse-Kassel; 21 May 1603 – 17 March 1627	Vacant Title next held by Amelie Elisabeth of Hanau-Münzenberg
