= Herman IV of Hesse-Rotenburg =

German noble (1607–1658)

Herman IV, Landgrave of Hesse-Rotenburg
- Born: 15 August 1607; Kassel
- Died: 25 March 1658 (aged 50); Rotenburg an der Fulda
- Noble family: House of Hesse
- Spouses: Sophie Juliane of Waldeck; Juliane Kunigunde of Anhalt
- Father: Maurice, Landgrave of Hesse-Kassel
- Mother: Juliane of Nassau-Siegen

Landgrave Hermann IV of Hesse-Rotenburg (15 August 1607 in Kassel – 25 March 1658 in Rotenburg an der Fulda), was the first Landgrave of the semi-independent Landgraviate of Hesse-Rotenburg. He was the fourth son of the Landgrave Maurice of Hesse-Kassel and his second wife Juliane of Nassau-Siegen.

== Life ==
When the Landgraviate of Hesse-Rotenburg was established in 1627, Herman took up the regency in Rotenburg.

In Waldeck on 31 December 1633 Herman married firstly Countess Sophie Juliane of Waldeck (b. Altenwildungen, 1 April 1607 - d. Ziegenhain, 15 September 1637). She was the daughter of Christian, Count of Waldeck-Wildungen. They had two children:

- Stillborn son (Kassel, 1 December 1634).
- Juliane (b. Kassel, 25 March 1636 - d. Kassel, 22 May 1636).

In Weimar on 2 February 1642 Herman married secondly Princess Kunigunde Juliane of Anhalt-Dessau (b. Dessau, 17 February 1608 - d. Rotenburg, 26 September 1683), daughter of John George I, Prince of Anhalt-Dessau. This marriage was childless.

Herman suffered all his life from a crippled foot and had to wear iron braces to support his leg. This made a military career impossible. Instead, he went into the scientific field. He became a renowned researcher in the fields of meteorology, mathematics, astronomy and geography. His treatise Beiläufige Cosmographische Beschreibung des Niederfürstentums Hessen of 1641 is among the standard works of 17th century Hessian geography. The school in Rotenburg was destroyed in 1637, during the Thirty Years' War. In 1651, Herman built a new school, at his own expense, at the address Löbergasse 2, as indicated by an inscription on the building.

After additional territories had been acquired, the Landgraviate of Hesse-Rotenburg was divided among three brothers in 1648. Herman retained a reduced Hesse-Rotenburg; Frederick received Hesse-Eschwege and Ernest received Hesse-Rheinfels. In 1655, Frederick died without a male heir, and Eschwege fell to Ernest. In 1658, Herman died without surviving issue and Rotenburg also fell to Ernest.

== Sources ==
- Historical Society of Former district of Rotenburg

Herman IV of Hesse-Rotenburg House of Hesse Born: 15 August 1607 Died: 25 March 1658
Preceded by Maurice as Landgrave of Hesse-Kassel	Landgrave of Hesse-Rotenburg; 1627–1658	Succeeded by Ernest as Landgrave of Hesse-Rheinfels
