= William IV of Hesse-Kassel =

16th-century German landowner and astronomer

William IV
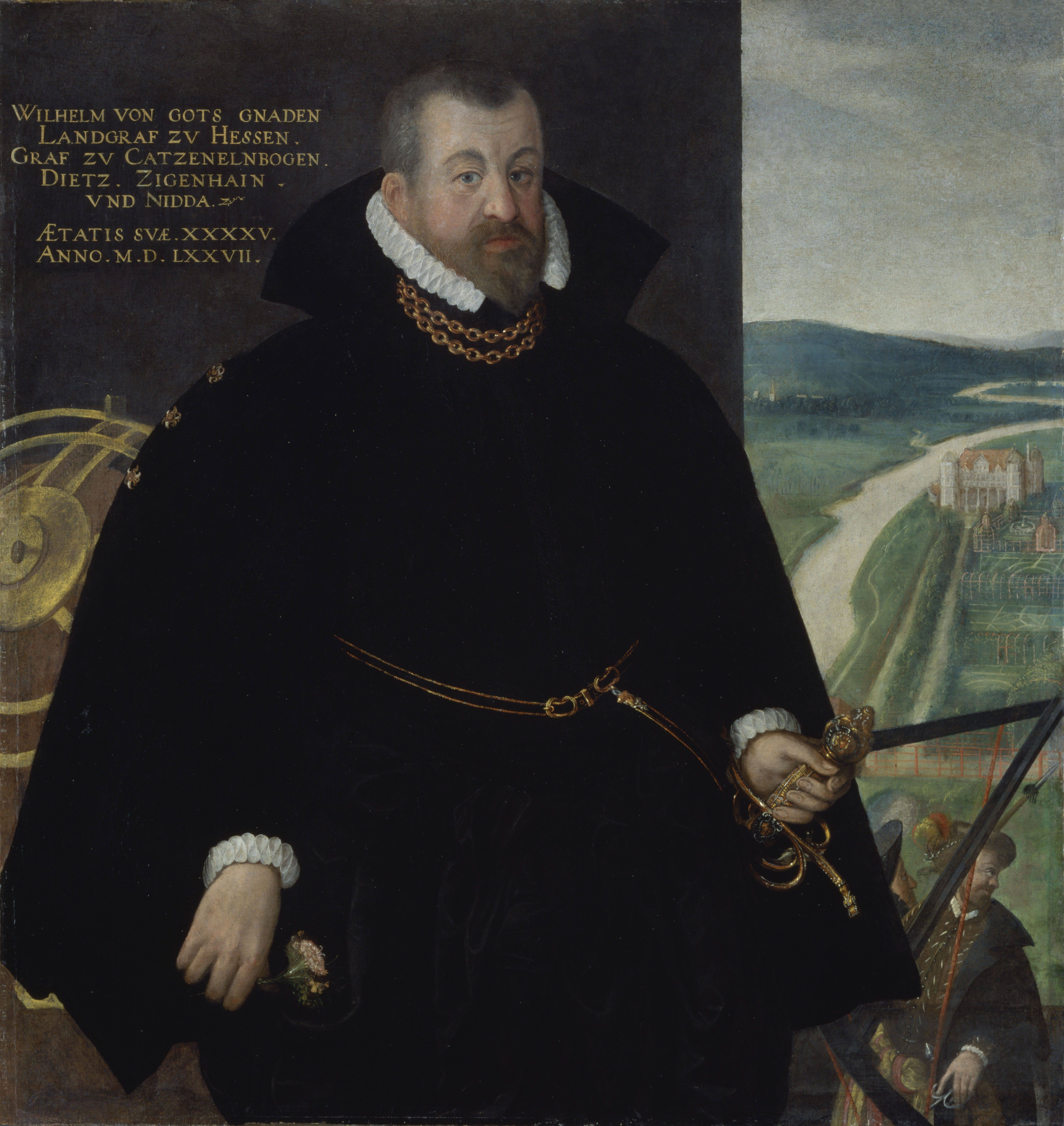
- Portrait by Kaspar van der Borcht, 1577

Landgrave of Hesse-Kassel
- Reign: 31 March 1569 – 25 August 1592
- Successor: Maurice
- Born: 24 June 1532; Kassel, Landgraviate of Hesse, Holy Roman Empire
- Died: 25 August 1592 (aged 60); Kassel, Landgraviate of Hesse-Kassel, Holy Roman Empire
- Spouse: Sabine of Württemberg (m. 1566; died 1581)
- Issue More...: Anna Maria, Countess of Nassau-Weilburg; Hedwig, Countess of Schaumburg; Princess Sofie; Maurice, Landgrave of Hesse-Kassel; Christine, Duchess of Saxe-Eisenach
- House: Hesse (by birth); Hesse-Kassel (founder)
- Father: Philip I, Landgrave of Hesse
- Mother: Christine of Saxony

William IV of Hesse-Kassel (24 June 1532 – 25 August 1592), also called William the Wise, was the first Landgrave of the Landgraviate of Hesse-Kassel (or Hesse-Cassel). He was the founder of the oldest line, which survives to this day.

== Life ==
=== Landgrave ===
William was born in Kassel, the eldest son of Landgrave Philip the Magnanimous and Christine of Saxony. After his father's death in 1567, the Landgraviate of Hesse was divided among the four sons from the late Landgrave of Hesse's first marriage, and William received the portion around the capital Kassel, the Landgraviate of Hesse-Kassel.

William took a leading part in safeguarding the Lutheran Reformation, and was indefatigable in his endeavours to unite the different sections of Protestantism against Catholicism. However, he was reluctant to use military force in this conflict.

As an administrator he displayed rare energy, issuing numerous ordinances, appointing expert officials, and in particular ordering his slender finances. By a law of primogeniture he secured his Landgraviate's land against such testamentary divisions as had diminished his father's estate.

== Astronomical work ==
William is most notable for his patronage of the arts and sciences. As a youth he had cultivated close connections with scholars and as a ruler he kept up this connection. His interest in astronomy may have been inspired by Petrus Apianus's Astronomicum Caesareum.

William was a pioneer in astronomical research, and perhaps owes his most lasting fame to his discoveries in this branch of study. Most of the mechanical contrivances which made instruments of Tycho Brahe so superior to those of his contemporaries were adopted in Kassel about 1584. From then on, the observations made in Hesse-Kassel seem to have been about as accurate as those of Tycho. However, the resulting longitudes were 6' too great in consequence of the adopted solar parallax of 3'.

=== Hessian star catalogue ===
The principal product of the astronomical observations was the Hessian star catalogue, a catalogue of about a thousand stars. The locations were determined by the methods usually employed in the 16th century, connecting a fundamental star by means of Venus with the sun, and thus finding its longitude and latitude, while other stars could at any time be referred to the fundamental star. It should be noticed that clocks, on which Tycho depended very little, were used at Kassel for finding the difference of right ascension between Venus and the sun before sunset. Tycho preferred observing the angular distance between the sun and Venus when the latter was visible in the daytime.

The Hessian star catalogue was published in Historia coelestis (Augsburg, 1666) by Albert Curtz, and a number of other observations are to be found in Coeli et siderum in eo errantium observationes Hassiacae (Leiden, 1618), edited by Willebrord Snell.

R. Wolf, in his Astronomische Mittheilungen, No. 45 (Vierteljahrsschrift der naturforschenden Gesellschaft in Zurich, 1878), has given a resume of the manuscripts still preserved at Kassel, which throw much light on the methods adopted in the observations and reductions.

== Botanical work ==
William was a keen botanist and employed Carolus Clusius and Joachim Camerarius the Younger to collect exotic foreign specimens for him from abroad, most often Italy where they had been imported from Asia and the New World. The garden constructed from these specimens, as well as those secured through other connections, was used by William's wife Sabine to create medicines, a skill which she learned from her mother Anna Maria and can be seen in the background of the 1577 of them by Kaspar van der Borcht. William also collected botanical books, including those by Dodanus, Lobelius and Clusius.

== Family and children ==
William was married to Sabine of Württemberg, daughter of Christoph, Duke of Württemberg.
They had the following children:

1. Anna Maria of Hesse-Kassel (27 January 1567 – 21 November 1626), married on 8 June 1589 to Louis II, Count of Nassau-Weilburg
2. Hedwig of Hesse-Kassel (30 June 1569 – 7 July 1644), married on 11 September 1597 to Ernst of Schaumburg
3. Agnes of Hesse-Kassel (30 June 1569 – 5 September 1569)
4. Sofie of Hesse-Kassel (10 June 1571 – 18 January 1616)
5. Maurice, Landgrave of Hesse-Kassel (25 May 1572 – 15 March 1632), succeeded as landgrave on William IV's death in 1592.
6. Sabine of Hesse-Kassel (12 May 1573 – 29 November 1573)
7. Sidonie of Hesse-Kassel (29 June 1574 – 4 April 1575)
8. Christian of Hesse-Kassel (14 October 1575 – 9 November 1578)
9. Elisabeth of Hesse-Kassel (11 May 1577 – 25 November 1578)
10. Christine (19 October 1578 – 19 August 1658), married on 14 May 1598 to John Ernst, Duke of Saxe-Eisenach
11. Juliane, born and died 9 February 1581

In addition William had a few illegitimate children. Most significant and favored among these was Philipp von Cornberg (1553–1616), William's son by Elisabeth Wallenstein. Philipp was ennobled by his father and became the ancestor of the current Barons von Cornberg.

== Ancestry ==
Ancestors of William IV of Hesse-Kassel

8. Louis II, Landgrave of Hesse
4. William II, Landgrave of Hesse
9. Matilda of Württemberg-Urach
2. Philip I, Landgrave of Hesse
10. Magnus II, Duke of Mecklenburg-Schwerin and Güstrow
5. Anna of Mecklenburg-Schwerin
11. Sophie of Pomerania-Wolgast
1. William IV, Landgrave of Hesse-Kassel
12. Albert III, Duke of Saxony
6. George, Duke of Saxony
13. Sidonie of Poděbrady
3. Christine of Saxony
14. Casimir IV Jagiellon
7. Barbara Jagiellon
15. Elisabeth of Austria

William IV of Hesse-Kassel House of Hesse Born: 24 June 1532 Died: 25 August 1592
Regnal titles
Preceded by Philip I of Hesse	Landgrave of Hesse-Kassel; 1567–1592	Succeeded by Maurice
