= Sebastian Furck =

German engraver

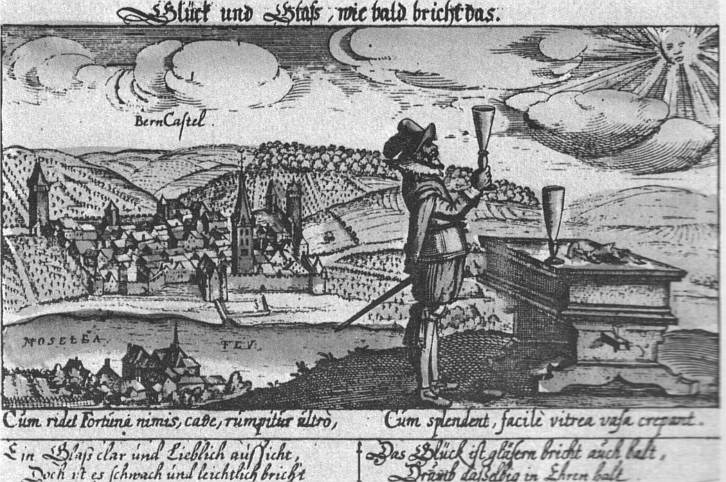
View of Bernkastel, 1634

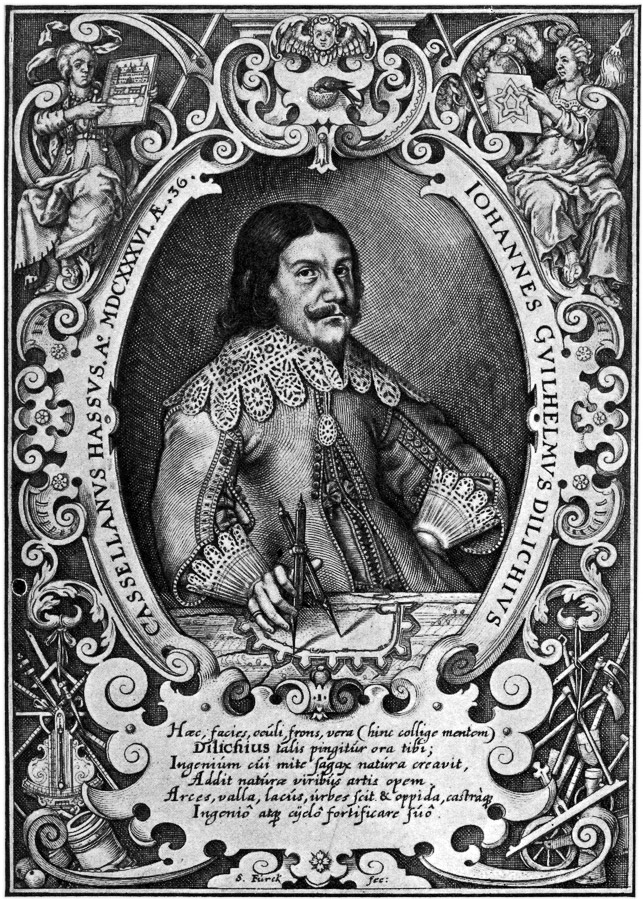
Johann Wilhelm Dilich, architect in Frankfurt, engraved portrait from 1636

Sebastian Furck or Fulcarus (c.1589–1666) was a German engraver.

== Life ==
Furck was born in Alterkülz, Hundsrück, in about 1589. In the early part of his life he lived in Rome, where he engraved some plates as early as 1612. From 1620 to 1630 he was established in Frankfurt-am-Main. He engraved many portraits and historical pieces, chiefly for the booksellers, among which are those of the Colonna family; also some plates after Titian, and other masters. He died at Frankfurt in 1666. He worked principally with the graver, though there are a few etchings by him. When he did not sign his plates with his name, he marked them with a cipher.

== Works ==
His prints included:

- The Last Judgment; after Michelangelo.
- St. Sebastian; a half-length figure.
- An ornamental Frontispiece to the works of Gul. Fabricius, dated 1646. It is etched in a very spirited style, and is signed "S. Furck, f.".
