= Daniel Blok =

German artist (1580–1660)

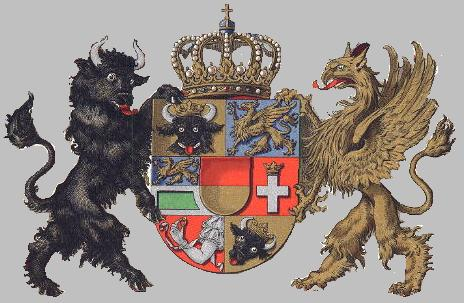
- 'Seven-section coat of arms of Mecklenburg. possibly by Daniel Block.
- Born: Daniel Blok; 1580; Stettin
- Died: 1660 (aged 79–80); Rostock
- Known for: Painting
- Movement: Baroque

Daniel Blok or Daniel von Block (1580–1660) was a German Baroque painter.

== Biography ==
According to Houbraken he was the son of Marten Blok of Utrecht. He was sent to learn the art of painting portraits from Jakob Scherer in Gdańsk. He attracted the attention of Gustavus Adolphus of Sweden, for whom he painted portraits. Houbraken goes on to say that he made a genealogical and heraldic family tree for the Dukes of Mecklenburg-Schwerin, and went from being painter to becoming courtier, but he lost everything in a fire in 1651 during the Thirty Years War. He survived and fled to Rostock, where he lived to the age of 80.

His son Benjamin Block also became a court painter. According to the RKD, Daniel Block worked in Schwerin, but he must have been active in Lübeck also, since that is where his son was born in 1631.
