= Maurice, Landgrave of Hesse-Kassel =

Maurice
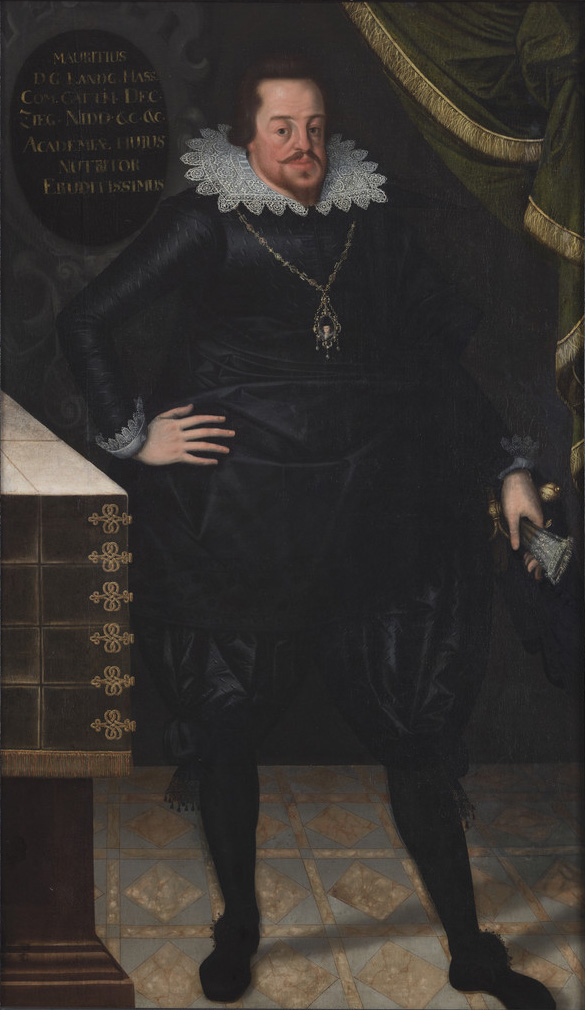
- Portrait c. 1617

Landgrave of Hesse-Kassel
- Reign: 25 August 1592 – 17 March 1627
- Predecessor: William IV
- Successor: William V
- Born: 25 May 1572; Kassel, Hesse-Kassel
- Died: 15 March 1632 (aged 59); Eschwege, Hesse-Kassel
- Spouse: Agnes of Solms-Laubach (m. 1593; died 1602) Juliane of Nassau-Siegen (m. 1603)
- Issue Detail: Otto, Hereditary Prince of Hesse-Kassel; Elisabeth, Duchess of Mecklenburg; William V, Landgrave of Hesse-Kassel; Agnes, Princess of Anhalt-Dessau; Herman IV, Landgrave of Hesse-Rotenburg; Magdalene, Countess of Salm-Reifferscheid; Sophie, Countess of Schaumburg-Lippe; Frederick, Landgrave of Hesse-Eschwege; Ernest, Landgrave of Hesse-Rheinfels
- House: Hesse-Kassel
- Father: William IV, Landgrave of Hesse-Kassel
- Mother: Sabine of Württemberg

Maurice of Hesse-Kassel (German: Moritz; 25 May 1572 – 15 March 1632), also called Maurice the Learned or Moritz, was the Landgrave of Hesse-Kassel (or Hesse-Cassel) in the Holy Roman Empire from 1592 to 1627.

== Life ==
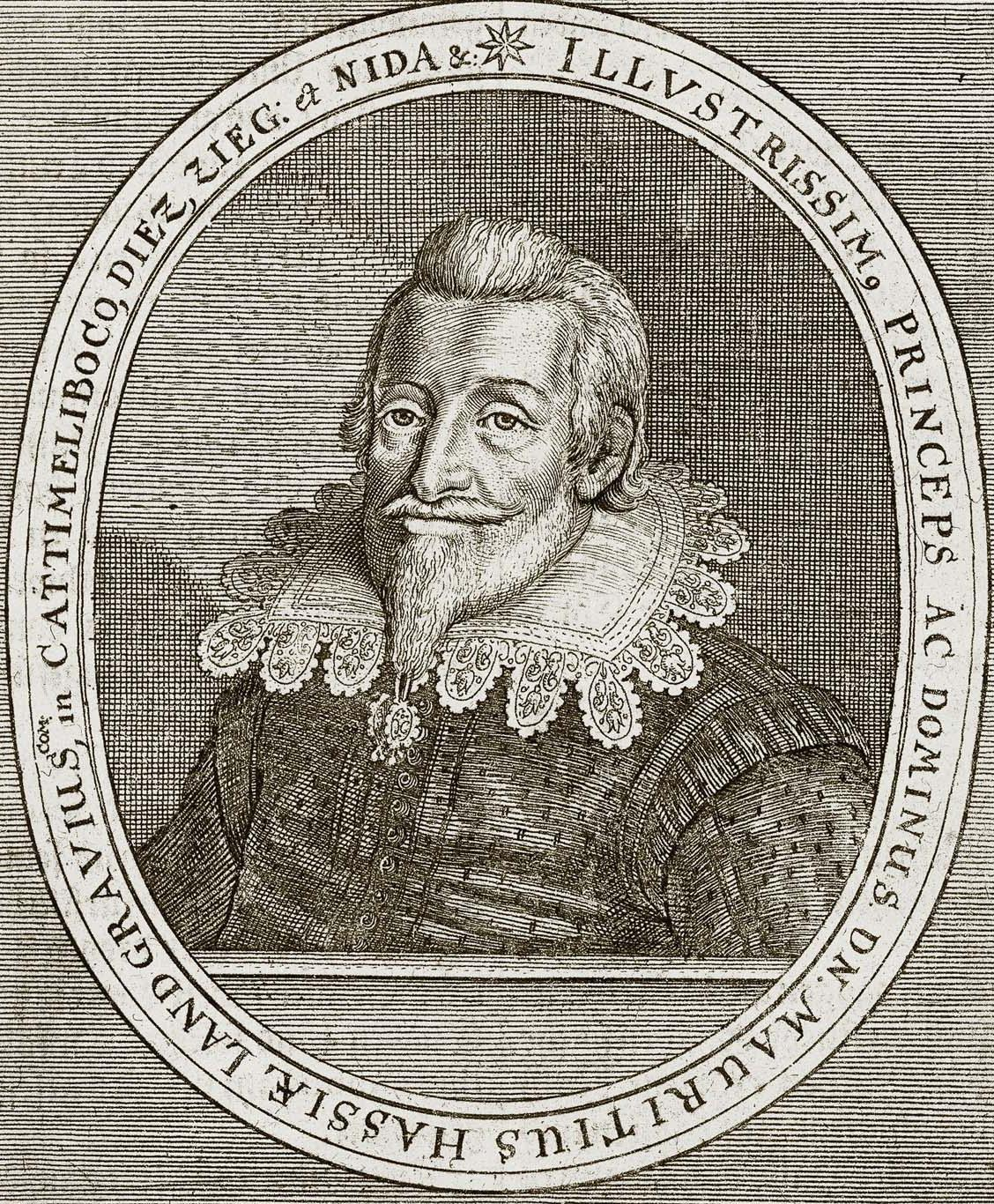
Engraving of Maurice from the work Theatrum Europaeum (1662)

Maurice was born in Kassel, the son of William IV, Landgrave of Hesse-Kassel, and of his wife Sabine of Württemberg.

Although Maurice had been raised in the Lutheran faith, he converted to Calvinism in 1605. On the principle Cuius regio eius religio, Maurice's subjects were also required to convert to Calvinism. Maurice's conversion was controversial since the Peace of Augsburg had only settled religious matters between Roman Catholics and Lutherans and had not considered Calvinists. Maurice tried to introduce Calvinism to the lands which he had inherited from the extinct Hesse-Marburg branch of his family. Such a change of faith was contrary to the inheritance rules, and resulted in an ongoing conflict with the Hesse-Darmstadt branch. It also brought him into conflict with the Holy Roman Emperor, Matthias.

English strolling players ('Die Englische Comoedianten') were frequent visitors to, and performers in, towns and cities in Germany and other European countries, including Kassel, during the 16th and 17th centuries. Landgraf Moritz (to use his German nomenclature) was a great supporter of the performing arts and even built the first permanent theatre in Germany, named the Ottoneum, in 1605. This building still exists today but as a Natural History Museum.

In 1609, Maurice played a leading role in mediating the Treaty of Dortmund, which aimed to determine the succession of Julich-Cleves-Berg. He did so with support from King Henry IV of France.

Maurice's actions (though not necessarily the Ottoneum) ruined Hesse-Kassel financially. In 1627 he abdicated in favour of his son William V. Five years later he died in Eschwege. He was not only a serious musician but an expert composer (a Pavane of his, for the lute, has several times been recorded by both lutenists and guitarists). The leading musical figures whom he supported included Heinrich Schütz and John Dowland.

== Marriages and issue ==
On 23 September 1593, Maurice married Agnes of Solms-Laubach (7 January 1578 – 23 November 1602). They had six children:

- Otto, Hereditary Prince of Hesse-Kassel (b. Kassel, 24 December 1594 – Hersfeld, 7 August 1617).
- Elisabeth (b. Kassel, 24 March 1596 – d. Güstrow, 16 December 1625), married John Albert II, Duke of Mecklenburg.
- Stillborn child (24 January 1597).
- Stillborn child (August 1599).
- Maurice (b. Kassel, 14 July 1600 – d. Kassel, 11 August 1612).
- William V, Landgrave of Hesse-Kassel (b. Kassel, 13 February 1602 – d. Leer, Ostfriesland, 21 September 1637).

On 22 May 1603, Maurice married Countess Juliane of Nassau-Siegen (3 September 1587 – 15 February 1643). They had fourteen children:

- Philipp (b. Kassel, 26 September 1604 – killed in battle or executed, Lutter am Barenberge, 17 June 1626).
- Agnes (b. Kassel 14 May 1606 – d. Dessau, 28.5.1650), married John Casimir, Prince of Anhalt-Dessau.
- Herman (b. Kassel, 15 August 1607 – d. Rotenburg, 25 March 1658), inherited Rotenburg.
- Juliane (b. Marburg, 7 October 1608 – d. Kassel, 11 December 1628).
- Sabine (b. Kassel, 5 July 1610 – d. Kassel, 21 May 1620).
- Magdalene (b. Kassel, 25 August 1611 – d. Bedburg, 12 February 1671), married Erich Adolf, Count of Salm-Reifferscheid.
- Maurice (b. Kassel, 13 June 1614 – d. Kassel, 16 February 1633).
- Sophie (b. Kassel, 12 September 1615 – d. Bückeburg, 22 November 1670), married Philip I, Count of Schaumburg-Lippe.
- Frederick (b. Kassel, 9 May 1617 – killed in battle, Kosten, 24 September 1655), inherited Eschwege.
- Christian (b. Kassel, 5 February 1622 – d. Bückeburg, 14 November 1640), Swedish colonel, died after an altercation with General Johan Banér and some other officers; he was probably poisoned.
- Ernest (b. Kassel, 17 December 1623 – d. Köln, 12 May 1693), inherited Rheinfels.
- Christine (b. Kassel, 9 July 1625 – d. Kassel, 25 July 1626).
- Philipp (b. Kassel, 28 September 1626 – d. Rotenburg, 8 July 1629).
- Elisabeth (b. Kassel, 23 October 1628 – d. Kassel, 10 February 1633).

== Notes ==
Maurice, Landgrave of Hesse-Kassel House of Hesse Born: 25 May 1572 Died: 15 March 1632
Regnal titles
Preceded by William IV	Landgrave of Hesse-Kassel; 1592–1627	Succeeded by William V
