= Ernst of Schaumburg =

Count of Holstein-Pinneberg and Schaumburg

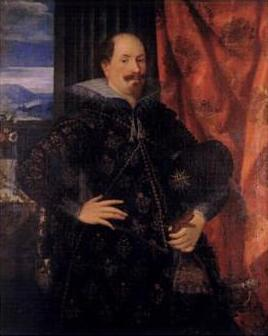
Ernst of Schaumburg.

Ernst of Schaumburg (24 September 1569 – 17 January 1622) was the first Count of Schauenburg and Holstein-Pinneberg to earn the title of Prince in 1619. However, he died in 1622 without an heir. Schauenburg-Pinneberg had been a Lutheran region since his father Otto IV of Schaumburg had been won over to Martin Luther's teachings. After Ernst's death, a Catholic Count, Jobst Hermann, received a portion of Schauenburg but he also died without children, and Otto V, who was a Calvinist, succeeded Ernst.

Prince Ernst built the Stadthagen Mausoleum for himself and his family. Today, this building is estimated as a cultural monument of European rank.

On 11 September 1597 he married Hedwig of Hesse-Kassel at Wilhelmsburg Castle in Schmalkalden. The marriage remained childless.

== See also ==
- House of Schaumburg
- Otto IV of Schaumburg
- Martin Luther
- Protestant Reformation
- Protestantism

Ernest of Schaumburg House of Schaumburg Born: 24 September 1569 in Bückeburg Died: 17 January 1622 ibidem
Regnal titles
Preceded by Adolphus XI	Count of Holstein-Pinneberg; 1601–1622	Succeeded by Jobst Herman
Preceded by Adolphus XI	Count of Schaumburg; 1601–1619	County elevated to principality
Schaumburg newly elevated to principality	Prince of Schaumburg; 1619–1622	Succeeded by Jobst Hermann
