= Peter Tom-Petersen =

Danish painter and graphic artist (1861–1926)

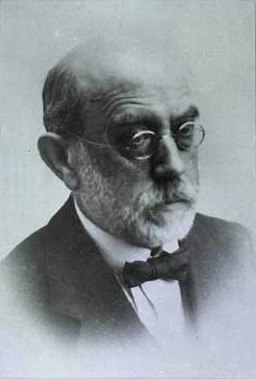
Peter Tom-Petersen (date unknown)

Peter Tom-Petersen (5 March 1861 – 27 July 1926) was a Danish painter and graphic artist, known primarily for cityscapes, interiors and other architectural paintings. His name was Peter Thomsen Petersen until 1920, when he had it legally changed to match his signature: "Tom P."

== Biography ==
Peter Thomsen Petersen was born at Thisted, Denmark. He was the son of Christian Tullin Petersen and Maren Andrea Thomsen. His father was a pharmacist. He attended grammar school in Maribo until 1876. The following year, he was enrolled at the Royal Danish Academy of Fine Arts, which he attended until 1881. His principle Professor there was C. V. Nielsen, who was primarily an architect and no doubt influenced his later choice of subject matter. After that, he studied at the Kunstnernes Frie Studieskoler and, from 1883 to 1884, worked with Léon Bonnat in Paris. In 1889, he was awarded Honorable Mention at the Exposition Universelle. In 1891, he was married and, in 1892, received a travel stipend from the Academy, which allowed him to spend a year in Italy.

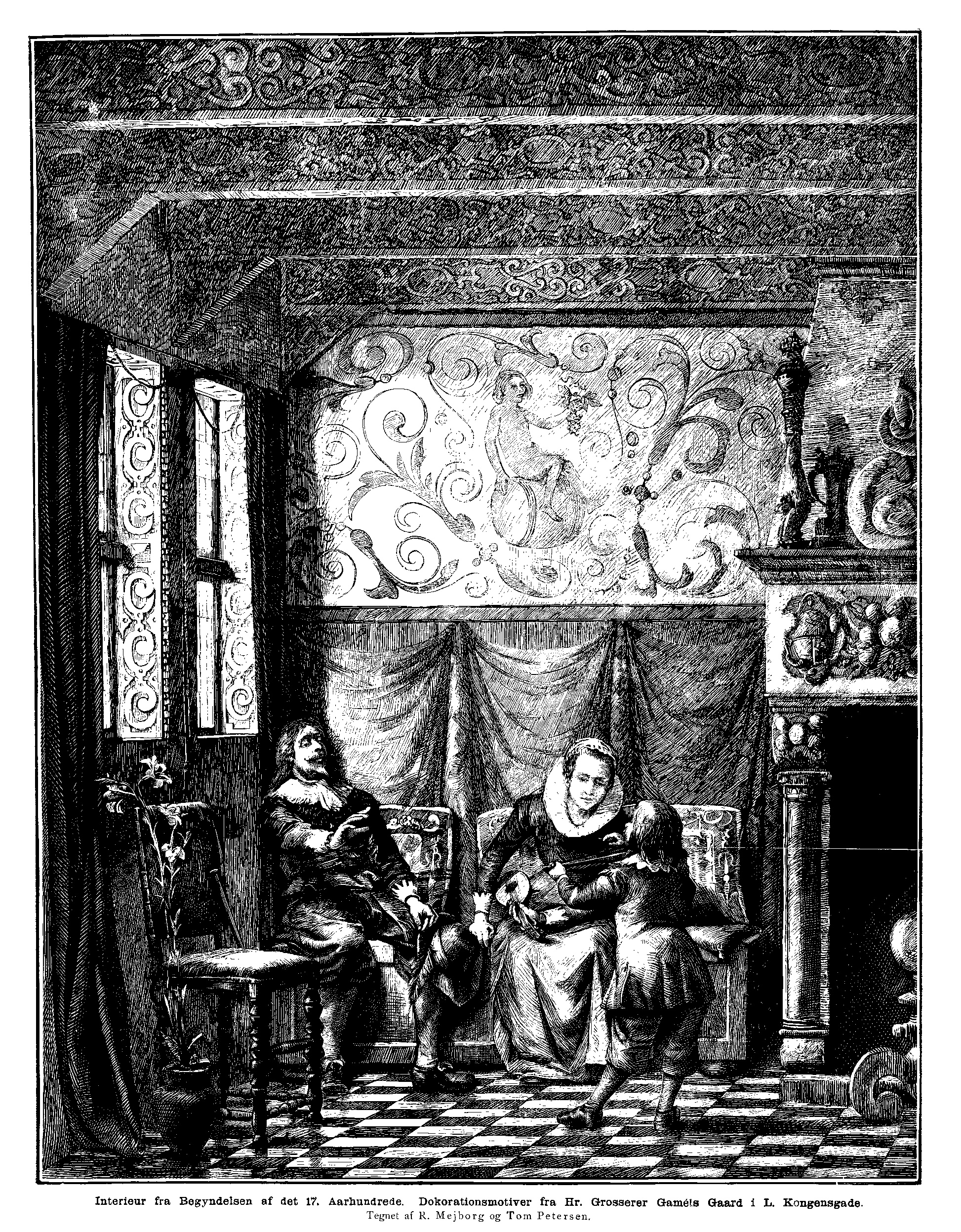
Interior of the Skipper's Guild House, from the Illustreret Tidende

In 1900, already known for his landscapes and cityscapes, he decided to devote himself to creating illustrations; eventually producing more than 300 for magazines in Denmark and Germany; notably the Illustreret Tidende. He began with old buildings and picturesque idylls, followed by colorful cities in Germany (such as Rothenburg ob der Tauber), Danish market towns and old neighborhoods in Copenhagen. They proved to be very popular and many are now of significant historical value.

In addition to his work for magazines, he illustrated Danish Folk Tales by Svend Grundtvig, The Fidget by Ludvig Holberg, Denmark in descriptions and photos of Danish Writers and Artists by Martinus Galschiøt and The Story of a Bad Boy by the American writer, Thomas Bailey Aldrich.

In 1909, he was one of the co-founders of the "Graphic Artists' Society" and served on its governing board until 1911. In 1910, he was one of the organizers of the Faaborg Museum and sat on its board until his death. From 1910 to 1915, he was also a member of the "Censorship Commission" for the Charlottenborg Spring Exhibition. In 1914, he was on the jury at the Baltic Exhibition.

In 1918, he purchased a house in Ærøskøbing where he built a studio in the garden. He died during 1926 at Ærøskøbing and was buried at Ærøskøbing Kirkegård.

== Selected works ==
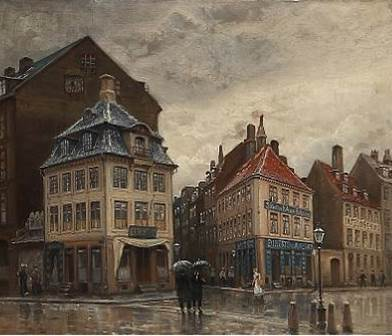
View from Copenhagen with Nyhavn 1 and the Kanneworff House on Kongens Nytorv.

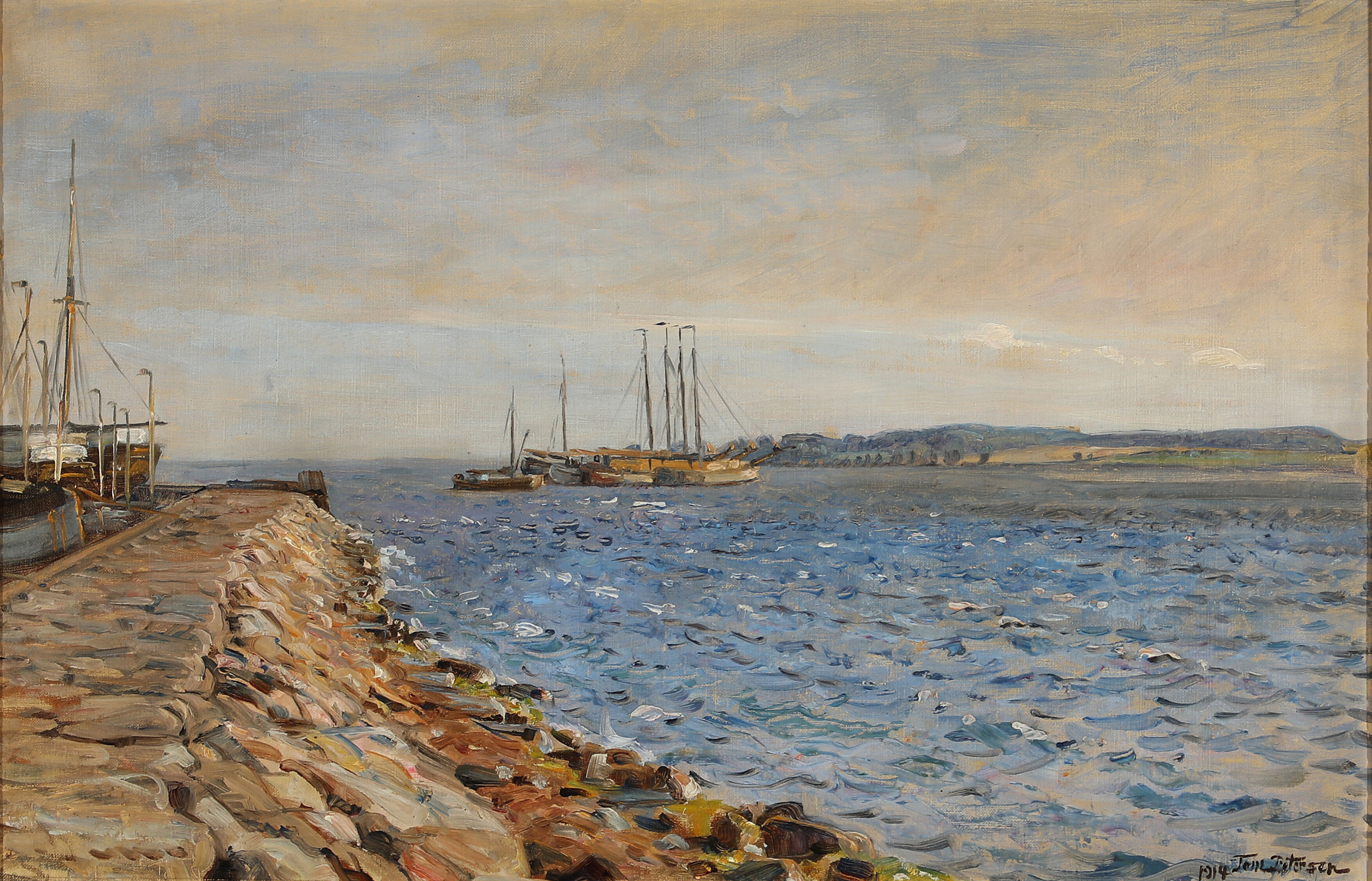
Lot from a harbor pier
(1914)

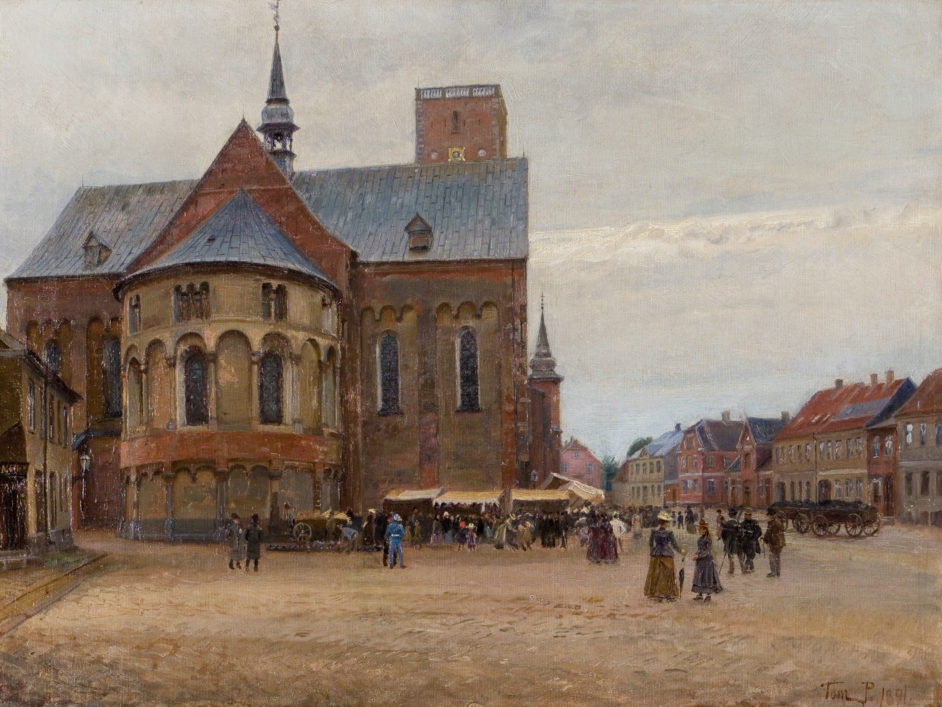
Ribe Cathedral
(1891)

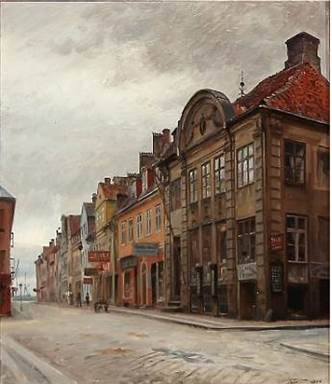
Street Scene in Elsinore
(1906)
