= Kanneworff House =

Building on Kongens Nytorv in central Copenhagen, Denmark

- Kanneworffs Hus
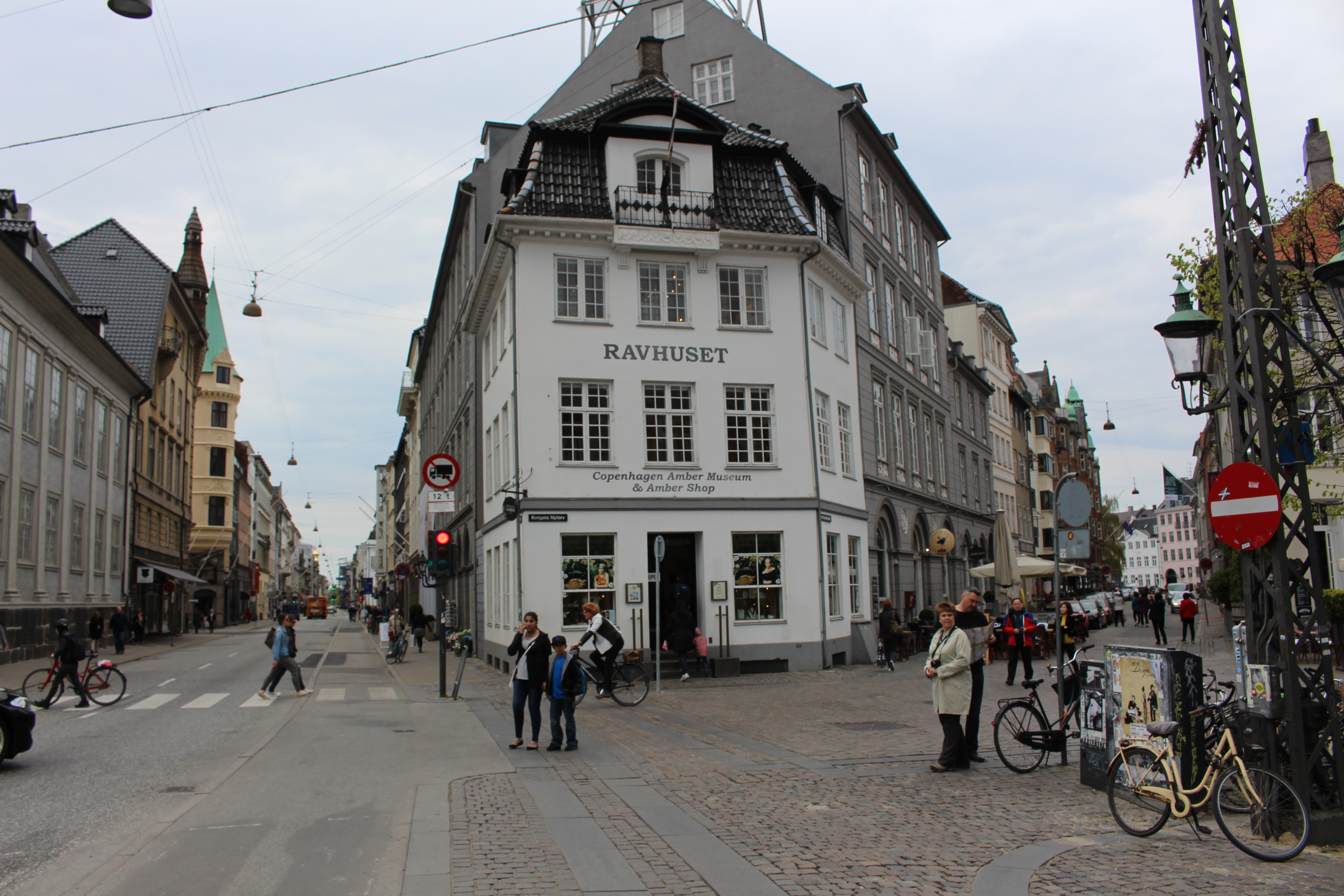
- Interactive map of the Kanneworff House area

General information
- Location: Copenhagen, Denmark
- Coordinates: 55°40′51.46″N 12°35′15.61″E
- Completed: 17th century

The Kanneworff House (Danish: Kanneworffs Hus), situated at the acute-angled corner of Bredgade and Store Strandstræde, next to Nyhavn, is the smallest and oldest building on Kongens Nytorv in central Copenhagen, Denmark. The modest dimensions and unassuming design bear testament to the fact that its construction in fact predates that of the square on which it is now located. It takes its name after Lars Kanneworff, a retailer of gentlemen's clothing who bought it in 1836, in the hands of whose family it remained for almost a hundred years. The building was listed in the Danish registry of protected buildings and places in 1918. Copenhagen Amber Museum is now located in the building.

== History ==
=== Early history ===
The property was listed in Copenhagen's first cadastre from 1689 as No. 85 in St. Ann's East Quarter, owned by stonemason Jens Andersen. The present building on the site was constructed with two storeys in the 17th century, prior to the creation both of Kongens Nytorv and Nyhavn.

=== Niels Titken ===
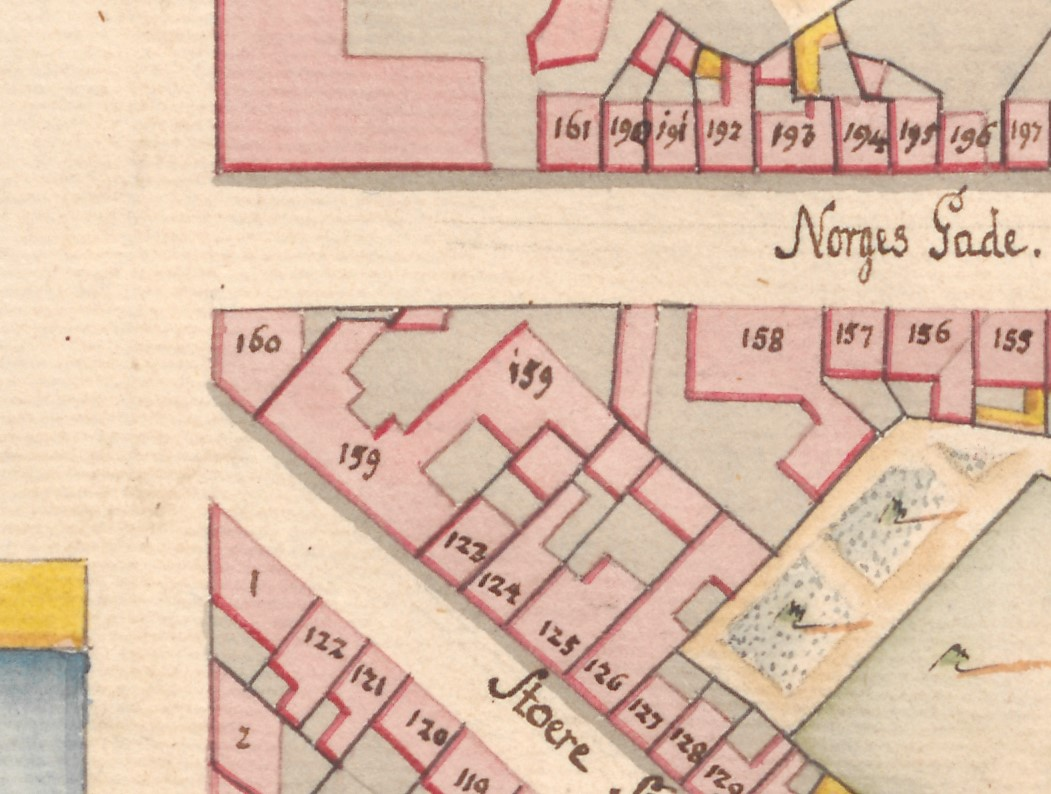
No. 150 seen in a detail from Christian Gedde's map of St. Ann's East Quarter, 1757

The property was later owned by grocer (urtekræmmer) Niels Titken (1668-1771). For a while, he served as alderman of the Grocer's Guild (urtekræmmerlauget). His property was listed in the new cadastre of 1756 as No. 160 in St. Ann's East Quarter. His property adjoined a much larger property, No. 159, owned by Jonas Baltzersen Collin (1705–1770). Collin's property consisted of two two-storey buildings, one towards both streets, attached to each other by a cross wing. The building in Bredgade (then Norgesgade) was attached to Titken's building by a long garden wall.

In 1754, Titken bought a property at the corner of Bredgade and Fredericiagade. The substantially larger Titken House (now Bredgade 60) was constructed for him in 1754–1756.

=== Prom family ===
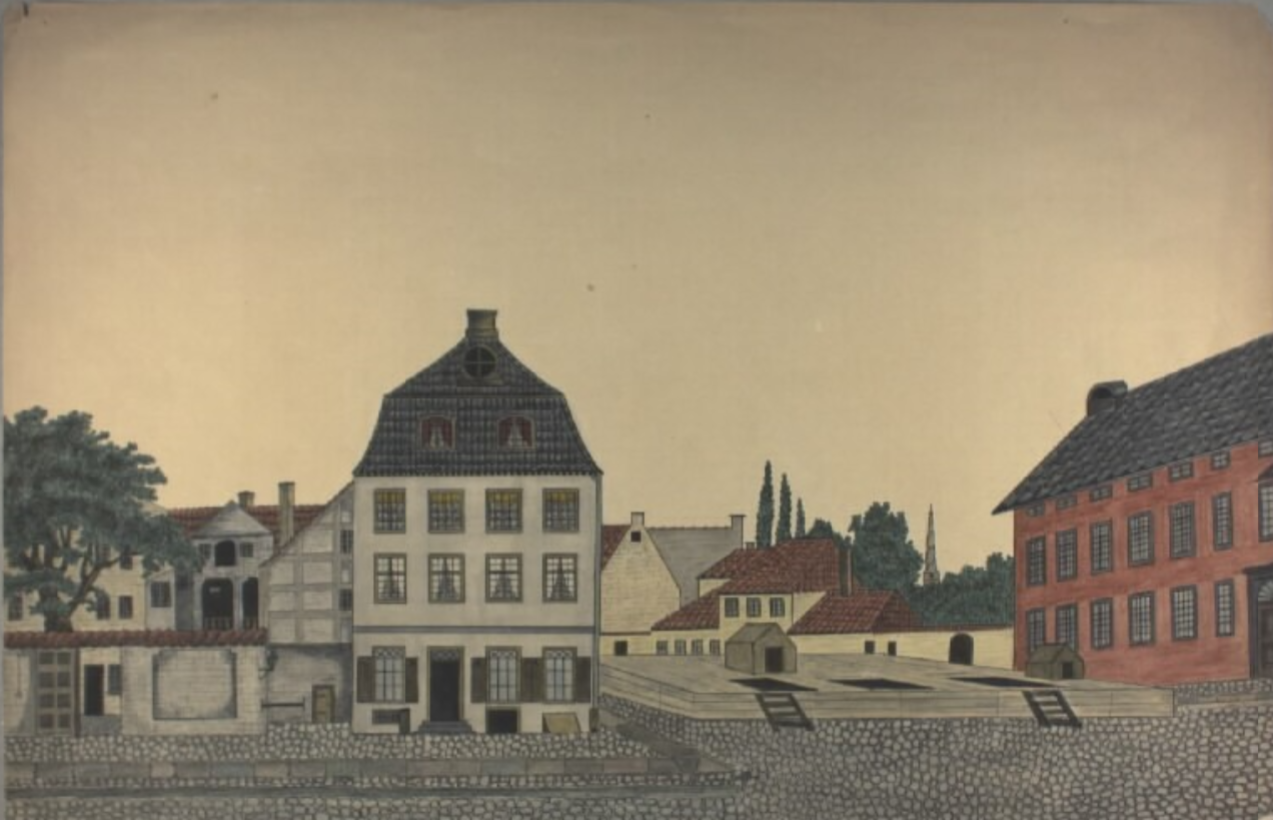
The Kanneworff House seen from Bredgade with Collin's garden wall seen to the left..

The property was later owned by ironmonger Andreas Lorentz Prom (1743–1797). He was married to Kistine Olivarius (1754–1836), daughter of provost Johan Holgersen Olivarius (1721–1774) and Susanne Margrethe Henriksdatter Hatting (1728–1757). They lived in the building with their two children (aged one and two), two male servants and two maids at the 1787 census.

Prom undertook an adaptation of the building in the 1780s, adding an extra floor as well as a Mansard roof. He died on 16 January 1797. Kirstine Prom (née Olivarius) resided in the building with her four youngest children and one maid at the 1801 census.

In the new cadastre of 1806, Prom's property was listed as No. 204 in St. Ann's Eastg Quarter. She died in 1836.

=== Kanneworff's family ===
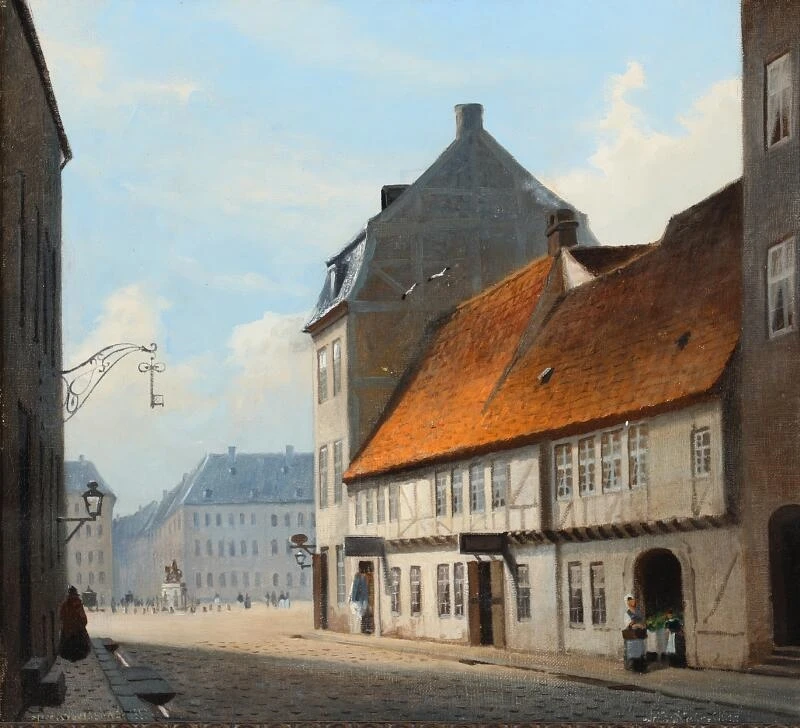
The building viewed from Store Strandstræde in 1835. The low building is the Collin House.

The property was acquired in 1836 by clothing retailer Lars Kanneworff (1790–1859). Born in Ringkøbing in western Jutland, he had initially been trained as a whool-and-canvas merchant. In 1816, after moving to Copenhagen, he founded a gentlemen's clothing business . In 1820, he was married to Cathrine Magdalene Scheitel (1798-1839). Prior to buying the house on Kongens Nytorv, he was based on Vingårdstræde.

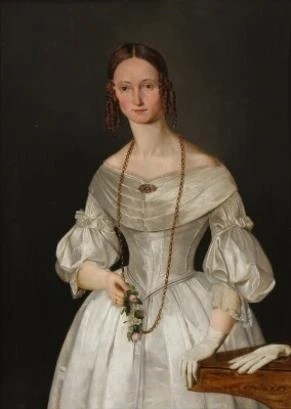
Julie Glad, née Kanneworff.

Kanneworff's wife died on 3 July 1839, leaving him with seven children. His eldest daughter, Julie Albertha Nathalia Kannewortt(1821-1886), was shortly thereafter (21 September) married to Carl Friderich Glad (1803-1862), a ship captain.

Lars Kanneworff's property was home to three households at the 1840 census. Lars Kanneworff resided on the ground floor and first floor with his six youngest children (aged five to 18) and one maid. The daughter and son-in-law Julie and Charel Friderich Glad resided on the second floor with the lodger Heinrich Peter Jacob Holm (ship captain).Laurits Hultmann, a sailor and shopkeeper, resided in the basement.

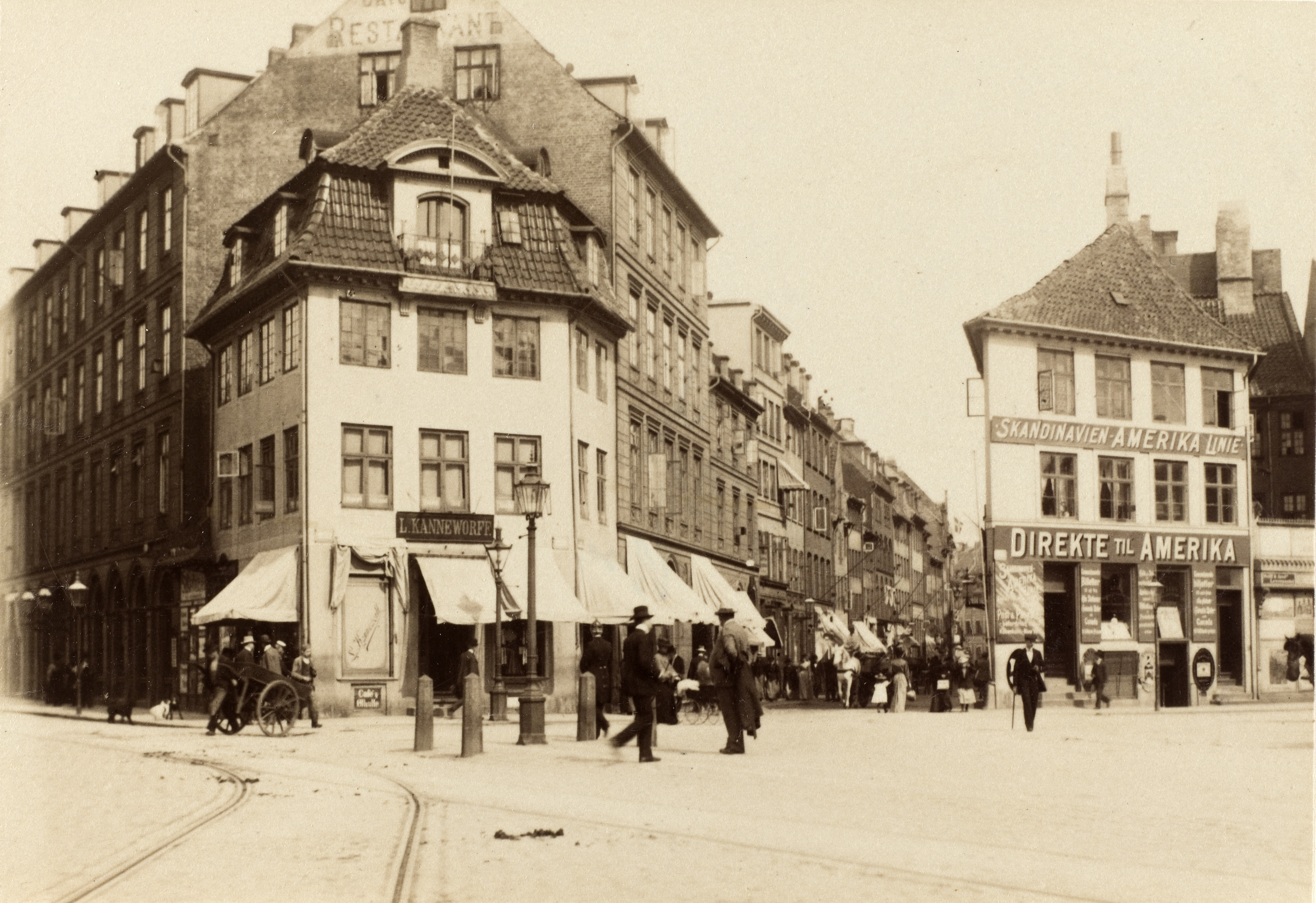
The building with the name "L. Kanneworff" written on the facade.

The building was ewfurbished in 1841. It was home to 15 residents at the 1845 census. Lars Kannewarth resided in the building with four of his children, one Madame Brauensteinm her son Carl Brauenstein, 12-year-old Louise Wessel, a maid and a seemstress. Gustaw Georg Dalin, a shoemaker, resided in the building with his wife Anna Magrete Didrichsen, tneir three-year-old daughter and musician at the 1st Infantry Brigade Julius Braunstein, Niels Larsen, a barkeeper, resided in the basement with his wife Karen Kjerstine Kaasm their two children (aged one and three) and one maid.

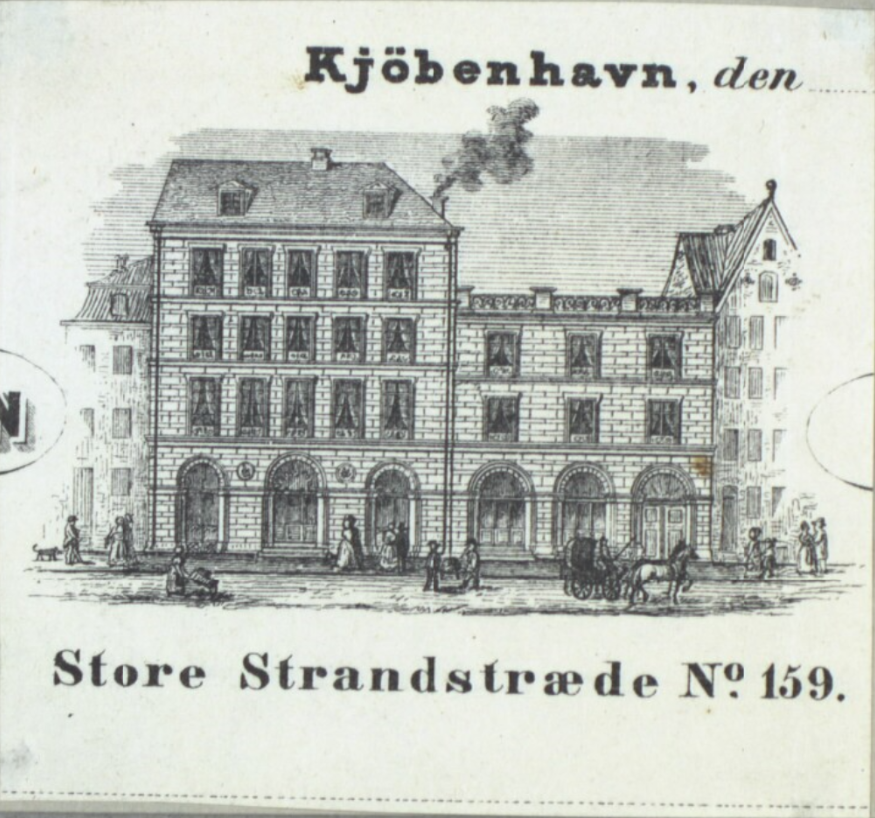
Kanneworff's house seen to the left, adjacent to Grandjean's new building in Store Strandstræde.

In the early 1840s, Jonas Collin sold the adjacent Collin House to the pastry chef Christian Frederik Bredo Grandjean. In the early 1850s, Grandjean tried to buy Kanneworff's house with the ambition of replacing both buildings with an imposing new corner building, but Kanneworff refused to sell it to him. Grandjean therefore ended up having to construct two separate buildings, one in Bredgade and one in Store Strandstræde.

Lars Kanneworff died on 14 September 1859. He was succeeded by his son Thorvald Kanneworff (1835-1897). Thorvald Kanneworff's sister Otilia (1836–1904) was married to the businessman (grosserer) Anthon Valdemar Smidt. In 1880, when she had already become a widow, she lived on the ground floor of Lille Strandstræde 18 with her five children and her elder sister Ida Kanneworff (1722-1905).

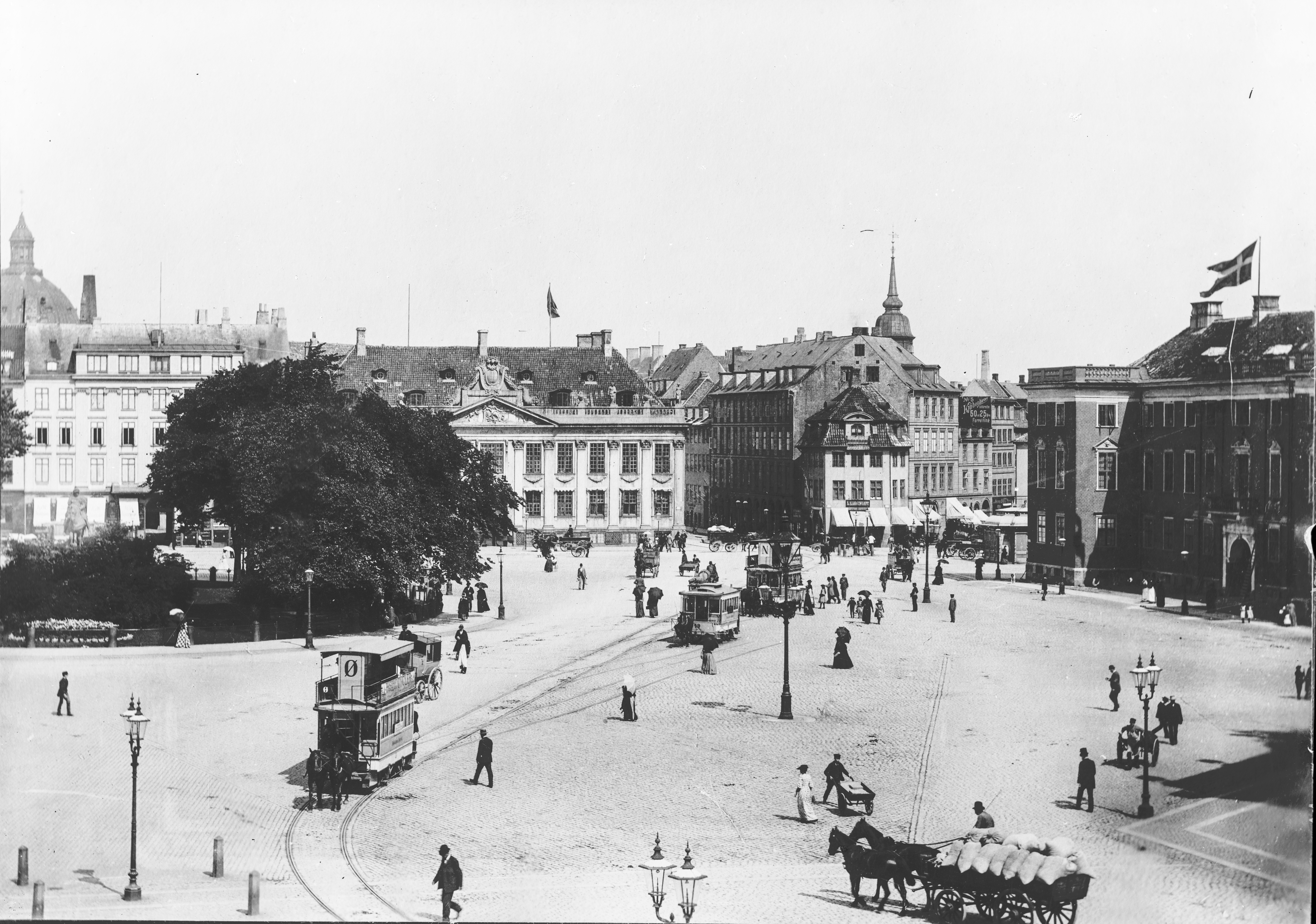
The building seen on a photograph of Kongens Nytorv by Frederik Riise.

In 1881, Thorvald Kanneworff's firm was taken over by Christian Thorstensen (1838-). In 1896, it was taken over by the founder's grandson Ivar Schmidt (1869-). His company was based in the building on Kongens Nytorv until at least 1915. The building was refurbished in 1904 under supervision of the architect Axel Erhard Petersen.

One of Kanneworff's other daughters, Fanny. was granted a dwelling in Abel Cathrines Stiftelse. On 15 September 1862, she was married to the painter Niels Lützen.

Another daughter, Eugenia Dorothea Nathalia Kanneworff, was married to the lawyer and bank Hans Cornelius Ritzau, with whom she lived in Køge. Their son Helge Ritzau (1868-) opened a tobacco shop in the Kanneworff House in 1908. He was married to Ellen Alette Margrethe Schytte. The tobacco shop was located in the building until at least the late 1910s. manager

=== Later history ===
In 1971, Bernhard Ingemann refurbished the building. In 1972, Henning Gravesen adapted it for residential use. In 1994, it was once again adapted, now for use as a restaurant.

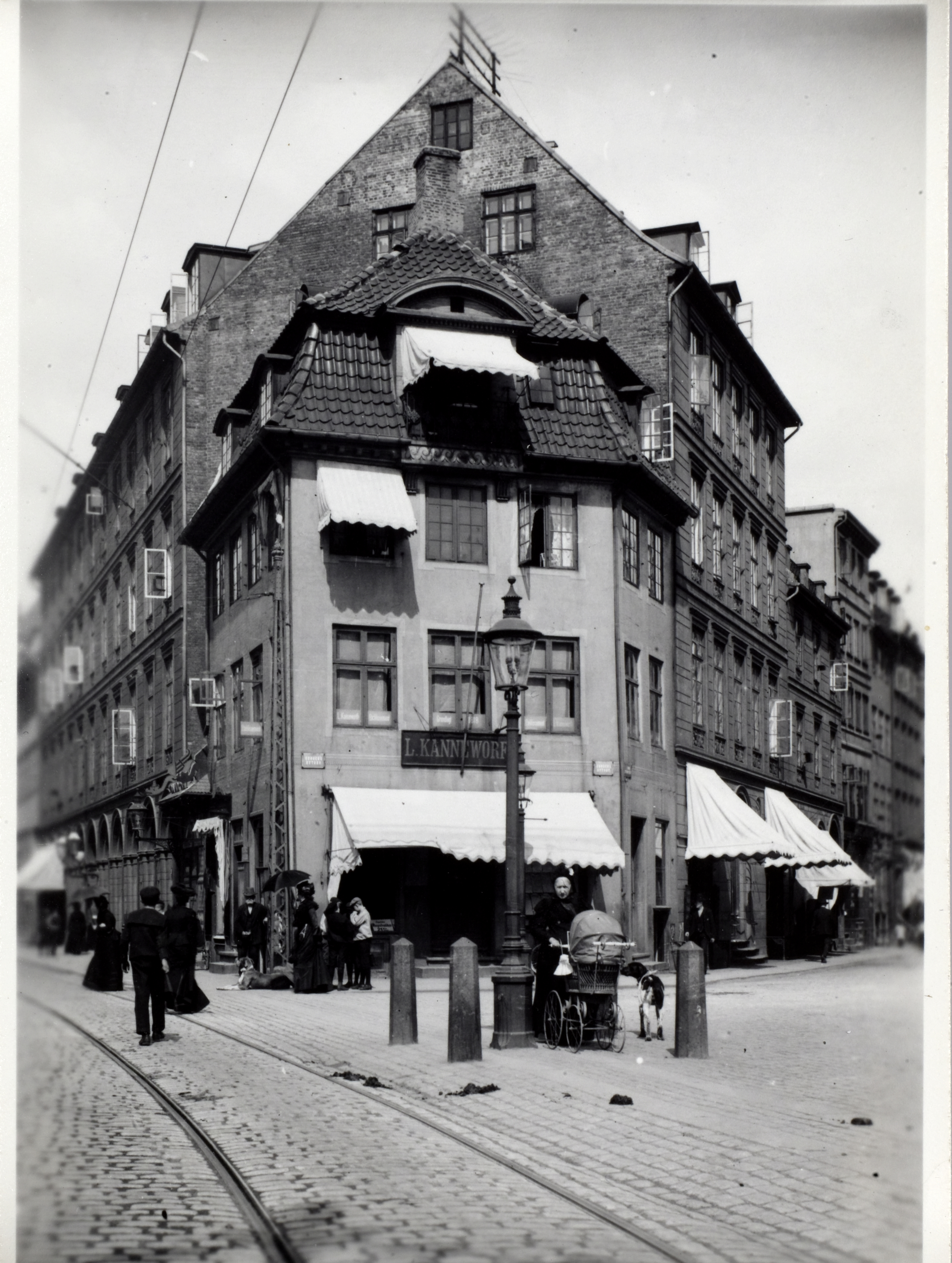
The building in 1903.

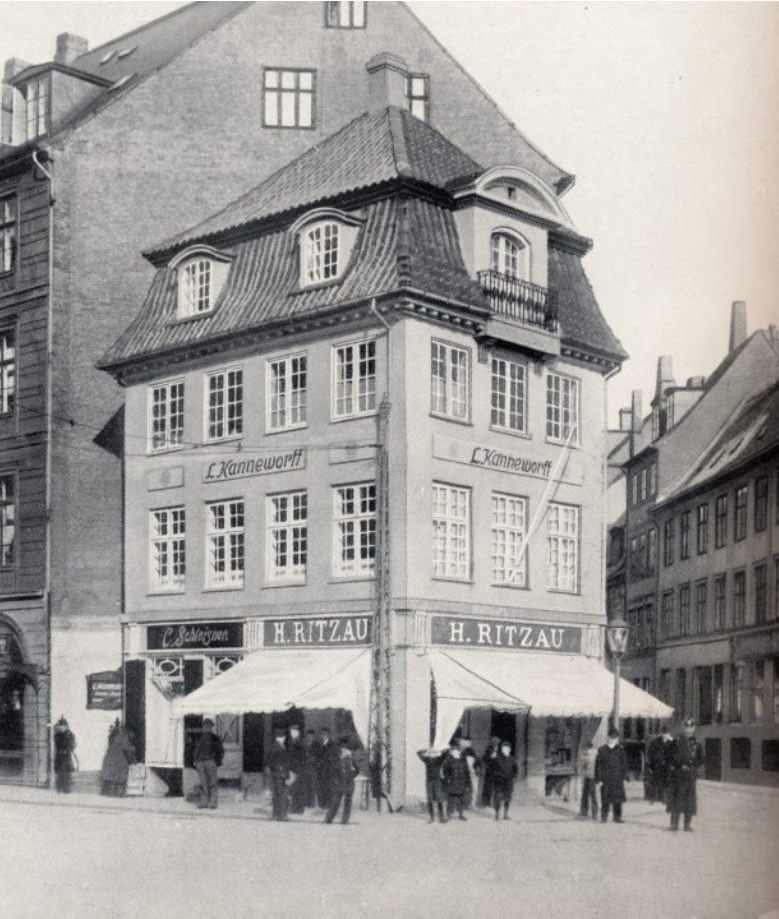
The building with "H. Ritzau" written on the facade, 1915.

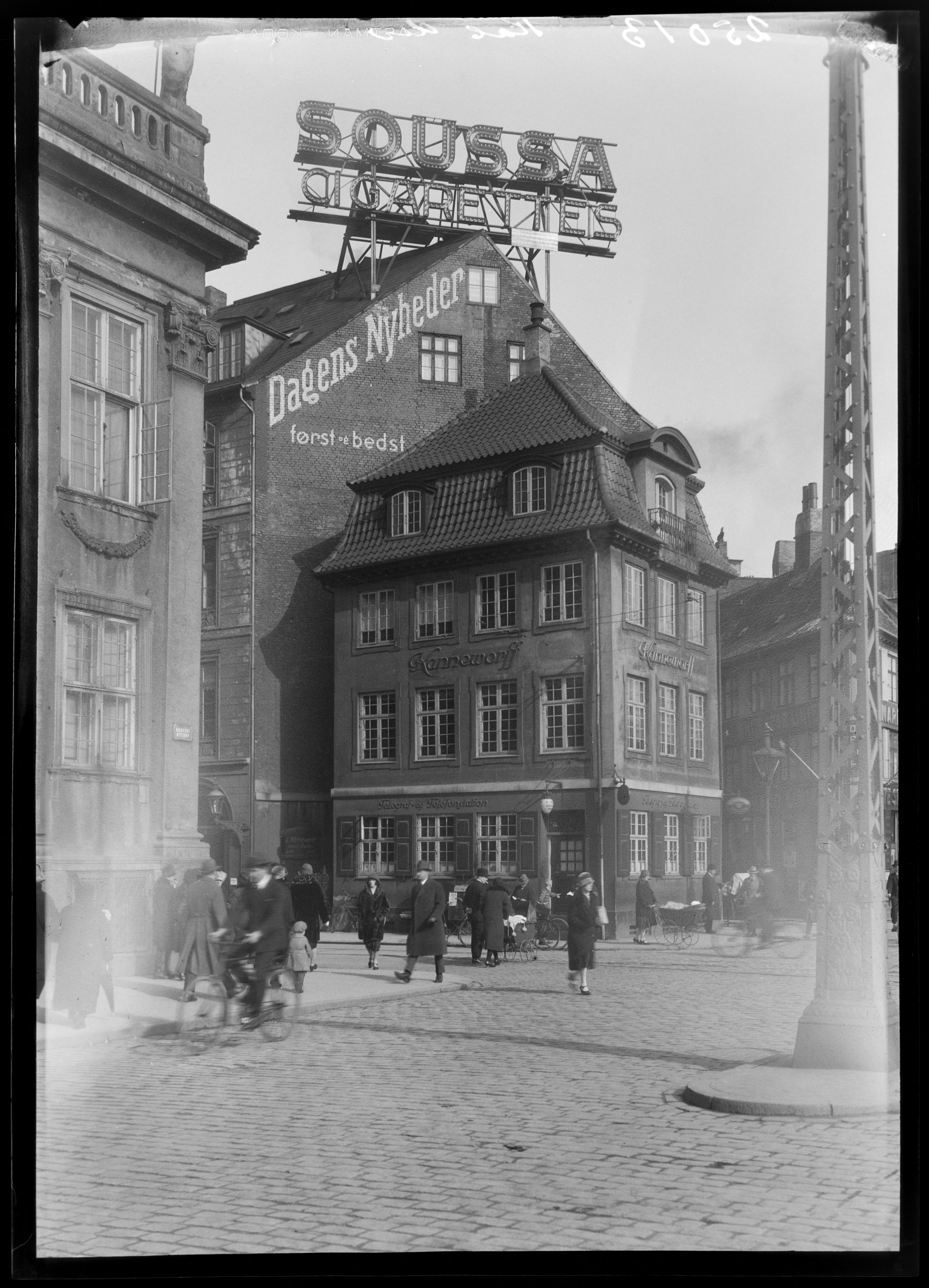
The Kanneworff House photographed by Peter Elfelt in 1927.

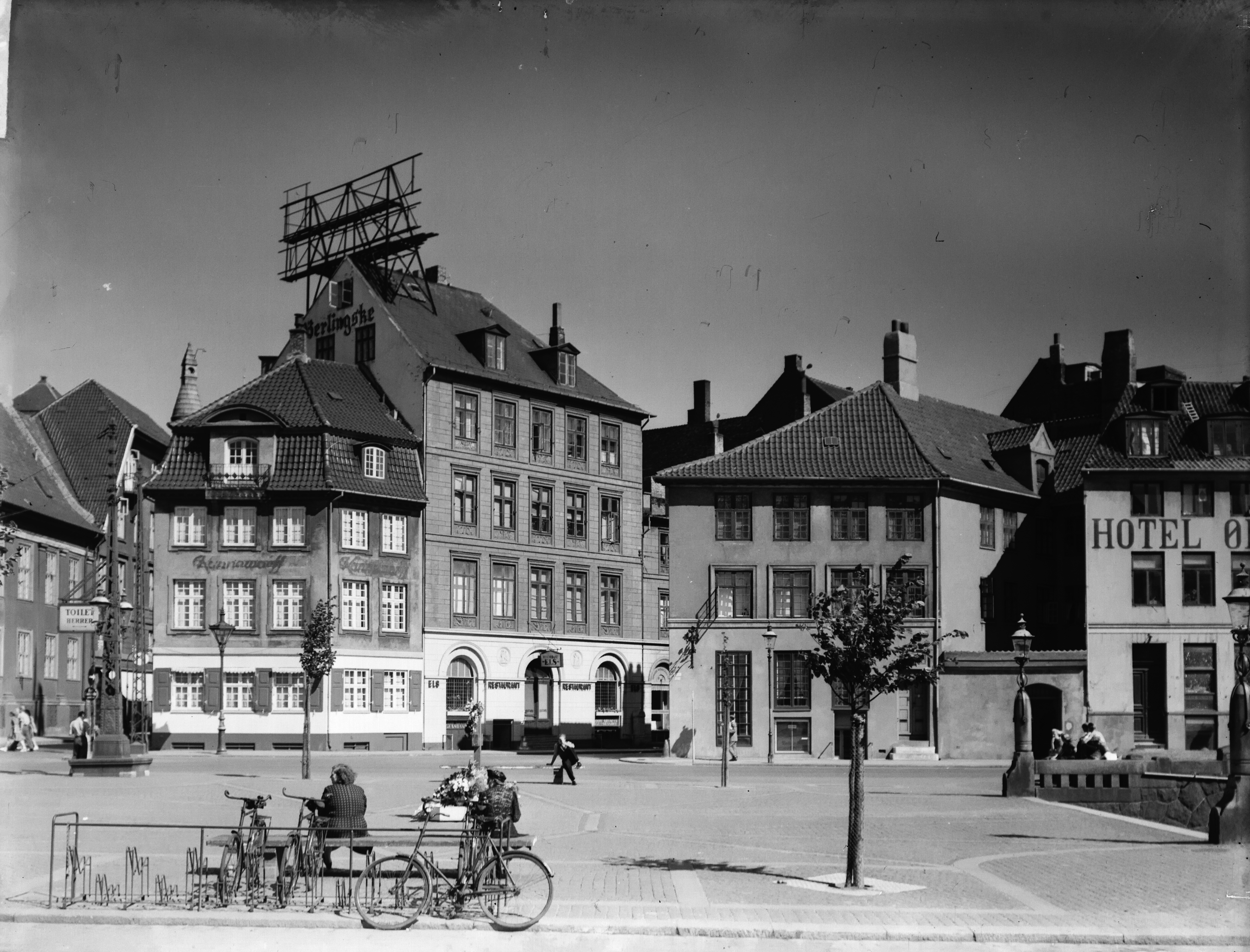
The building in c. 1949.

== Architecture ==
Situated at an acute-angled corner, Kanneworff's House has an irregular floor plan, with a three-bay-long facade towards Bredgade, a four-bay-long facade towards the square and a just two-bay-long facade towards Store Strandstrædesurrounding a central courtyard/lightwell Its current appearance is largely due to an adaptation in the 1780s which added an extra floor and the Mansard roof. Another adaptation in 1904 moved the entrance to Bredgade.

Drawing of the facade.

Floor plan.

== Today ==
The House of Ambert is now based on the ground floor of the building. Copenhagen Amber Museum is located on the two upper floors
