= Abel Cathrine =

Danish courtier and philanthropist

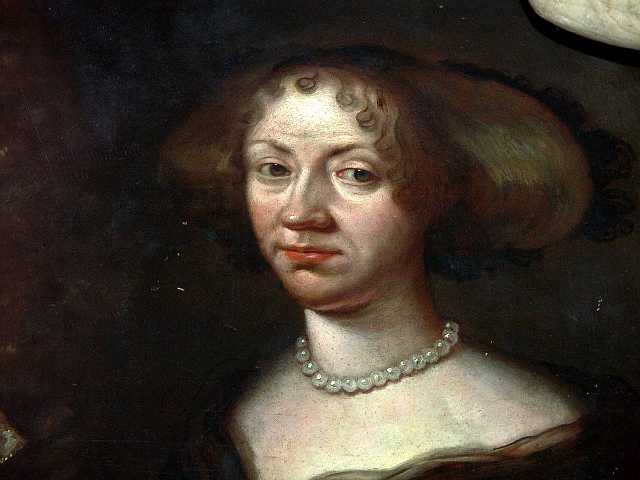
Abel Cathrine painted by Abraham Wuchters

Abel Cathrine (c. 1626–1676) was a Danish courtier and philanthropist. She was the favorite of the queen of Denmark, Sophie Amalie of Brunswick-Lüneburg, and known as the founder of Abel Cathrine Foundation (Danish: Abel Cathrines Stiftelse). Abel Cathrines Gade, a street in Copenhagen, is named after her.

== Biography ==
Abel Cathrine was born in Schleswig-Holstein in circa 1626. She never used a surname, but she is believed to have been the illegitimate daughter of a German nobleman of the von der Wisch family.

She was likely employed in the household of Queen Sophie Amalie upon her arrival to Denmark in 1643. In 1655, Abel Catherine married the court official Hans Hansen Osten (1617–1672), who was supervisor (proviantskriver) at Proviantgården on Slotsholmen and at the Copenhagen Castle in Copenhagen as well as crown manager of Queen Sofie Amalies's estates on Lolland and Falster. In addition to his responsibilities of the royal estates, Osten also accumulated a great fortune through personal investments. Formally, Abel Cathrine left her position as lady-in-waiting of the queen upon her marriage, but in practice she remained the intimate favorite of the queen who showed her many favors.

After the death of her spouse in 1672, Abel Cathrine acquired Ulriksholm Manor (Ulriksholm Slot) in the parish of Kølstrup. She also used a large part of her wealth for charitable purposes. She founded Abel Cathrines Stiftelse to provide housing for the poor in Copenhagen. Abel Cathrine died on New Year's Day in 1676. In her will, she also created a hospital at Ulriksholm and a number of scholarships. Both Abel Cathrine and Hans Hansen Osten were buried at the Church of Holmen in Copenhagen where an epitaph with a double portrait was painted by Abraham Wuchters in 1674.
