= Abel Cathrines Stiftelse =

Building in Copenhagen, Denmark

Coordinates: 55.6717°N 12.5589°E

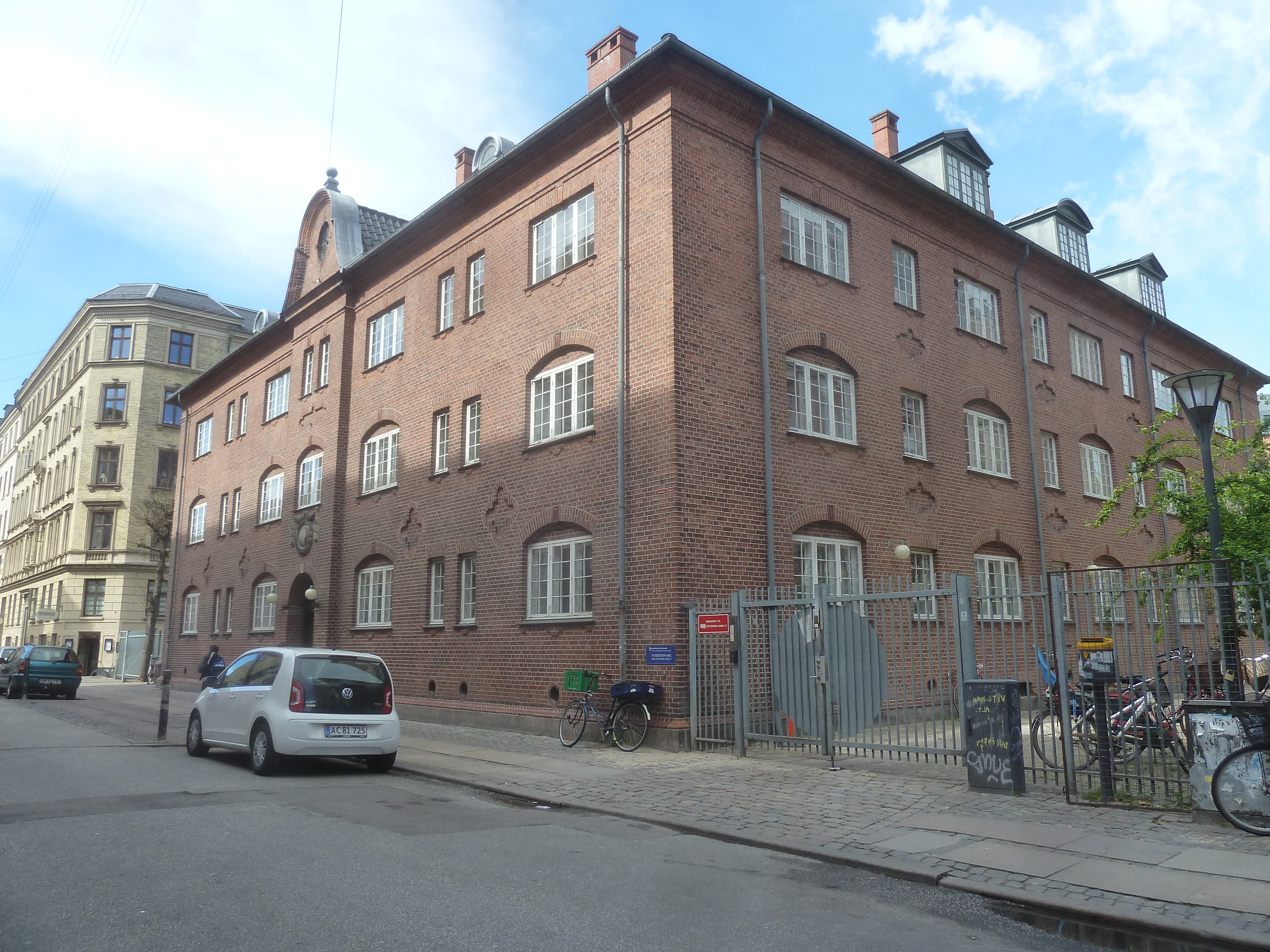
Abel Cathrines Stiftelse

Abel Cathrines Stiftelse is a listed building at Abel Cathrines Gade 13, between Vesterbrogade and Istedgade, in the Vesterbro district of Copenhagen, Denmark. It was built to provide housing for indigent women by a charity established in 1675 by Abel Cathrine von der Wisch, Queen Sophie Amalie's lady-in-waiting, replacing an earlier building in the city centre. Completed in 1886, it was designed by Hermann Baagøe Storck and is an early example of the National Romantic style.

== History ==
=== Origins ===
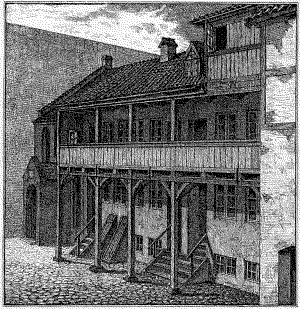
Abel Cathrines Stiftelse in Dronningens Tværgade

Presumably the illegitimate daughter of Wolf von der Wisch, a nobleman, Abel Cathrine von der Wisch was born in Schleswig or Holstein in either 1626 or 1627. She married Hans Hansen Oster who was a bookkeeper (proviantskriver) at Proviantgården on Slotsholmen in Copenhagen as well as inspector of Queen Sofie Amalies's estates on Lolland and Falster. In 1675, she funded the construction of a row of seven houses with pauper accommodation in Dronningens Tværgade, founding Abel Cathrines Stiftelse on 27 December 1675, just a few days before her death.

=== The new building in Vesterbro ===
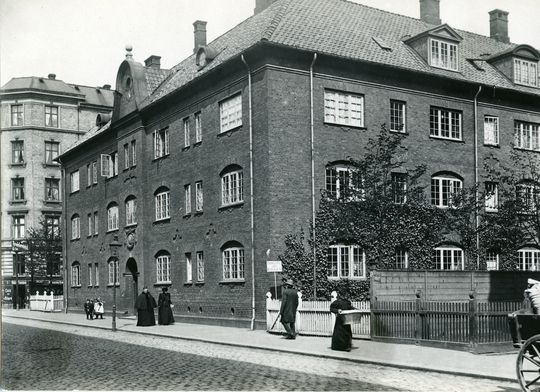
Abel Cathrines Stiftelse photographed by Fritz Theodor Benzen in 1903

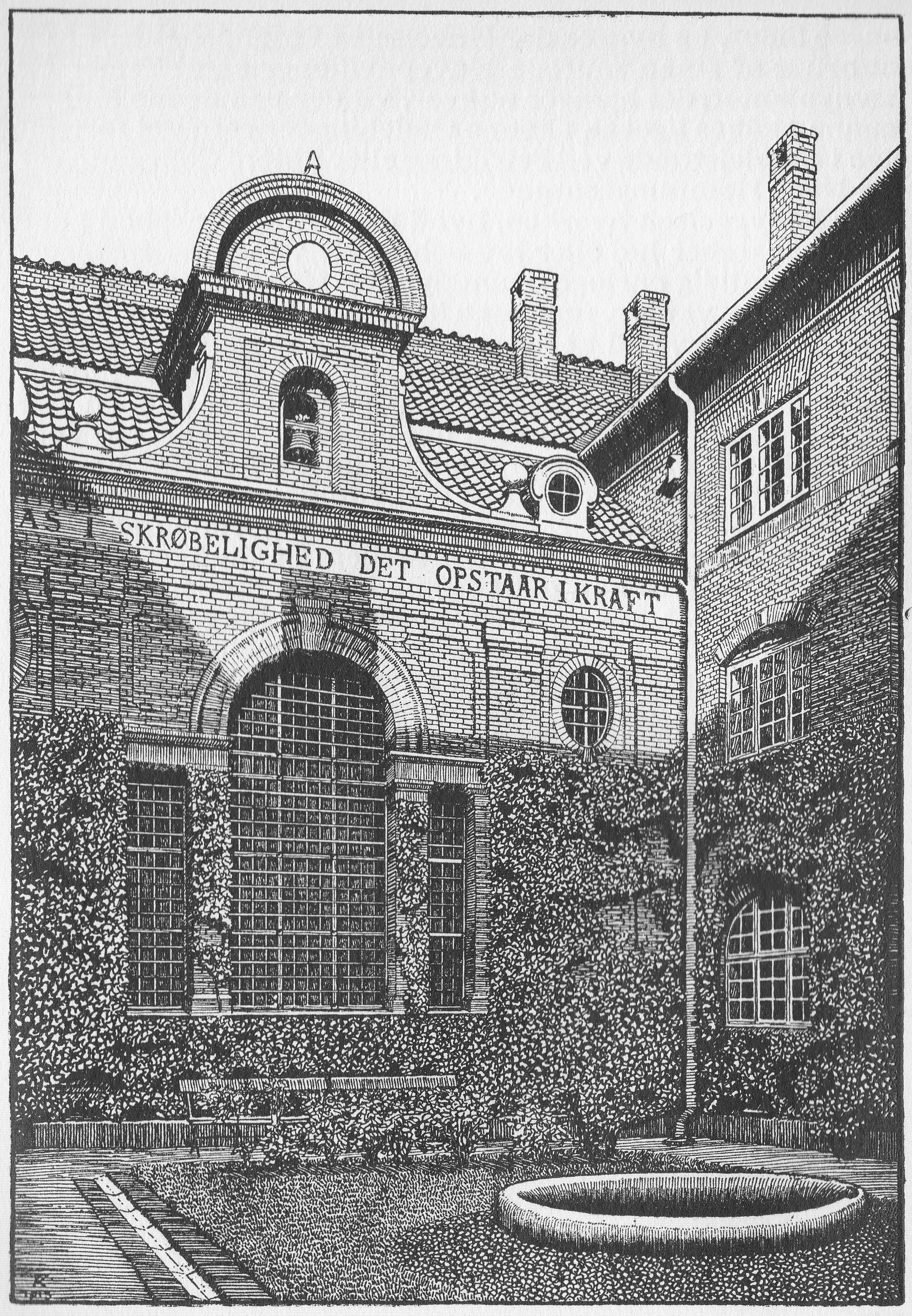
Abel Cathrines Stiftelse: The courtyard in 1914

The almshouses in Dronningens Tværgade were demolished in 1885 and replaced by a new building with residences for indigent women in the emerging Vesterbro district. The building was designed by Hermann Baagøe Storck and inaugurated on 31 October 1886. The building contained 31 residences which generally housed two women each. The north wing of the building contained a chapel.

The charity was dissolved in 1949 and the building was ceded to Copenhagen Municipality and used as a refuge for homeless people. The chapel was dismantled in 1969. Some of its inventory was handed over to the Copenhagen City Museum. The charity's archives are kept in Copenhagen City Archives at Copenhagen City Hall.

On 31 October 1981, the rundown building was squatted. The squatters left the building on 14 February 1982 and it was subsequently refurbished.

== Architecture ==
Abel Cathrines Stiftelse is a symmetrical, four-winged building constructed in red brick. It was listed in 1980. In the vestibule inside the main entrance are two plaques: one of them reads :"Abel Cathrine oprettede som enke efter proviantskriver Hans Hansen ved testamente af 27. December 1675 denne stiftelse til bolig for fattige, syge og sengeliggende mennesker. Hun døde den 1. Januar 1676. Hendes navn bevares i taknemmelig hukommelse." and the other one reads "Abel Cathrines boder var i Dronningens Tværgade fra 1676 -1885. Ved Magistratens omsorg og med kommunens hjælp flyttedes stiftelsen til denne bygning, der tages i brug den 31 oktober 1886: Guds nåde være over dette hus og dem som bor deri.".

== See also ==
- Treschows Stiftelse
