= C. V. Nielsen =

Danish architect, furniture designer, and professor

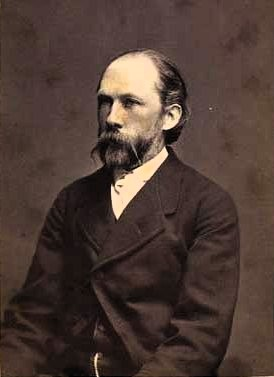
C. V. Nielsen; photograph by Peter Most

Christian Vilhelm Nielsen (26 August 1833, in Copenhagen – 26 April 1910, in Copenhagen) was a Danish architect, furniture designer, and professor of perspective. Many aspiring architects attending his drawing school in preparation for admission to the Kunstakademiets Arkitektskole.

== Life and work ==
He was born to Peter Christian Nielsen, a master carpenter, and his wife, Ane Kirstine née Sørensen. In 1844, he became a student at the Kunstakademiets Arkitektskole. He received a small silver medal in 1851, and a large silver medal in 1855. The following year, he was awarded the C.F. Hansen Medal. From 1847 to 1856, he was a regular visitor to a private school operated by G.F. Hetsch; first as an apprentice, then as an assistant.

Shortly after, he set up his own private drawing school, which graduated almost 500 students between 1860 and 1875. Most went on to attend the Kunstakademiet. In 1861, he married Caroline Jakobine Sørensen (1836-1878), the daughter of a master turner. In 1862, he became a teacher at the Kunstakademiets school of perspective. During the 1870s, thanks to a series of scholarships, he travelled extensively, throughout Germany and Northern Italy.

From 1895, he was a teacher at the local Drawing School for Women. He also taught at Sunday Schools. In 1905, he was named a Professor. In addition to teaching, he was a regular contributor of drawings to the Illustreret Tidende, and produced a series of technically precise watercolors, depicting structural features. His favored architectural styles were the Gothic and Renaissance. Some of his dissertations were published. As a perspectivist, he adhered to and developed the theories of C.W. Eckersberg. Most of his working designs were for villas and other private structures. Several have been demolished.

He was a recipient of the Order of the Dannebrog, and was interred in Assistens Cemetery. The site has since been abandoned.

== Sources ==
- Biographical data @ the Kunstindeks Danmark
- Biographical notes @ Gravsted
