= Danish National Archives =

Coordinates: 55°40′32″N 12°34′52″E

- Danish: Rigsarkivet
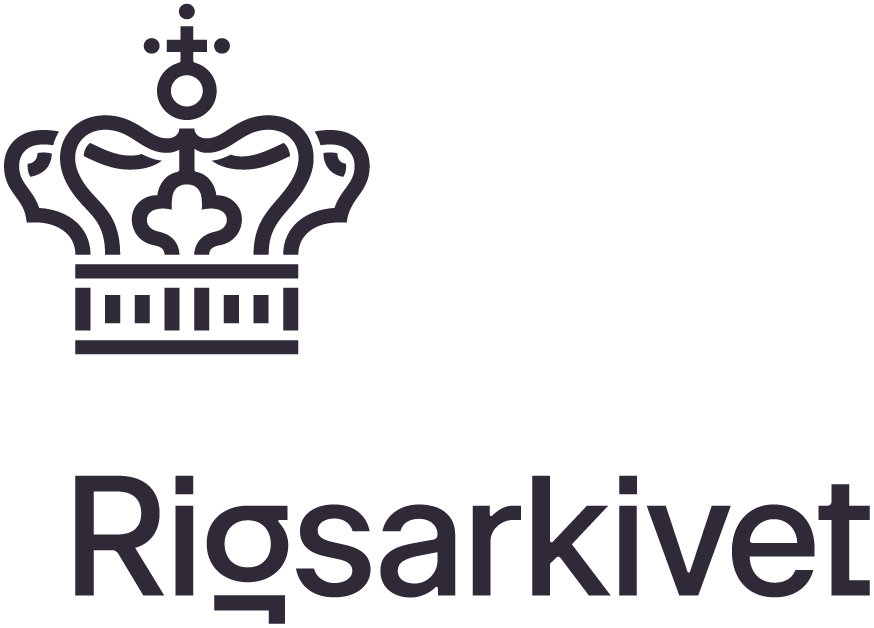
- Logo of the Danish National Archives since 2023

Agency overview
- Formed: 1889
- Preceding agencies: Gehejmearkivet (1296–1883); Kongerigets Arkiv (1861–1884); Statens Arkiver ( –2014)
- Jurisdiction: Government of Denmark
- Headquarters: Copenhagen, Denmark
- Employees: 250
- Agency executives: Karl Hansen, National archivist; Ole Magnus Mølbak Andersen, Vice-director; Kirsten Valladsen Kristmar, Vice-director
- Parent department: The Ministry of Culture
- Website: en.rigsarkivet.dk

The Danish National Archives (Danish: Rigsarkivet) is the national archive system of Denmark. Its primary purpose is to collect, preserve and archive historically valuable records from central authorities, such as ministries, agencies and national organisations and make them available to the public. The archive is part of the Ministry of Culture.

Previously the term Danish State Archives (Danish: Statens Arkiver) was used as the collective name for the archive system. In 2014 the archives were reorganised, and the name Rigsarkivet (which had previously only applied to the Danish National Archives in Copenhagen) became the new collective name for the entire archive system.

== History ==
In the early Middle ages, the majority of records keep by Danish monarchs were packed into chests which accompanied them on their travels around the kingdom. The first evidence of permanent government archives comes from the 14th century, when an archive was established at Vordingborg Castle. Soon after, Queen Margaret I established an archive at Kalundborg Castle (Danish: Kalundborg Slot). As Copenhagen had become the seat of the crown, King Christopher III established an administrative archive at Copenhagen Castle, and in 1582 all of the Royal Archives (Danish: kongerigets arkiv) were gathered in the vault at Copenhagen Castle. By 1684, the Royal Archives had been relocated to the newly constructed Rosenborg Castle.

In 1720, the Royal Archives were again relocated near the former chancery building, to be housed at the same location as the Gehejmearkivet (lit. 'secret archive' or 'confidential archive'). In 1883, the two archival institutions were overseen by the same director, and in 1889 they were officially merged by law. The resulting merger formed the National Archives (Danish: Rigsarkivet). The same law which established the National Archives also called for the formation of several provincial archives, which would be responsible for the curation of local administrative documents within the same archival system.

In the 20th century two independent archives were established in Denmark: the Data Archives (Danish: Dansk Data Arkiv) and the National Business Archives (Danish: Erhvervsarkivet). The business archives were established in 1948 in Aarhus as an independent institution. It was acquired by the state in 1962. The data archives were established in 1973; it was initially located in Copenhagen, but relocated to Odense in 1978 when it became part of Odense University.

=== Danish State Archives ===
The archival law of 1992 restructured the national archival system, so that the entire system was overseen by the Danish State Archives. Initially, the term Danish State Archives referred collectively to these archives:

- Danish National Archives (Copenhagen)
- Danish Data Archives (Odense)
- Danish National Business Archives (Aarhus)
- Provincial Archives of Zealand, Lolland-Falster and Bornholm (Copenhagen)
- Provincial Archives of Southern Jutland (Aabenraa)
- Provincial Archives of Funen (Odense)
- Provincial Archives of Northern Jutland (Viborg)

The four provincial archives held records transferred from regional authorities, like courts of law, the county authorities, the police and many other local authorities. Records from central authorities, such as ministries, agencies and national organisations, were held at the Danish National Archives. The Danish National Business Archives kept registers, documents, etc. from companies and organisations in the business sector. The Danish Data Archives, the newest of the seven archive holding bodies, kept historical and social science studies such as registers, databases and other electronically stored information.

In 2012, the Provincial Archives of Zealand, Lolland-Falster and Bornholm were disestablished and its collections were merged with the Danish National Archives in Copenhagen.

=== Current structure ===
In 2014, the State Archives were again restructured; the entire organization was centralized under one name and governing body. On 1 October 2014, the name Danish State Archives (Danish: Statens Arkiver) was replaced with the name Danish National Archives (Danish: Rigsarkivet). Today the name Danish National Archives refers to all archives within the national system, not just the organization's headquarters in Copenhagen. Under the new structure, the separate archives became reading rooms in a larger archive system. The new Danish National Archives were initially organised as:

- Danish National Archives, Copenhagen (formerly the Danish National Archives in Copenhagen)
- Danish National Archives, Aarhus (formerly the Danish National Business Archives)
- Danish National Archives, Aabenraa (formerly the Provincial Archives of Southern Jutland)
- Danish National Archives, Odense (formerly the Provincial Archives of Funen)
- Danish National Archives, Viborg (formerly the Provincial Archives of Northern Jutland)

== Reading Rooms ==
Today, the Danish National Archives includes four reading rooms: the National Archives in Copenhagen, Aabenraa, Odense, and Viborg. Until 2015, the archives also had a reading room in Aarhus; its collections have since been moved to Viborg.

=== Danish National Archives, Copenhagen ===
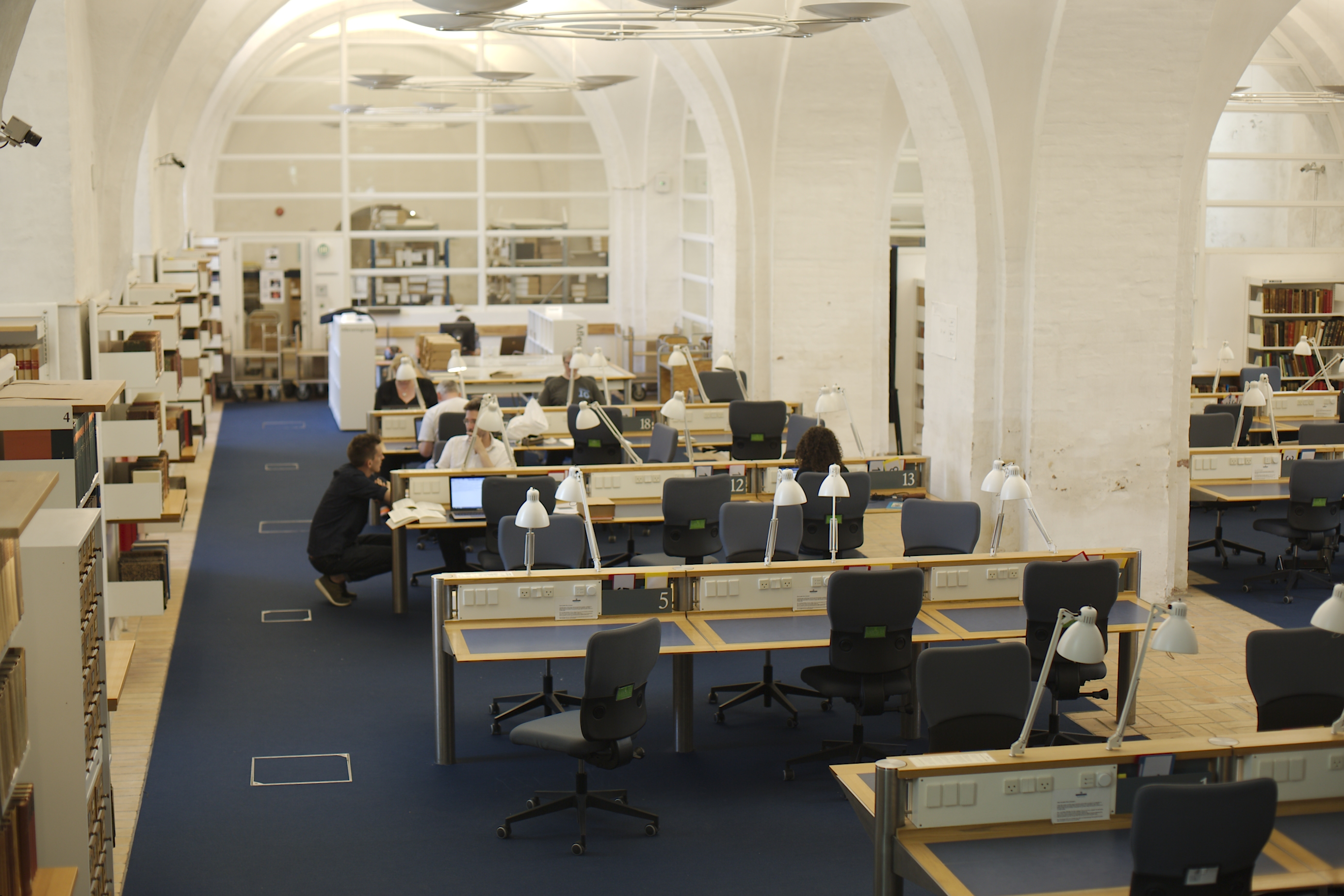
The reading room at the national archive in Copenhagen, 2013.

The archive was founded in 1889 out of two older national archives, Gehejmearkivet (1296–1883) and Kongerigets arkiv (1861–1884). In 2012 the collections of the Provincial Archives of Zealand, Lolland-Falster and Bornholm were merged into the Danish National Archives. In 2014, the Danish National Archives was renamed Danish National Archives, Copenhagen and the term Danish National Archives came to represent all of the former Danish State Archives collectively. Today, the headquarters of the Danish National Archives, Copenhagen are located at Proviantgården, next to Christiansborg Palace on Slotsholmen. Copenhagen reading room is also located at Proviantgården and is open to the public. A new purpose-built storage building was opened in 2009 at Kalvebod Brygge. It was designed by PLH Arkitekter.

The Danish National Archives, Copenhagen holds the archives of the Danish overseas trading companies, including the archives of the Danish East India Company, the Danish Asiatic Company, the Danish West India and Guinea Company, and the Danish West India Trading Company, a collection which reflects Denmark's relations with foreign countries such as the European States, Russia, Turkey, North African states and the American states. The archives of the Danish overseas trading companies were inscribed on UNESCO’s Memory of the World Register in 1997.

The Sound Toll Records, which provide detailed information about every ship and cargo that entered the Baltic and departed from the Baltic through the Danish straits starting in the 15th century, are held at the Danish National Archives and in 2007, the collection was inscribed on the Memory of the World Register.

The documents are stored on electrically powered mobile shelving – double-sided shelves, which are pushed together so that there is no aisle between them. A large handle on the end of each shelf allows them to be moved along tracks in the floor to create an aisle when needed. The units have a small AC or DC motor hidden in the base that automatically moves the units when a single button is pressed.

=== Danish National Archives, Odense ===
The Provincial Archives of Funen (Danish: Landsarkivet for Fyn) first opened in Odense on 1 November 1893. The first visitor came two weeks later. The archives in Odense were the second of the three provincial archives envisioned in the first Danish archive law of 30 March 1889. They accepted archival material from state authorities, local authorities and individuals within the geographical area of the former Funen County.

In 2014, the Provincial Archives were renamed as the Danish National Archives, Odense as part of the reorganisation of the Danish archival system. Prior to the system's reorganisation, the Provincial Archives of Funen received approximately 10,000 visitors annually, and it contained approximately 20 km of archival material in its collection.

=== Danish National Archives, Aarhus ===
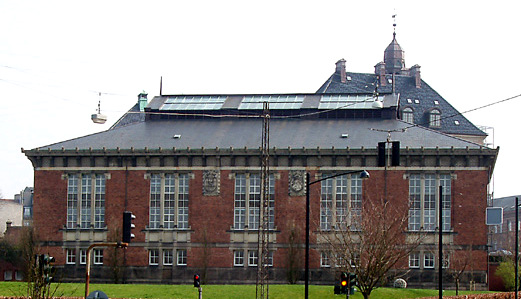
Former Danish National Business Archives.

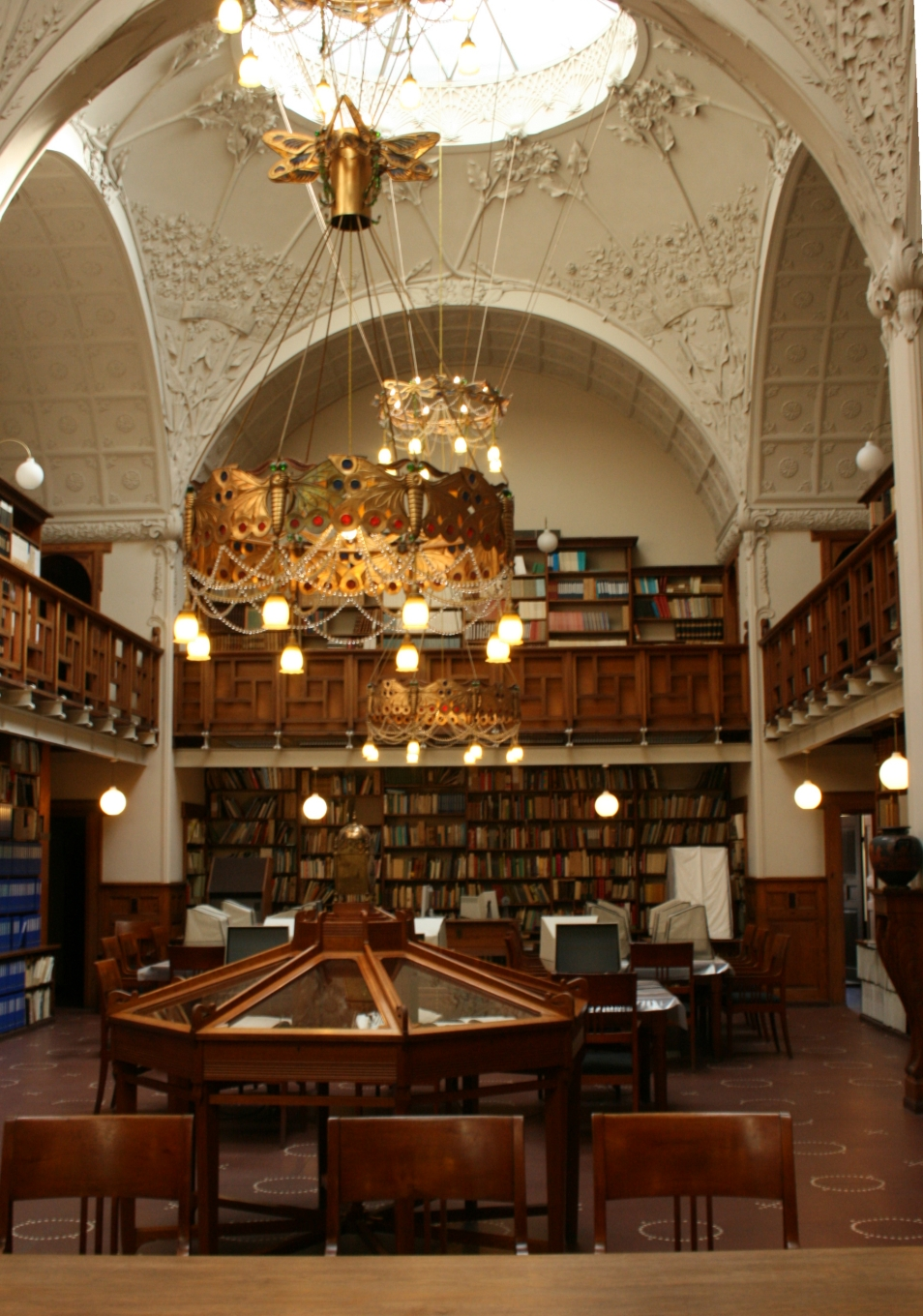
The former great hall and reading room at the national archive in Aarhus

Prior to 2014, the archives in Aarhus were a separate branch of the Danish State Archives, known as the Danish National Business Archives . They collected source material about Danish business development through time. Private companies and organizations were not obligated to supply information so collection happened on a voluntary basis through negotiations and agreements for voluntary submissions. The oldest material is from the 1500s, while the majority from the period of 1850–1950. The collection consisted of about 7000 archives from companies from all sectors of the economy. The archival database Daisy continues to contain the registries over the former collections of the Business Archive, now a part of the Danish National Archives.

The business archive was established as an independent institution in 1948. In 1968 it was taken over by the state with a special law and in 1992 it became part of the State Archives. Before the archives moved to the present building in 1962 the archives were kept in the basement under the City Hall between 1948 and 1950, then under the university building until 1956 and then in the buildings of a former railway station of the defunct Aarhus-Hammel line.

In September 2014, it was announced that the State Archives would move the Business Archives to Viborg and merge it with the Provincial Archives of Northern Jutland in 2015–2016.
