= Titken House =

- Titkens Gård
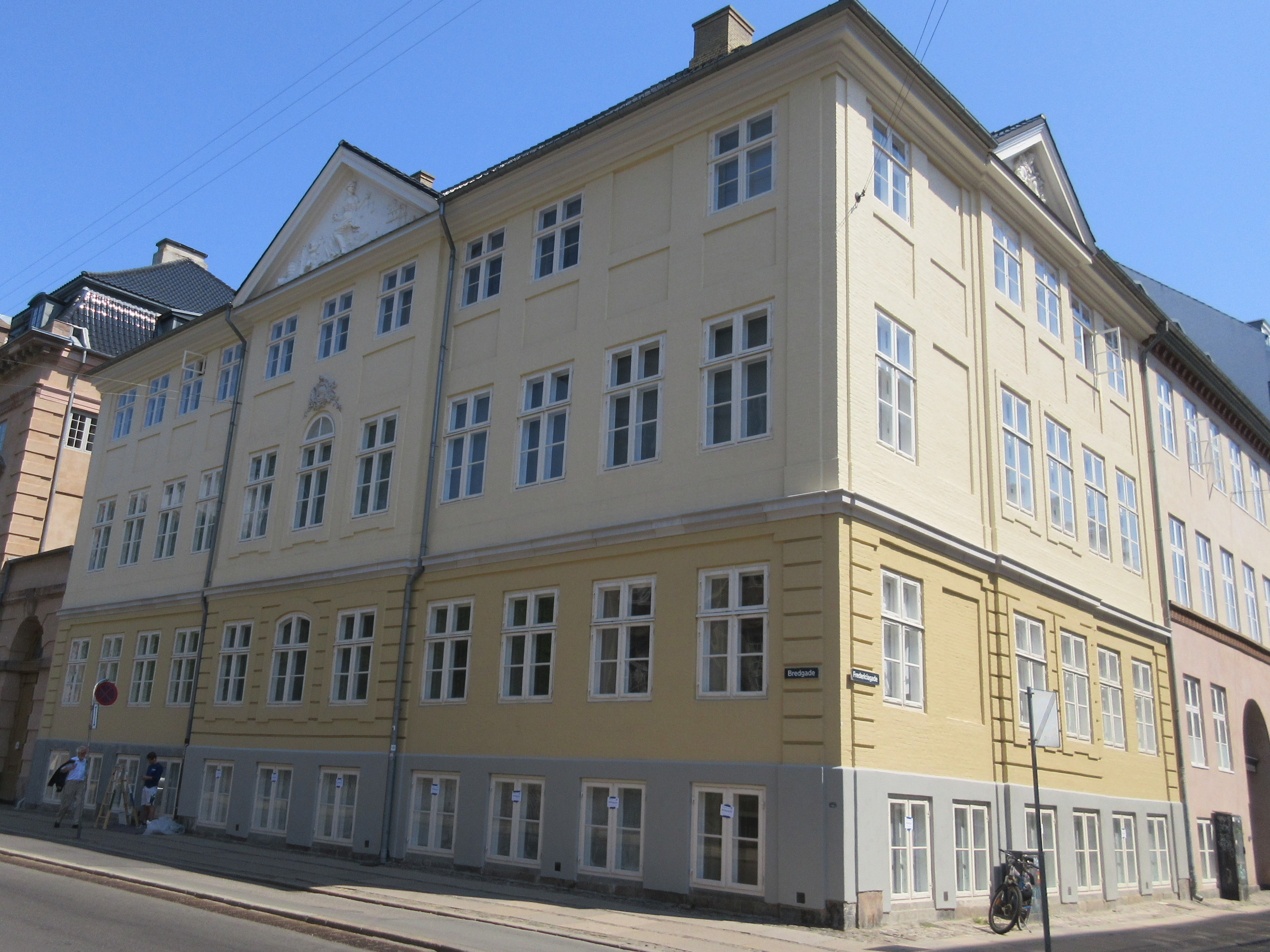
- Interactive map of Titken House

General information
- Architectural style: Baroque
- Location: Bredgade 60, Copenhagen, Denmark
- Coordinates: 55°41′8.59″N 12°35′29.82″E
- Completed: 1756

Design and construction
- Architect: Lauritz de Thurah

The Titken House (Danish: Titkens Gård) is a listed property situated at the corner of Bredgade (No. 60) and Fredericiagade (No. 18) in the Frederiksstaden district of central Copenhagen, Denmark.

== History ==
=== Early history ===
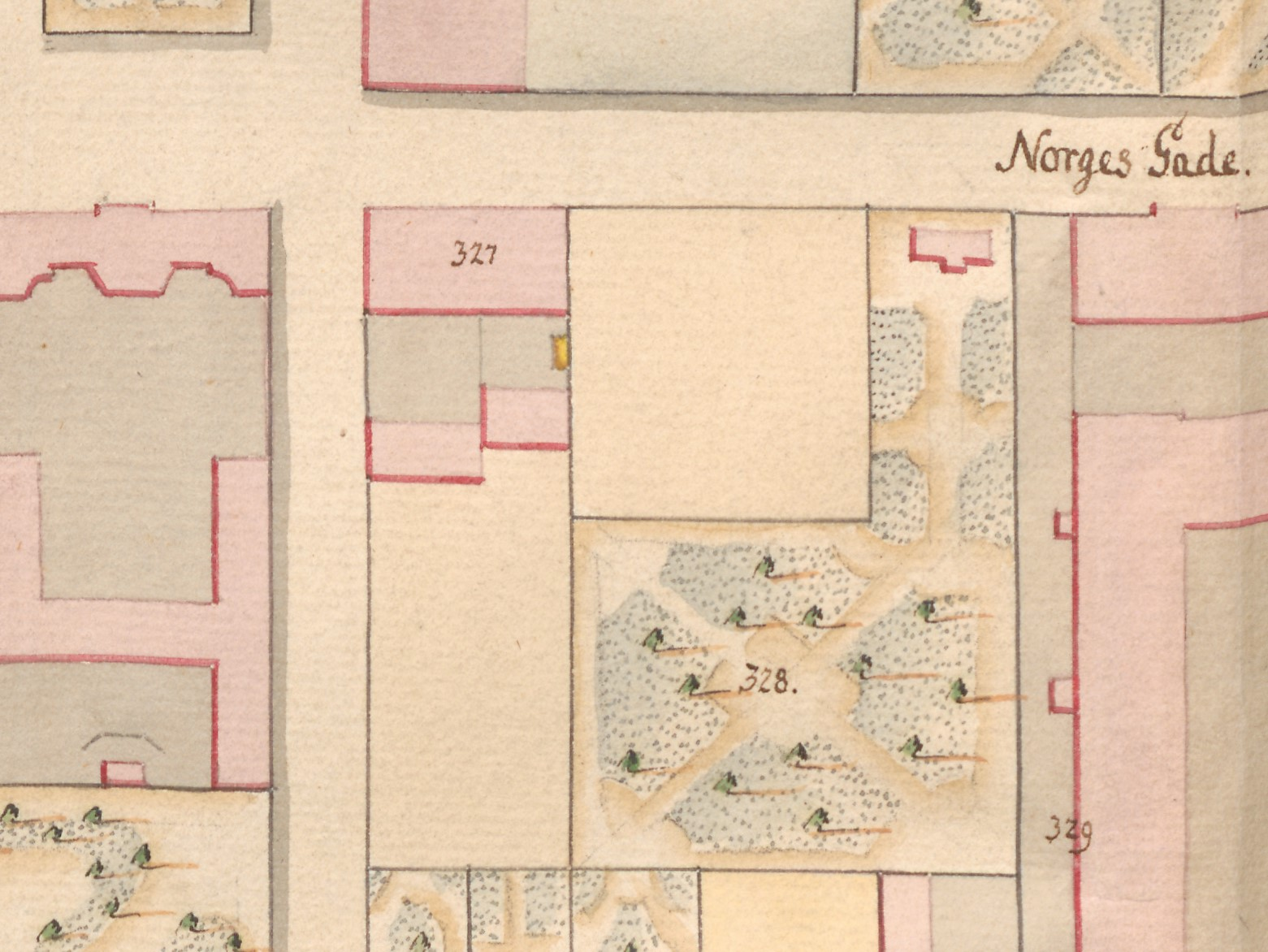
No. 327 seen on a detail from Christian Gedde's map of St. Ann's East Quarter, 1757.

The property is located on land that formerly belonged to the vast gardens of Sophie Amalienborg. The site was acquired by the wealthy grocer Niels Titken (1698–1771) in 1754. The present building on the site was constructed for him in 1754–1756. It has been suggested that the architect was Lauritz de Thurah since he has signed an estimate of needed materials but this has been questioned (see below). Titken's grocery store was originally located in the basement with entrance from Fredericiagade.

Titken's property was listed in the new cadastre of 1756 as No. 71 MM in St. Ann's Quarter. The property was marked on Christian Gedde's district map of St. Ann's East Quarter from 1757 as No. 327.

The property was listed in the new cadastre of 1806 as No. 180 in St. Ann's East Quarter. It was owned by J. C. Schutzmann at that time.

=== Funch and Fredericiagade 18 ===
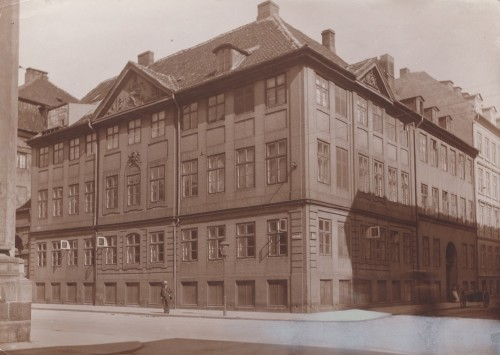
The Titken House in the late 19th century

The building was expanded by kitchen master (køkkenmester) H. F. Funch with the construction of Fredericiagade 18 in 1835. The naval officer and shipbuilder Henrik Gerner (1741–1787) had resided in the demolished building from 1784 to 1787. Nearby Gernersgade is named after him. Another naval officer, Jost van Dockum (1753–1834), had lived at the same address in 1784–1797. He would later be in charge of the Prøvestenen Battery during the Battle of Copenhagen in 1807. Fredericiagade 18 was rebuilt in 1835.

=== 1840 census ===
At the time of the 1840 census, No. 180 was home to 55 residents. P. F. Steinmann resided on the first floor with his wife Sophie Steinmann/née Dinesen), two unamrried daughters (aged 24 and 26), his nephew P. F. Steinmann (whose parents were in Paris), two male servants and three maids. Louise Delolme, a retired teacher, resided on the same floor with one maid. Arnold Tønder, a regiment quartermaster and military precesutor at the Zealand Hunters Corps, resided on the ground floor with his wife Charlotte Tønder (née Adler), their four children (aged two to six), one male servant and two maids. Caspare Pretzmann and Sophie Pretzmann, a brother and sister with means, were also resident on the ground floor. Peter Winsløv, a government official with title of justitsråd, resided on the second floor with his wife Sophie Winsløv (née Jacobsen), their three sons (aged nine to 13), two maids and the lodgers August Landy (aged 23) and Casper Schøller (aged 19). Christian Holmer, another government official with title of justitsrådm resided on the same floor with his son Emil Holmer. Peter Ludvig Becker, a joiner associated Rosenborg, resided in the basement with his wife Henriette Becker (née Bohsted) and their six children (aged one to 13).

Erik Leganger Weyhe, an army major on paid stand-by (ventepenge), resided on the second floor of the side wing with his wife Bothilde Christine Weyhe (née Thal), their five children (aged 14 to 28) and one maid.

=== 1745 census ===
Most of the residents were at the time of the 1845 census craftsmen or lower-ranking military officers. One of the officers was Peter Frderik Steinmann (1782–1954), owner of Tybjerggaard. The later organist and composer Niels Peter Hillebrandt (1815) was also among the residents. He lived there with his wife, three children and miother-in-law.

=== Ki'rbor family ===
The businessman Frederich Wilhelm Kiørboe (1821-1909= bought the property in 1858. He was married to Emma Michaeline Elise Søegaard

(1821-1900=. He owned it for around 40 years.

Peter Frederik Steinmann (1812–1894), a son of the former resident by the same name, resided at No. 19 in 1853–54. He would later serve as Minister of Defence in 1874–75.

== Architecture ==
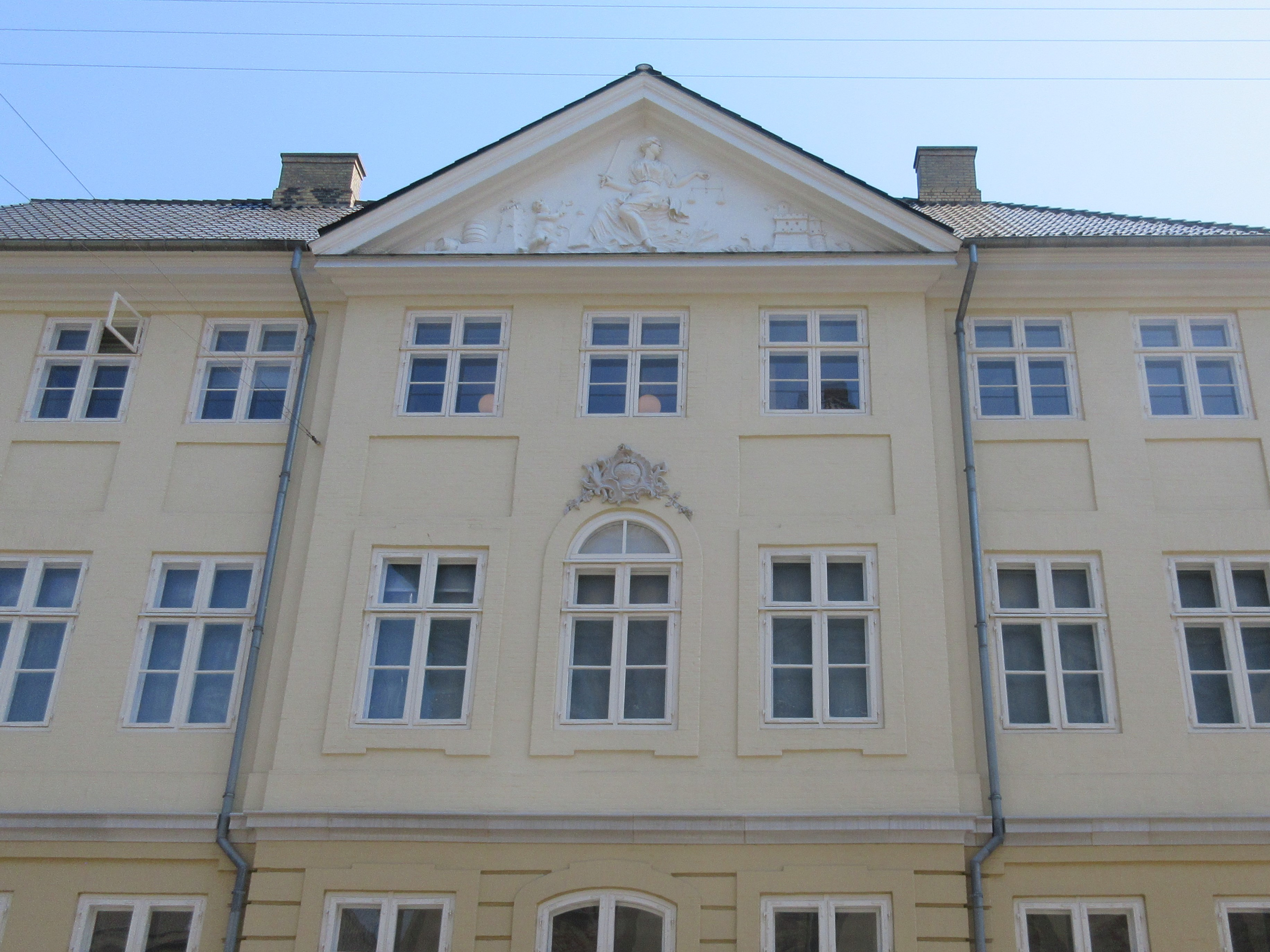
Detail of the facade towards Bregdade.

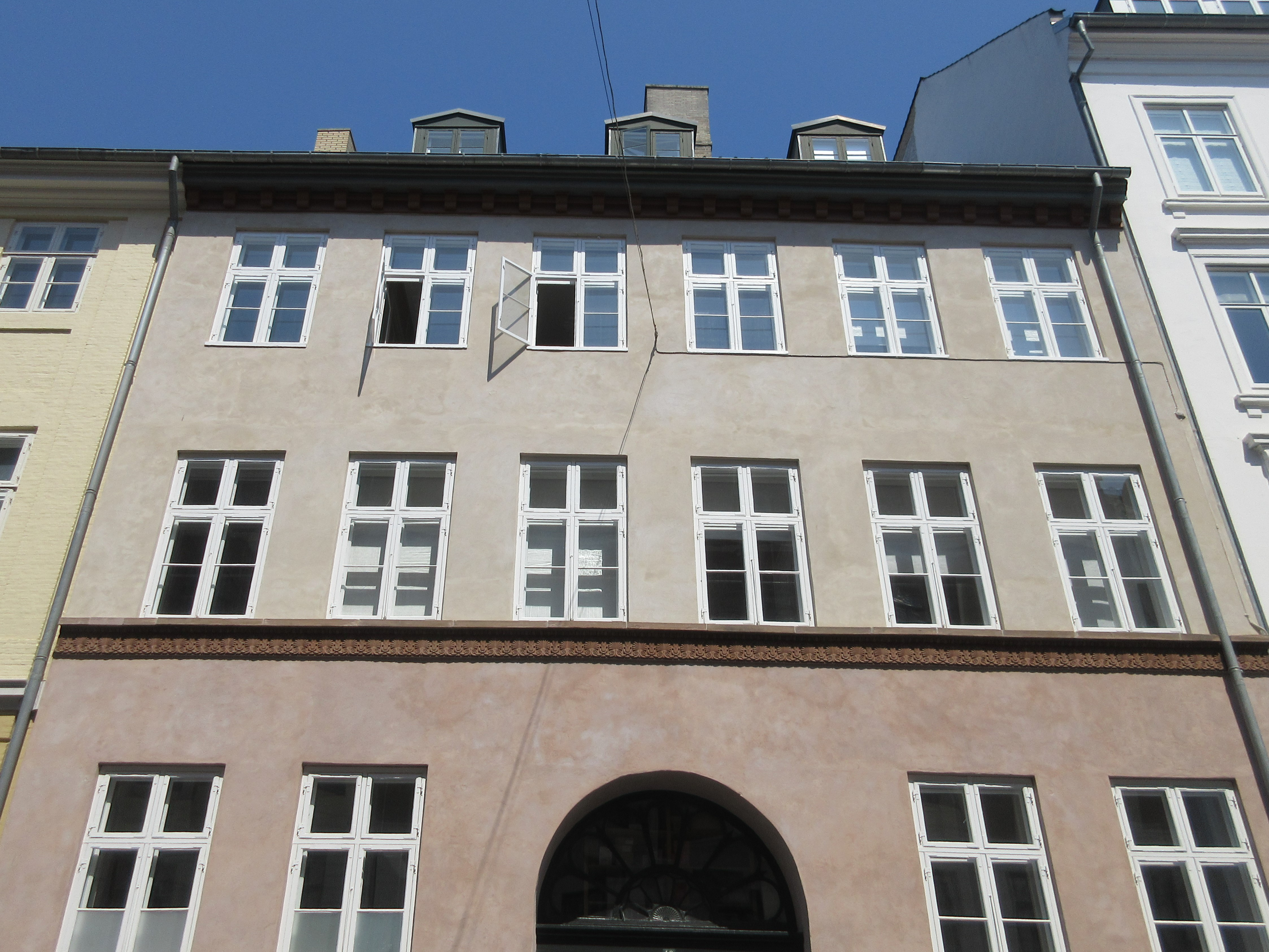
Fredericiagade 18 in June 2021.

The Titken House is built to a simple Baroque style design and consists of three storeys over a high cellar. The 11 bay long façade on Bredgade is only broken up by a three-bay median risalit tipped by a low triangular pediment. The facade on Fredericiagade is six bays long and features a two-bay triangular pediment.

In their book Danmarks Arkitektur, Byens huse-byens plan, Sys Hartmann and Villads Villadsen question the assumption that the building was designed by Lauritz de Thurah. They find it unlikely that he would have followed Eigtved's guidelines for buildings in Frederiksstaden to the extent that is the case and with such a meager result. They describe the 11-bay facade on Bredgade as monotonous and the median risalit with its triangular pediment as " crabbed". The two-bay triangular pediment on Fredericiagade is described as notoriously disharmonic and the roof that continues all the way down to the too tall windows is compared to "a hat pulled all the way down to the eye brows". The main entrance was originally located in the median risalit. It was accessed by way of a sandstone staircase and opened to a vestibule. This is also different from most of De Thurah's buildings where the main entrance is usually placed in a gateway in one of the sides.

Hartmann and Villadsen concludes that the façade may have been designed by some of Eigtved's associates after his death in 1754 and that Lauritz de Thurah may just have approved them.

Fredericiagade 18 is six bays wide and has a central gateway which opens to the courtyard.

The building was listed on the Danish registry of protected buildings and places by the Danish Heritage Agency in 1918.

== Today ==
The Titken House is today owned by the University of Copenhagen.

== Gallery ==
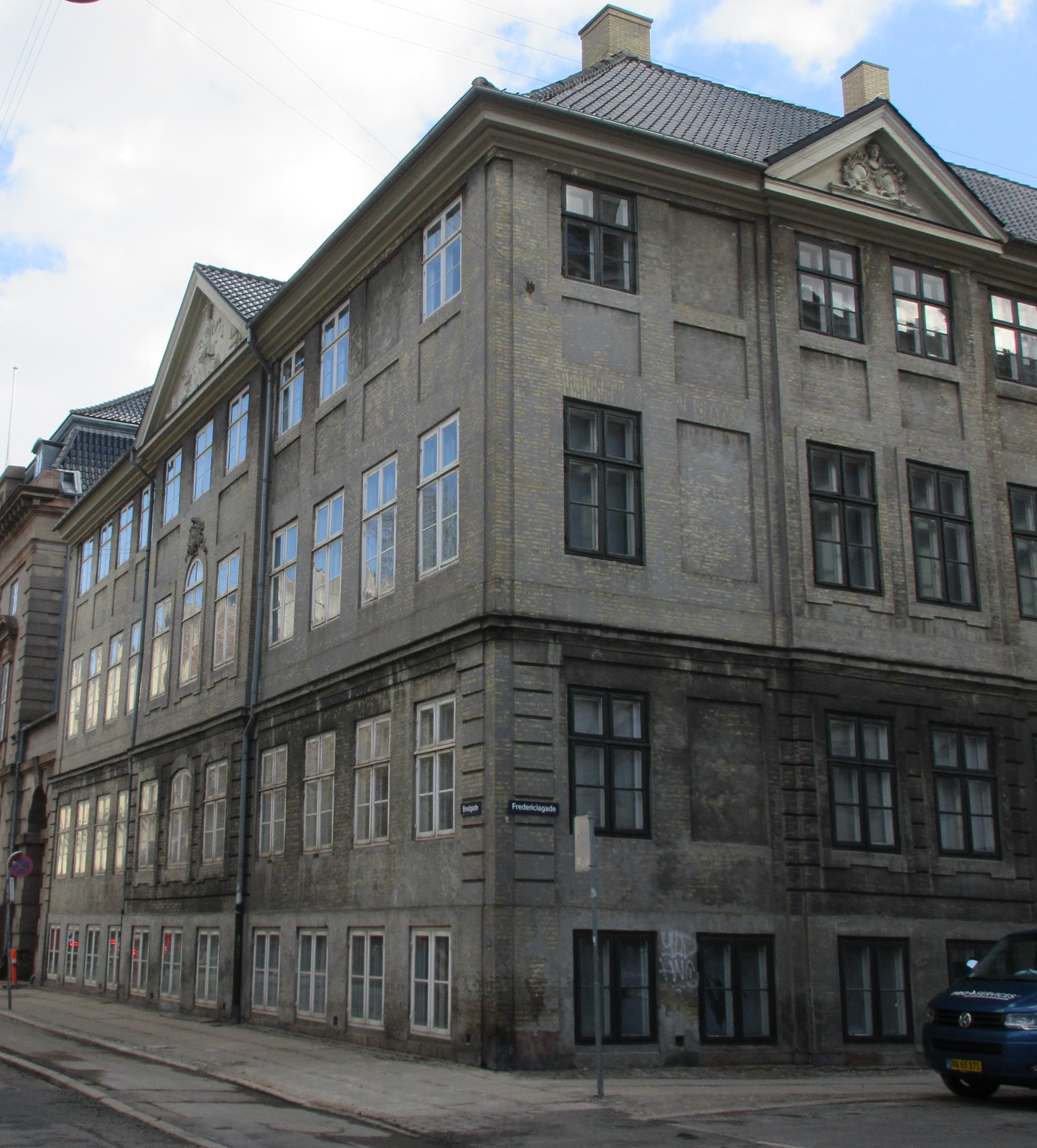

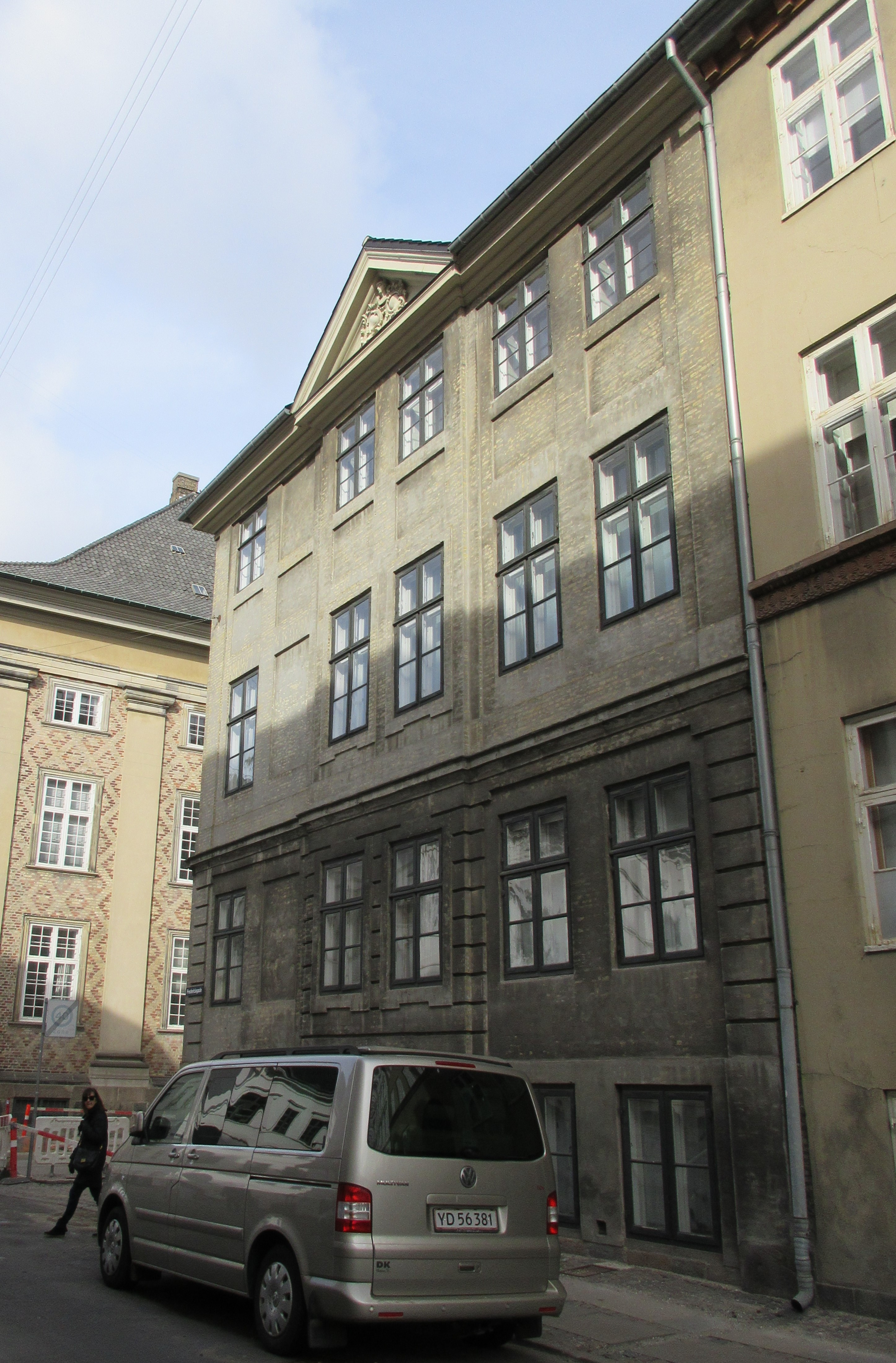
The facade on Fredericiagade.
