= Illustreret Tidende =

Danish weekly illustrated magazine (1859–1924)

- Front page, first edition
- Categories: Illustrated magazine
- Frequency: Weekly
- Founder: Otto Herman Delbanco
- Founded: 1859
- Final issue: 1924
- Country: Denmark
- Language: Danish

Illustreret Tidende was a Danish weekly illustrated magazine published from 1859 to 1924 in Denmark with international news, literature and entertainment content.

== History and profile ==
Illustreret Tidende was founded by Otto Herman Delbanco (originally a music publisher) with inspiration from similar magazines elsewhere, such as the German Illustrirte Zeitung and the English Illustrated London News. The first issue stated the raison d'être of the magazine: "a weekly report on important events and contemporary celebrities, novels, stories, traveller's stories, and other contents from science, literature, art and industry". The target group was the bourgeoisie and academics.

The painter Otto Bache's illustrations from the Danish-German war of 1864 were a break-through into mainstream for the magazine. All the illustrations were compiled into a special issue in 1964 comprising two hundred woodcuts of this important conflict, which undermined the Danish identity of being a major European military power.

Many young writing talents joined the magazine, e.g. Georg Brandes (who wrote literary and theater criticism) in 1862, although he was fired in 1869 when his views diverged from those of the editors. Graphic contributors included Lorenz Frølich, Carl Bloch, Julius Exner, Peter Tom-Petersen, Anton Dorph and Henrik Olrik

== See also ==
- List of magazines in Denmark
