= Proviantgården =

- Alternative names: Provianthuset

General information
- Coordinates: 55.6743°N 12.5802°E
- Completed: c. 1605

Technical details
- Floor count: 2

Proviantgården or Provianthuset is a historic building on Slotsholmen in Copenhagen, Denmark. The building was originally constructed in the early 1600s as part of a Christian IV's naval harbor project. Its name, Proviantgården (English: provisions yard), is in reference to its initial role as a provisions depot. Today, the building is used by Folketinget's administration, housing offices for MPs as well as the Copenhagen reading rooms of the National Archives.

== History ==
In the 1590s, Christian IV began building a new naval harbor on Slotsholmen. Proviantgården was constructed by the builder Bernt Pejtersen around 1605. The building was meant to furnish the king's ships with provisions when they came into the harbor. As such Holmen's grainstores were transferred to the building after it was completed.

The building has been damaged by three different fires, in 1626, 1719, and most recently in 1992. After a fire ravaged the building in 1626, the quartermaster who oversaw the building issued a promissory note to the king worth 2,000 sletdaler to be used for the timber to reconstruct the building. Because he made this payment to the king, it is believed that the quartermaster was to blame for the fire, though there is no record that he was prosecuted.

The naval dock was decommissioned and subsequently filled in during the 1860s.

== Architecture ==
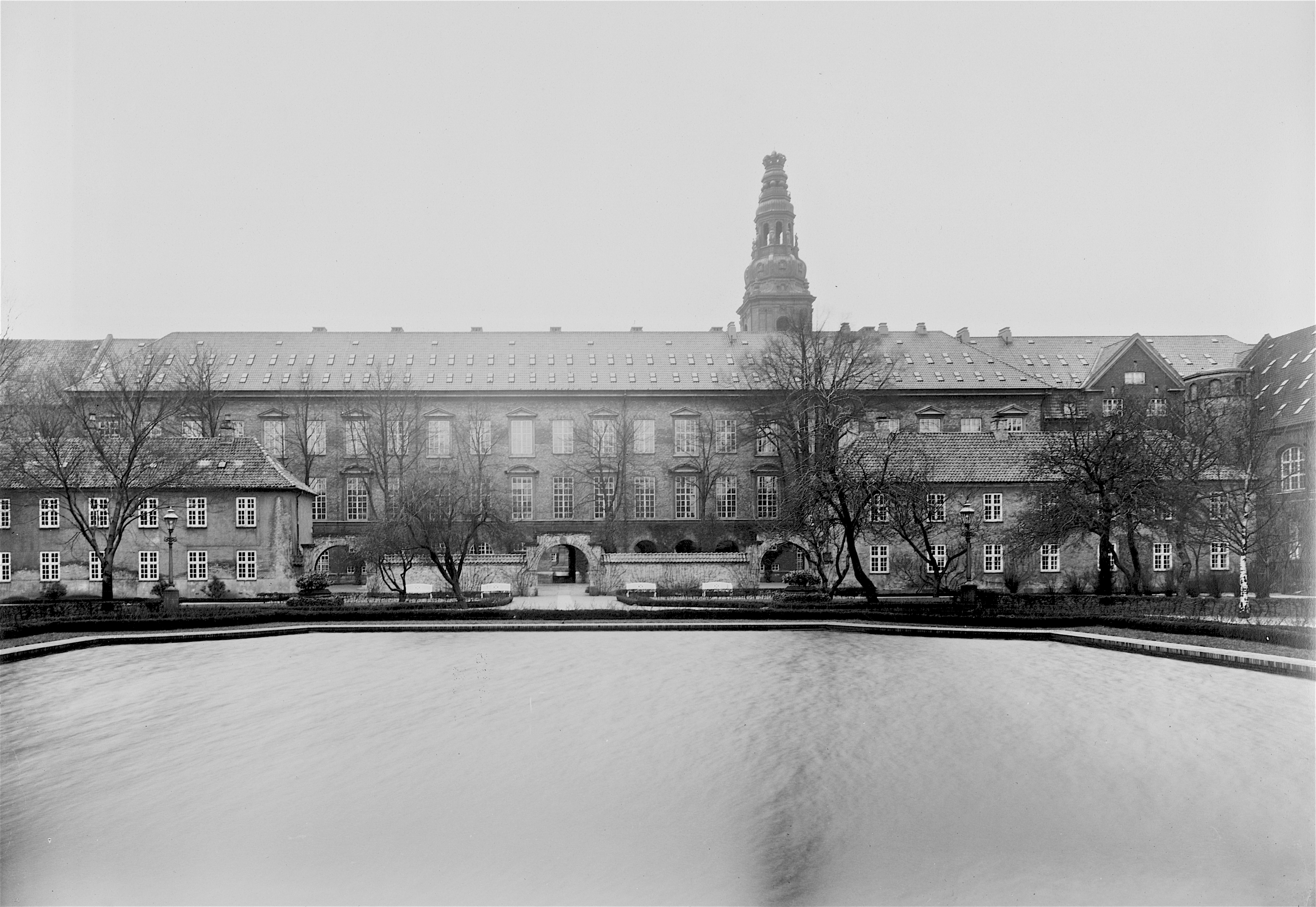
Rigsarkivet

Of the original building, only the robust brick walls, which are more than two meters thick, survive. The building is 163 metres long and two storeys high. A passageway, Proviantpassagen, runs between the west side of the building and the wall that surrounds the Royal Library Garden, linking Rigsdagsgården with the Christians Brygge waterfront. The building is listed as a historic monument.

== Gallery ==
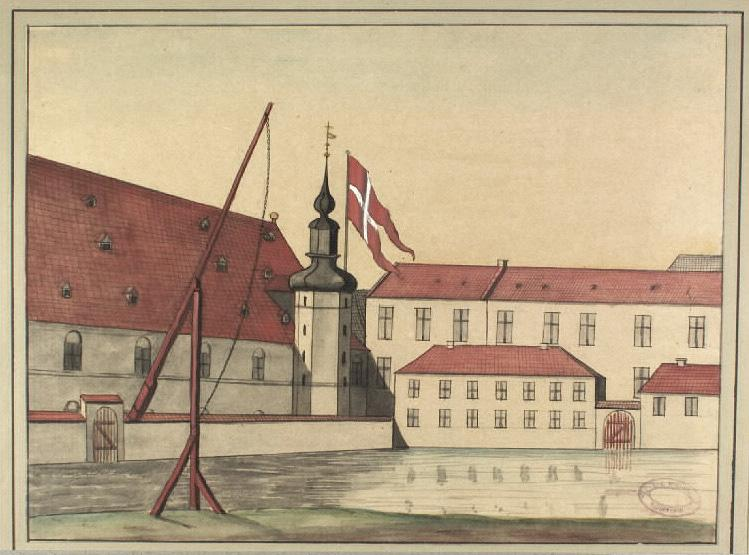
Depiction of the building as a supplies building c. 1749.

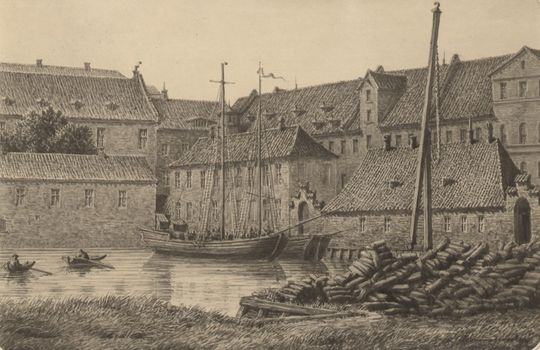
Depiction of Tøjhus Dock with Proviantgården. Christian Hetsch, c. 1850.

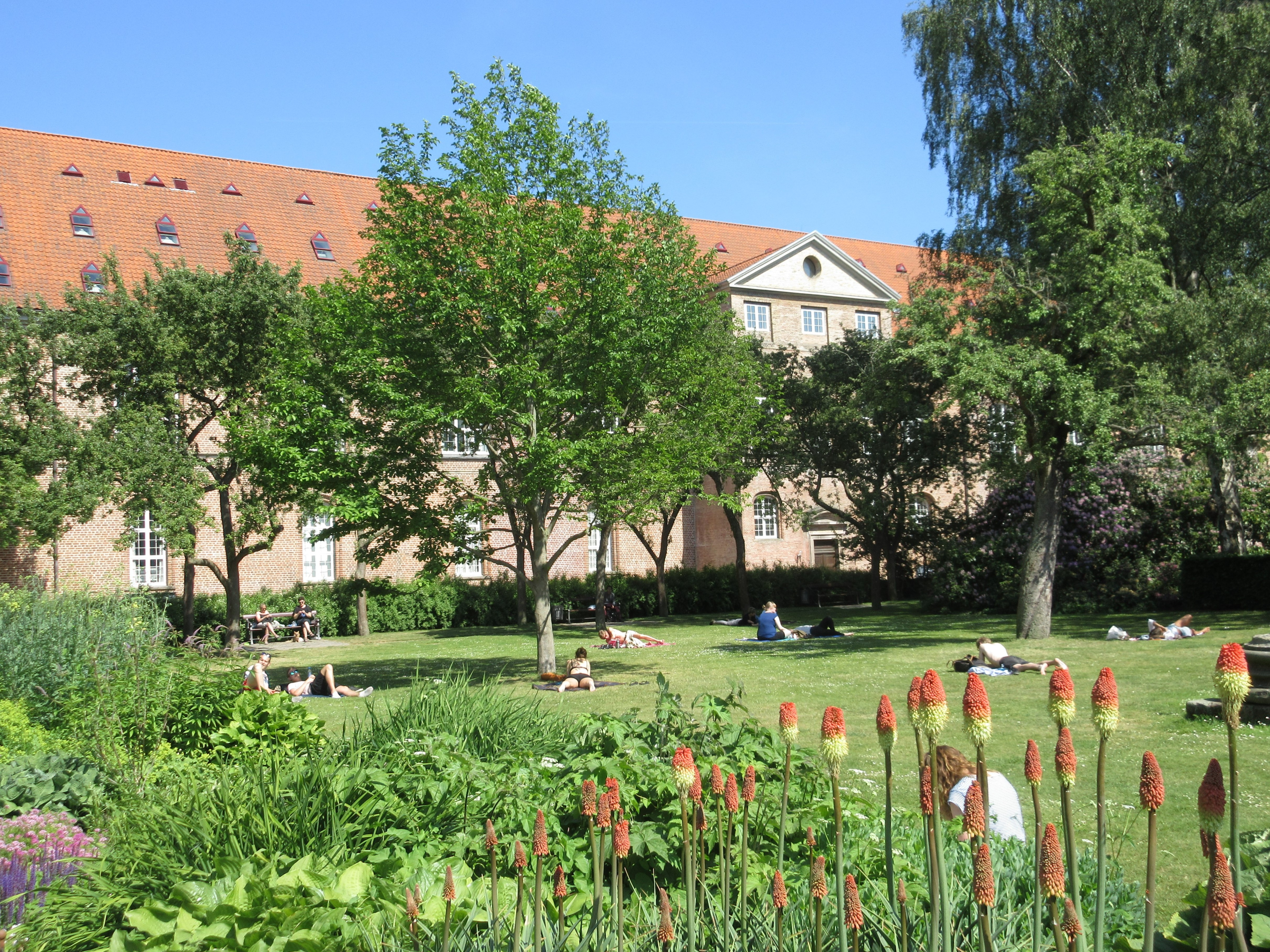
The building as seen from the Royal Library Garden, 2016.
