= Princess Elizabeth of Great Britain =

British princess (1741–1759)

Princess Elizabeth
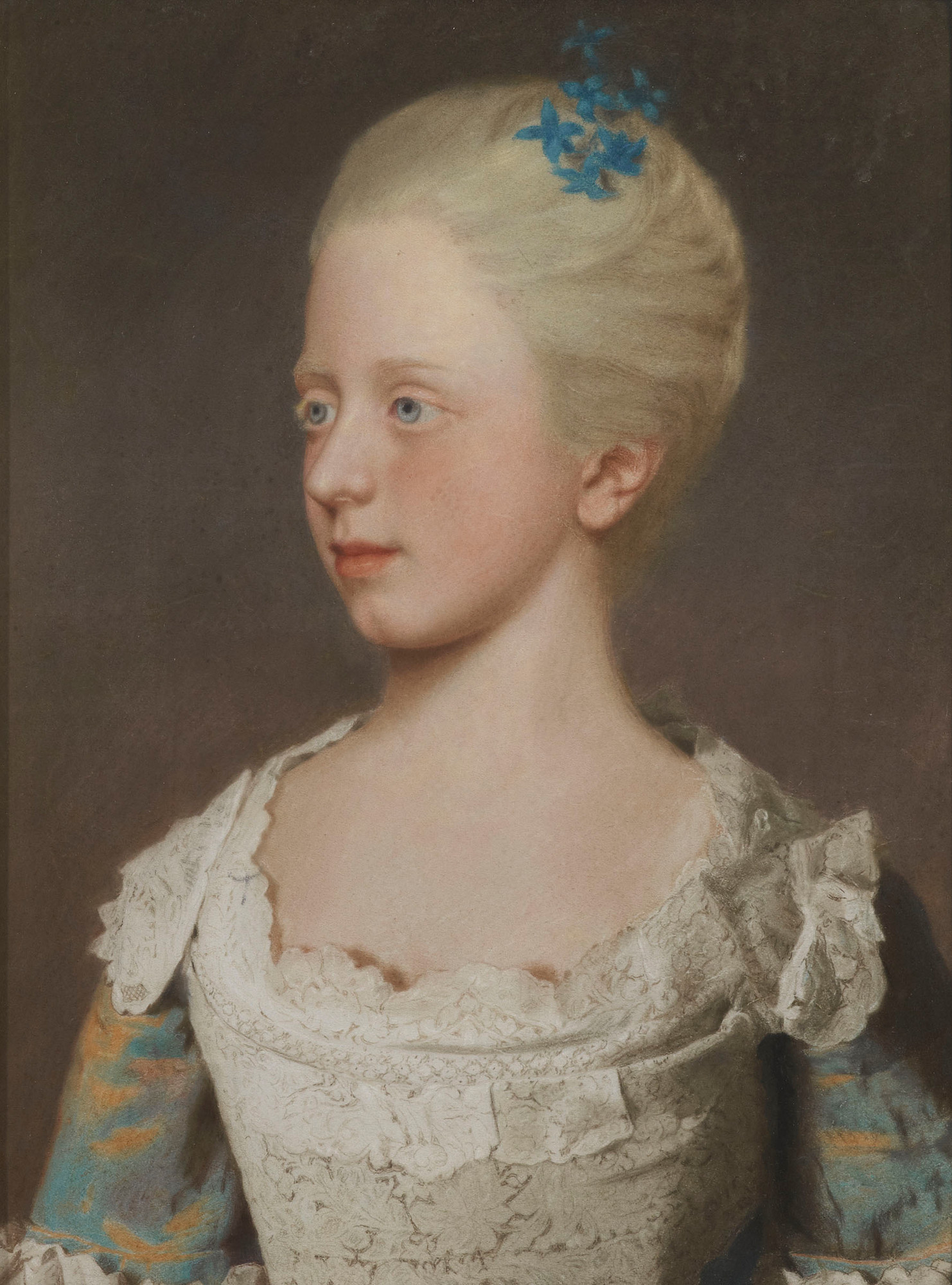
- Portrait by Jean-Étienne Liotard, 1754
- Born: 10 January 1741; Norfolk House, Westminster
- Died: 4 September 1759 (aged 18); Kew Palace, Surrey
- Burial: 14 September 1759; Westminster Abbey, Westminster
Names
- Elizabeth Caroline
- House: Hanover
- Father: Frederick, Prince of Wales
- Mother: Princess Augusta of Saxe-Gotha

Princess Elizabeth of Great Britain (Elizabeth Caroline: 10 January 1741 – 4 September 1759) was one of the children of Frederick, Prince of Wales, and Princess Augusta of Saxe-Gotha. She was a granddaughter of King George II and sister of King George III.

== Life ==
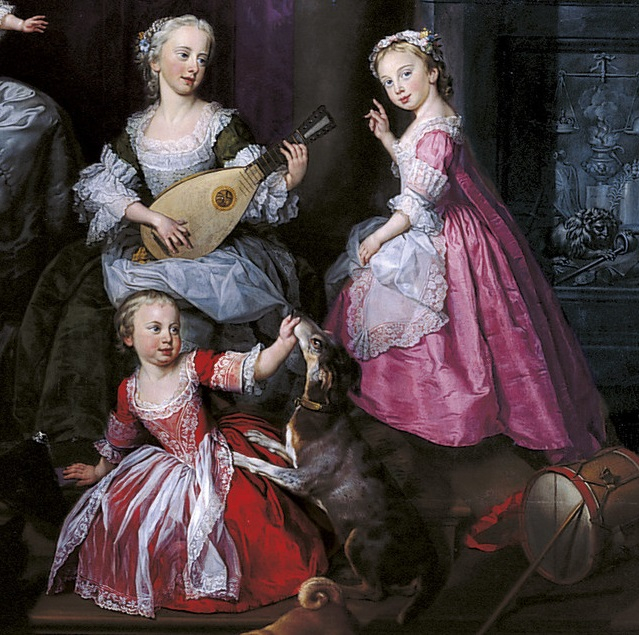
Elizabeth (left) with her younger sister Louisa (right) and brother Frederick (below), from a family portrait of 1751.

Princess Elizabeth was born at Norfolk House, St James's Square, Westminster. Her father was The Prince Frederick, Prince of Wales, eldest son of King George II and Caroline of Ansbach. Her mother was The Princess of Wales (née Augusta of Saxe-Gotha). She was christened twenty-five days later at Norfolk House, by The Bishop of Oxford, Thomas Secker — her godparents were The Margrave of Brandenburg-Ansbach (her first cousin once-removed by marriage; for whom The Lord Baltimore (Gentleman of the Bedchamber to her father) stood proxy), The Queen of Denmark (for whom Anne, Viscountess Irwin stood proxy) and the Duchess of Saxe-Gotha (her maternal aunt by marriage, for whom Lady Jane Hamilton stood proxy).

Little is known of her short life other than a fragment preserved in the Letters of Walpole.

We have lost another Princess, Lady Elizabeth. She died of an inflammation in her bowels in two days. Her figure was so very unfortunate, that it would have been difficult for her to be happy, but her parts and application were extraordinary. I saw her act in "Cato" at eight years old, (when she could not stand alone, but was forced to lean against the side-scene,) better than any of her brothers and sisters. She had been so unhealthy, that at that age she had not been taught to read, but had learned the part of Lucia by hearing the others study their parts. She went to her father and mother, and begged she might act. They put her off as gently as they could—she desired leave to repeat her part, and when she did, it was with so much sense, that there was no denying her.

— Horace Walpole, letter to Horatio Mann, 13 September 1759

She died on 4 September 1759 at Kew Palace, London and was buried at Westminster Abbey.

== Ancestors ==
Ancestors of Princess Elizabeth of Great Britain

8. George I of Great Britain
4. George II of Great Britain
9. Duchess Sophia Dorothea of Brunswick-Celle
2. Frederick, Prince of Wales
10. John Frederick, Margrave of Brandenburg-Ansbach
5. Princess Caroline of Brandenburg-Ansbach
11. Princess Eleonore Erdmuthe of Saxe-Eisenach
1. Princess Elizabeth of Great Britain
12. Frederick I, Duke of Saxe-Gotha-Altenburg
6. Frederick II, Duke of Saxe-Gotha-Altenburg
13. Princess Magdalena Sibylle of Saxe-Weissenfels
3. Princess Augusta of Saxe-Gotha
14. Charles, Prince of Anhalt-Zerbst
7. Princess Magdalena Augusta of Anhalt-Zerbst
15. Princess Sophia of Saxe-Weissenfels

== See also ==
- List of British princesses
