= Prince Edward, Duke of York and Albany =

British prince (1739–1767)

Prince Edward
- Duke of York and Albany
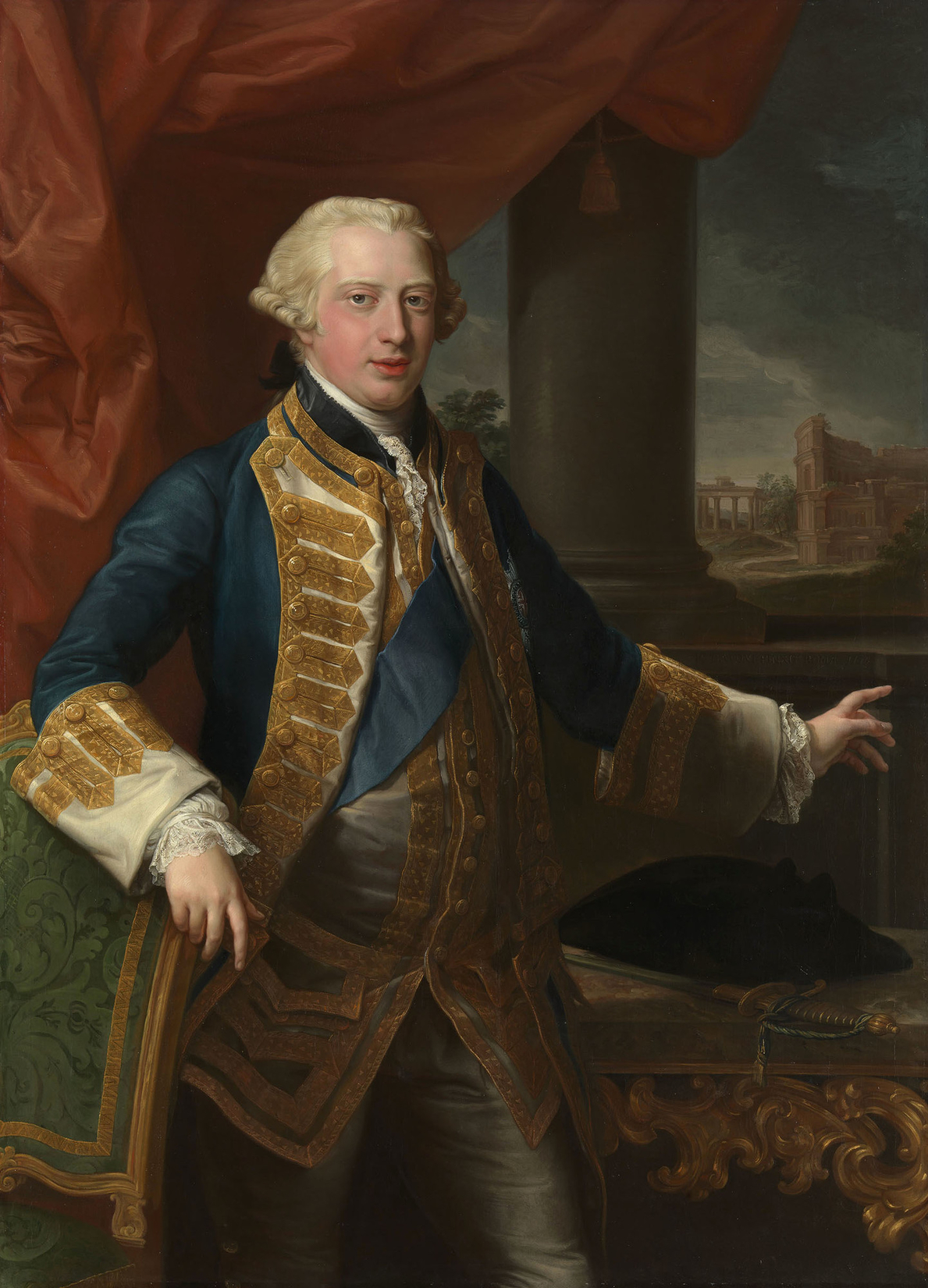
- Portrait of the Duke of York by Pompeo Batoni, c. 1764
- Born: 25 March 1739; Norfolk House, St James's Square, Westminster
- Died: 17 September 1767 (aged 28); Prince's Palace, Monaco-Ville
- Burial: 1 November 1767; Westminster Abbey, London
Names
- Edward Augustus
- House: Hanover
- Father: Frederick, Prince of Wales
- Mother: Princess Augusta of Saxe-Gotha
- Military career
- Allegiance: Great Britain
- Branch: Royal Navy
- Service years: 1759–1767
- Rank: Admiral of the Blue
- Conflicts: Seven Years' War; Battle of Saint Cast

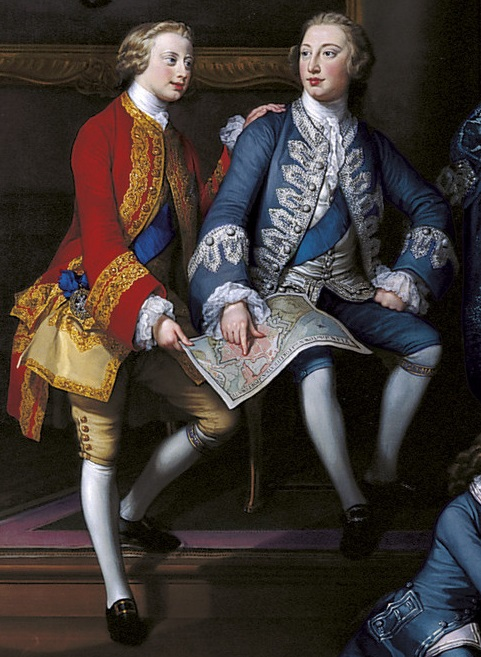
Edward (left) and George examining a map of the fortifications of Portsmouth – a detail from George Knapton's The Children of Frederick, Prince of Wales, 1751

Prince Edward, Duke of York and Albany (Edward Augustus; 25 March 1739 – 17 September 1767) was a younger brother of King George III of Great Britain and the second son of Frederick, Prince of Wales, and Princess Augusta of Saxe-Gotha.

== Early life ==
The young prince was baptised Edward Augustus, at Norfolk House, by the Bishop of Oxford, Thomas Secker, and his godparents were his great-uncle Frederick William I of Prussia (for whom Charles Douglas, 3rd Duke of Queensberry stood proxy), Charles I, Duke of Brunswick-Wolfenbüttel (who was represented by Henry Brydges, Lord Carnarvon), and his maternal aunt Fredericka, Duchess of Saxe-Weissenfels (for whom Lady Charlotte Edwin, a daughter of the late James Douglas, 4th Duke of Hamilton, stood proxy). As a boy, Edward, with his brother, went through long hours of schooling in arithmetic, Latin, geometry, writing, religion, French, German, Greek and even dancing to be well rounded.

== Seven Years' War ==
Prince Edward showed an interest in naval affairs and sought permission to serve with the Royal Navy. He participated in the naval descents against the French coast taking part in the failed Raid on St Malo, which ended in the Battle of St. Cast in 1758.

He was promoted to captain of HMS Phoenix on 14 June 1759. He was made Rear-Admiral of the Blue in 1761, vice-admiral of the blue in 1762, and in 1766, only a year before his death, rising to the rank of Admiral of the Blue.

== Later life ==
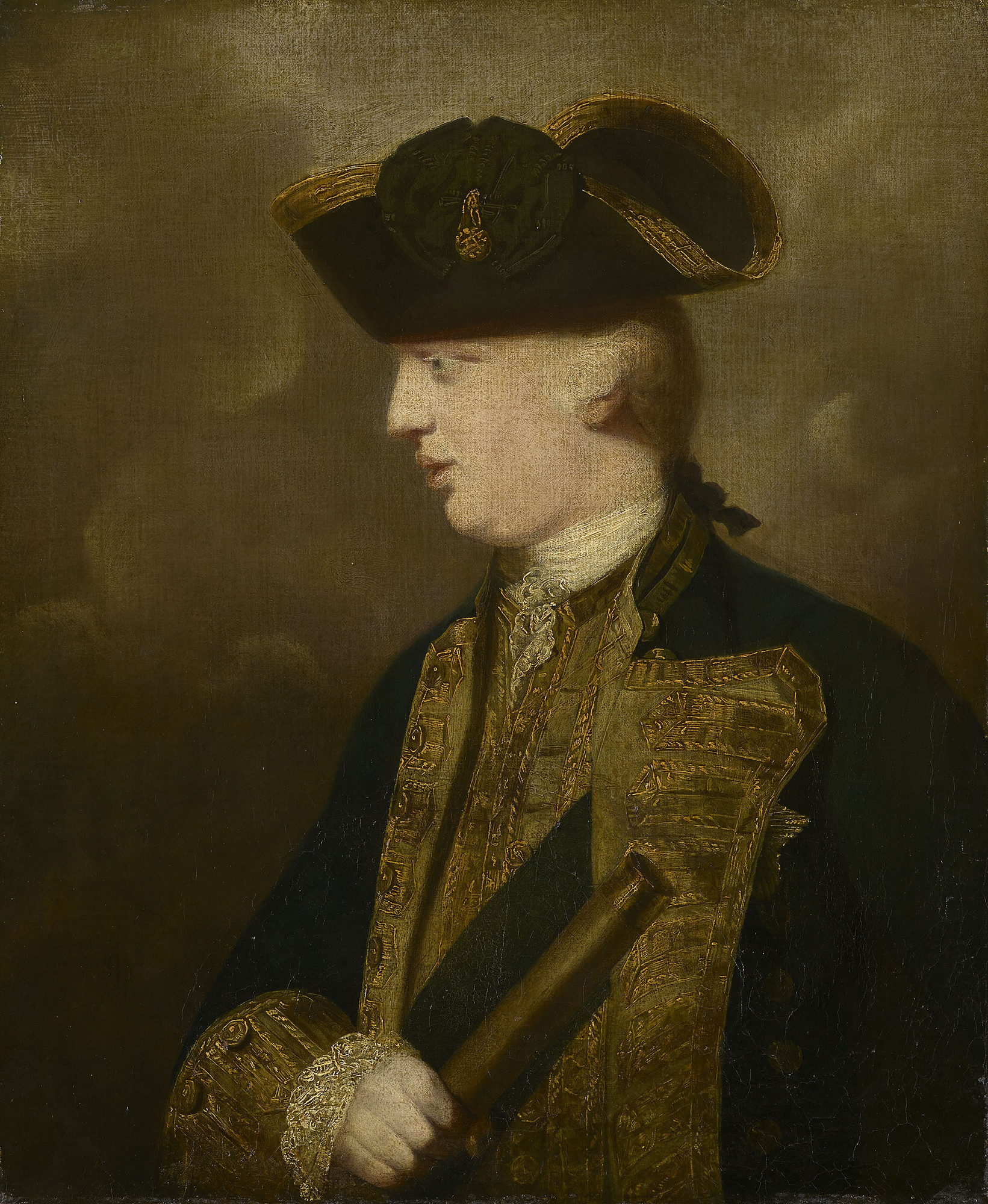
The Duke of York and Albany, 1763, as painted by Sir Joshua Reynolds.

He was created Duke of York and Albany and Earl of Ulster by his paternal grandfather, George II, on 1 April 1760. When Edward's brother ascended the throne on 25 October 1760 as George III, he named Edward a privy counsellor. From the time his brother became king and until the birth of the King's first child, the future George IV, on 12 August 1762, the Duke was heir presumptive to the British throne.

On 27 July 1765, he was initiated into the Masonic Order.

In the late summer of 1767, on his way to Genoa, the Duke fell ill and had to be landed in the harbour of Monaco. Despite the care and attention he was given, he died in the Palace of Honoré III, Prince of Monaco, on 17 September. The state bedchamber where the ill duke died has since been known as the York Room.

After his death, his body was returned to London aboard HMS Montreal, and is interred in Westminster Abbey.

== Legacy ==
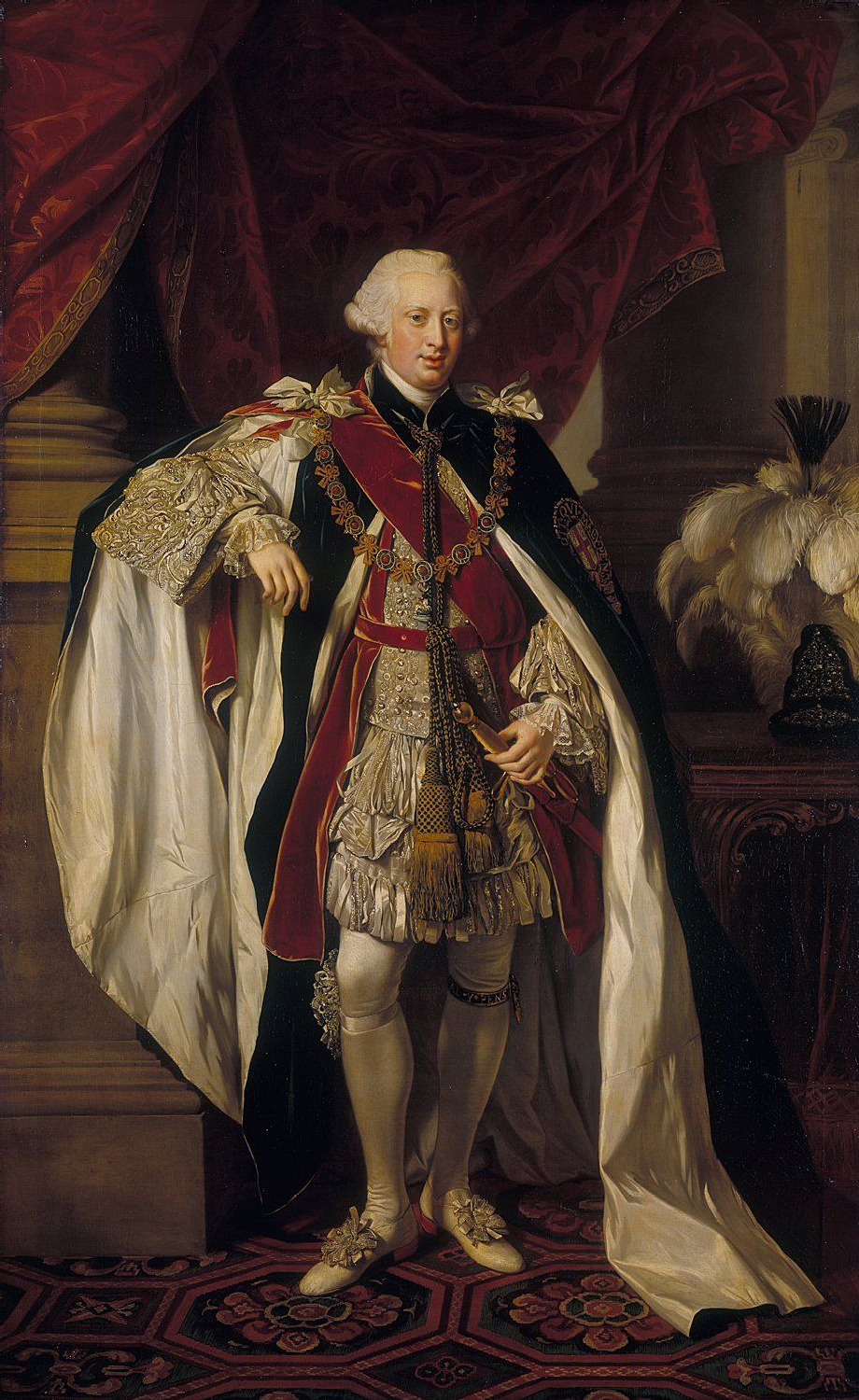
The Duke of York and Albany in the robes of the Order of the Garter, approx. 1764–1765

=== Literature ===
- In 1762, James Boswell published "The Cub at Newmarket", a poem which he dedicated to Prince Edward, without getting his permission. Boswell met the Prince at the Newmarket races in 1760 during his first visit to London. The cub referenced in the work is Boswell himself. The dedication reads:

TO

His ROYAL HIGHNESS

EDWARD

Duke of YORK

Sir,

PERMIT me to take this method of thanking your Royal Highness, for condescending to like the following Sketch. Or, in other Words, permit me to let the World know that this ſame Cub has been laughed at by the Duke of YORK;---- has been read to your Royal Highness by the Genius himself, and warmed by the immediate beams of your kind Indulgence.

HAD I been able to conceal this, I should have imagined that I had not the least Spark of the Enthusiasm of Parnassus in my Composition.---- To be so deficient in Vanity, which, if I am not mistaken, may be reckoned an inseparable Characteristic of a Poet.

THIS Trifle, SIR, would not presume to interrupt you, when engaged in matters of Consequence. It only begs leave to pay it's Respects in an hour devoted to cheerful Festivity.

I wish your Royal Highness a long, a merry, and a happy Life; and am,

Your obliged

Devoted Servant.

- Prince Edward is an important character in Norah Lofts' historical novel The Lost Queen (1969), chronicling the life of his youngest sister, Caroline Matilda, Queen Consort of Denmark and Norway as wife of King Christian VII. Edward is mentioned as having had a special link with her, stronger than with his other siblings. The book also depicts Edward as having planned shortly before his death to elope with a commoner woman with whom he was in love, marry her in Russia and never go back to Britain – which is not firmly attested in historical sources.

=== Places and people named after Prince Edward ===
- Prince Edward County, Virginia.
- Cape York, the tip of the Cape York Peninsula in Far North Queensland, is the northernmost point on the Australian continent.
- The Duke of York Islands (formerly German: Neu Lauenburg) in East New Britain Province, Papua New Guinea. They are found in St George's Channel between New Britain and New Ireland islands and form part of the Bismarck Archipelago.
- Duke of York Island, the largest island of Duke of York Islands, Papua New Guinea.
- Prince Edward Augustus, fourth son of King George III, who was born the day after the Duke was buried at Westminster Abbey.
- Fort Edward, a town in New York located on the eastern side of the Hudson River which was formerly the site of a large British fort during the Seven Years' War.

== Titles, styles, honour and arms ==
=== Titles and styles ===
- 25 March 1739 – 1 April 1760: His Royal Highness Prince Edward
- 1 April 1760 – 17 September 1767: His Royal Highness The Duke of York and Albany

=== Honours ===
- 1752: Royal Knight Companion of the Garter (KG)
- 1760: Privy Counsellor (PC)
- 1760: Royal Fellow of the Royal Society (FRS)

=== Arms ===
Edward was granted use of the arms of the kingdom, differenced by a label argent of five points, the centre bearing a cross gules, the other points each bearing a canton gules.

Coat of arms of Prince Edward, Duke of York and Albany

== Ancestors ==
Ancestors of Prince Edward, Duke of York and Albany

8. George I of Great Britain
4. George II of Great Britain
9. Princess Sophia Dorothea of Brunswick-Celle
2. Frederick, Prince of Wales
10. John Frederick, Margrave of Brandenburg-Ansbach
5. Princess Caroline of Brandenburg-Ansbach
11. Princess Eleonore Erdmuthe of Saxe-Eisenach
1. Prince Edward, Duke of York and Albany
12. Frederick I, Duke of Saxe-Gotha-Altenburg
6. Frederick II, Duke of Saxe-Gotha-Altenburg
13. Princess Magdalena Sibylle of Saxe-Weissenfels
3. Princess Augusta of Saxe-Gotha
14. Charles, Prince of Anhalt-Zerbst
7. Princess Magdalena Augusta of Anhalt-Zerbst
15. Princess Sophia of Saxe-Weissenfels
