= Prince Frederick of Great Britain =

British prince (1750–1765)

Prince Frederick
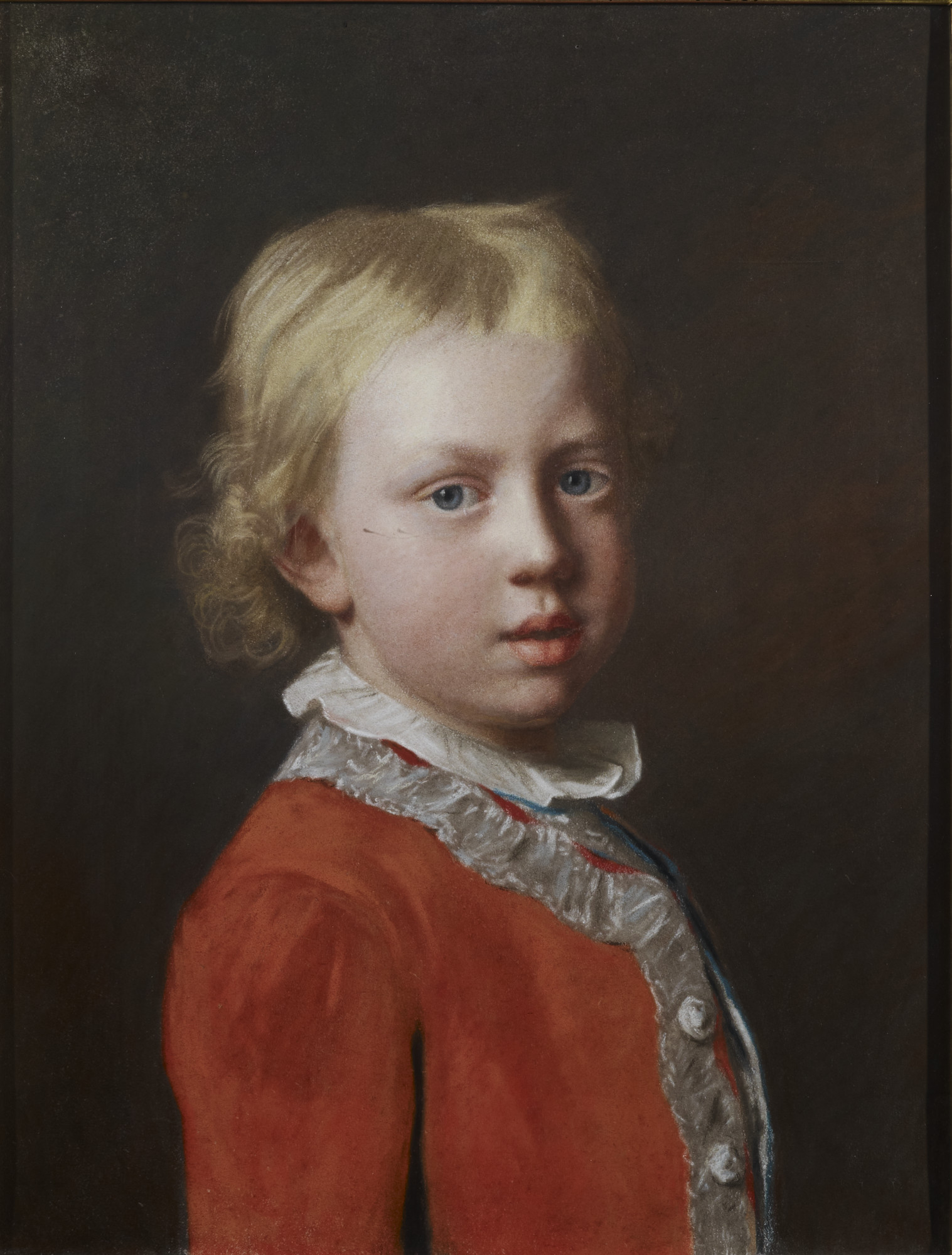
- Frederick aged 4 by Jean-Étienne Liotard
- Born: 13 May 1750; Leicester House, Westminster, England
- Died: 29 December 1765 (aged 15); Leicester House, Westminster, England
- Burial: 4 January 1766; Westminster Abbey, London
Names
- Frederick William
- House: Hanover
- Father: Frederick, Prince of Wales
- Mother: Princess Augusta of Saxe-Gotha

Prince Frederick William of Great Britain (13 May 1750 – 29 December 1765) was a grandchild of King George II and the youngest brother of King George III. He was the youngest son of Frederick, Prince of Wales and Princess Augusta of Saxe-Gotha.

He died at the young age of 15. He was buried at Westminster Abbey, London.

== Life ==
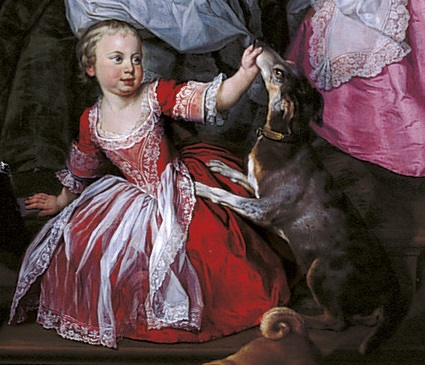
Frederick William as a toddler in 1751, before breeching

Frederick was born on 13 May 1750, at Leicester House, Westminster, London. His father was Frederick, Prince of Wales, eldest son of George II and Caroline of Ansbach. His mother was The Princess of Wales (née Augusta of Saxe-Gotha).

He was christened on 17 June of the same year, at the same house, by the Bishop of Oxford, Thomas Secker. His godparents were his brother Prince George, his maternal uncle Prince Wilhelm of Saxe-Gotha-Altenburg and his sister Princess Augusta.

The young prince died on 29 December 1765, at Leicester House.

== Arms ==
Frederick was posthumously granted the arms of the kingdom differenced by a label argent of five points, the centre bearing a fleur-de-lys azure, the other points each bearing a rose gules.

== Ancestors ==
Ancestors of Prince Frederick of Great Britain

8. George I of Great Britain
4. George II of Great Britain
9. Duchess Sophia Dorothea of Brunswick-Celle
2. Frederick, Prince of Wales
10. John Frederick, Margrave of Brandenburg-Ansbach
5. Princess Caroline of Brandenburg-Ansbach
11. Princess Eleonore Erdmuthe of Saxe-Eisenach
1. Prince Frederick William of Great Britain
12. Frederick I, Duke of Saxe-Gotha-Altenburg
6. Frederick II, Duke of Saxe-Gotha-Altenburg
13. Princess Magdalena Sibylle of Saxe-Weissenfels
3. Princess Augusta of Saxe-Gotha
14. Charles, Prince of Anhalt-Zerbst
7. Princess Magdalena Augusta of Anhalt-Zerbst
15. Princess Sophia of Saxe-Weissenfels
