= Prince William of Saxe-Gotha-Altenburg =

German prince (1701–1771)

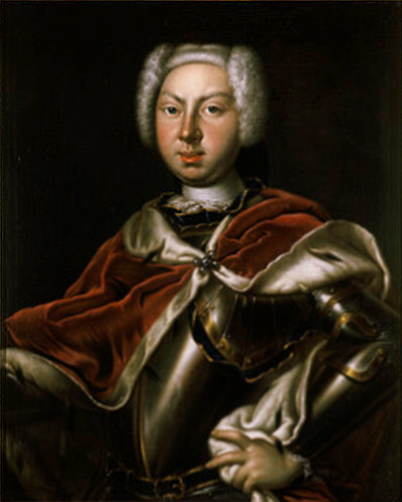
- Born: William Charles Christian of Saxe-Gotha-Altenburg; 12 March 1701; Gotha
- Died: 31 May 1771 (aged 70); Tonna, Germany
- Spouse: Anna of Holstein-Gottorp (m. 1742; died 1758)
- House: Saxe-Gotha-Altenburg
- Father: Frederick II, Duke of Saxe-Gotha-Altenburg
- Mother: Magdalena Augusta of Anhalt-Zerbst

Prince William Charles Christian of Saxe-Gotha-Altenburg (German: Wilhelm Carl Christian von Sachsen-Gotha-Altenburg; 12 March 1701, Gotha – 31 May 1771, Tonna) was a German prince of the Saxe-Gotha-Altenburg house, a junior line of the Ernestine Wettins. He served as a Generalfeldzeugmeister in the armies of the Holy Roman Empire.

== Family ==
He was the second surviving son of Frederick II, Duke of Saxe-Gotha-Altenburg (1676–1732) and his wife Magdalena Augusta (1679–1740), daughter of Charles, Prince of Anhalt-Zerbst. On 17 May 1750 he was one of three godparents to Prince Frederick of Great Britain, youngest son of William's younger sister Augusta and Frederick, Prince of Wales – the other two godparents were the child's elder siblings Augusta and George.

== Military career ==
In 1734 he became Generalwachtmeister in the forces of Charles VI, Holy Roman Emperor, commanding the same two regiments that his elder brother Frederick III, Duke of Saxe-Gotha-Altenburg had led against the French. In 1738 he became a Generalfeldmarschallleutnant and in 1750 a Generalfeldzeugmeister. He made two failed petitions to rise to Reichsgeneralfeldmarschall in 1753 and 1760 and soon afterwards resigned as a Generalfeldzeugmeister to take up residence in Tonna.

== Marriage ==
In Hamburg on 8 November 1742 he married Anna (1709–1758), daughter of Christian August of Holstein-Gottorp, Prince of Eutin and aunt of Catherine II of Russia. They had no children.

== Bibliography ==
- (in German) Johann Georg August Galletti: Geschichte und Beschreibung des Herzogthums Gotha, Gotha, 1779, S. 354
