= Johann Adolf of Saxe-Gotha-Altenburg =

Prince Johann Adolf
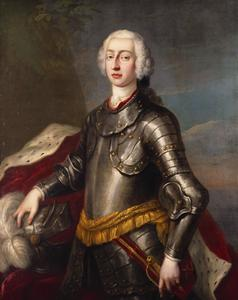
- Prince Johann Adolf of Saxe-Gotha-Altenburg
- Born: 18 May 1721; Gotha, Duchy of Saxe-Gotha-Altenburg
- Died: 29 April 1799 (aged 77); Friedrichstanneck, near Eisenberg, Germany
- Burial: Chapel of Christiansburg Castle in Eisenberg
- Spouse: Marie Maximiliane Elisabeth Schauer
- Issue: Friedrich Adolph (von Gothart); Johanna Adolfine Friederike von Gothart; Adolph Christian Carl von Gothart
- House: Saxe-Gotha-Altenburg
- Father: Frederick II, Duke of Saxe-Gotha-Altenburg
- Mother: Magdalena Augusta of Anhalt-Zerbst

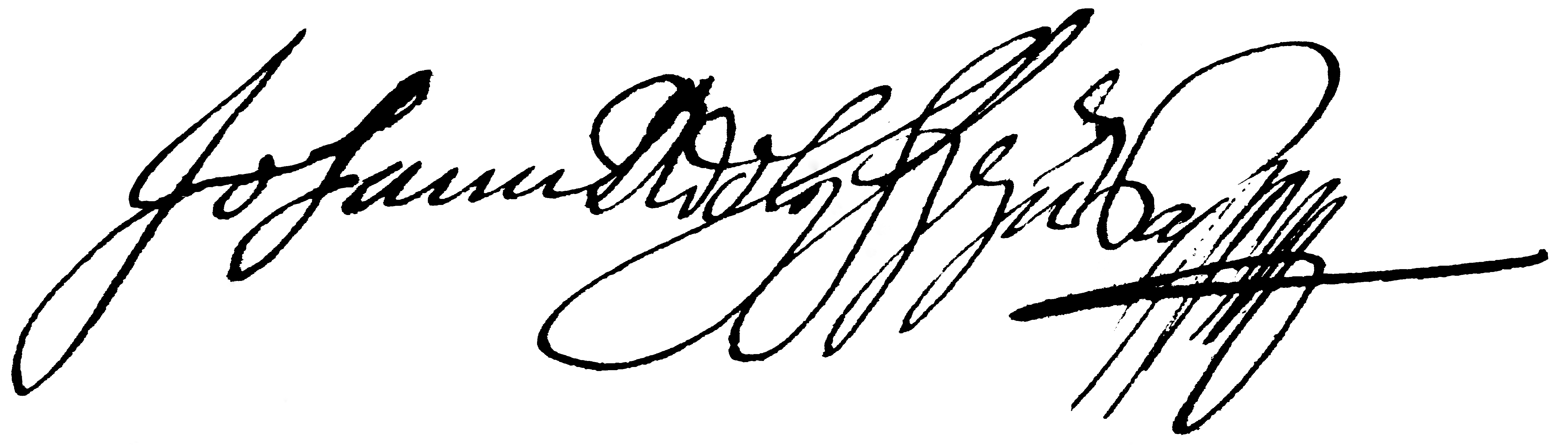
Signature of Johann Adolf of Saxe-Gotha-Altenburg („Johann Adolph zu Sachsen“)

Johann Adolf of Saxe-Gotha-Altenburg (18 May 1721, Gotha – 29 April 1799, Friedrichstanneck, now a district of Eisenberg, Thuringia), was a German prince of the House of Saxe-Gotha-Altenburg and a Saxon lieutenant general.

== Life ==
Johann Adolf was the youngest son of Frederick II, Duke of Saxe-Gotha-Altenburg and Magdalene Augusta of Anhalt-Zerbst. The prince was educated by Gottfried Christoph Sommer in Gotha and between 1735 and 1739 in Geneva. He joined the Danish military service in 1739. On his Grand Tour in 1741 he visited France als later his sister Augusta in the United Kingdom where he also obtained a Ph.D. from the University of Oxford.

In 1742 he started his service in the army of the Electorate of Saxony where he became holder of a regiment in 1744 that he commanded until 1746 on his own. He fought at the Battle of Hohenfriedberg. He became major general in 1746 and established his headquarter in Naumburg. In 1748 he obtained the Polish Order of the White Eagle and joined the Masonic lodge »Zu den drei Hammern« as »Chevalier de la Truelle d'Or« Master Masons in Naumburg. Johann Adolf became Saxon lieutenant general in 1753.

During The Seven Years' War he was captured by the Prussian Army near Altenburg in 1756. He has been released once he has sworn not to fight the Prussians further. Later, the Prussian Army tried to absorb his regiment.

Johann Adolf retired to Eisenberg where he had the house Markt 25 built in 1750. In 1756 he had built Schloss Friedrichstanneck nearby. After Prince Joseph of Saxe-Hildburghausen died in 1787 he became Elder of the Ernestine line of the House of Wettin, a position already hold by his older brother Frederick III until his death in 1772. Because of this position he obtained Oldisleben territory. Daniel Collenbusch became his personal physician in 1788. After Johann Adolf died in 1799 Prince Josias of Saxe-Coburg-Saalfeld became Elder of Ernestine Wettin and received the Oldisleben territory. Johann Adolf is buried at the chapel of Christiansburg Castle in Eisenberg.

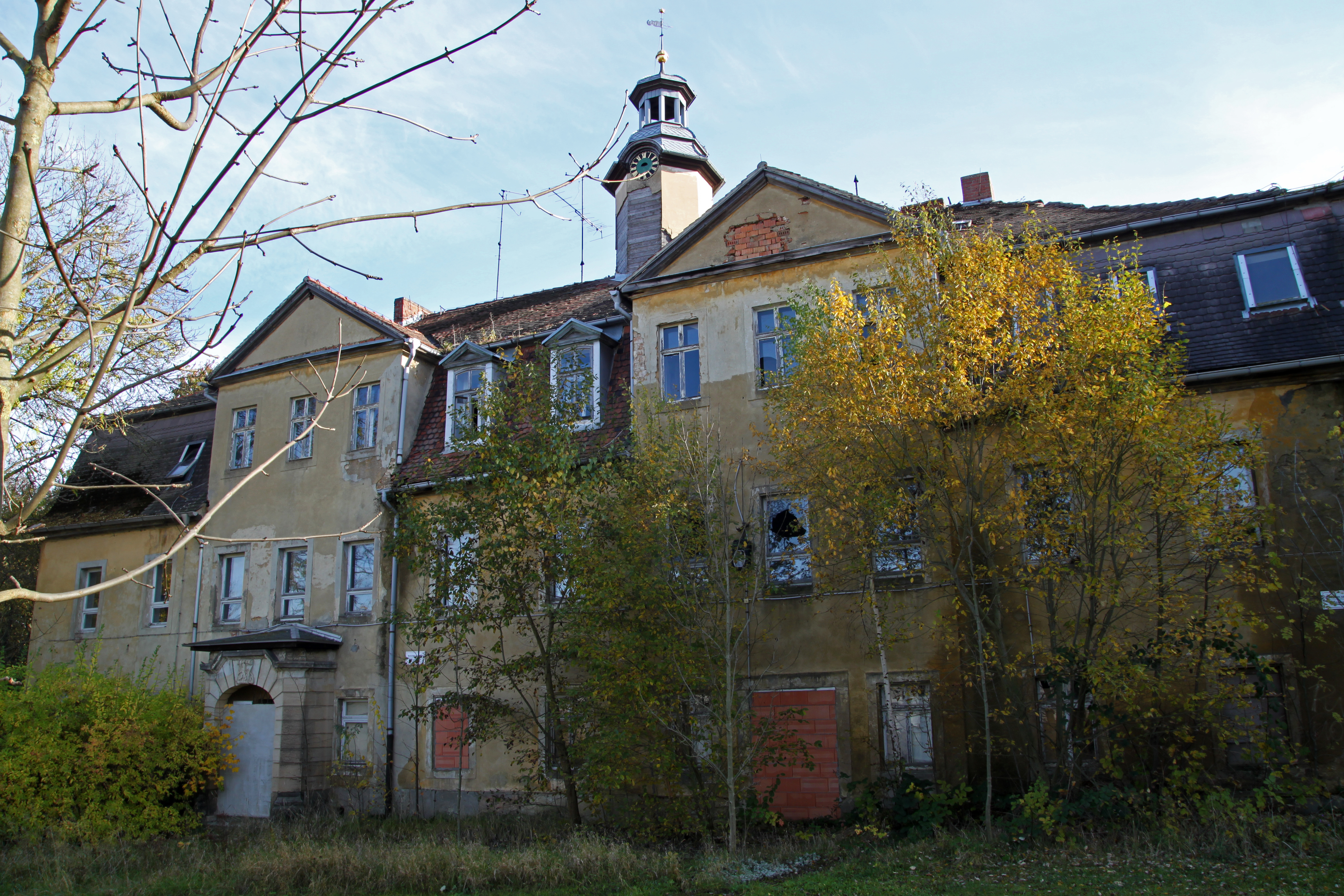
Schloss Friedrichstanneck

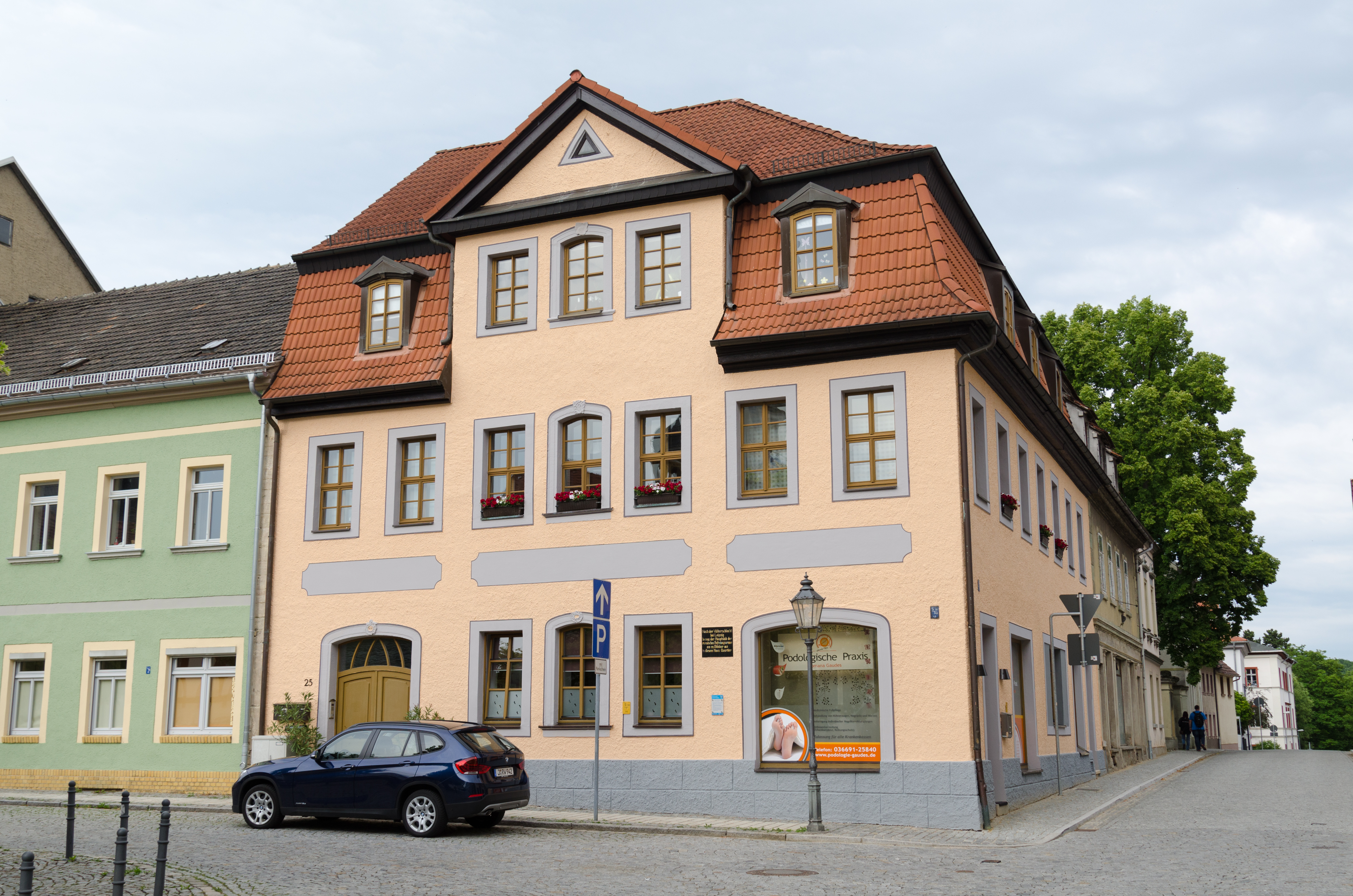
Markt 25, Eisenberg

== Marriage and issue ==
The Ernestine duchies of Saxe-Gotha-Altenburg and Saxe-Weimar considered a marriage between Johann Adolf and Princess Ernestine Albertine of Saxe-Weimar-Eisenach, daughter of Ernest Augustus I, Duke of Saxe-Weimar-Eisenach. The negotiations delayed over the dowry. In the meantime Ernestine Albertine decided for Philip II, Count of Schaumburg-Lippe. Johann Adolf later married Marie Maximiliane Elisabeth Schauer (25 October 1732 – 31 January 1779) morganatically. They had three children of which two survived:

- Friedrich Adolph (14 March 1760 – 17 March 1760) died in infancy.
- Johanna Adolfine Friederike (13 March 1761 – 15 September 1804) never married or had children.
- Adolph Christian Carl (9 January 1765 – 30 March 1835) never married and had no issue.

Marie Maximiliane Elisabeth Schauer was ennobled together with her two surviving children on 12 January 1779 by Joseph II, Holy Roman Emperor with the surname “von Gothart” at the instigation of Johann Adolf .

== Ancestors ==
Ancestors of Johann Adolf of Saxe-Gotha-Altenburg

16. John II, Duke of Saxe-Weimar
8. Ernest I, Duke of Saxe-Gotha
17. Dorothea Maria of Anhalt
4. Frederick I, Duke of Saxe-Gotha-Altenburg
18. Johann Philipp, Duke of Saxe-Altenburg
9. Princess Elisabeth Sophie of Saxe-Altenburg
19. Elisabeth of Brunswick-Wolfenbüttel
2. Frederick II, Duke of Saxe-Gotha-Altenburg
20. Johann Georg I, Elector of Saxony
10. August, Duke of Saxe-Weissenfels
21. Magdalene Sibylle of Prussia
5. Magdalena Sibylle of Saxe-Weissenfels
22. Adolf Frederick I, Duke of Mecklenburg
11. Anna Maria of Mecklenburg-Schwerin
23. Anna Maria of Ostfriesland
1. Prince John Adolf of Saxe-Gotha-Altenburg
24. Rudolph, Prince of Anhalt-Zerbst
12. John VI, Prince of Anhalt-Zerbst
25. Magdalene of Oldenburg
6. Prince Charles of Anhalt-Zerbst
26. Frederick III, Duke of Holstein-Gottorp
13. Sophie Augusta of Holstein-Gottorp
27. Maria Elisabeth of Saxony
3. Princess Magdalena Augusta of Anhalt-Zerbst
28. Johann Georg I, Elector of Saxony (= 20)
14. August, Duke of Saxe-Weissenfels (= 10)
29. Magdalene Sibylle of Prussia (= 21)
7. Sophie of Saxe-Weissenfels
30. Adolf Frederick I, Duke of Mecklenburg (= 22)
15. Anna Maria of Mecklenburg-Schwerin (= 11)
31. Anna Maria of Ostfriesland (= 23)

== Bibliography ==
- August Beck (1881). "Johann Adolf" . Allgemeine Deutsche Biographie (in German). Vol. 14. Leipzig: Duncker & Humblot. p. 376.
- Johann Samuel Ersch: Allgemeine Encyclopädie der Wissenschaften und Künste, Zweite Sektion, 21. Teil, Leipzig, 1842, p. 240 (digital copy)
- Ranft, Michael: Die Politische Historie von Thüringen, Meißen und Sachsen, welche der sächsische Patriot aus den bewährtesten Nachrichten in XI Stücken der studirenden Jugend in möglichster Kürze aufrichtig erzehlet, Band 10, Leipzig : Holle, 1772, p. 181f. (digital copy)
