= Princess Fredericka of Saxe-Gotha-Altenburg =

Fredericka of Saxe-Gotha-Altenburg
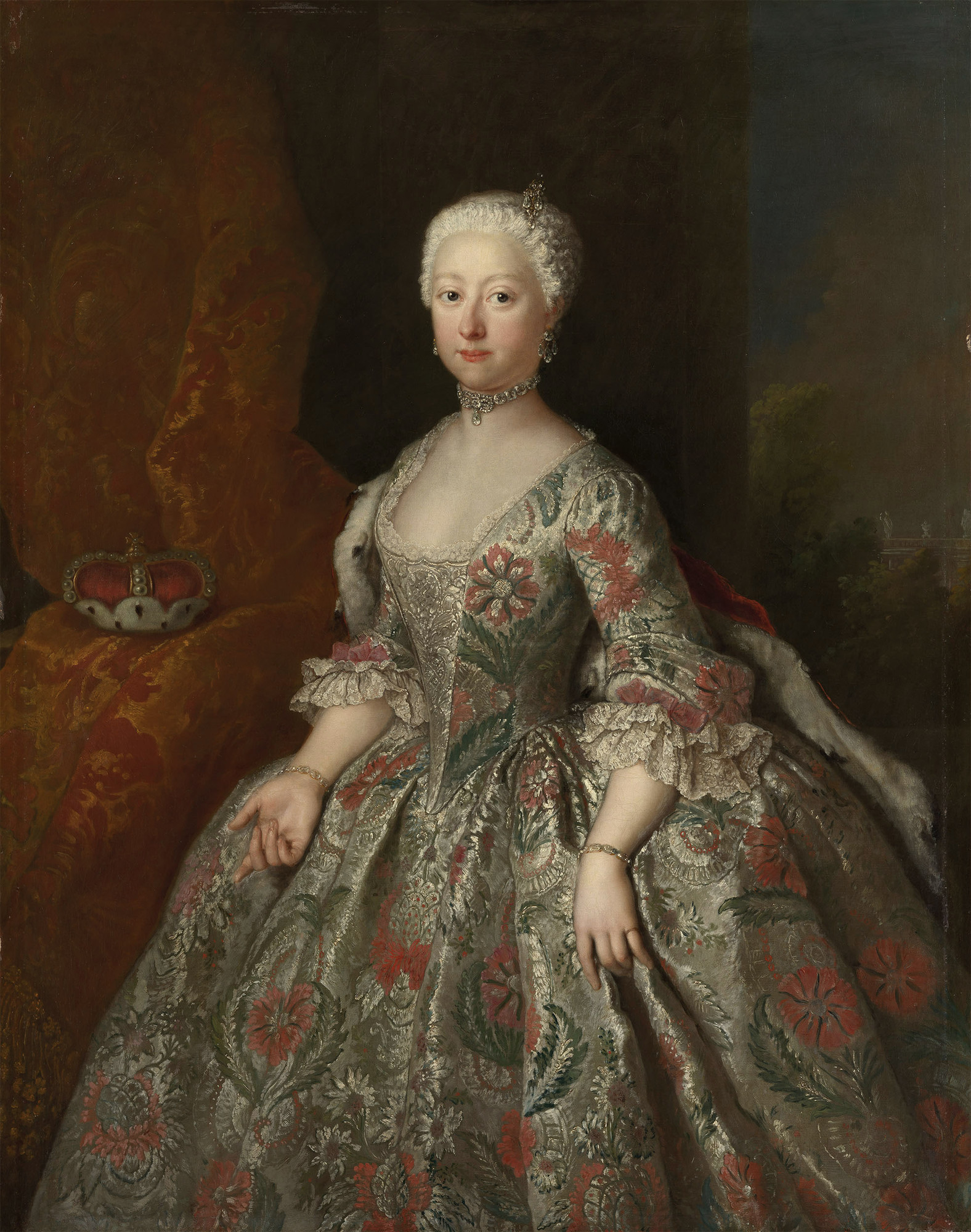
- Portrait by Antoine Pesne, 1740–46

Duchess consort of Saxe-Weissenfels
- Tenure: 1736–1746
- Born: 17 July 1715; Gotha
- Died: 2 May 1775 (aged 59); Fredericka's Castle, Langensalza
- Spouse: Johann Adolf II, Duke of Saxe-Weissenfels
- Issue: Karl Adolf, Hereditary Prince of Saxe-Weissenfels; Johann Adolf, Hereditary Prince of Saxe-Weissenfels; August Adolf, Hereditary Prince of Saxe-Weissenfels; Georg Adolf, Hereditary Prince of Saxe-Weissenfels; Princess Fredericka
- House: Saxe-Gotha-Altenburg
- Father: Frederick II, Duke of Saxe-Gotha-Altenburg
- Mother: Magdalena Augusta of Anhalt-Zerbst

Princess Fredericka of Saxe-Gotha-Altenburg (17 July 1715 – 2 May 1775), was a German princess of the House of Wettin and a Duchess of Saxe-Weissenfels by marriage.

Born in Gotha, she was the fifteenth of nineteen children born from the marriage of Frederick II, Duke of Saxe-Gotha-Altenburg and Magdalena Augusta of Anhalt-Zerbst. Of her eighteen older and younger siblings, only eight survived to adulthood: Frederick III, Duke of Saxe-Gotha-Altenburg, William, John August, Christian William, Louis Ernest, Maurice, Augusta (by marriage a Princess of Wales), and John Adolph.

== Life ==
In Altenburg on 27 November 1734, Fredericka married Prince Johann Adolf of Saxe-Weissenfels as his second wife. Two years later (1736), Johann Adolf inherited the paternal domains after the death of his older brother.

The union produced five children of which only one survived infancy but went on to die later in childhood:

1. Karl Adolf, Hereditary Prince of Saxe-Weissenfels (Weissenfels, 7 June 1736 – Weissenfels, 24 March 1737).
2. Johann Adolf, Hereditary Prince of Saxe-Weissenfels (Weissenfels, 27 June 1738 – Weissenfels, 21 October 1738).
3. August Adolf, Hereditary Prince of Saxe-Weissenfels (Weissenfels, 6 June 1739 – Weissenfels, 7 June 1740).
4. Georg Adolf, Hereditary Prince of Saxe-Weissenfels (Weissenfels, 17 May 1740 – Weissenfels, 10 July 1740).
5. Fredericka Adolfine (Weissenfels, 27 December 1741 – Langensalza, 4 July 1751).

After her husband's death in 1746 at the age of 31, Fredericka retired to Dryburg Castle in Langensalza, the usual Wittum of the Dowager Duchesses of the Weissenfels branch. Shortly after, she acquired a bourgeois garden and more lands in the east of the old town, in front of the city walls. Between 1749-1751, a Rococo style palace called Fredericka's Castle (German: Friederikenschlösschen) was built under her orders. The building had mansard roofs with ornate dormers; two cavalry houses flanked the castle. The park has an orangery, and a coach house, which still exists today. The entrance portal carries an alliance coat of arms of Saxe-Gotha-Altenburg and Saxe-Weissenfels. The Dowager Duchess died there aged 59. She was buried in the Schlosskirche, Weissenfels.

After Fredericka's death, her former personal physician, Christian Friedrich Stöller, acquired the property. From 1922 to the 1990s, the castle was in the possession of Ida Mary Fries-Fiscowitsch. Thanks to the private owners until 1945 the interior was changed, but the exterior remained almost intact. In the 1990s, the castle became the property of the city, and from 1994 to 2000, the castle and park were renovated. Based on historical plans of the castle, the garden was reconstructed in the Baroque basic structure from 1751. Since 1946, the castle and park have been used for cultural events and weddings.

== Notes ==
Princess Fredericka of Saxe-Gotha-Altenburg House of Wettin Born: 17 July 1715 Died: 2 May 1775
German royalty
Preceded by Louise Christine of Stolberg-Stolberg-Ortenberg	Duchess consort of Saxe-Weissenfels; 1736-1746	Duchy reincorporated to the Electorate of Saxony
