= Princess Augusta of Saxe-Gotha =

Princess of Wales (1719–1772)

Augusta of Saxe-Gotha-Altenburg
- Princess of Wales
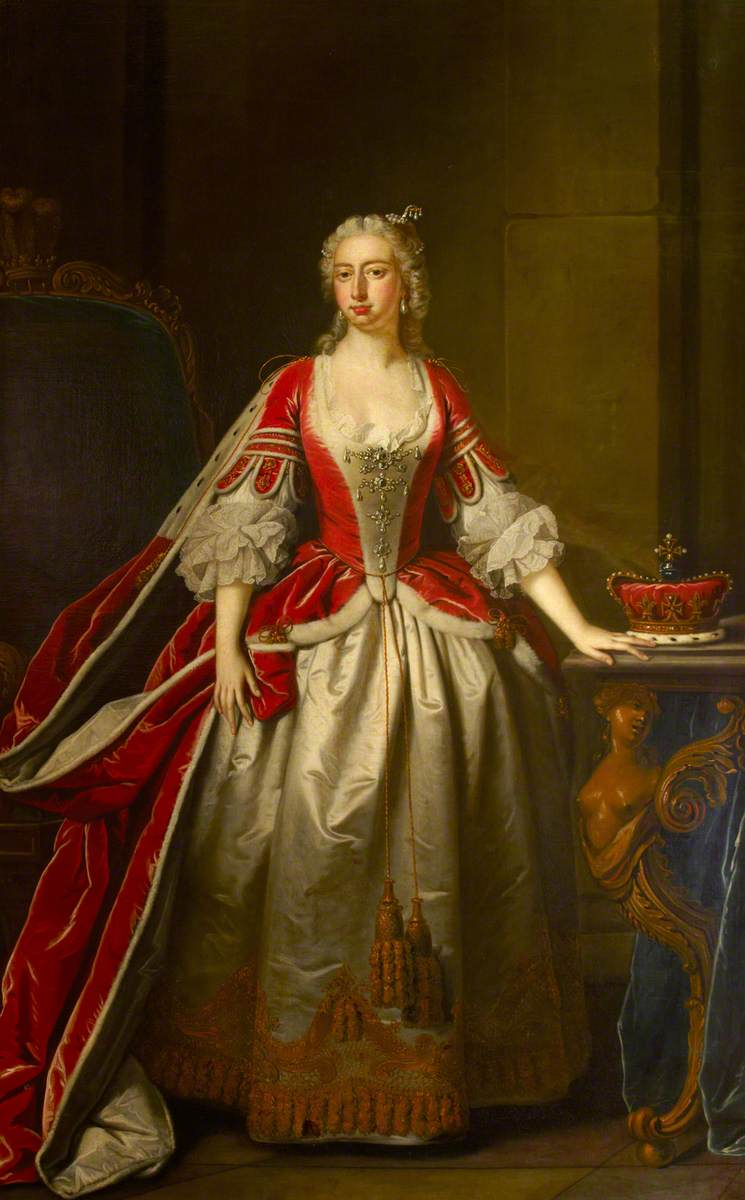
- Portrait by Thomas Hudson, 1750
- Born: 30 November 1719; Gotha, Duchy of Saxe-Gotha-Altenburg, Holy Roman Empire
- Died: 8 February 1772 (aged 52); Carlton House, London, England
- Burial: 15 February 1772; Westminster Abbey
- Spouse: Frederick, Prince of Wales (m. 1736; died 1751)
- Issue: Augusta, Duchess of Brunswick-Wolfenbüttel; George III; Prince Edward, Duke of York and Albany; Princess Elizabeth; Prince William Henry, Duke of Gloucester and Edinburgh; Prince Henry, Duke of Cumberland and Strathearn; Princess Louisa; Prince Frederick; Caroline Matilda, Queen of Denmark and Norway
- House: Saxe-Gotha-Altenburg
- Father: Frederick II, Duke of Saxe-Gotha-Altenburg
- Mother: Princess Magdalena Augusta of Anhalt-Zerbst

Princess Augusta of Saxe-Gotha-Altenburg (30 November [O.S. 19 November] 1719 – 8 February 1772) was Princess of Wales by marriage to Frederick, Prince of Wales, eldest son and heir apparent of King George II. She never became queen consort, as Frederick predeceased his father in 1751. Augusta's eldest son succeeded her father-in-law as George III in 1760. After her spouse died, Augusta was the presumptive regent of Great Britain in the event of a regency, until her son reached majority in 1756.

== Early life ==
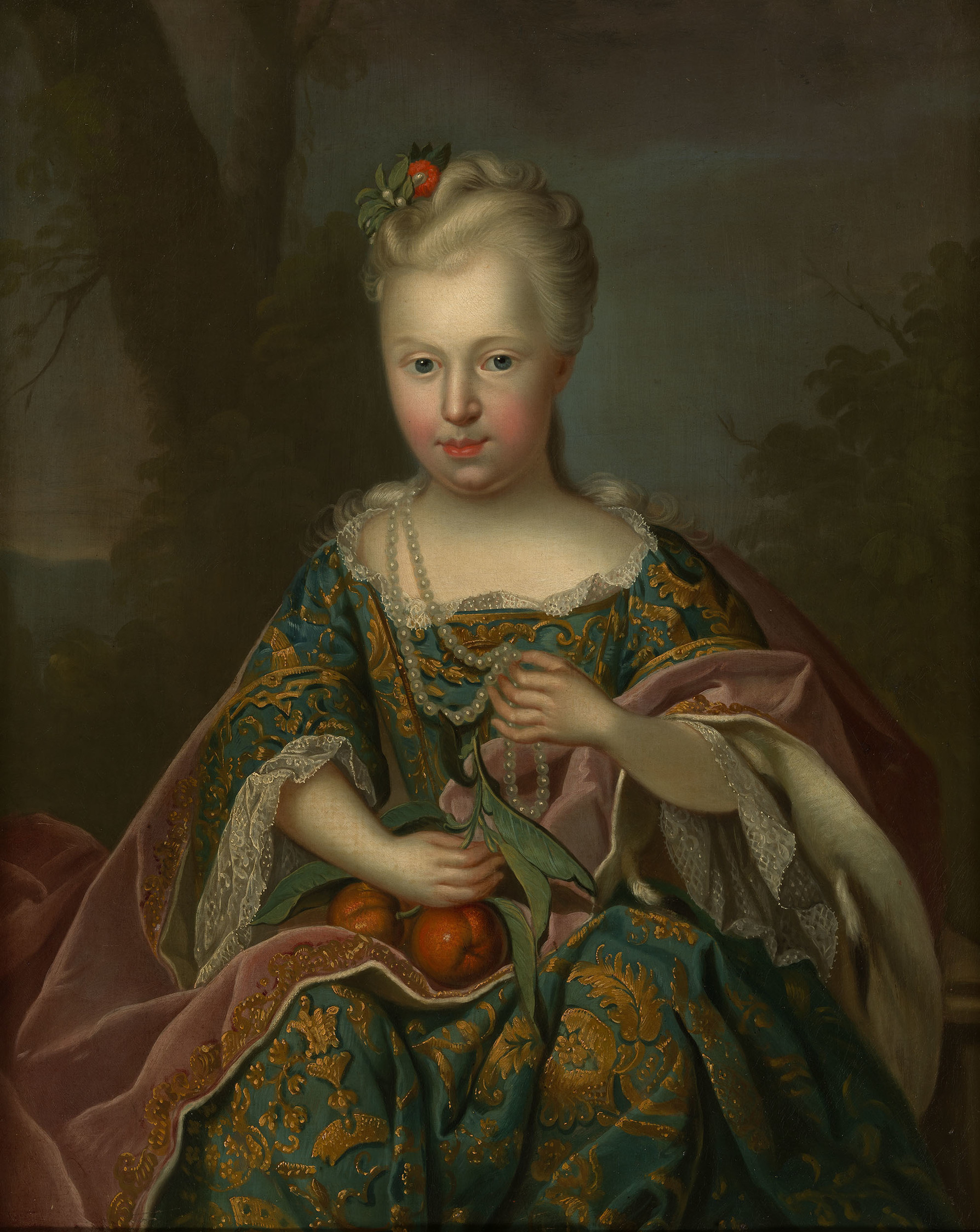
Princess Augusta as a child

Princess Augusta was born in Gotha to Frederick II, Duke of Saxe-Gotha-Altenburg and Magdalena Augusta of Anhalt-Zerbst. Her paternal grandfather was Frederick I, Duke of Saxe-Gotha-Altenburg, eldest surviving son of Ernest I, Duke of Saxe-Gotha-Altenburg.

In 1736, it was proposed that she marry 29-year-old Frederick, Prince of Wales, eldest son of George II of Great Britain and his queen consort Caroline of Ansbach.

Frederick had been intended to marry Princess Louisa Ulrika, eldest unmarried daughter of Frederick William I of Prussia. A marriage alliance between Great Britain and Prussia had been an ambition for many years. However, when George II suggested that his eldest son would marry Louisa Ulrika, while his second (unmarried) daughter would marry the eldest son of the Prussian king, Frederick William demanded that his eldest son should likewise marry the eldest (unmarried) daughter of the king of Great Britain, and George II refused to agree to this demand.

Around the time the Prussian plan was cancelled, there were rumours that Frederick might marry Diana Russell, Duchess of Bedford, granddaughter of Sarah Churchill, Duchess of Marlborough, and that such a marriage had been proposed when he visited the Duchess's lodge at Richmond. Queen Caroline felt a need to arrange a marriage for her son quickly, to preempt any possibility of such a mésalliance. She therefore suggested to the King that, when he next visited the Electorate of Hanover, he should also visit Saxe-Gotha-Altenburg and view the princesses there. The King did so, and informed the Queen that he considered Augusta suitable. When the matter was broached with Frederick, he simply replied that he would accept any bride his father decided was suitable for him. His attitude arose from a desire to obtain an additional allowance from Parliament to be financially independent of his father.

Augusta did not speak French or English, and it was suggested that she be given lessons before the wedding, but her mother did not consider it necessary, as the British royal family were from Germany., and her Protestant faith was seen as highly suitable. She arrived in Britain, speaking virtually no English, aged 16, for a wedding ceremony which took place almost immediately, on 8 May [O.S. 27 April] 1736, at the Chapel Royal in St James's Palace, London.

At the time of her wedding, Augusta was described as tall and slender, with regular features, an oval face, and light brown hair. Contemporary accounts noted that although her figure was still developing, she was considered likely to become attractive, and her eyes were described as bright and expressive.

== Princess of Wales ==
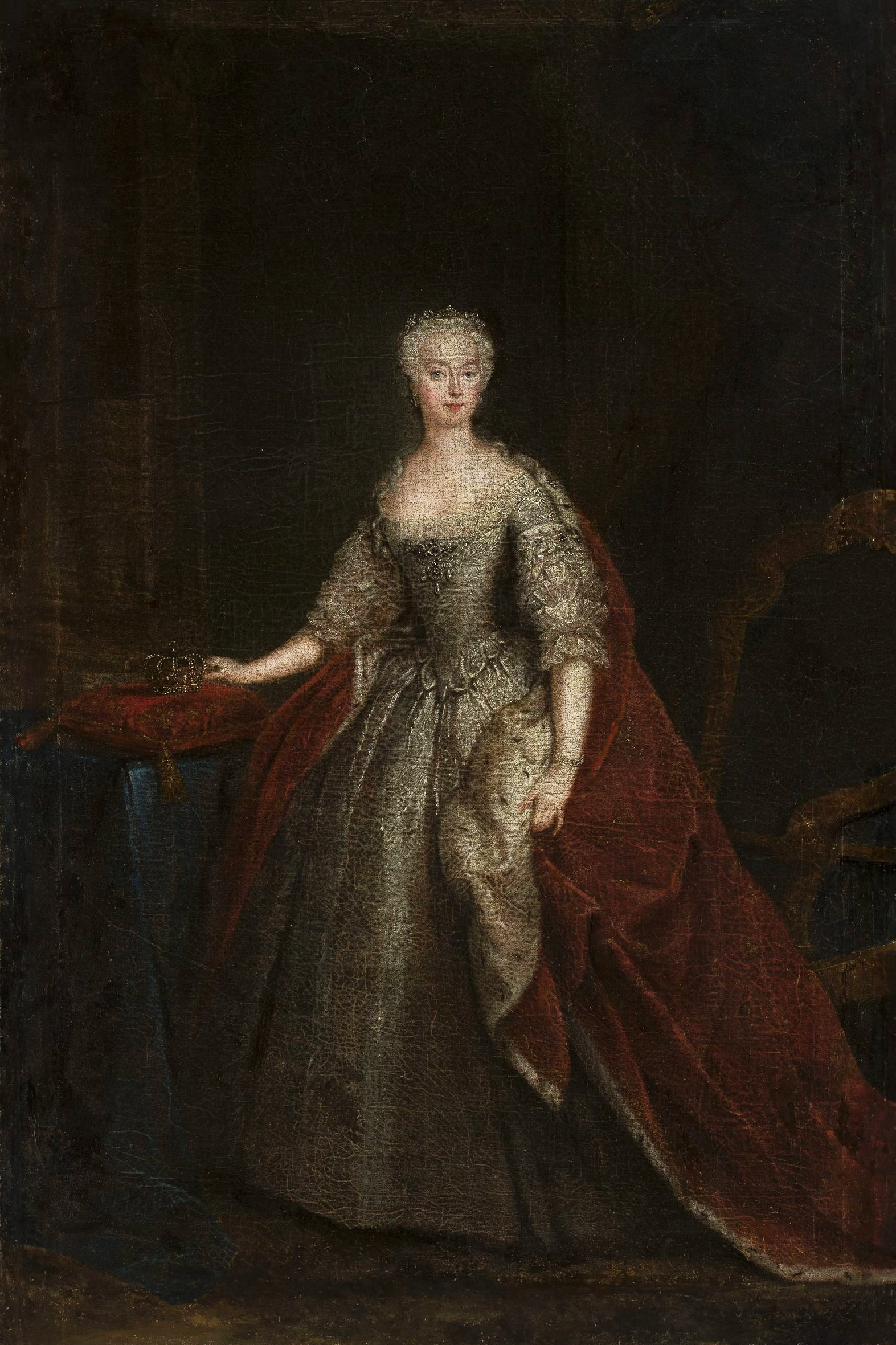
One of the first portraits of Augusta by William Hogarth, 1736–1738

Augusta of Saxe-Gotha left Hellevoetsluis 17 April 1736 and arrived at Greenwich on the royal yacht William and Mary on the 25th, where she was welcomed by her groom. On 27 April 1736, she was escorted to St James's Palace, where she met the rest of the royal family. When she was introduced to the royal family, she made a favourable impression on the King and Queen by throwing herself on the floor before them in a gesture of respect. The wedding ceremony was held at the Royal Chapel inside St. James's Palace the same day (27 April O.S., 8 May N.S.)

During the first year of marriage, Augusta could be seen playing with her doll in the windows of her residence, until her sister-in-law, Princess Caroline, told her to stop. Frederick took advantage of her inexperience when he had his then lover, Lady Archibald Hamilton, employed as her First Lady of the Bedchamber, after convincing Augusta that there was no truth in the rumour of his affair. Augusta and Frederick had nine children, the last born after Frederick's death.

Frederick once stated that he would never allow himself to be influenced by his consort as his father was, and he thus never made Augusta his confidante. He did, however, instruct her to act in accordance with his wishes in his feud with his parents, and on several occasions, Frederick reportedly instructed her to snub them. When she attended the service of the German Lutheran Chapel, for example, which was also attended by the Queen, Frederick instructed Augusta to make sure she always arrived after the Queen, so that she would be forced to push in front of the Queen to reach her place. This eventually made the Queen insist that Augusta should be directed to her place by another entrance, which in turn caused Frederick to instruct Augusta to refuse to enter the Chapel if the Queen had arrived before her.

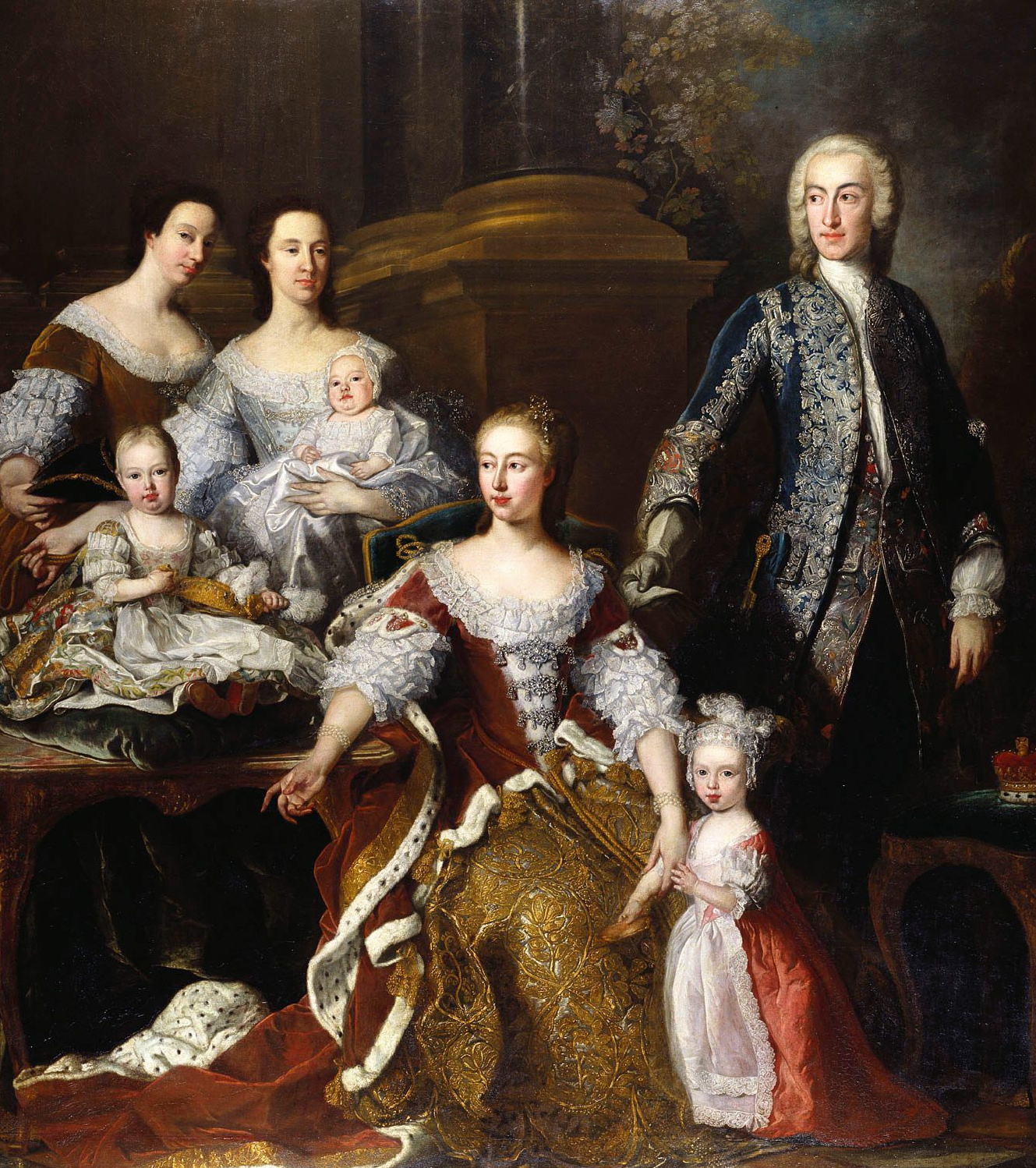
Augusta and her family in 1739, by Jean Baptiste van Loo. Notably, the man standing to her right is not her husband, but William Irby, 1st Baron Boston.

When Augusta's first pregnancy was announced, the Queen stated that she would be sure to witness the birth, to be assured that the pregnancy was indeed genuine. She reportedly wished the succession to pass to her second surviving son, Prince William, Duke of Cumberland. The birth of their first daughter, Princess Augusta, on 31 July 1737, took place at St James's after the Princess of Wales was forced by Frederick to travel from Hampton Court Palace while in labour, to prevent his hated parents from being present at the birth. The delivery was traumatic: St James's Palace was not ready to receive them, no bed was prepared, no sheets could be found, and Augusta was forced to give birth on a tablecloth. Queen Caroline once said of her daughter-in-law and the inconveniences she had inflicted on her: "Poor creature, were she to spit in my face, I should only pity her for being under such a fool's direction, and wipe it off."

The circumstances of the birth of Princess Augusta led to a dispute between the Prince and Princess of Wales and the King and Queen, who were not reconciled until public opinion during the Jacobite rising of 1745 pressured them to. After the reconciliation, the couple became less isolated from high society, allowing courtiers to appear at both courts without giving offence. Augusta made a good impression in society life, where she was described as pretty, elegant, and a gracious hostess. On some occasions, the children of Augusta were made to give amateur theatre performances for their guests, notably on 4 January 1749, when George, Augusta, Elizabeth, Edward and some of their playmates acted in Cato, a Tragedy.

== Princess dowager ==
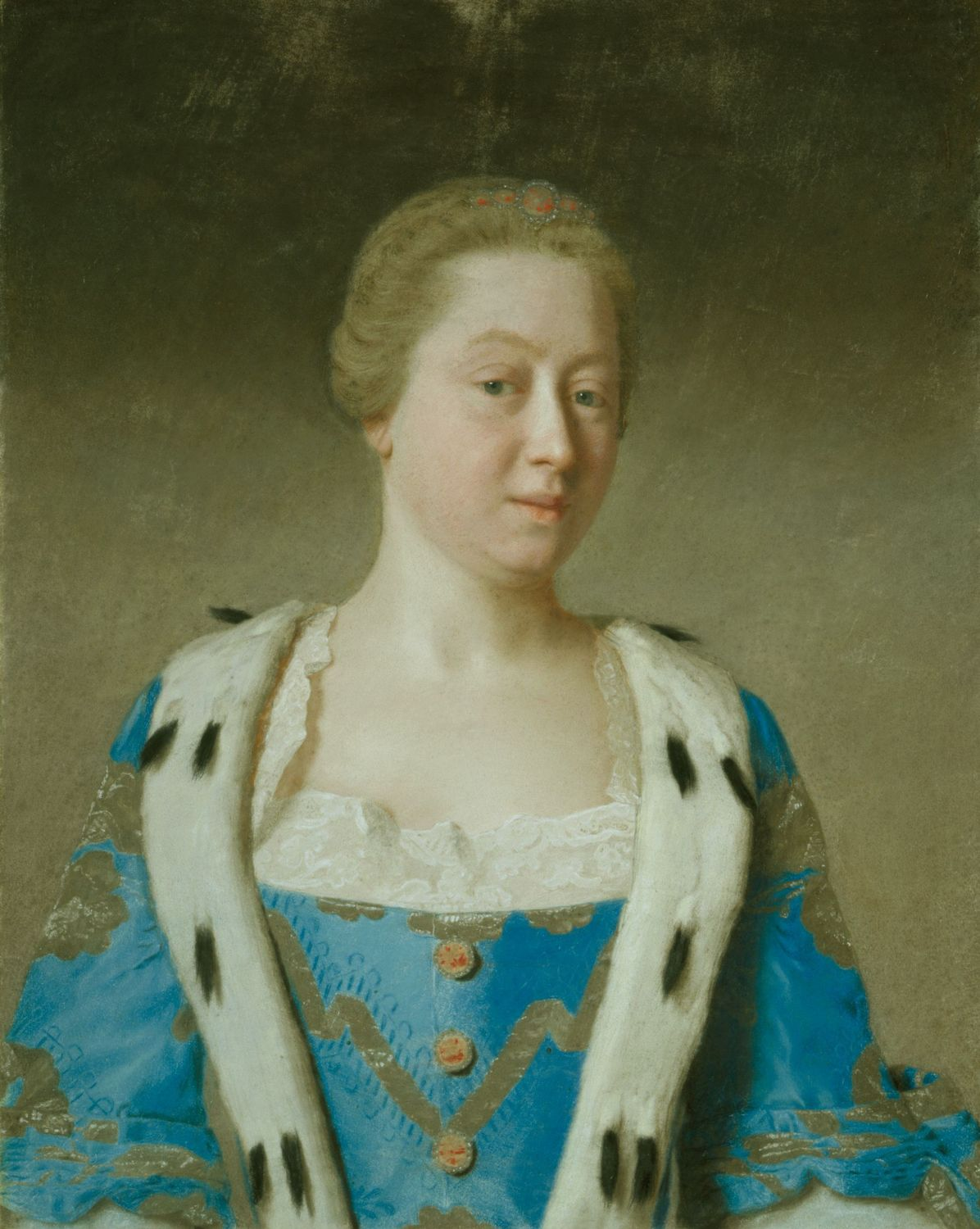
Portrait by Jean-Étienne Liotard, 1754

On 31 March 1751, Frederick unexpectedly died, making Augusta a widow at thirty-two. Dr. Doran described her at the death of her spouse: "She had, throughout her married life exhibited much mental superiority, with great kindness of disposition, and that under circumstances of great difficulty, and sometimes of a character to inflict vexation on the calmest nature. [...] She was then the mother of eight children, expecting shortly to be the mother of a ninth, and she was brought reluctantly to knowledge that their father was no more. It was six in the morning before her attendants could persuade her to retire to bed; but she arose again at eight, and then, with less thought for her grief than anxiety for the honour of him whose death was the cause of it, she proceeded to the Prince's room, and burned the whole of his private papers. By this the world lost some rare supplementary chapters to a Chronique Scandaleuse!"

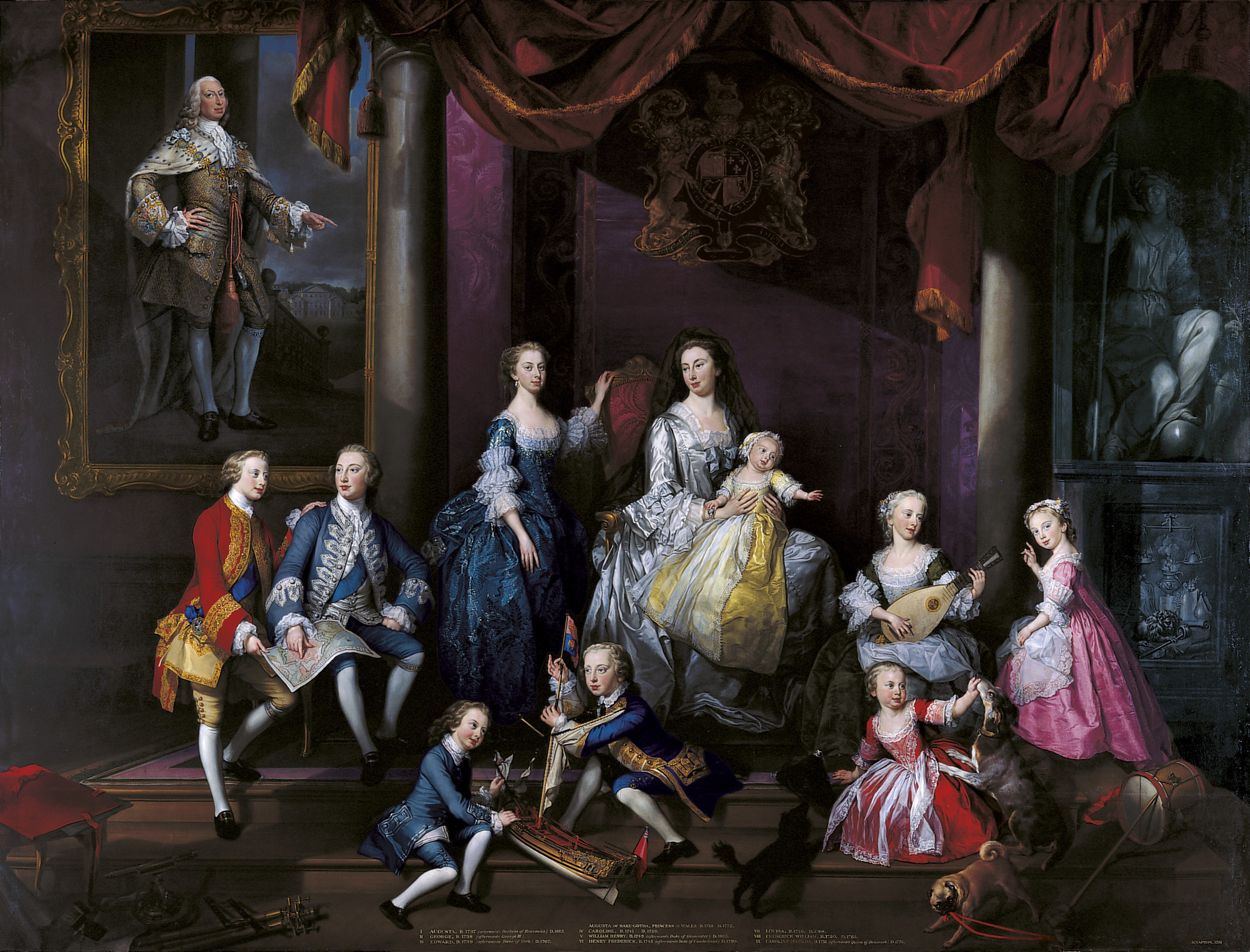
The Family of Frederick, Prince of Wales, a group portrait commissioned from George Knapton by Augusta and completed less than a year after Frederick's death

The King reportedly did not show much feeling upon the death of his son and the funeral was simple. On receiving the King's condolences, Augusta replied that she placed herself and her children upon his mercy and protection, and he was evidently touched by her widowhood and minor children, and was willing to show them consideration. Following Frederick's death, her role as mother of the heir-apparent to the throne became a more prominent one, and she was named prospective regent by the king and the parliament, should the King die during the minority of her eldest son, the Prince of Wales. This caused a controversy and opposition from the Duke of Cumberland, who had expected to be given that role instead.

During the remaining years of the reign of George II, Augusta chose to live in seclusion with her children, devoting herself to their care. The few occasions when she did appear in public, the King gave her the same ceremonial role and honours previously given to the Queen, and she was honoured the same way by the public as well as the court.

However, Augusta suffered a loss of popularity as a widow. She was to be criticised for her manner of raising her children, as she isolated them from the outside world into a secluded family environment, seldom meeting people outside the family.

As her eldest son came of age, the King attempted to arrange a marriage. His favoured choice was a princess of Brunswick-Wolffenbüttel or a princess of Prussia, but Augusta refused, favouring a member of her own family, the House of Saxe-Gotha.

On 25 October 1760, her son succeeded his grandfather as George III. The year after his succession, he married Charlotte of Mecklenburg-Strelitz. Augusta's relationship with her daughter-in-law was not a good one. She reportedly made it difficult for Charlotte to establish social contacts by referring to rigid court etiquette. Furthermore, she initially appointed a large part of Charlotte's court staff, several of whom were suspected of reporting to Augusta about Charlotte's behaviour. When Charlotte turned to her German companions for friends, she was criticised by Augusta for keeping favourites, notably her close confidant Juliane von Schwellenberg.

Augusta had an acknowledged political influence upon her son, who "strove to follow the counsels she gave", and in which he trusted. Reportedly, she was in turn influenced by John Stuart, 3rd Earl of Bute, who was appointed prime minister with her support in 1762. His appointment caused a serious crisis and exposed both Augusta and Bute to such public hostility that Bute had to resign from his post the following year. William Makepeace Thackeray described the public sentiments and the circulating rumours: "Bute was hated with a rage there have been few examples in English history. He was the butt for everybody's abuse; for Wilkes, for Churchill's slashing satire, for the hooting of the mob who roasted his booth, his emblem, in a thousand bonfires; that hated him because he was a favourite and a Scotsman, calling him Mortimer, Lothario, and I know not what names, and accusing his royal mistress of all kinds of names – the grave, lean, demure, elderly woman, who, I dare say, was quite as good as her neighbours. Chatham lent the aide of his great malice to influence the popular sentiment against her. He assailed, in the House of Lords, 'The secret influence, more mighty than the throne itself, which betrayed and dogged every administration'. The most furious pamphlets echoed the cry 'Impeach the King's mother', was scribbled over every wall at the Court end of the town".

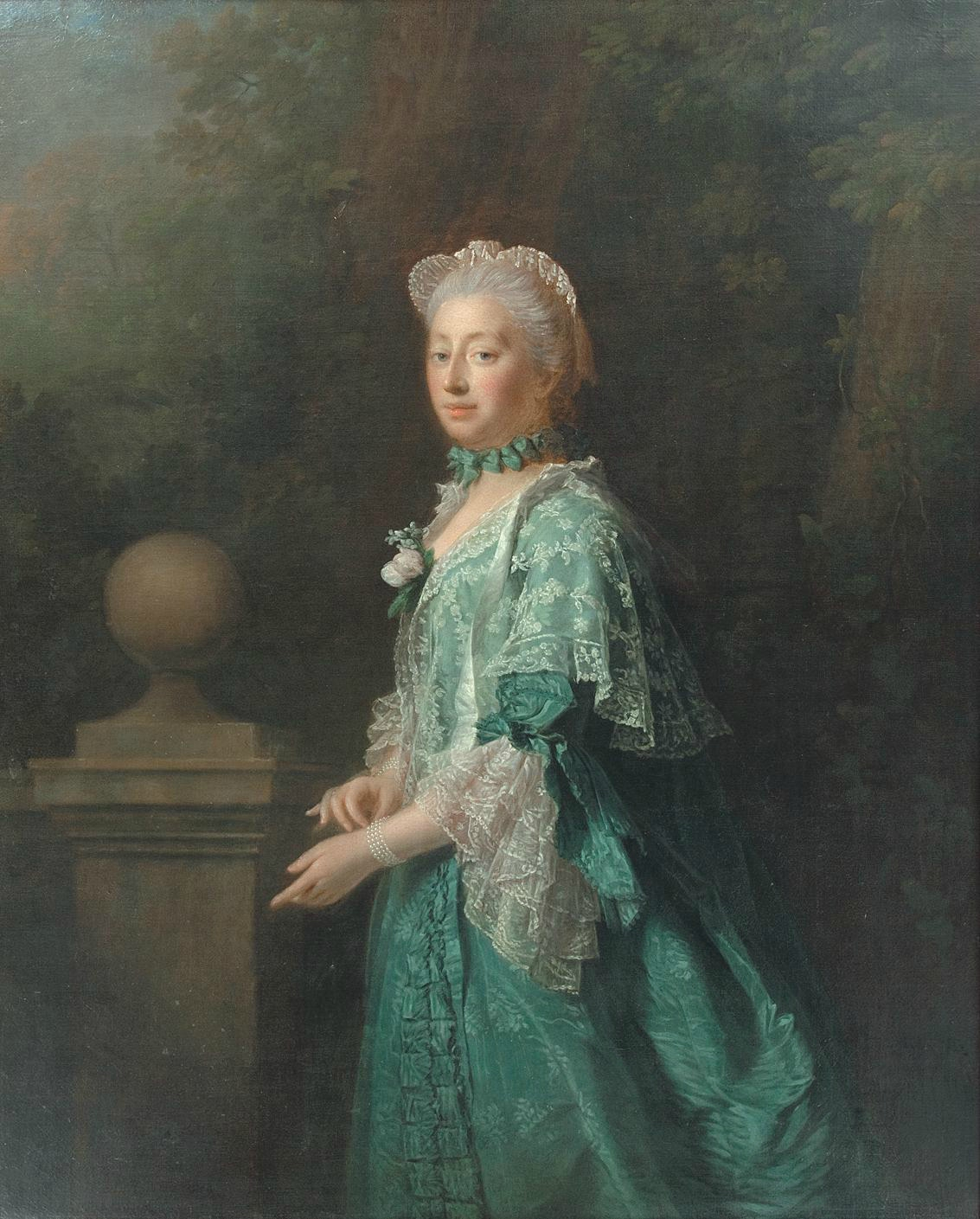
Portrait by Allan Ramsay, 1759

When the King had a first, temporary, bout of mental illness in 1765, Augusta and Lord Bute kept Queen Charlotte unaware of the situation. The Regency Bill of 1765 stated that if the King should become permanently unable to rule, Charlotte was to become Regent. Augusta was suggested as regent, but there was fierce opposition to her appointment, as there were concerns of the influence of Lord Bute in her potential regency, and fears that should she become regent, Bute would de facto rule as "king".

Augusta reportedly resented the marriages of her younger sons, which took place without her consent.

In 1769, the husband of her daughter Caroline Matilda, Christian VII of Denmark, visited Great Britain. During his visit, Augusta, upon the initiative of Caroline Matilda, asked him publicly during a dinner to reinstate Louise von Plessen, a favourite of Caroline Matilda whom Christian had fired, to her position. He answered that he had made a sacred vow never to do so, but that if Caroline Matilda preferred von Plessen's company over his, so be it. In the end, Louise von Plessen was not reinstated, and Augusta apparently asked Caroline Matilda not to press the matter and to show more affection to Christian.

In 1770, rumours about Caroline Matilda, the queen of Denmark, began to circulate. In particular these concerned the mental state of her spouse as well as the fall of prime minister Count Johann Hartwig Ernst von Bernstorff, in which Caroline Matilda was rumoured to have participated. When Augusta visited her eldest daughter in Brunswick that year, she also took the opportunity to see Caroline Matilda, who received her in breeches, which at that time was regarded as scandalous. Upon Augusta's lamentations, her daughter answered: "Pray, madam, allow me to govern my own kingdom as I please!"

Augusta died of throat cancer at the age of 52 at Carlton House, and was buried seven days later at Westminster Abbey.

== Kew Gardens ==
Arms as Princess of Wales

Princess Augusta enlarged and greatly extended Kew Gardens after her husband's death. Sir William Chambers built several garden structures for her. One of these, the lofty Great Pagoda built in 1761, still remains.

== Issue ==
Name	Birth	Death	Notes
Princess Augusta, Duchess of Brunswick	31 July 1737	23 March 1813	Married, 1764, Charles William Ferdinand, Duke of Brunswick-Wolfenbüttel; had issue.
George III	4 June 1738	29 January 1820	Married, 1761, Charlotte of Mecklenburg-Strelitz; had issue.
Prince Edward, Duke of York	25 March 1739	17 September 1767	Died aged twenty-eight, unmarried.
Princess Elizabeth	10 January 1741	4 September 1759	Died aged eighteen, unmarried.
Prince William Henry, Duke of Gloucester	25 November 1743	25 August 1805	Married, 1766, Maria, Countess Waldegrave; had issue.
Prince Henry, Duke of Cumberland	7 November 1745	18 September 1790	Married, 1771, Anne Luttrell; no issue.
Princess Louisa	19 March 1749	13 May 1768	Died aged nineteen, unmarried.
Prince Frederick	13 May 1750	29 December 1765	Died aged fifteen, unmarried.
Caroline Matilda, Queen of Denmark and Norway	11 July 1751	10 May 1775	Married, 1766, Christian VII, King of Denmark and Norway; had issue.

== Legacy ==
Several places in British America were named in her honour:

- Augusta, Georgia
- Augusta County, Virginia
- Fort Augusta, Northumberland County, Pennsylvania

Michelle Fairley portrayed a fictionalised version of Augusta in Queen Charlotte: A Bridgerton Story (2023).

== Ancestors ==
Ancestors of Princess Augusta of Saxe-Gotha

8. Ernest I, Duke of Saxe-Gotha
4. Frederick I, Duke of Saxe-Gotha-Altenburg
9. Princess Elisabeth Sophie of Saxe-Altenburg
2. Frederick II, Duke of Saxe-Gotha-Altenburg
10. Augustus, Duke of Saxe-Weissenfels (= 14)
5. Magdalena Sibylla of Saxe-Weissenfels
11. Anna Maria of Mecklenburg-Schwerin (= 15)
1. Augusta, Princess of Wales
12. John VI, Prince of Anhalt-Zerbst
6. Charles, Prince of Anhalt-Zerbst
13. Sophie Augusta of Holstein-Gottorp
3. Princess Magdalena Augusta of Anhalt-Zerbst
14. Augustus, Duke of Saxe-Weissenfels (= 10)
7. Sophia of Saxe-Weissenfels, Princess of Anhalt-Zerbst
15. Anna Maria of Mecklenburg-Schwerin (= 11)
