= Zerbst Castle =

Castle

- Schloss Zerbst
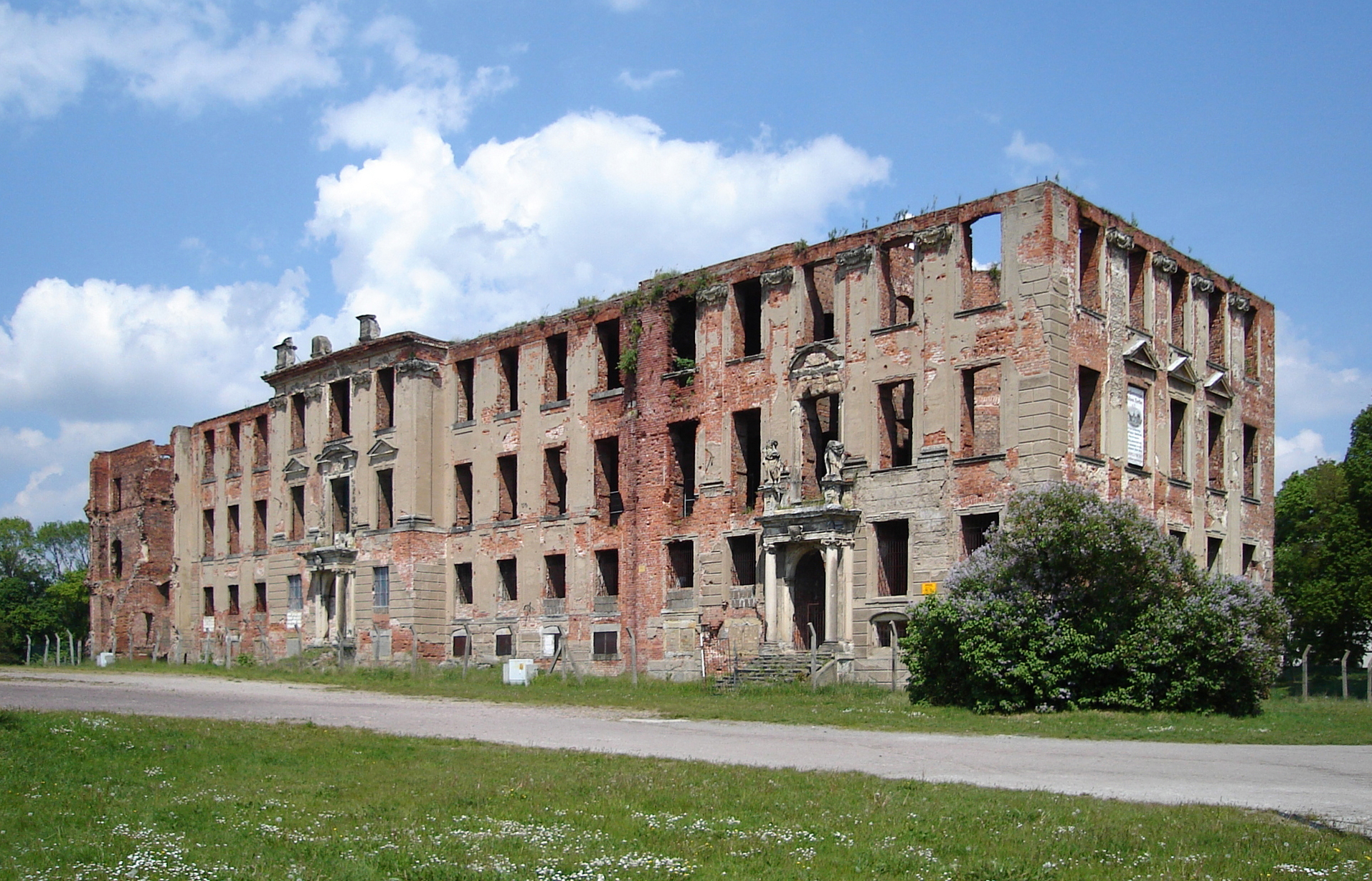
- Ruins of the east wing of the castle in 2005

- Location within Saxony-Anhalt

General information
- Status: Only ruins of the east wing are still standing
- Type: Palace
- Architectural style: Baroque/Rococo
- Location: Zerbst, Germany
- Coordinates: 51.9639°N 12.0818°E
- Construction started: 31 May 1681
- Client: Charles William, Prince of Anhalt-Zerbst

Zerbst Castle (German: Schloss Zerbst) in the town of Zerbst, Saxony-Anhalt, Germany was the residence of the Princes of Anhalt-Zerbst from the late 17th century until the line died out in 1793. It later served as a museum and archive. The building was severely damaged by bombs during the last weeks of World War II and largely demolished afterwards.

Currently a Verein is working to maintain and reconstruct the remaining eastern wing.

== History ==
=== Previous structures ===
The first castle in Zerbst was a Slavic water castle constructed in the 12th century. This structure was first mentioned in a document dated 1196 and consisted of a front castle and a main castle, both surrounded by a wall and a moat. The free-standing bell tower, which today is considered part of the adjacent St. Bartholomew church, was originally part of this castle. Over the centuries, the castle was expanded and renovated. By the 16th century, the complex consisted of a number of individual residences for the various family branches, surrounded by a common castle wall. In 1603, an expensive repair project was initiated, because the castle was in an almost derelict state. The high castle tower was demolished in 1618. The castle survived the Thirty Years' War almost undamaged. However, during the next century maintenance of the building was neglected and by the end of the 17th century the building was largely uninhabitable.

=== Residence of the House of Anhalt-Zerbst ===
Prince Charles William decided to build a modern building as his residence and commissioned the Dutch architect Cornelis Ryckwaert to design this palace. To make room, the northern parts of the old castle were demolished, and the resulting debris was used as backfill in the foundation of the new palace. The southern parts of the old castle were partially integrated into the new palace. The plan was to create a typical Baroque three-wing complex with a cour d'honneur in the center, which was based stylistically on Dutch models. The foundation were laid on 31 May 1681. The shell of the corps de logis was completed in 1689; work on decorations and extensions continued until 1696. The main building of the castle was inaugurated on 23 June 1696. The cost for the project were estimated at this time at 57000taler.

Between 1703 and 1706, Ryckwaert's successor Giovanni Simonetti built the west wing, which included the castle chapel. Construction work on the chapel continued until 1719. In 1721, the central avant-corps was expanded into a castle tower with a Baroque dome. In 1743, the last parts of the old castle were demolished and in 1744, construction of the east wing was begun in the space thus freed. With the completion of the shell of the east wing in 1746, the palace arrived at its intended three-wing from. The new wing was decorated in Frederician Rococo style. It was a childhood home of Catherine the Great (born Princess Sophie of Anhalt-Zerbst) prior to being selected to marry the heir of the Russian Imperial throne in 1744. Construction was halted when in 1758, the ruling Prince Frederick Augustus, Catherine the Great's younger brother, had to flee to Basel due to a dispute with Frederick the Great. At this time, the outside of the east wing had been completed, but the second floor had not been decorated. It would remain in that state until the Castle Museum moved in 1921.

=== Later history ===
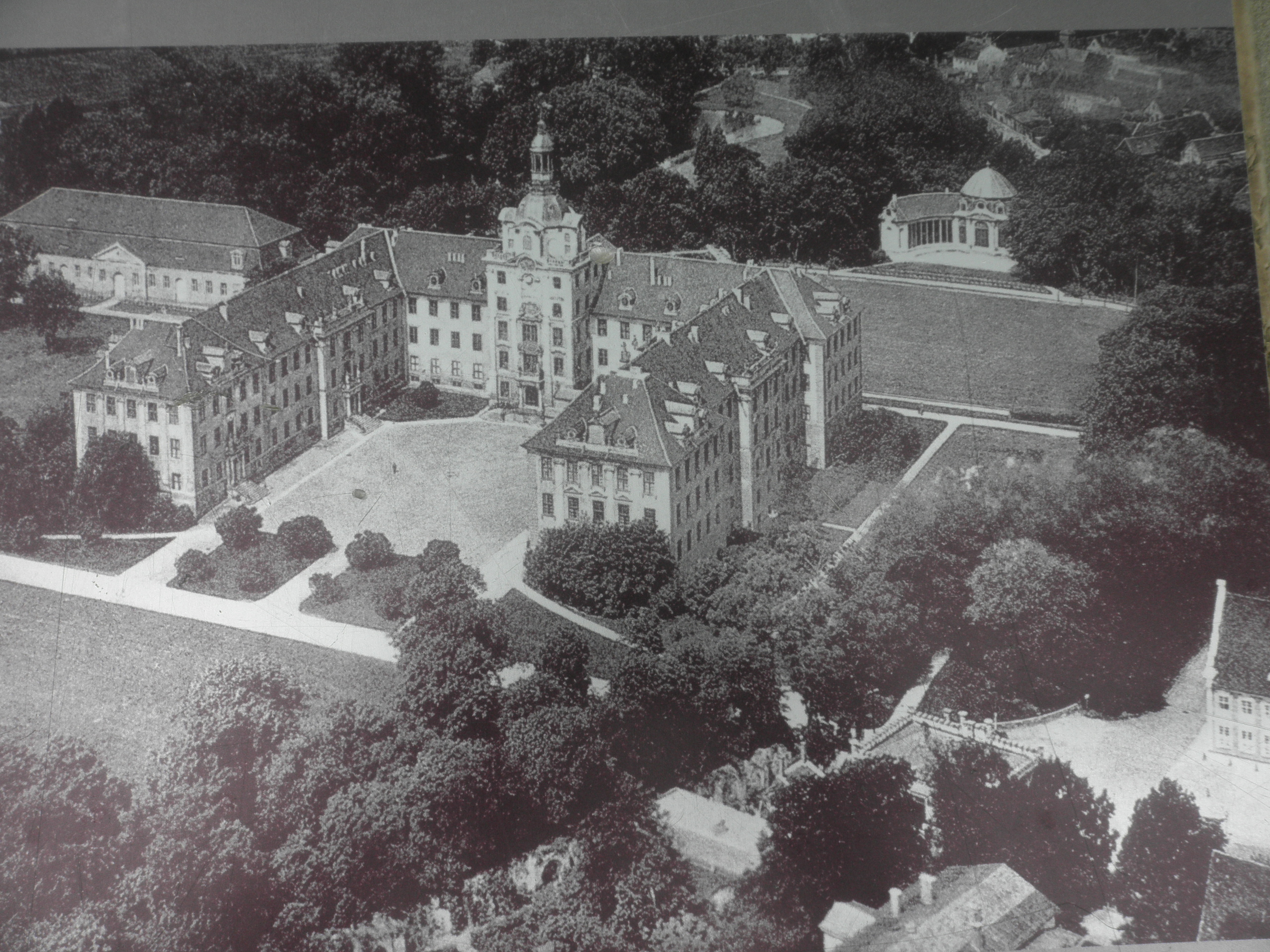
Schloss Zerbst before its destruction

After the Anhalt-Zerbst line of the princely family died out in 1793, the castle mostly stood empty. In 1872, the State Archives and the Ducal House Archive were housed in the corps de logis. In 1881, the tower was destroyed by fire. It was subsequently restored in its old form. In 1921, the Castle Museum was opened in the castle, and some municipal offices, including the town's tax offices, were housed in the empty rooms.

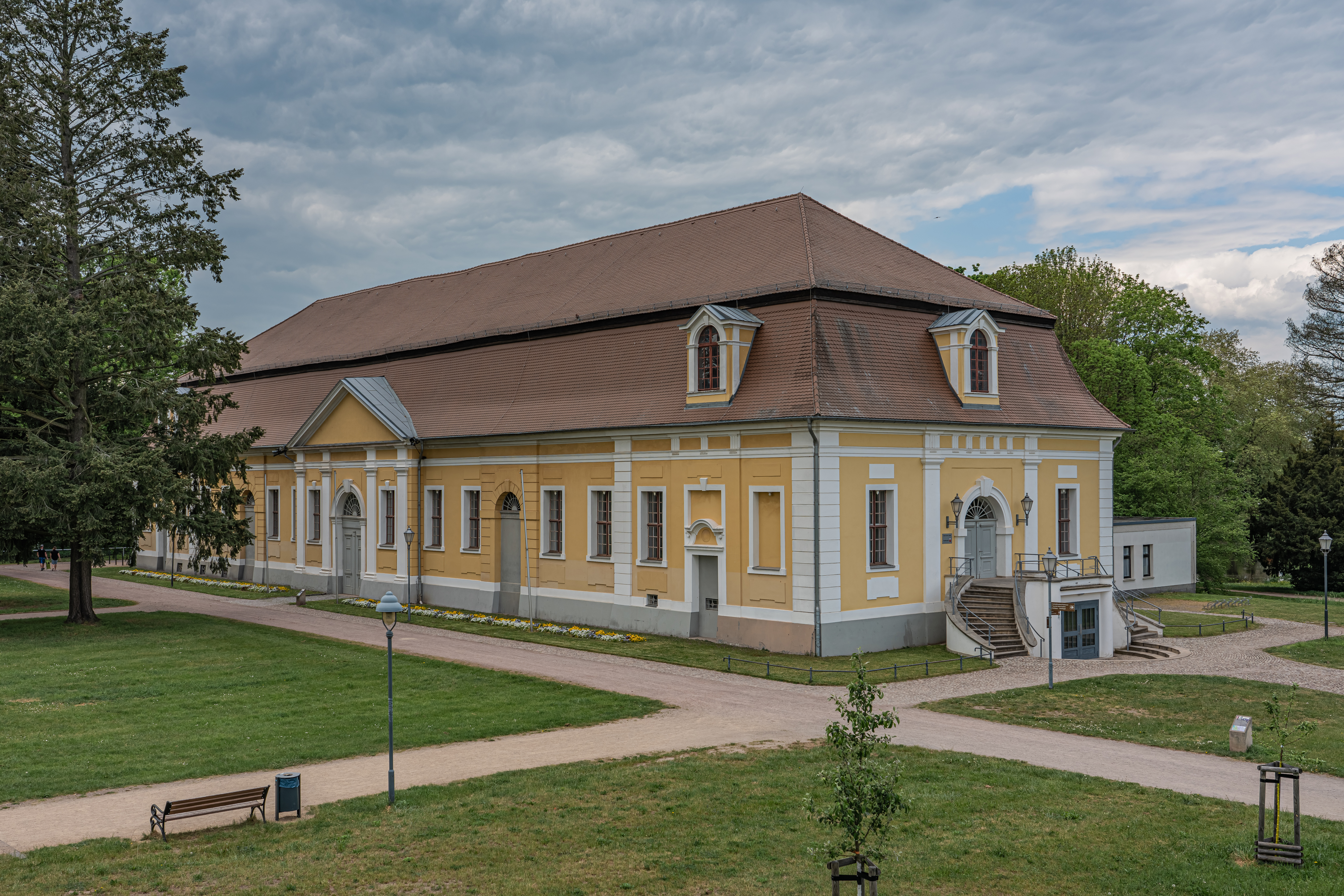
The "riding school", now an indoor arena

On 16 April 1945, the castle was hit by Allied bombs and burned out completely. The valuable interior was destroyed, as well as the exhibits on display in the museum and the documents held in the State Archives. Reconstructing the walls of the castle on the existing foundations would have been possible, but this option was rejected for political reasons by the Communist rulers of post-War Eastern Germany. The corps de logis and the west wing were demolished and only the ruins of the east wing were left standing.

== Description ==
Several reminders of the size and appearance of the castle are still present in the castle grounds. Immediately adjacent to the castle is the former riding school, a Baroque building constructed in 1724, that once served as an indoor arena and is now an indoor event space. Parts of the castle park and some outbuildings remain. The park was created around 1798 as a French formal garden and was later transformed into a landscaped park. The reason for this transformation was that the old Baroque structural elements and lawns were long left to fend for themselves and the original structure was no longer visible.

Of the Schloss itself, only the eastern wing and part of the corps de logis remain today.

== Reconstruction ==
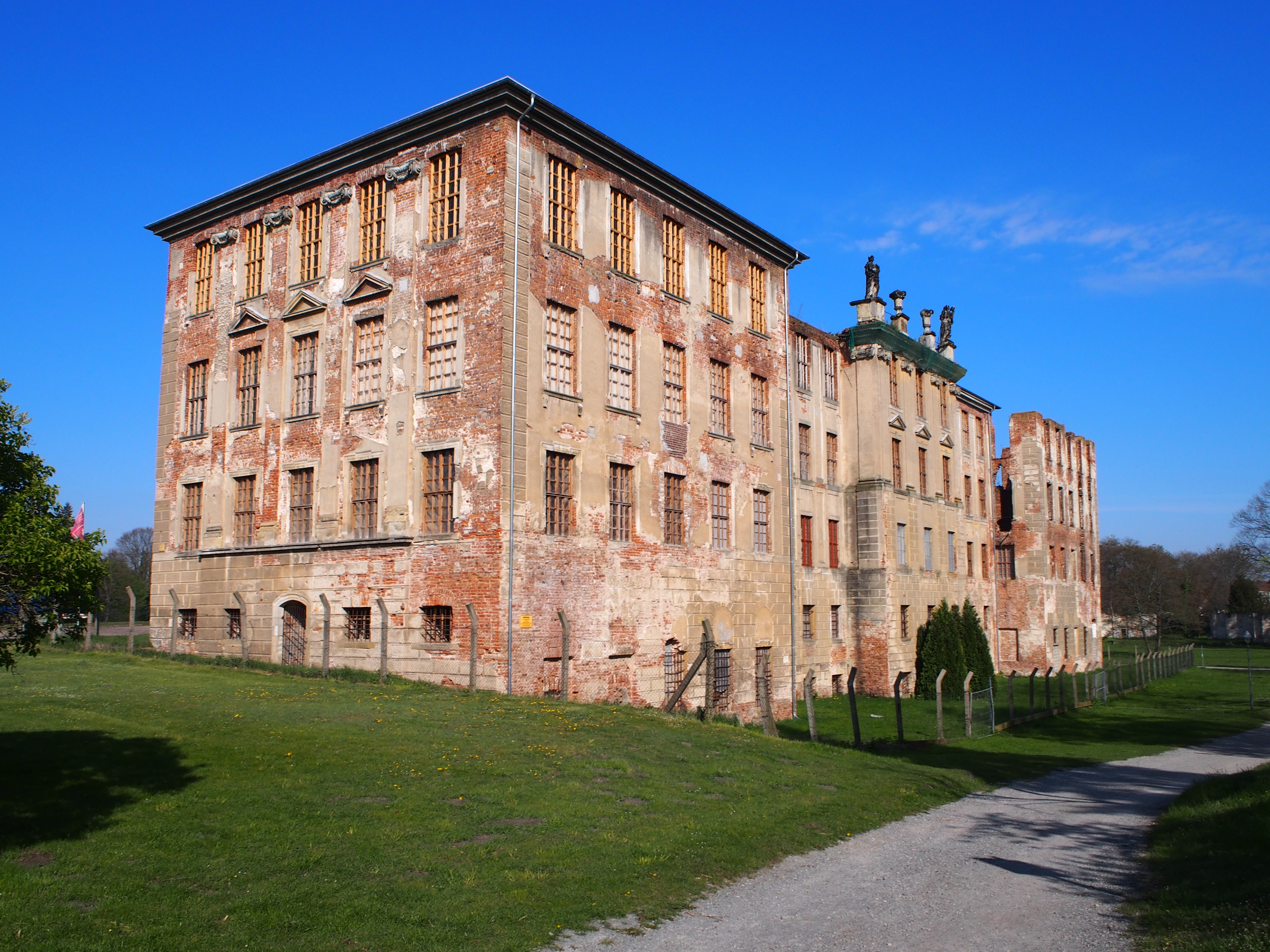
Schloss Zerbst eastern wing in 2017, with partially secured windows and roof

In 2006, the friends of Zerbst Castle began securing and reconstructing the ruins. Their goal is to faithfully restore the appearance of the eastern wing of the castle.
