= Princess Magdalena Augusta of Anhalt-Zerbst =

Magdalena Augusta of Anhalt-Zerbst
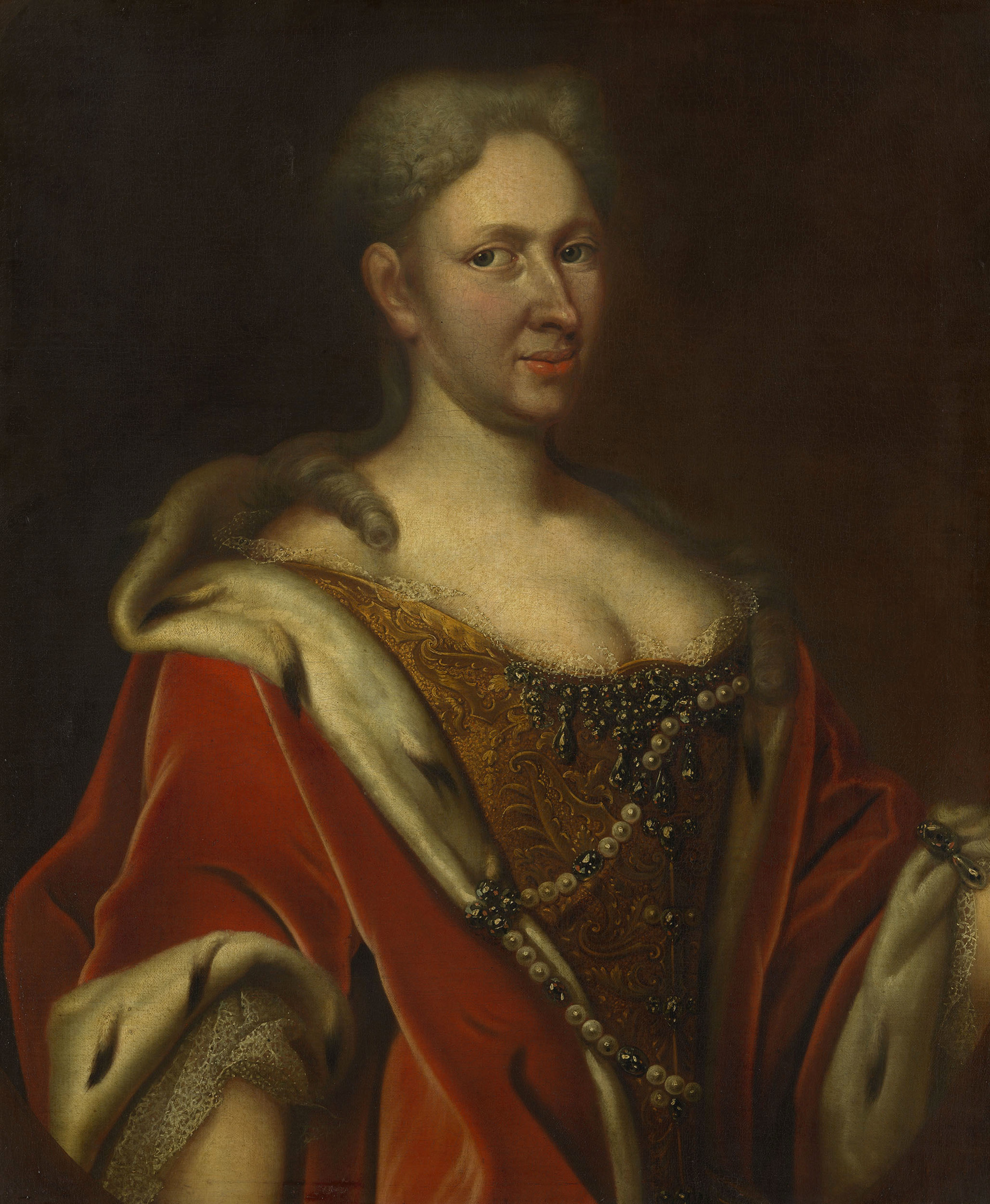
- Portrait of Duchess Magdalena after Christian Schilbach, c. 1720–1740

Duchess consort of Saxe-Gotha-Altenburg
- Tenure: 7 June 1696 – 23 March 1732
- Born: 13 October 1679
- Died: 11 October 1740 (aged 60)
- Spouse: Frederick II (m. 1696; died 1732)
- Issue among others...: Frederick III; Prince William; Prince John August; Fredericka, Duchess of Saxe-Weisselfels; Augusta, Princess of Wales; Prince John Adolf
- House: Saxe-Gotha-Altenburg (by marriage); Ascania (by birth)
- Father: Karl of Anhalt-Zerbst
- Mother: Duchess Sophia of Saxe-Weissenfels

Princess Magdalena Augusta of Anhalt-Zerbst (13 October 1679 – 11 October 1740) was, by birth, a princess of Anhalt-Zerbst and, by marriage, a duchess of Saxe-Gotha-Altenburg. She was the maternal grandmother of George III of the United Kingdom.

She was born Princess Magdalena Augusta of Anhalt-Zerbst. Her father was Karl of Anhalt-Zerbst and her mother was Duchess Sophia of Saxe-Weissenfels.

== Marriage ==
In 1696, Magdalena Augusta married her first cousin, Frederick II, Duke of Saxe-Gotha-Altenburg, who had become duke in 1691. The duchess's letters to her husband, kept in the Gotha library, bear witness to a loving and happy marriage. Magdalena Augusta was constantly pregnant during much of her marriage, giving birth almost once a year, but a large number of her children went on to die in early childhood.

She refused to let her youngest daughter be taught English after she was promised to the presumptive heir to the British throne. She claimed: "[...] this is completely unnecessary, because since the Hanover family has been on the English throne for over twenty years, the people in England and especially at court have to speak German as often and as well as English. "

== Issue ==
Only nine of her nineteen children survived into adulthood:

1. Sophie (b. Gotha, 30 May 1697 – d. of smallpox, Gotha, 29 November 1703), died in early childhood.
2. Frederick III, Duke of Saxe-Gotha-Altenburg (b. Gotha, 14 April 1699 – d. Gotha, 10 March 1772).
3. Stillborn son (Gotha, 22 April 1700).
4. Wilhelm (b. Gotha, 12 March 1701 – d. Gräfentonna, 31 May 1771), married on 8 November 1742 to Anna of Holstein-Gottorp. Their marriage was childless.
5. Karl Frederick (b. Gotha, 20 September 1702 – d. [of smallpox?] Gotha, 21 November 1703), died in early childhood.
6. Stillborn daughter (b. and d. Gotha, 8 May 1703).
7. Johann August (b. Gotha, 17 February 1704 – d. Stadtroda, 8 May 1767).
8. Christian (b. Gotha, 27 February 1705 – d. of smallpox, Gotha, 5 March 1705), died in infancy.
9. Christian Wilhelm (b. Gotha, 28 May 1706 – d. Stadtroda, 19 July 1748), married on 27 May 1743 to Luise Reuss of Schleiz. Their marriage was childless.
10. Ludwig Ernst (b. Gotha, 28 December 1707 – d. Gotha, 13 August 1763)
11. Emanuel (b. Gotha, 5 April 1709 – d. Gotha, 10 October 1710), died in early childhood.
12. Moritz (b. Altenburg, 11 May 1711 – d. Altenburg, 3 September 1777).
13. Sophie (b. Altenburg, 23 August 1712 – d. Altenburg, 12 November 1712), died in infancy.
14. Karl (b. Gotha, 17 April 1714 – d. Gotha, 10 July 1715), died in early childhood.
15. Fredericka (b. Gotha, 17 July 1715 – d. Langensalza, 12 May 1775), married on 27 November 1734 to Johann Adolf II, Duke of Saxe-Weissenfels.
16. Stillborn son (Gotha, 30 November 1716).
17. Magdalena Sibylle (b. Gotha, 15 August 1718 – d. Gotha, 9 November 1718), died in infancy.
18. Augusta (b. Gotha, 30 November 1719 – d. Carlton House, 8 February 1772), married on 8 May 1736 to Frederick, Prince of Wales. They had nine children; their second child later became King George III of Great Britain.
19. Johann Adolf (b. Gotha, 18 May 1721 – d. Friedrichstanneck, 29 April 1799).

== Ancestry ==
Ancestors of Princess Magdalena Augusta of Anhalt-Zerbst

8. Rudolph, Prince of Anhalt-Zerbst
4. John VI, Prince of Anhalt-Zerbst
9. Magdalene of Oldenburg
2. Karl Wilhelm, Prince of Anhalt-Zerbst
10. Frederick III, Duke of Holstein-Gottorp
5. Sophie Augusta, Princess of Holstein-Gottorp
11. Marie Elisabeth of Saxony
1. Magdalena Augusta of Anhalt-Zerbst
12. John George I, Elector of Saxony
6. August, Duke of Saxe-Weissenfels
13. Magdalene Sibylle of Prussia
3. Duchess Sophia of Saxe-Weissenfels
14. Adolf Friedrich I, Duke of Mecklenburg-Schwerin
7. Anna Maria of Mecklenburg-Schwerin
15. Anna Maria of Ostfriesland

Princess Magdalena Augusta of Anhalt-Zerbst House of Ascania Born: 13 October 1679 Died: 11 October 1740
German royalty
Vacant Title last held by Christine of Baden-Durlach	Duchess consort of Saxe-Gotha-Altenburg; 7 June 1696 – 23 March 1732	Succeeded by Luise Dorothea of Saxe-Meiningen
