= Johann Adolf II of Saxe-Weissenfels =

Duke of Saxe-Weissenfels

Johann Adolf II
- Duke of Saxe-Weissenfels
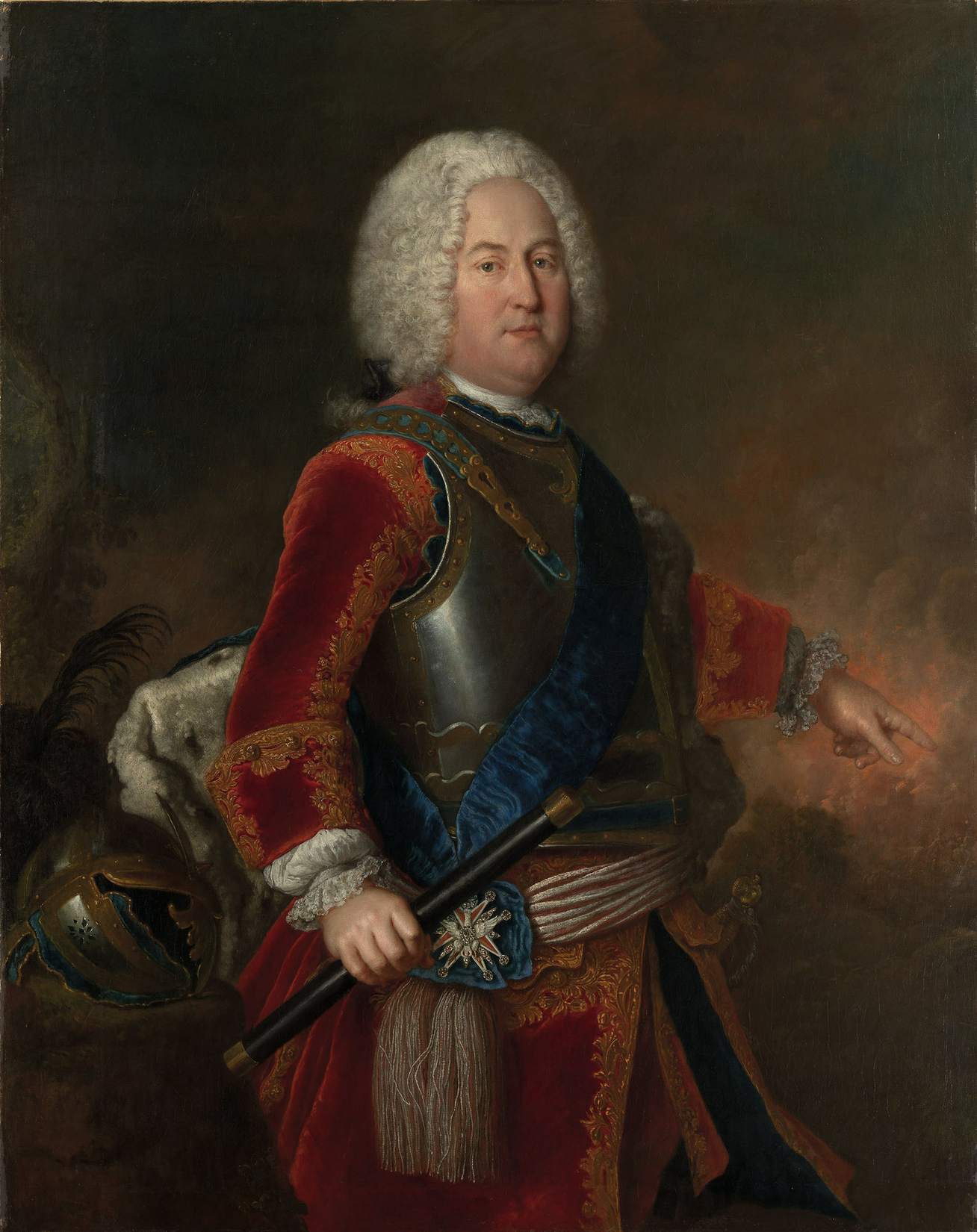
- Portrait by Antoine Pesne, c. 1740–1746

Duke of Saxe-Weissenfels
- Reign: 28 June 1736 – 14 May 1746
- Predecessor: Christian, Duke of Saxe-Weissenfels
- Successor: None (line extinct; territory inherited by Frederick Augustus II, Elector of Saxony)
- Born: 19 August 1685; Weißenfels, Duchy of Saxe-Weissenfels
- Died: 14 May 1746 (aged 60); Leipzig, Electorate of Saxony
- Spouse: Johannette Antoinette Juliane of Saxe-Eisenach (m. 1721) Fredericka of Saxe-Gotha-Altenburg (m. 1734)
- Issue: 6 (all died in infancy or childhood)
- House: Wettin
- Father: Johann Adolf I, Duke of Saxe-Weissenfels
- Mother: Johanna Magdalena of Saxe-Altenburg
- Religion: Lutheran

Johann Adolf II (19 August 1685 – 14 May 1746) was the last duke of Saxe-Weissenfels from 1736 to 1746. Following his death without surviving male issue, the Duchy returned to Electoral Saxony. Johann Adolf was also a commander in the Saxon Army.

== Life ==
Johann Adolf was born in Weissenfels on 19 August 1685, the third surviving son of Johann Adolf I, Duke of Saxe-Weissenfels and his first wife, Johanna Magdalena of Saxe-Altenburg. He inherited the Duchy of Saxe-Weissenfels in 1736, following the death of his older brother Christian, who had no children.

In the War of the Polish Succession, Johann Adolf led Saxon troops into Poland (October 1733). For the next three years, the Saxon army remained mainly in southern Poland, until the coronation of the Elector Frederick August II of Saxony as King of Poland after the defeat of Stanisław Leszczyński, the rival candidate for the Polish throne. That same year, Johann Adolf inherited Saxe-Weissenfels when his brother Christian died without children.

During the Second Silesian War, Prussian troops crossed the Saxon border, and Saxony and Austria agreed to proceed together against Prussia. Saxon troops planned to cut off the Prussians in northern Silesia, while Austrian troops would advance from the south. But in June 1745, they were defeated at the Battle of Hohenfriedberg. Johann Adolf planned a new offensive campaign in September 1745, but he changed his mind two weeks later. Because of this, he was replaced as commander-in-chief by Count Frederick August Rutowski, an illegitimate half-brother of the King-Elector.

After the Battle of Kesselsdorf, the Elector removed his half-brother Rutowski as commander-in-chief and reinstated Johann Adolf, who began his duties as commander on 1 December 1745. Additionally, he was appointed chief of the Saxon government during the absence of the Elector and the Minister Heinrich of Brühl.

Johann Adolf retreated with the Saxon troops to Bohemia. Five months later, he suffered a heart attack and died at age sixty-one.

== Marriages and Issue ==
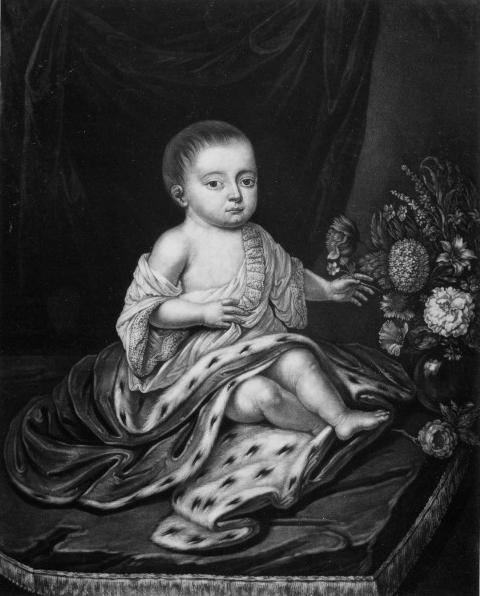
Hereditary Prince Johann Georg Adolf, 1740

In Eisenach on 9 May 1721, Johann Adolf married Johannette Antoinette Juliane of Saxe-Eisenach, daughter of John William III. They had one son who died in early childhood:

1. Frederick Johann Adolf (b. Dahme, 26 May 1722 – d. Dahme, 10 July 1724).

In Altenburg on 27 November 1734, Johann Adolf married for a second time to Fredericka of Saxe-Gotha-Altenburg. They had five children of which only one survived infancy but went on to die later in childhood:

1. Karl Frederick Adolf, Hereditary Prince of Saxe-Weissenfels (b. Weissenfels, 7 June 1736 – d. Weissenfels, 24 March 1737).
2. Johann Adolf, Hereditary Prince of Saxe-Weissenfels (b. Weissenfels, 27 June 1738 – d. Weissenfels, 21 October 1738).
3. August Adolf, Hereditary Prince of Saxe-Weissenfels (b. Weissenfels, 6 June 1739 – d. Weissenfels, 7 June 1740).
4. Johann Georg Adolf, Hereditary Prince of Saxe-Weissenfels (b. Weissenfels, 17 May 1740 – d. Weissenfels, 10 July 1740).
5. Fredericka Adolfine (b. Weissenfels, 27 December 1741 – d. Langensalza, 4 July 1751).

He was the last member of the line of Saxe-Weissenfels. After his death without surviving male heirs, his lands passed to the Electorate of Saxony, from which they had been extracted in 1657 under the terms of the will of John George I, Elector of Saxony.

Johann Adolf II of Saxe-Weissenfels House of Wettin Born: 19 August 1685 Died: 14 May 1746
Preceded by Christian	Duke of Saxe-Weissenfels; 1736–1746	Territory returned to the Electorate of Saxony
