= Sophia of Saxe-Weissenfels, Princess of Anhalt-Zerbst =

Princess of Saxe-Weissenfels and Anhalt-Zerbst

Sophia of Saxe-Weissenfels
- Princess of Anhalt-Zerbst
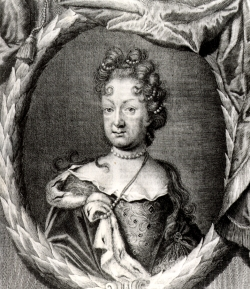
- Late 17th century engraving
- Born: 23 June 1654; Halle an der Saale
- Died: 31 March 1724 (aged 69); Zerbst
- Spouse: Charles, Prince of Anhalt-Zerbst
- Issue: John Augustus, Prince of Anhalt-Zerbst; Magdalena Augusta, Duchess of Saxe-Gotha-Altenburg
- House: House of Wettin
- Father: Augustus, Duke of Saxe-Weissenfels
- Mother: Anna Maria of Mecklenburg-Schwerin

Sophia of Saxe-Weissenfels (also: Sophie; 23 June 1654 in Halle an der Saale – 31 March 1724 in Zerbst) was a member of the Albertine branch of the House of Wettin, and a princess of Saxe-Weissenfels and Querfurt by birth and by marriage Princess of Anhalt-Zerbst.

== Family ==
Sophia was the third daughter of the Duke August of Saxe-Weissenfels and his wife Anna Maria of Mecklenburg-Schwerin, daughter of Duke Adolf Frederick I of Mecklenburg-Schwerin. She was named after her paternal great-grandmother, Sophie of Brandenburg, Electress of Saxony.

== Marriage and issue ==
She married on 18 June 1676 in Halle her first cousin once removed, Charles William, a son of her paternal first cousin Sophie Augusta of Holstein-Gottorp and John VI, Prince of Anhalt-Zerbst. Unlike most royal couples of the era, Charles William and Sophia shared a bedroom in their new baroque palace. This suggests that they may have married out of love.

They had the following children:

- John Augustus (1677–1742), Prince of Anhalt-Zerbst
- Charles Augustus (born 2 July 1678 in Zerbst; died 1 September 1693 ibid), Prince of Anhalt-Zerbst
- Magdalena Augusta (1679–1740), Princess of Anhalt-Zerbst

married Frederick II, Duke of Saxe-Gotha-Altenburg

== Death and burial ==
Sophia died at the age of 69 years in her rooms at Zerbst Castle and was buried on 7 June 1724 in the princely tomb in the St. Bartholomew's Church in Zerbst. In 1899 Duke Duke Frederick I of Anhalt, ordered the implementation of a princely family vault in the Castle Church in Zerbst Castle. After the destruction of the castle in 1945, the remains of the damaged coffins were transferred back to St. Bartholomew.

== External links and sources ==
- Publications by or about Sophia of Saxe-Weissenfels, Princess of Anhalt-Zerbst at VD 17
- Johann Hübner's ... Three hundred and thirty-three Genealogical Tables, Table 170
- Schloss-Zerbst.de
