= Frederick II of Saxe-Gotha-Altenburg =

Duke of Saxe-Gotha-Altenburg from 1691 to 1732

Frederick II
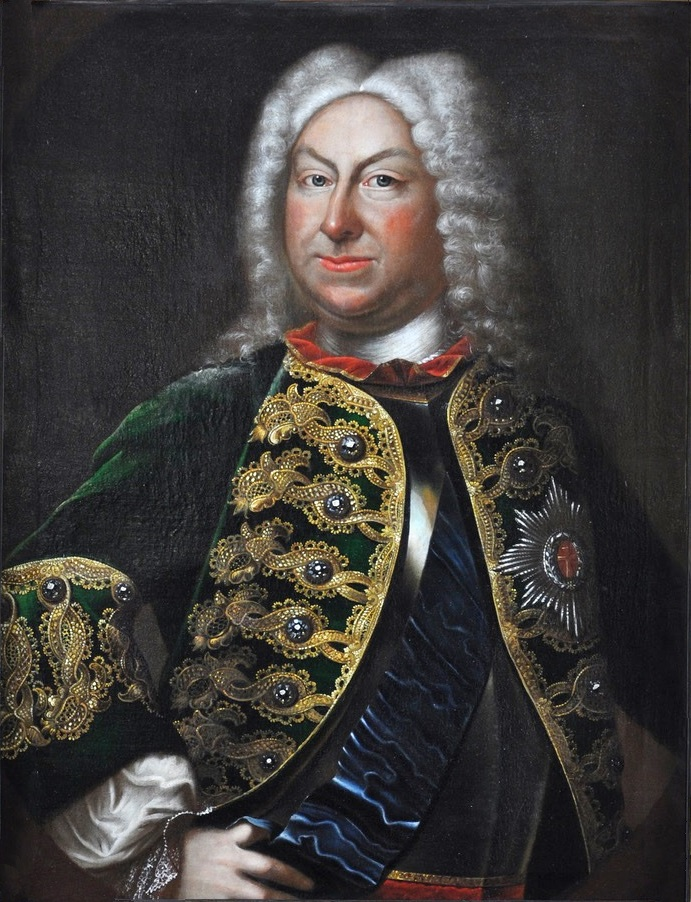

Duke of Saxe-Gotha-Altenburg
- Reign: 2 August 1691 – 23 March 1732
- Predecessor: Frederick I
- Successor: Frederick III
- Regent: Bernhard I and Heinrich
- Born: 28 July 1676; Gotha, Duchy of Saxe-Gotha, Holy Roman Empire
- Died: 23 March 1732 (aged 55); Altenburg, Duchy of Saxe-Gotha-Altenburg, Holy Roman Empire
- Burial: Friedenstein Palace
- Spouse: Princess Magdalena Augusta of Anhalt-Zerbst (m. 1696)
- Issue among others...: Frederick III; Prince William; Prince John August; Fredericka, Duchess of Saxe-Weisselfels; Augusta, Princess of Wales; Prince John Adolf
- House: Saxe-Gotha-Altenburg
- Father: Frederick I, Duke of Saxe-Gotha-Altenburg
- Mother: Magdalena Sibylle of Saxe-Weissenfels
- Religion: Lutheran

Frederick II, Duke of Saxe-Gotha-Altenburg (28 July 1676 – 23 March 1732), was a duke of Saxe-Gotha-Altenburg.

== Life ==
He was born in Gotha as the fifth child and first son of Frederick I, Duke of Saxe-Gotha-Altenburg and Magdalena Sibylle of Saxe-Weissenfels.

After the death of his father, in 1691, Frederick II assumed the duchy of Saxe-Gotha-Altenburg.

Because he was still underage, a guardianship and co-regency was formed by his uncles, Bernhard I of Saxe-Meiningen and Heinrich of Saxe-Römhild. In 1693, after he returned from a journey to Holland and England, he wrote to the Holy Roman Emperor for a license of adult age and took independent control of the government of his duchy. Frederick was a splendor-loving baroque ruler; maintaining his court and standing army, which he had taken over from his father and even expanded, devoured a considerable amount of his income. As a solution, Frederick hired out his soldiers to foreign princes, which caused him great difficulties in 1702, when King Louis XIV of France hired his troops and used them in his war against the emperor.

Relating to domestic affairs, Frederick essentially continued the policy of his father. He founded an orphanage in Altenburg (1715), a workhouse and a lunatic asylum in Kahla (1726), as well as the Magdalenenstift - in honor of his mother and wife (who both had the same name) (1705), an endowment for unmarried noblewomen. For 100,000 thaler from his private property, he bought the famous numismatic collection of Prince Anton Günther of Schwarzburg Arnstadt, which formed the basis of the current collection of coins (Münzkabinetts) at Schloss Friedenstein.

Despite the fact that the minimum age for membership had just been raised to 30, he was appointed member of the Danish Order of the Elephant in 1694. Before, he had ignored the obligation to send back the order's insignia that had been handed out to his father in 1678. He was nevertheless the first out of six knights that were appointed right after the reform of the order's statutes.

By accumulation of parts of Saxe-Coburg (dissolved in 1699), Saxe-Eisenberg (dissolved in 1707) and Saxe-Römhild (dissolved in 1710), he succeeded to all, however only after long hereditary disputes with the other Ernestine duchies, which only ended in 1735 with an arbitral award of the emperor finally ending and reaching in each case area increases for his country. He died in Altenburg.

== Issue ==
At Friedenstein Castle in Gotha on 7 June 1696, he married his first cousin, Magdalena Augusta of Anhalt-Zerbst.
They had nineteen children of which only nine survived into adulthood:

1. Sophie (b. Gotha, 30 May 1697 – d. of smallpox, Gotha, 29 November 1703), died in early childhood.
2. Frederick III, Duke of Saxe-Gotha-Altenburg (b. Gotha, 14 April 1699 – d. Gotha, 10 March 1772).
3. Stillborn son (Gotha, 22 April 1700).
4. Wilhelm (b. Gotha, 12 March 1701 – d. Gräfentonna, 31 May 1771), married on 8 November 1742 to Anna of Holstein-Gottorp. Their marriage was childless.
5. Karl Frederick (b. Gotha, 20 September 1702 – d. [of smallpox?] Gotha, 21 November 1703), died in early childhood.
6. Stillborn daughter (b. and d. Gotha, 8 May 1703).
7. Johann August (b. Gotha, 17 February 1704 – d. Stadtroda, 8 May 1767).
8. Christian (b. Gotha, 27 February 1705 – d. of smallpox, Gotha, 5 March 1705), died in infancy.
9. Christian Wilhelm (b. Gotha, 28 May 1706 – d. Stadtroda, 19 July 1748), married on 27 May 1743 to Luise Reuss of Schleiz. Their marriage was childless.
10. Ludwig Ernst (b. Gotha, 28 December 1707 – d. Gotha, 13 August 1763), died unmarried and without issue.
11. Emanuel (b. Gotha, 5 April 1709 – d. Gotha, 10 October 1710), died in early childhood.
12. Moritz (b. Altenburg, 11 May 1711 – d. Altenburg, 3 September 1777), never married and died without issue.
13. Sophie (b. Altenburg, 23 August 1712 – d. Altenburg, 12 November 1712), died in infancy.
14. Karl (b. Gotha, 17 April 1714 – d. Gotha, 10 July 1715), died in early childhood.
15. Fredericka (b. Gotha, 17 July 1715 – d. Langensalza, 12 May 1775), married on 27 November 1734 to Johann Adolf II, Duke of Saxe-Weissenfels.
16. Stillborn son (Gotha, 30 November 1716).
17. Magdalena Sibylle (b. Gotha, 15 August 1718 – d. Gotha, 9 November 1718), died in infancy.
18. Augusta (b. Gotha, 30 November 1719 – d. Carlton House, 8 February 1772), married on 8 May 1736 to Frederick, Prince of Wales. They had nine children; their second child later became King George III of Great Britain.
19. Johann Adolf (b. Gotha, 18 May 1721 – d. Friedrichstanneck, 29 April 1799).

== Ancestry ==
Ancestors of Frederick II of Saxe-Gotha-Altenburg

8. John II, Duke of Saxe-Weimar
4. Ernest I, Duke of Saxe-Gotha
9. Dorothea Maria of Anhalt
2. Frederick I, Duke of Saxe-Gotha-Altenburg
10. Johann Philipp, Duke of Saxe-Altenburg
5. Elisabeth Sophie of Saxe-Altenburg
11. Elisabeth of Brunswick-Wolfenbüttel
1. Frederick II, Duke of Saxe-Gotha-Altenburg
12. John George I, Elector of Saxony
6. August, Duke of Saxe-Weissenfels
13. Magdalene Sibylle of Prussia
3. Magdalena Sibylle of Saxe-Weissenfels
14. Adolf Frederick I, Duke of Mecklenburg-Schwerin
7. Anna Maria of Mecklenburg-Schwerin
15. Anna Maria of Ostfriesland

Frederick II of Saxe-Gotha-Altenburg House of Wettin Born: 28 July 1676 Died: 23 March 1732
Preceded by Frederick I	Duke of Saxe-Gotha-Altenburg; 1691–1732	Succeeded by Frederick III
