= Charles, Prince of Anhalt-Zerbst =

German prince

Charles William
- Prince of Anhalt-Zerbst
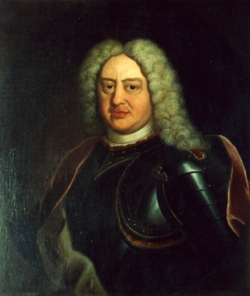
- Born: 16 October 1652; Zerbst, Principality of Anhalt-Zerbst
- Died: 3 November 1718 (aged 66); Zerbst
- Spouse: Duchess Sophia of Saxe-Weissenfels
- Issue: John Augustus, Prince of Anhalt-Zerbst; Magdalena Augusta, Duchess of Saxe-Gotha-Altenburg
Names
- Karl Wilhelm
- House: Ascania
- Father: John VI, Prince of Anhalt-Zerbst
- Mother: Sophie Augusta of Holstein-Gottorp

Charles William, Prince of Anhalt-Zerbst (16 October 1652 in Zerbst – 3 November 1718 in Zerbst), was a German prince of the House of Ascania and ruler of the Principality of Anhalt-Zerbst.

He was the third (but eldest surviving) son of John VI, Prince of Anhalt-Zerbst, and Sophie Auguste, daughter of Frederick III, Duke of Schleswig-Holstein-Gottorp. His two older brothers died before his birth.

== Life ==
Charles William succeeded his father in Anhalt-Zerbst in 1667 at the age of fifteen. During his minority, which lasted until 1674, his mother, the Dowager Princess Sophie Auguste, acted as regent.

He ordered the building of Zerbst Castle (which was made his official residence) and the St. Trinitatis Church of Zerbst, which were both inaugurated in 1696. Also, he lived many years in Jever.

== Marriage and issue ==
In Halle on 18 June 1676 Charles William married Sophie, daughter of August, Duke of Saxe-Weissenfels. They had three children :

1. John Augustus, Prince of Anhalt-Zerbst (b. Zerbst, 29 July 1677 – d. Zerbst, 7 November 1742).
2. Karl Frederick (b. Zerbst, 2 July 1678 – d. Zerbst, 1 September 1693).
3. Magdalene Auguste (b. Zerbst, 23 October 1679 – d. Altenburg, 11 October 1740), married on 17 June 1696 to Frederick II, Duke of Saxe-Gotha-Altenburg; she was the grandmother of King George III of Great Britain.

Charles, Prince of Anhalt-Zerbst House of Ascania Born: 16 October 1652 Died: 3 November 1718
Preceded by John VI	Prince of Anhalt-Zerbst; 1667–1718	Succeeded by John Augustus
