= Louise Stolberg =

Danish salon hostess, playwright, and letter writer (1746–1824)

Countess Frederikke Louise von Stolberg, previously known as Luise von Gramm (August 21, 1746–November 29, 1824) was a Danish saloniste, playwright and letter writer. She is attributed with a certain degree of political influence upon various power holders in the policy of Denmark and Germany; she participated in the 1784 coup in Denmark. Her preserved correspondence is regarded as a valuable historic source about the courtiers of the Danish royal court of her time.

== Life ==
She was born to Count Christian Ditlev Reventlow (1710-1775) and his first wife, Baroness Johanne Sophie Frederikke von Bothmer (1718-1754).

=== Court life ===
In 1761, she married the courtier nobleman Christian Frederik von Gram (1737-1768).

The social position of her first spouse made her a participator in Danish Royal Court life. She was one of the few people Queen Caroline Matilda befriended prior to the banishment of her favorite Louise von Plessen. Reportedly, Gramm acted as a form of channel between the queen in her isolation with Louise von Plessen, and the other female courtiers: she informed the queen what the women of the court said about her, and then informed the women of the court what the queen said about them, which for a time gave her an influential position until her method was discovered. For a time, she and her spouse were regarded as important people because of her favor with the queen.

In 1768, she became a widow and retired for a year of mourning. When she returned, she lost her favor with the queen because of her dislike of the queen's circle of friends, Elisabet von Eyben, Anna Sofie von Bülow, Johanne Marie de Malleville and Christine Sophie von Gähler, whom she considered immoral, and because of her refusal to participate in the queen's attempt to have the king's favorite Conrad Holck (1745-1800) exiled. She retired from court life in 1771.

=== Culture personality ===
In 1776, she remarried Count Christian of Stolberg-Stolberg (1748-1821). In 1777, Stolberg became county governor of Tremsbüttel in Holstein. Her second marriage was a love match; the couple married for mutual love and became very happy, though poor and childless. Until 1797, they lived in Tremsbüttel in Holstein, where her spouse was a local administrator and where she hosted a salon described as a centre for the German-Danish cultural world. She corresponded with many of the leading figures within the literal and political world in Denmark and Germany, among them Goethe. She also wrote a play, Emil (1782).

She was an advisor to her brothers, the politicians Christian Ditlev Frederik Reventlow and Johan Ludvig Reventlow, and contributed in the preparations of the coup of 1784, which deposed the Danish regency and brought the Bernstorff-Reventlow-Schimmelmann party to power.

She is interred in Horslunde Graveyard on Lolland.

== See also ==
- Charlotte Schimmelman
- Ida Hedevig Moltke
