= Elisabet von Eyben =

Danish courtier (1745–1780)

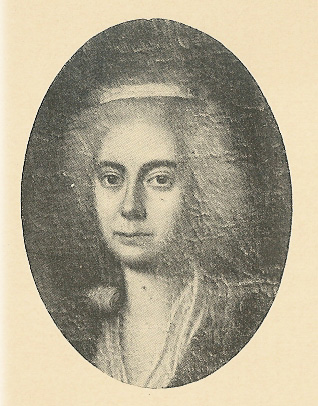
Elisabet von Eyben

Elisabet von Eyben (1745–1780), was a Danish courtier, lady in waiting to the queen consort of Denmark, Caroline Matilda of Great Britain, from 1766 until 1771. She was the queen's confidante in her love affair with Johann Friedrich Struensee but was fired in 1771 because of rivalry between her and the queen about Struensee. After the fall of Struensee, von Eyben gave testimony that seriously damaged the cause of the queen during the divorce.

== Life ==
Elisabet von Eyben was born to the German nobles Christian August von Eyben and Sofie Marie von Hassbergen. She was raised at the Protestant convent of St. John in Slesvig from the age of one. In 1760, she was given a position at the Royal Danish court.

=== Courtier of Caroline Matilda ===
In 1766, she was appointed one of the ladies-in-waiting of the new queen upon the recommendation of Louise von Plessen. She was given the position of Kammerfrøken (senior maid of honour), which was the second highest rank among the ladies-in-waiting of the queen: after the senior lady in waiting Louise von Plessen in rank, and before the group of hofffroken (maid of honour).

von Eyben was reportedly an influential confidante of the queen. The letter writer Luise Gramm accused her of being a bad influence upon the queen: it was she who convinced her to ride astride in male attire and dance and flirt alongside Anna Sofie Bülow, Christine Sophie von Gähler and Johanne Marie Malleville. She had an affair with the courtier count Christian Frederik Moltke, the spouse of Ida Hedevig Moltke, who in turn had an affair with the Spanish envoy Sebastian de Llano y la Quadra.

During the absence of the king in 1768–69, there were rumors about the queen and a certain La Tour, a handsome actor and singer from the court theater Hofteatret, which employed a French language theater troupe in 1767–1773. La Tour was the lover of Elisabet von Eyben, but he was noted to receive gifts from "a higher hand" and it was said that his visits to von Eyben's chamber was in fact visits to the queen. This alleged affair is not considered to have been true, but La Tour was exiled after the return of the king, perhaps because the rumor was damaging enough in itself.

In the summer of 1770, the king and queen made a tour through the Duchies of Schlesvig-Holstein toward the German border, accompanied by Struensee. During the trip, the queen and Struensee was observed to behave in a suspect manner toward each other, and rumors started spreading that they were lovers. Elisabet von Eyben was sent back to the capital during the trip, which attracted attention. She was fired by the queen the following year, and settled in Germany, where she lived on her pension as a retired courtier.

=== Testimony ===
During the process against the queen and Struensee in 1772, Elisabet von Eyben was called to give testimony. She gave her testimony in writing from her absence in Lübeck, and it was damaging to the queen's cause.

Elisabet von Eyben was accused to have convinced the queen to accept treatment by Struensee when he was recommended to her by the king. The queen's lawyer Uldall claimed that von Eyben had an affair with Struensee at the time and that she had encouraged the queen to commit adultery with him, and assisted them in their love affair. Her dismissal was reportedly because of the queen's jealousy toward her because of Struensee. Elisabet von Eyben herself claimed that the king had himself taken the doctor to the queen. She stated that she had witnessed how the queen left a masked ball in January 1770 and made a long visit alone in the room of Struensee. Not long after, the queen had confided in her: Caroline Matilda had told her, that her chamber maids had informed her that there were rumors of her affair with the doctor, that the queen dowagers were aware of it, and that she should ask Bernstorff to exile Struensee. When Caroline Matilda told Struensee, he advised her to confess to the maids and then bribe them, but she refused, and instead choose Elisabet von Eyben to be her confidante in the affair.
