= Order of Mathilde =

Danish royal order

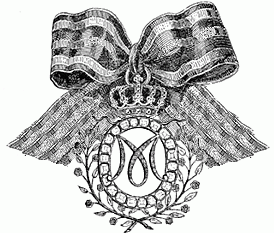
- Badge and sash of the order

Awarded by Caroline Mathilde, Queen of Denmark
- Type: Chivalric order in one class
- Established: January 27, 1771
- Status: Disestablished
- Grades: Member

Statistics
- Total inductees: 12
- Order of Mathilde ribbon

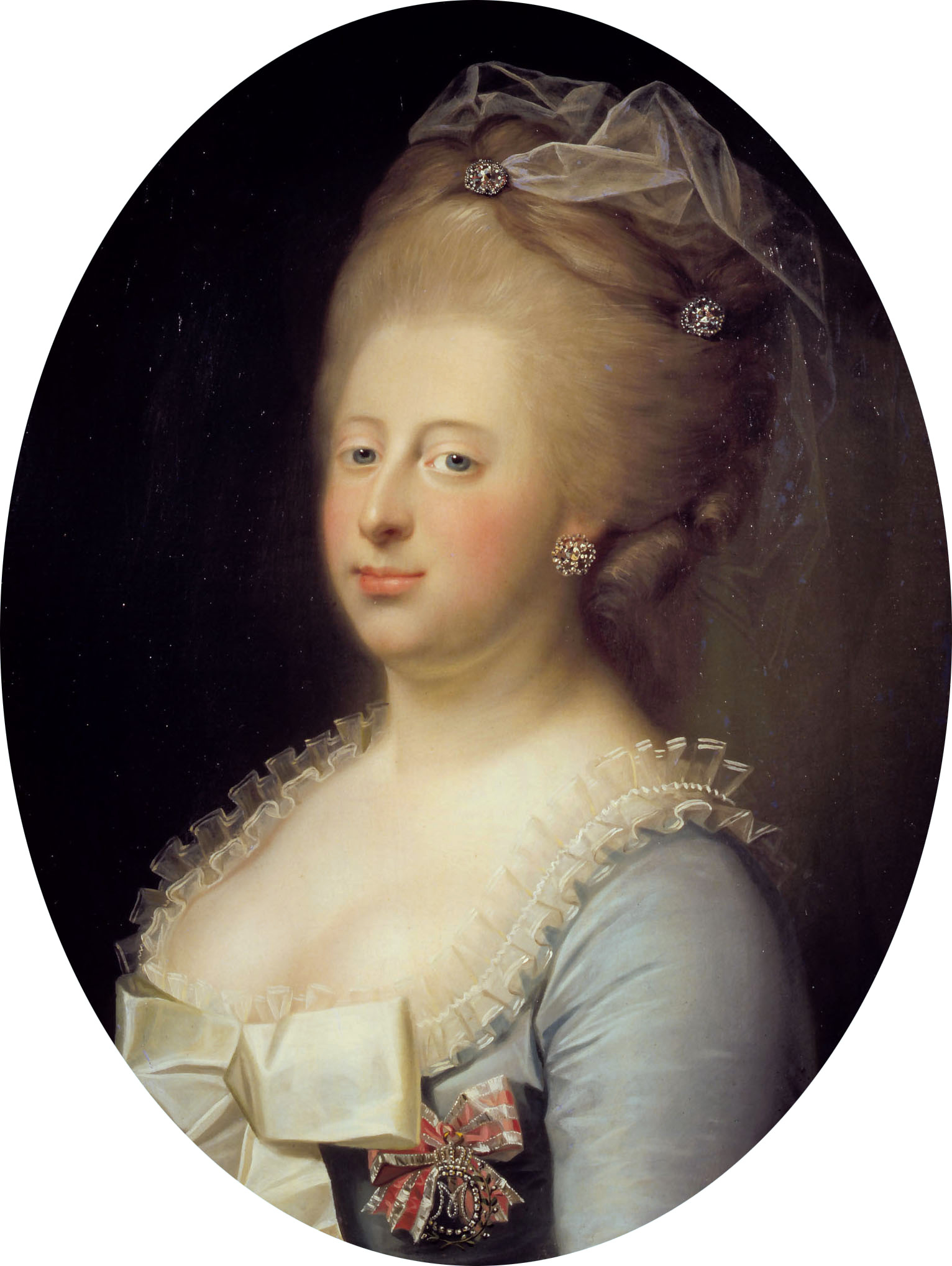
Caroline Matilde wearing the striped Order of Mathilde.

The Order of Mathilde (Mathildeordenen) was a Danish royal order, created by the queen of Denmark-Norway, Caroline Matilda of Great Britain, after whom it was named, on the birthday of the king, Christian VII of Denmark, 29 January 1771. It was no longer used after the banishment of its founder the year after.

The order was used to award members of the royal house, and a close circle around the royal couple and followers of the queen and her lover Johann Friedrich Struensee. Eleven of the twelve recipients were decorated on the birthday celebration of the monarch the same day the order was created. The exception was Louise von Plessen, who was awarded it in her absence, being in exile at Celle.

Recipients

1. Caroline Matilda of Great Britain
2. Christian VII of Denmark
3. Juliana Maria of Brunswick-Wolfenbüttel
4. Frederick, Hereditary Prince of Denmark
5. Johann Friedrich Struensee
6. Peter Elias von Gähler
7. Christine Sophie von Gähler
8. Schack Carl Rantzau-Ascheberg
9. Caroline Schimmelmann
10. Amalie Sophie Holstein
11. Enevold Brandt
12. Louise von Plessen
