= Louise von Plessen =

Danish lady-in-waiting and writer (1725–1799)

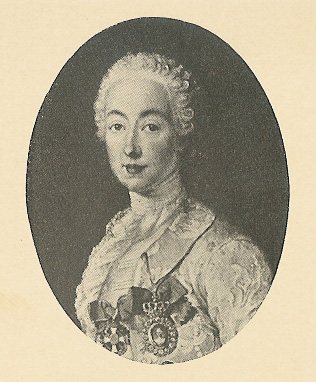
- Born: Countess Louise von Berckentin; 26 April 1725; Vienna
- Died: 14 September 1799 (aged 74); Celle
- Spouse: Christian Sigfred von Plessen
- Father: Count Christian August von Berckentin
- Mother: Susanna Margrethe von Boineburg zu Honstein
- Occupation: Lady-in-waiting

Louise Scheel von Plessen (née Countess Louise von Berckentin; Vienna, 26 April 1725 – Celle, 14 September 1799) was a Danish lady-in-waiting and memoir writer. She wrote the memoirs of her time at the Danish court: Mémoires de la cour de Danemark.

== Life ==
=== Early life ===
She was the daughter of Count Christian August von Berckentin (sometimes "Berkentin"; 1694–1758), the Danish ambassador to Austria, and his spouse, Susanna Margrethe von Boineburg zu Honstein (1697–1732). She spent her childhood in Vienna and with a maternal aunt at Vallø stift Protestant convent.

From 1740 to 1744, she was maid of honour to Christian VI's queen consort, Sophie Magdalene of Brandenburg-Kulmbach. In 1744 she married politician Major Christian Sigfred Scheel von Plessen (1716, Glorup Manor – 1755).

In the chronicles of Dorothea Biehl, a personal friend of a member of the court, Anna Sofie Bülow, Louise von Plessen was described as quite intelligent, having educated herself by reading, and with great charm when she felt motivated to make herself liked, but also as haughty and domineering: proud over her learning, and with the view that her sexual virtue made her morally superior, she reportedly felt entitled to be judgmental. Reportedly, she learned from queen Sophie Magdalene how to dominate a spouse, and did so during her own marriage, but in contrast to the royal marriage, her own was described as unhappy.

She became a childless widow in 1755, with a considerable fortune from her late spouse, which was enlarged by the inheritance from her father three years later. As a widow, she wished to live a peaceful life, and retired to the countryside with her friend baroness Amalie Charlotte Schack. In 1761 she made an unsuccessful attempt to start a charity school for poor girls in Christianshavn.

=== Court life ===
In August 1766, she somewhat reluctantly accepted the appointment of head lady-in-waiting or overhofmesterinde of the court of the new queen, Princess Caroline Matilda of Great Britain. Her task as senior lady in waiting was, according to her memoirs, to provide "a certain dignity and decency at court", a task she found to be very difficult. When the ladies-in-waiting to the queen were appointed, she made sure that all were Danes with the exception of Elisabet von Eyben.

Queen Caroline Matilda became attached to her as a mother-figure after she arrived in Denmark, and she became the queen's confidante. Already during the trip toward the capital after their first meeting, the queen became so attached to von Plessen, that she reportedly felt no need for any other courtier.

Initially, it had reportedly been the plan of Louise von Plessen to make queen Caroline Matilda as influential upon Christian VII, as queen Sophie Magdalene had been on Christian VI. To make this happen she had advised Caroline Matilda already when she was on her way to meet Christian that she should not be easily accessible to him, as this would make the king lose respect for her and treat her like a mistress: but instead she should keep her distance and make the king court her; an advice to which the queen had adjusted herself. Louise von Plessen had been displeased already when the king had traveled in the same carriage with the queen on their way from their first meeting. After the royal wedding, the king used to send a message to the queen's chambers to inquire if she was alone and ready to receive him; upon this, Louise von Plessen advised the queen to answer that the time was unsuitable, and even on occasions when the king did come, the queen played cards with Louise von Plessen until the king left again. The plan to make the king court the queen and become more eager when kept at a distance did not work, however; instead, it made the king more and more reluctant to visit the queen at all, and he complained about the distance of the queen and blamed Louise von Plessen for it. When an official cautioned her for meddling in the intimate affairs of the royal couple, Louise von Plessen refused to listen and referred to the immoral lifestyle of the king.

She was blamed for isolating the queen from the king because she disliked the king's friends, and because she wished to protect Caroline Matilda from what she believed to be a decadent environment where she could have been exposed to insult. Being described as a prude and proud over her strict morals, she resented the king's frivolous lifestyle and his favorites, especially Conrad Holck. According to the agents of the king, Louise von Plessen informed the queen of all of his immoral acts both before and during marriage, which is thought to have made Caroline Matilda to find him repulsive; she also informed her of the sexual indiscretions of the ladies of the court, which is thought to have isolated the queen socially; and she also pressed to have the king's favorite Holck removed.

Her position made her a central figure of the courtiers opposed to the king's circle, notably Ditlev Reventlow. Her private salon became a meeting place for cabinet ministers and courtiers in opposition to the king's favorites, who gathered there after the royal formal dinner twice a week to complain about the royal favorites. This circle were suspected of being opposed to the politics of Bernstroff and thereby of the Russian-Danish politics about Holstein-Gottorp, which was a big issue at the time. Louise von Plessen openly said to the king that she felt that Denmark showed too much tolerance toward Russia and the Russian envoy. The Russian negotiator, C. von Saldern, felt the treaty in danger, and pressed for the exile of Louise von Plessen, in which he was supported by her other enemies at court.

In March 1768, Louise von Plessen was suddenly informed that she was fired and exiled and was to leave within six hours without saying farewell to the queen, at that time sleeping, who was only informed about the exile after she had already left. Louise von Plessen attempted to see the queen anyway, but did not succeed.

Caroline Matilda was informed by a letter from the king given to her by Bernstorff, that he had dismissed Louise von Plessen because of the distance she created between them. Reportedly, the queen took her dismissal hard: she stated that she would have preferred to leave with von Plessen, swore to avenge her dismissal on everyone involved in it, and refused to accept her successor Anne Sofie von Berckentin, until she was offered Margrethe von der Lühe, a successor she found more acceptable.

=== Exile ===
Louise von Plessen was initially exiled to her estate Kokkedal, but then, as there was a fear of her influence, she was ordered to leave the country, and she settled in Celle, Germany, where she owned a property.

In Celle, she lived a luxurious life on the income from her fortune. She wrote the memoirs of her time at the Danish court, which was later published as Mémoires de la cour de Danemark.

During Christian VII's foreign travels in 1768–69, he visited Great Britain. During his visit, his mother-in-law princess Augusta, upon the initiative of Caroline Matilda, asked him publicly during a dinner to reinstate von Plessen in her position. He answered that he had made a sacred vow never to do so, but that if Caroline Matilda preferred von Plessen's company over him, so be it. In the end, Louise von Plessen was not reinstated, and Augusta apparently asked Caroline Matilda not to press the matter and to show more affection to Christian.

In 1771 Queen Caroline Matilda decorated Louise with her own Order of Mathilde (Mathildeordenen) in her absence. The following year, when the queen was divorced and exiled to Celle, Caroline Matilda and Louise von Plessen reunited and resumed their friendship. Caroline Matilda died in 1775. Louise von Plessen resided in Celle until her death.
