= Christian August von Eyben =

German lawyer (1700–1785)

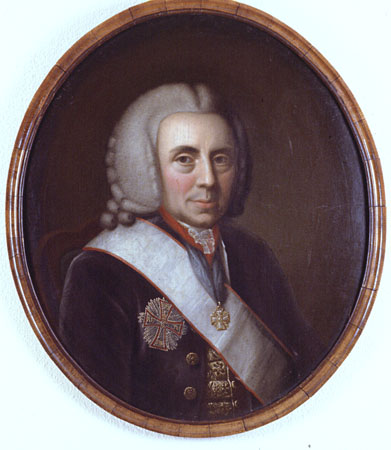
Contemporary portrait of Christian August von Eyben

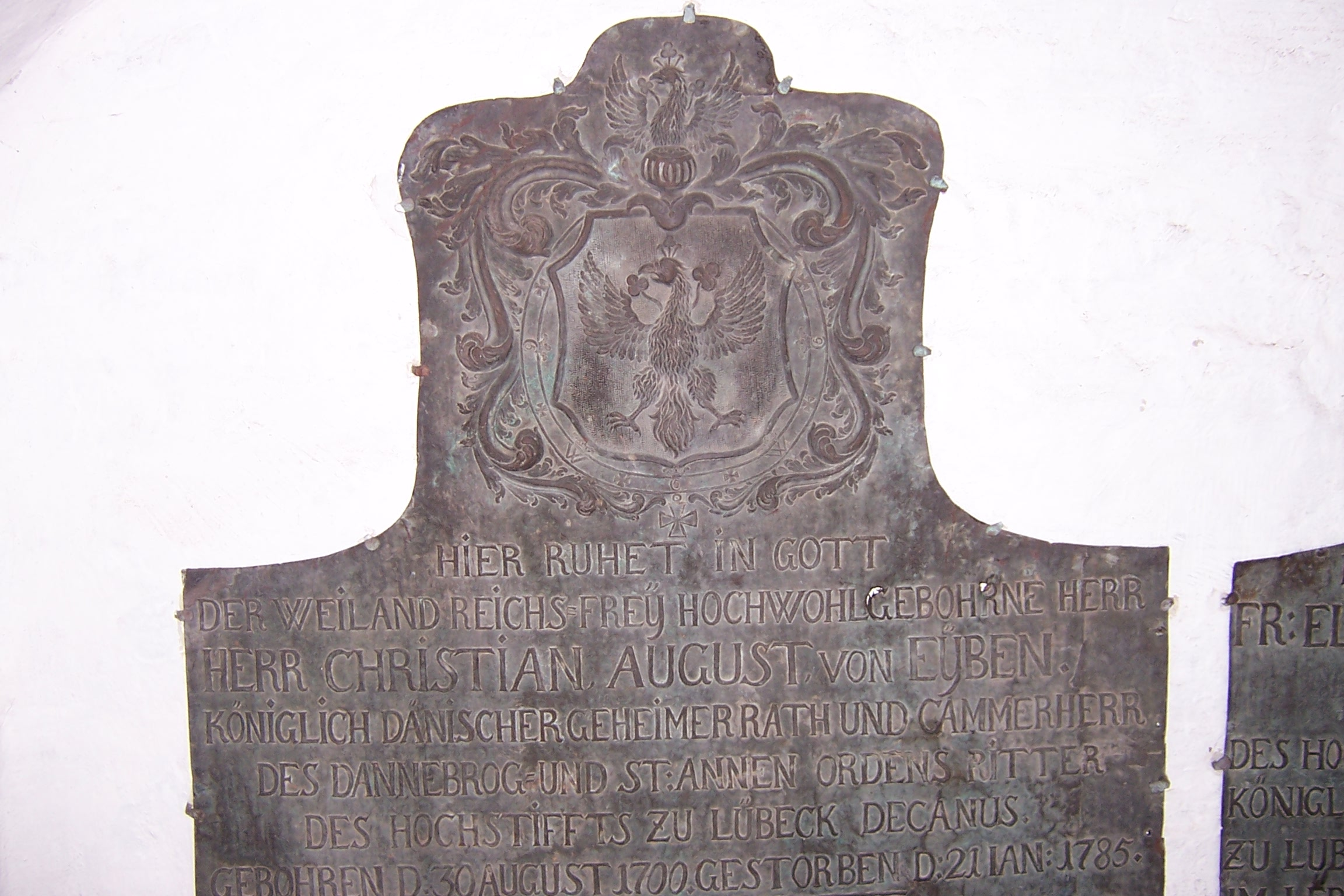
The von Eybens' gravestone in Lübeck Cathedral

Christian August von Eyben (30 August 1700, Schleswig - 21 January 1785, Lübeck) was a German lawyer and dean of the Bishopric of Lübeck.

== Life ==
From a family of lawyers and diplomats, Christian was the son of the diplomat Christian Wilhelm von Eyben and uncle to Hulderich von Eyben and Weipart Ludwig von Fabrice. After a grand tour with his elder brother Friedrich, in 1723 he entered the service of the prince-bishop of Lübeck Christian August as a squire - the bishop was Laos his godfather. He was an assessor in the Justizkanzlei, the Rentkammer and the Consistory and rose to be chief steward to Christian August's wife Albertine Friederike von Baden-Durlach - his father had entered public life in the service of Albertine's father Frederick VII, Margrave of Baden-Durlach. In 1729 Christian became a canon of Lübeck Cathedral and in 1763 its dean.

== Marriage and issue ==
In Braunschweig Cathedral in 1735 he married Elisabeth Sophia Maria von Hassberge (1717–1782). They had eight children:

1. Elisabet von Eyben (1736–1780), from 1766 first lady of the bedchamber to queen Caroline Matilda
2. Friedrich Ludwig von Eyben (1738–1793), Danish ambassador to Naples and Regensburg
3. Christian Wilhelm von Eyben (1741–1774)
4. Adolf Gottlieb von Eyben (1741–1811), adopted by Friedrich von Eyben, chancellor in Glückstadt
5. Albertine Friederike von Eyben (1743–1809)
6. Joachim Werner von Eyben (1746–1811), officer, later colonel in Oldenburg
7. Charlotte Christiane Augusta von Eyben (1748–1830), entered the Kloster Lüne
8. August Wilhelm Gottlob von Eyben (1751–nach 1804), Russian state councillor

Christian August and his wife were buried in a north-west ambulatory chapel in Lübeck Cathedral.

== Honours ==
- 1742 Order of St Anne
- 1756 Order of the Dannebrog

== Bibliography ==
- Johann Friedrich Jugler: Beyträge zur juristischen Biographie... Leipzig: Heinsius 1773, S. 209-214 (, p. 211, at Google Books)
