= Ida Hedevig Moltke =

Danish countess and letter writer (1744–1816)

Ida Hedevig von Moltke née von Buchwaldt (1744–1816) was a Danish countess of German origin and a letter writer.

== Life ==
She was born to German nobleman Frederik von Buchwald and Henriette Emilie von Holstein and became the cousin of Amalie Sofie von Holstein and sister-in-law of Count Johann Hartwig Ernst von Bernstorff. In 1760, she married the courtier Count Christian Frederik von Moltke (1736–1771).

The court office of her first spouse made her a participator in Danish court life, where she became known for her love life. While her spouse was the lover of Elisabet von Eyben, she had an affair with the Spanish envoy Sebastian de Llano y la Quadra. Although her spouse was on the queen's side against the king's favorite Conrad Holck, he lost his office in 1771 and the couple had to leave court.

When Moltke died shortly afterward, a scandal erupted following that his window had caused his death. Speculation suggested she had either infected him with a venereal disease, driven him to suicide out of grief over adultery or poisoned him with the help of her lover, the courtier Karl Adolf von Plessen. Her marriage to von Plessen in 1771, soon after becoming a widow, fueled further suspicion, though neither was ever formally charged.

Karl Adolf von Plessen belonged to the circle of Schack Carl Rantzau–Ascheberg, who planned to make an alliance with Sweden against Russia, during which her spouse was to be sent as an agent to Sweden and Enevold Brandt to France. These plans were never realized.

Her preserved correspondence is generally regarded as a valuable historic source about the courtiers of the Danish royal court of her time.

== See also ==
- Luise Gramm

== Sources ==
- August Fjelstrup: Damerne ved Karoline Mathildes Hof, 1909.
