= Johanne Marie Malleville =

Danish courtier (1750–1817)

Johanne Marie de Malleville (1750-1817), was a favorite of queen Caroline Matilda of Denmark.

== Life ==
She was born to captain Emanuel Meyer and Johanne Mohlholm, and married captain Thomas de Malleville in 1763. After the queen had entered into a love affair with Struensee in 1770, a reform was introduced to allow non-nobles invitations to the royal table, were etiquette was relaxed, and members of the rich burgher class were commonly invited to dine with the royal family. Officially introduced as a reform through which the monarch was given opportunity to meet his subjects, the real reason was thought to be a wish to Struensee to introduce the queen to people outside of the nobility, among whom she could meet friends likely to be more favorable to his reforms.

Johanne Marie Malleville belongs to those non-noble women invited who actually did become a personal friend and favorite of the queen. After having been introduced at one such informal dinner, Malleville was from that time forward often seen in the company of the queen at the card table and other events at court. In conservative circles, the presence of Malleville at court and among the friends of the queen was seen as shocking. The queen was already regarded to be exposed to bad influence from her circle of friends of Elisabet von Eyben, Anna Sofie von Bülow, Christine Sophie von Gähler and Amalie Sofie von Holstein, and the fact that the queen was allowed to mix with women not belonging to the nobility was seen as further scandalous, in particular as Malleville behaved at court as a noblewoman, losing considerable amounts of money at the card table and taking the lover of Anna Sofie Bülow, the courtier and noble Frederik Karl von Warnstedt, as a lover.

At the fall of Struensee in January 1772, her spouse, in his capacity of a member of the military, actually belonged to those arresting Struensee. For this, he was awarded with a post in the colony of Saint Thomas in the Caribbean. Johanne Marie Malleville did not follow him there but remained in Copenhagen. In 1780, she divorced her spouse because of infidelity on his part and the following year she married count Verner Schulenburg.
