= Hedevig =

Hedevig may refer to:

- Hedevig Johanne Bagger (1740-1822), Danish inn-keeper and postmaster
- Hedevig Lund (1824–1888), Norwegian painter
- Ida Hedevig Moltke (1744–1816), Danish countess and letter writer
- Hedevig Rasmussen (1902–1985), Danish freestyle swimmer who competed in the 1924 Summer Olympics
- Hedevig Rosing (1827–1913), author, educator, school founder; first woman to teach in Copenhagen's public schools
- Hedevig Ulfeldt, (1626–1678), daughter of king Christian IV of Denmark and Kirsten Munk
