= Anna Sofie Bülow =

Danish aristocrat (1745–1787)

- Known for: one of the Three Graces of the Danish royal court
- Born: 1745
- Died: 1787
- Spouse(s): Baron Frederik Ludvig Ernst von Bülow

Anna Sofie von Bülow (1745–1787), was a Danish noble and courtier, known for her love life and unconventional life style, known in history as one of the Three Graces of the Danish royal court.

== Life ==
She was the daughter of Christian Conrad of Danneskiold-Laurvig and his wife, Dorte Sofie von Holstein and married the courtier, Baron Frederik Ludvig Ernst von Bülow in 1763.

Together with the Baroness Amalie Sofie von Holstein and Countess Christine Sophie von Gähler, she became known as one of the Three Graces of the Danish royal court. She attracted attention with her beauty and love life: at this point, women at the Danish court could have official lovers, called amants déclarés, and hers were in succession minister Konrad Aleksander Fabritius, the royal equerry Frederik Karl von Warnstedt, who left her for Johanne Marie Malleville, and finally courtier Hans Heinrich Friccius von Schilden-Huitfeldt. Luise Gramm claimed that she scandalously met von Warnstedt in 1770, a room close by another in which the body of the queen dowager was lying in state.

She accompanied the royal couple on their tour of the Duchies in 1770. During this trip, the king's former favorite Enevold Brandt was recalled to court, and the king's then favorite Conrad Holck was sent back to Copenhagen. Holck asked his brother, who asked her father, who asked her to speak to the queen on Holck's behalf, but if she did, this did not stop his fall, as he lost his position as royal favorite and was exiled.

In the summer of 1771, Anna Sofie Bülow discovered an open letter addressed to a lady on the stairs of Frederiksberg Palace. The letter described a plot to arrest Queen Caroline Matilda and Struensee, planned to occur at the public party which was to be arranged there 28 September, where the conspirators were to step forward and publicly declare that they acted on loyalty to the king. She sent the letter to the royal court at Hirschholm Palace. The result was that the public party was cancelled with reference to the king's health, and that the court remained at Hirschholm with a stronger guard than before.

The Bülow couple was exiled to their estate in Holstein after the fall of Struensee in January 1772. In 1774–1775, they met Nathaniel William Wraxall, who planned to install Queen Caroline Matilda as regent of Denmark.
