= Margrethe von der Lühe =

Danish noble (1741–1826)

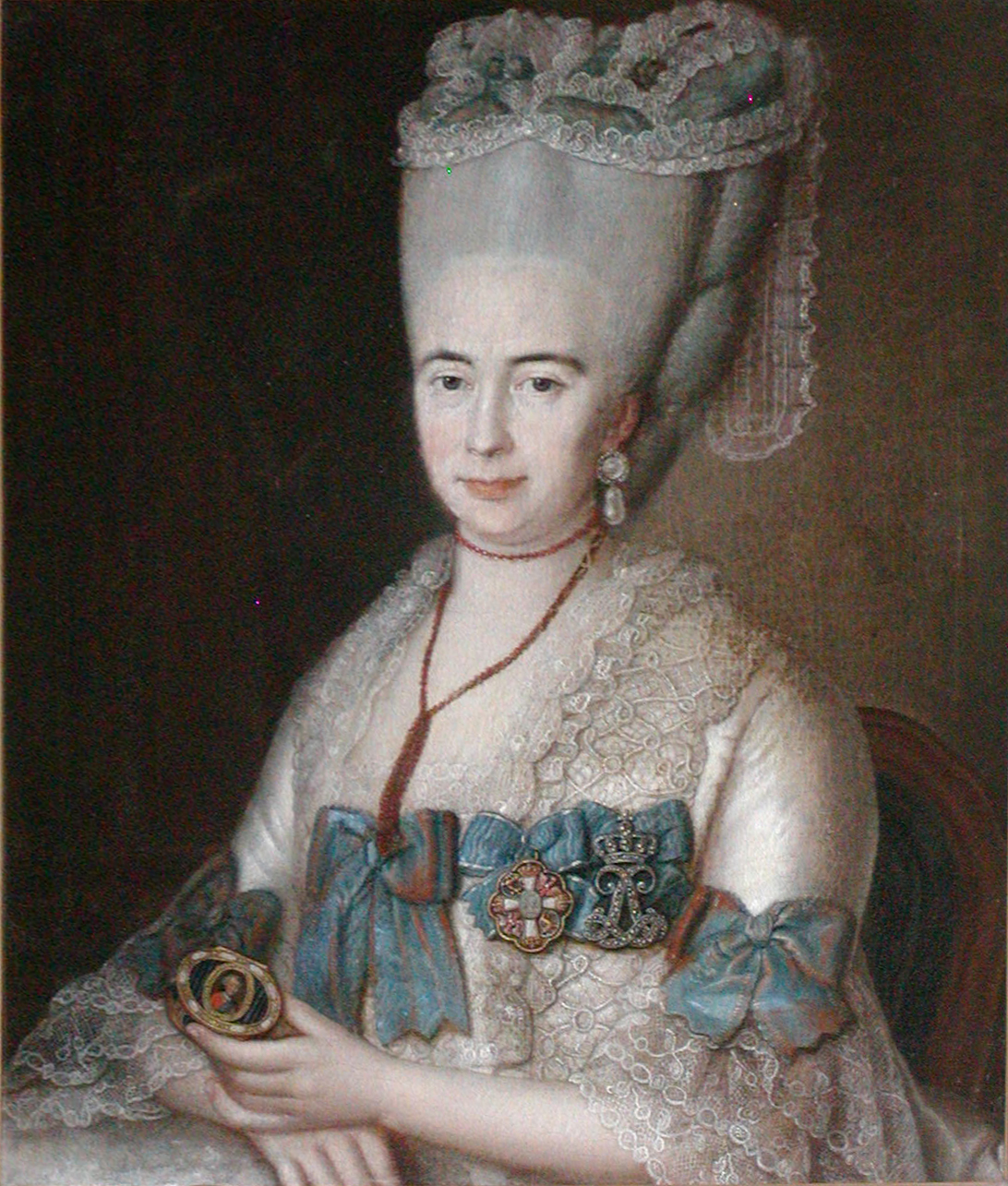
- Portrait of Margrethe Holck, Ulrich Ferdinandt Beenfeldt, 1777
- Born: Margrethe Holck; February 16, 1741; Orebygaard, Denmark
- Died: October 1, 1826 (aged 85); Copenhagen, Denmark
- Spouse(s): Volrad August von der Lühe (1767–d. 1778); Christian Numsen (1784–d. 1811)
- Relatives: Conrad Holck (brother); Gustav Frederik Holck-Winterfeldt (brother)
- Honours: Ordre de l'Union Parfaite (1768)

Margrethe von der Lühe (16 February 1741– 1 October 1826) was a Danish courtier. She was a lady-in-waiting to Princess Louise of Denmark from 1766–1768, Chief Court Mistress to the Queen Caroline Matilda of Great Britain from 1768–1770, and Chief Court Mistress to Queen dowager Juliana Maria of Brunswick-Wolfenbüttel from 1772–1784.

She was born into the Holck and Winterfeld Danish noble families. She was married to Volrad August von der Lühe from 1767 until his death. She remarried in 1784 to Christian Frederik Numsen, after which she left court.

== Life at court ==
Margrethe von der Lühe was born on 16 February 1741 at Orebygaard. She was the daughter of count Christian Christopher Holck (1698–1774) and Ermegaard Sophie von Winterfeldt (1702–1756) and was one of eleven children, 7 of whom survived to adulthood. Her brother Gustav Frederik Holck-Winterfeldt was a county governor and her brother Conrad Holck was a favorite of king Christian VII of Denmark.

In 1750, she entered the convent in Roskilde. From 1766 to 1768, she acted as lady-in-waiting to Princess Louise of Denmark. While a member of the princess' court, she married Volrad August von der Lühe on 6 May 1767 in Copenhagen.

In 1768, her brother Conrad Holck used his influence in the Court of Christian VII to remove Louise von Plessen who had been Chief Court Mistress to Queen Caroline Matilda. Despite being a favorite of the king's, the queen greatly disliked Conrad, and was angered that von Plessen had been dismissed without her consent. The position of Chief Court Mistress was briefly taken over by Anne Sofie von Berckentin, but the queen did not accept her. Although the queen despised her brother, she showed favor towards Margrethe; they had taken frequent walks together in the countryside previously, and Caroline Matilda reportedly liked her humor. Through her brother's intervention and the queens good favor, Margrethe thus became the Chief Court Mistress in 1768. That same year, she was awarded the Ordre de l'Union Parfaite. In 1770, she was replaced in her post by Charlotte Elisabeth Henriette Holstein.

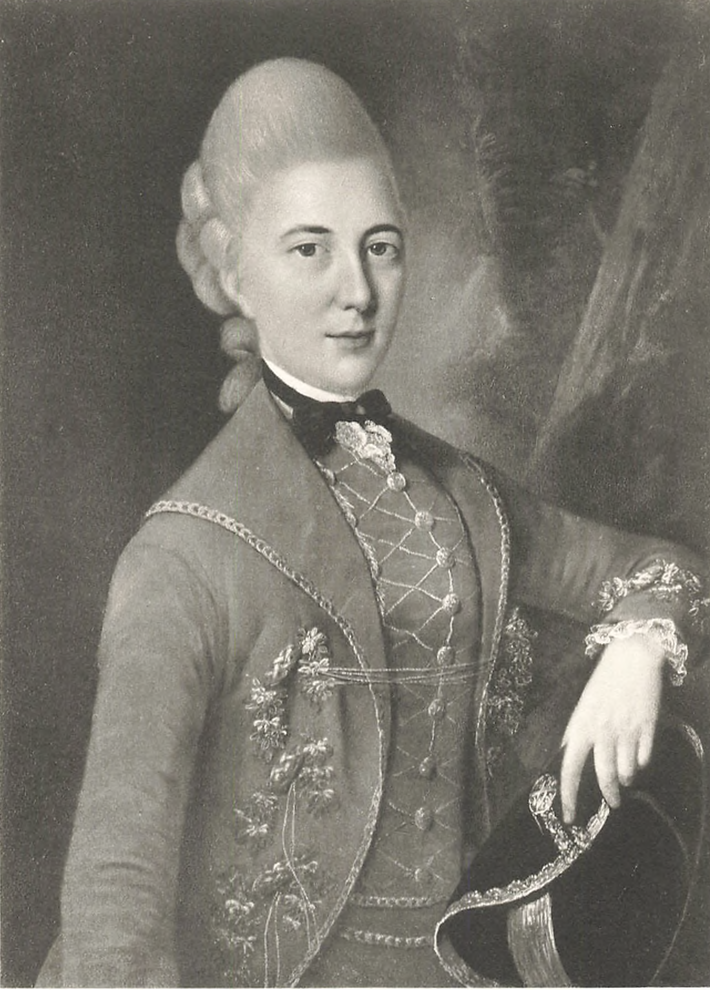
Margrethe von der Lühe painted by Erik Pauelsen.

In 1774, she was given the post of Chief Court Mistress to the queen dowager Juliana Maria, who was the de facto regent at the time. She was one of the influential figures of the regency regime of Juliane Marie alongside kammarfrue Sophie Hedevig Jacobi, Juliane Marie's secretary Johan Theodor Holmskjold, and crown prince Frederick's tutor, Professor Sporon. She was described as ambitious and reportedly used her influence for petitioners whose cause resulted in disagreement between the royal court and the council. Niels Ditlev Riegels was reportedly one of her protégés and he may have had her to thank for acquiring a position at court in 1781. Riegels participated in the 1784 coup that deposed Juliana Maria from power, and he dedicated a publication to Margrethe von der Lühe.

On 24 July 1784, she remarried Lieutenant General, Gehejmeråd Christian Frederik Numsen (1741–1811) and left court. Margrethe von de Lühe died on 1 October 1826 in Copenhagen.
