= Christine Sophie von Gähler =

Danish noble and courtier (1745–1792)

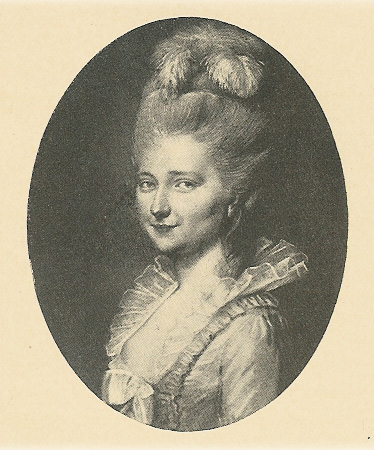
- Born: 1745
- Died: 18 July 1792 (aged 46–47)
- Other name: Countess von der Goltz
- Occupations: Noblewoman and courtier
- Spouse: Peter Elias von Gähler
- Parents: Henrik von Ahlefeldt (father); Frederikke Marsilia Krag (mother)

Christine Sophie von Gähler, Countess von der Goltz, née von Ahlefeldt (1745 – 18 July 1792) was a Danish noble and courtier, known for her love life and unconventional life style, known in history as one of the Three Graces of the Danish royal court.

== Life ==
She was born to a nobleman, Colonel Henrik von Ahlefeldt (1711–1765) and Frederikke Marsilia Krag (1724–1756). In 1762, she married the officer nobleman Peter Elias von Gähler. Her spouse had no title other than that of General, and she was thereby known by the female form of this title, Generalinde ('literary: Generaless'). From 1767 onward, her spouse made a successful career as court official, and she was from that point an active participator in court life.

=== Court life ===
Christine Sophie von Gähler was a leading profile of the royal court of King Christian VII of Denmark, where she attracted attention with her beauty, her vivaciousness, sarcastic wit and humorous temper. Together with the Baroness Anna Sofie von Bülow and Countess Amalie Sofie von Holstein, she became known as one of the Three Graces of the Danish royal court. She was a leading figure of the court and well regarded by both the King as well as the Queen: she was regarded as socially indispensable at the card games played by the king and his favorites Count Enevold Brandt and Count Christian Frederik von Holstein, as well as by queen Caroline Matilda of Great Britain, when she enjoyed outings with her ladies-in-waiting during her summers in the countryside, during which they were escorted by their admirers while their husbands were left at home. She became known for her lovers, whether there was truth in these rumors or not, though she always referred to her spouse in public. Contemporary chronicles claim that she had an affair with Claude Louis, Comte de Saint-Germain because she needed his financial assistance to both her spouse and her true lover, and the letter writer Luise Gramm claim that her good relation to Struensee once made the queen jealous. As a person, she comes across in her correspondence as a free-minded and tolerant person who disliked gossip and plots who had the ability to be civil and see the good also in people she disliked.

She is described as the female courtier perhaps most favored by the queen and almost always in her company at card games, masked balls and outings, a friendship that was established at least from 1767 onward. In 1770, she accompanied the king and queen upon their tour through the Duchies, during which she corresponded with her spouse. At that trip, she accompanied the queen in the informal dinners and outings she enjoyed with Struensee and their closest friends. In 1771, she was given the order of the queen because of their close friendship. She was also present with the queen at Hirschholm Palace during the summer of 1771.

Christine Sophie von Gähler was decorated with the Ordenen de l'Union Parfaite (1765) and the Order of Mathilde, Mathildeordenen (1771).

=== Fall of Struensee ===
In connection to the fall of the queen's lover Struensee, Christine Sophie von Gähler and her spouse were both arrested and imprisoned on the night of 16–17 January 1772, after which their home was searched. At her arrest, she showed no fear but calmly commented that she was glad to accompany her spouse in prison. Her son commented, that he was not worried about his father, as he had surely been very careful, but that he was very worried about his mother. The reason for her arrest was that her close relationship with the queen, the good contact she had with Struensee, and the favors she had enjoyed because of it, made her and her spouse suspected to be involved in the queen's crime, and she was also suspected of having been given political documents for safe keeping; her spouse was arrested because of his political career under Struensee. However, nothing incriminating was found. During interrogation, she claimed never to have been involved in state affairs, and that she had also advised her spouse to defer from it, but that they had needed his salary from his career under Struensee.

=== Later life ===
She was freed and released in May of that year, officially cleared, though she was warned that she was worthy of a punishment for her "foolish and unwise behavior". Her spouse was, however, deprived of all his offices and the couple were expelled and also banned from residing in any of their estates. They were therefore forced to leave Denmark, and settled in Itzehoe in Germany. One of her admirers, general major J. F. Classen, aided them economically by granting them a yearly income. She became a widow in 1783. In 1792, she married German General, Count Karl Alexander von der Goltz, but died during her wedding night.
