= Caroline Matilda of Great Britain =

Queen of Denmark and Norway from 1766 to 1772

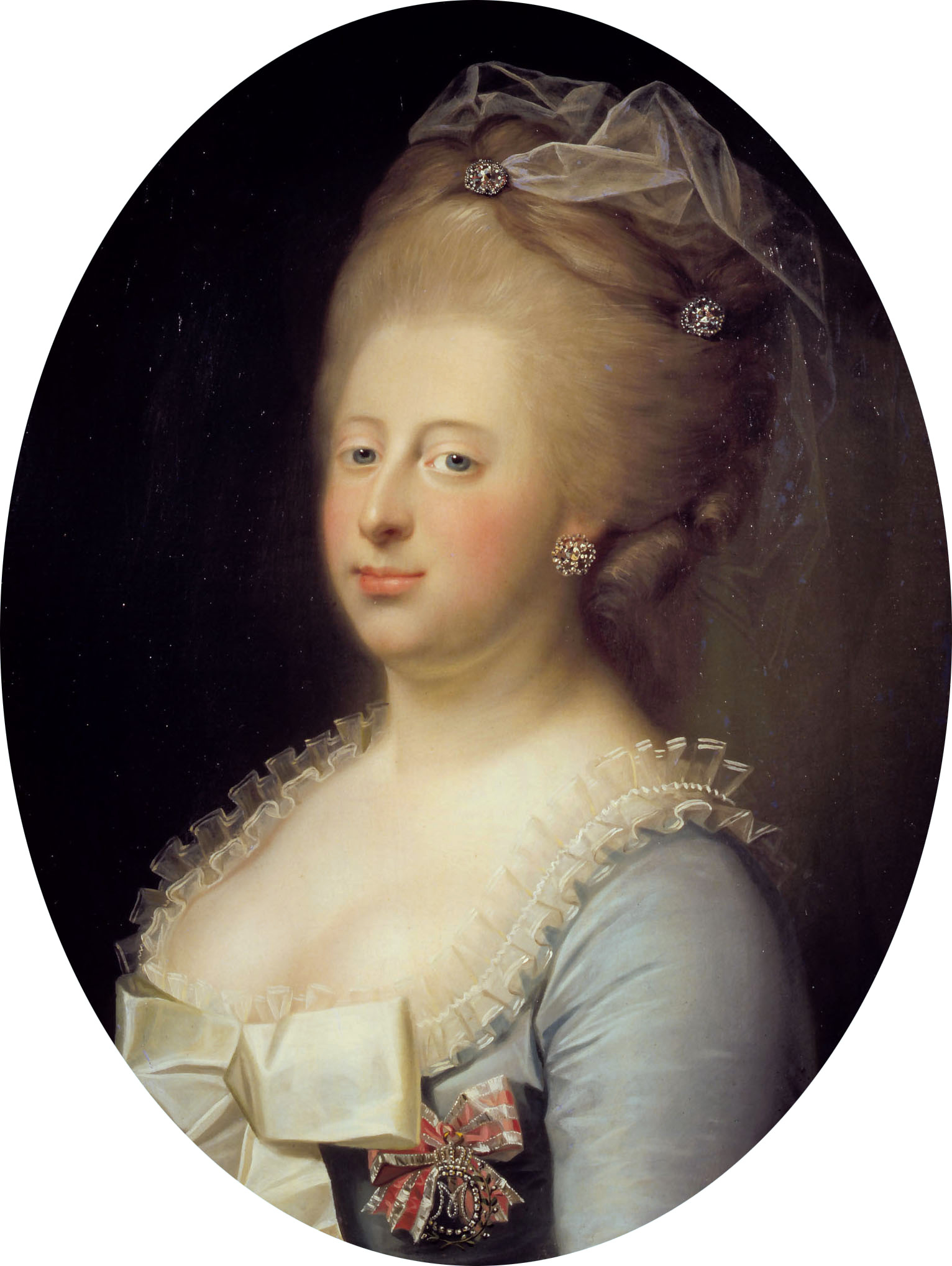
- Portrait by Jens Juel, 1771

Queen consort of Denmark and Norway
- Tenure: 8 November 1766 – April 1772
- Coronation: 1 May 1767
- Born: 22 July 1751 (New Style) (Note: At the start of Caroline Matilda's life, Great Britain still used the Old Style Julian calendar. Denmark-Norway had adopted the New Style Gregorian calendar in 1700, whereas Great Britain would adopt it in 1752.); Leicester House, London, England, Great Britain
- Died: 10 May 1775 (aged 23); Celle, Holy Roman Empire
- Burial: 13 May 1775; Stadtkirche St. Marien, Celle
- Spouse: Christian VII of Denmark (m. 1766; div. 1772)
- Issue: Frederick VI of Denmark; Louise Augusta, Duchess of Schleswig-Holstein-Sonderburg-Augustenburg
- House: Hanover
- Father: Frederick, Prince of Wales
- Mother: Augusta of Saxe-Gotha-Altenburg

Caroline Matilda of Great Britain (Danish: Caroline Mathilde; 22 July [O.S. 11 July] 1751 – 10 May 1775) was Queen of Denmark and Norway from 1766 to 1772 by marriage to King Christian VII.

The youngest and posthumous daughter of Frederick, Prince of Wales and Princess Augusta of Saxe-Gotha, Caroline Matilda was raised in a secluded family atmosphere away from the royal court. At the age of 15, she was married to her first cousin, King Christian VII of Denmark and Norway, who suffered from a mental illness and was cold to his wife throughout the marriage. She had two children: the future Frederick VI and Louise Augusta; the latter's biological father may have been the German physician Johann Friedrich Struensee.

In 1769, Struensee entered the service of the Danish king; initially Caroline Matilda treated him coldly, but he quickly won the Queen's heart and they began a love affair. Struensee gained more and more power and instituted a series of reforms that Caroline Matilda supported. Struensee's reforms and his relationship with the Queen generated powerful enemies, who included Christian VII's stepmother Queen Dowager Juliana Maria and her son Prince Frederick. In 1772, Juliana Maria directed a plot to remove Struensee and the Queen from power. Struensee was executed and Caroline Matilda was divorced and banished to Celle, Electorate of Hanover, where she died at the age of 23 from scarlet fever in 1775.

== Life ==
=== Birth and early years ===
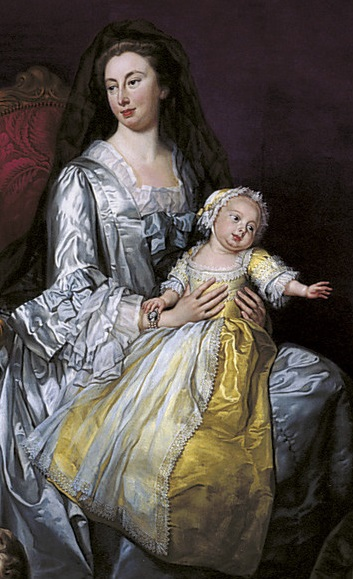
Caroline Matilda in her mother's arms, detail from George Knapton's 1751 group portrait The Children of Frederick, Prince of Wales

Caroline Matilda was born on 22 July [O.S. 11 July] 1751 as the ninth and youngest child of Frederick, Prince of Wales, and Princess Augusta of Saxe-Gotha. Her father had died suddenly about three months before her birth, on 31 March 1751, and she was thus a posthumous child. She was born at Leicester House, London, a large aristocratic townhouse in Westminster, where her parents had lived, since the King had banished his son from court in 1737. The Princess was christened ten days after being born, on 1 August, at the same house, by the Bishop of Norwich, Thomas Hayter. Her godparents were her brother George, her aunt Caroline, and her sister Augusta.

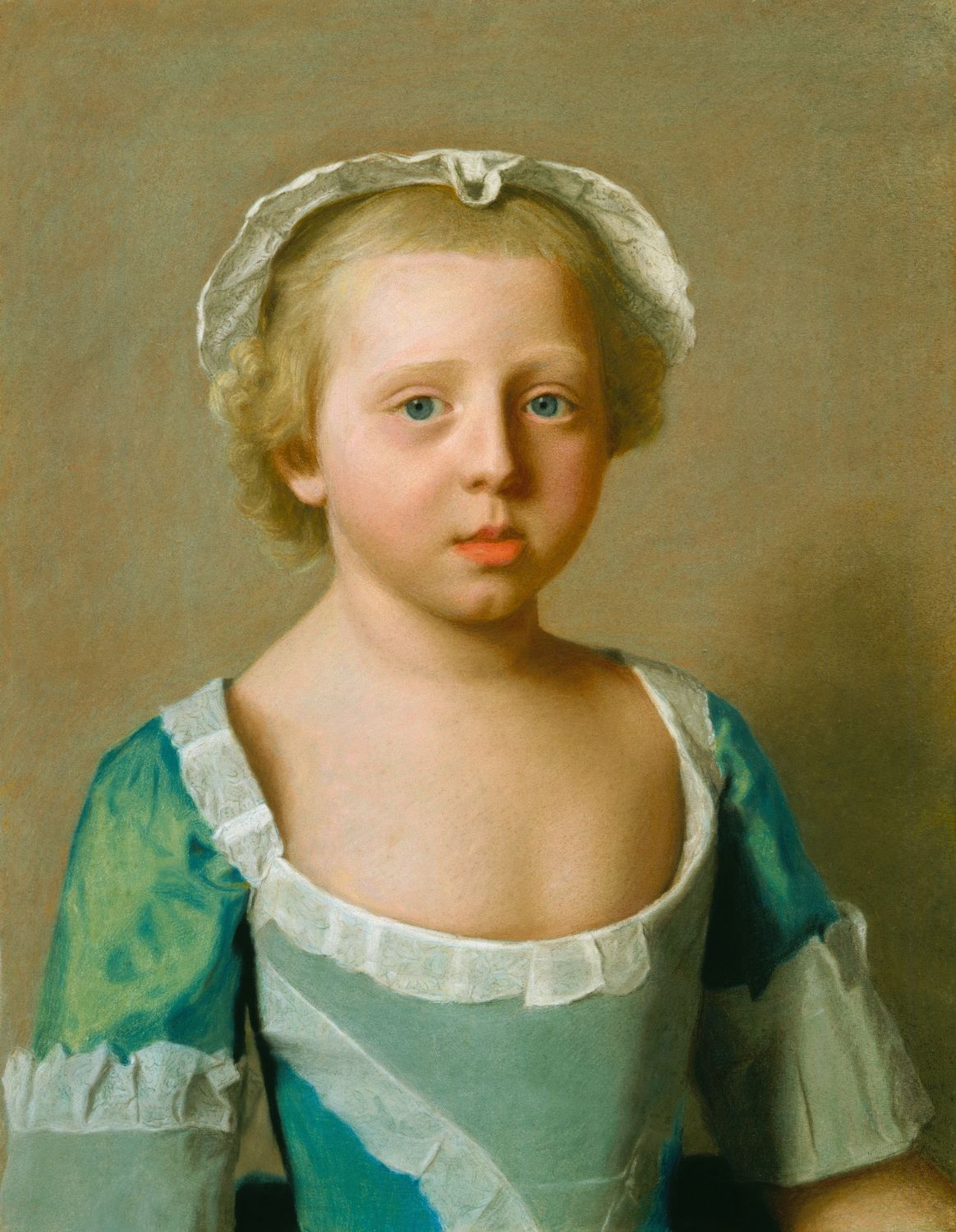
Caroline Matilda, aged 3. Pastel by Jean-Étienne Liotard, 1754 (the Royal Collection).

Caroline Matilda grew up in the large group of siblings, and during the remaining years of the reign of George II, Augusta chose to live in seclusion with her children, devoting herself to their care, and bringing them up away from the English court and the depravities of court life. As a consequence, Augusta was to be criticised for her manner of raising her children, as she isolated them from the outside world into a secluded family environment, seldom meeting people outside the family. Caroline Matilda spent most of the time with her family in Leicester House, but during holidays they moved to Kew Palace. She was described as temperamental, but natural and informal, and for this reason, she was uninterested in politics and court intrigues as an adult. She enjoyed outdoor life and riding, and, despite the irregularities of her and her sisters' education, she was described as intelligent. She was musically gifted, played the harpsichord and was an accomplished singer with a beautiful voice. She enjoyed reading and could speak three languages besides English: Italian, French, and German.

=== Marriage ===
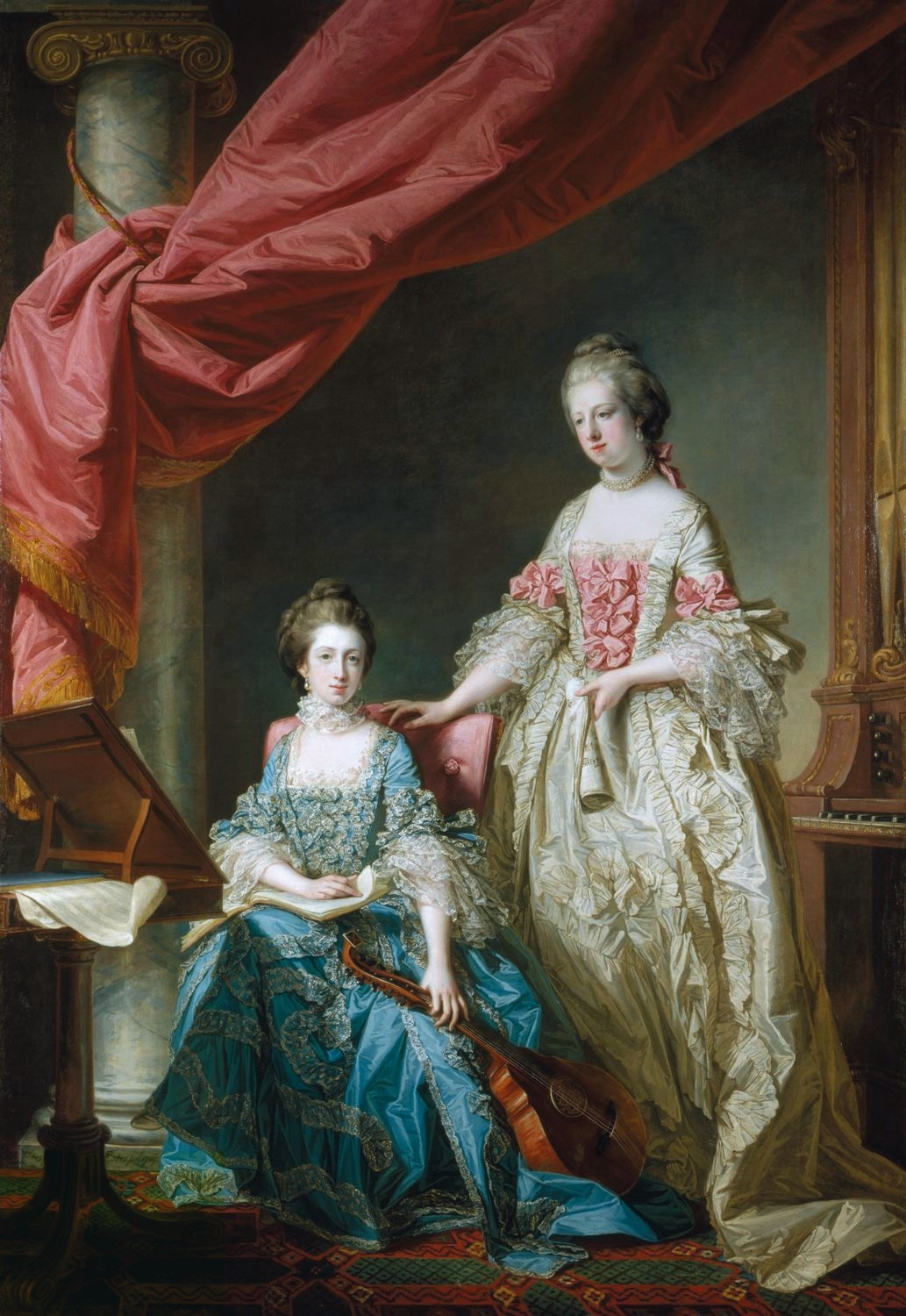
The 16-year-old Queen stands next to her sister, Princess Louisa of Great Britain, by Francis Cotes

In 1764, a marriage was suggested between the Danish House of Oldenburg and the British House of Hanover, specifically between Christian, Crown Prince of Denmark, and a British princess. The Danish Crown Prince was the oldest surviving son of King Frederick V and his first wife Princess Louise of Great Britain, and in consequence, first cousin of the children of the late Prince of Wales. The marriage was considered suitable because the British and Danish royal families were both Protestant and of the same rank, and thus had the same status as well as religion. Additionally, the deceased Queen Louise had been very popular in Denmark. Initially, the marriage negotiations were intended for the eldest unmarried daughter of the former Prince of Wales, Princess Louisa Anne, but after the Danish representative in London, Count von Bothmer, was informed of her weak constitution, her younger sister Caroline Matilda was chosen for the match instead. At the age of 13, Caroline Mathilde was therefore, without her knowledge, engaged to Crown Prince Christian, who was two years her senior. The official betrothal was announced on 10 January 1765.

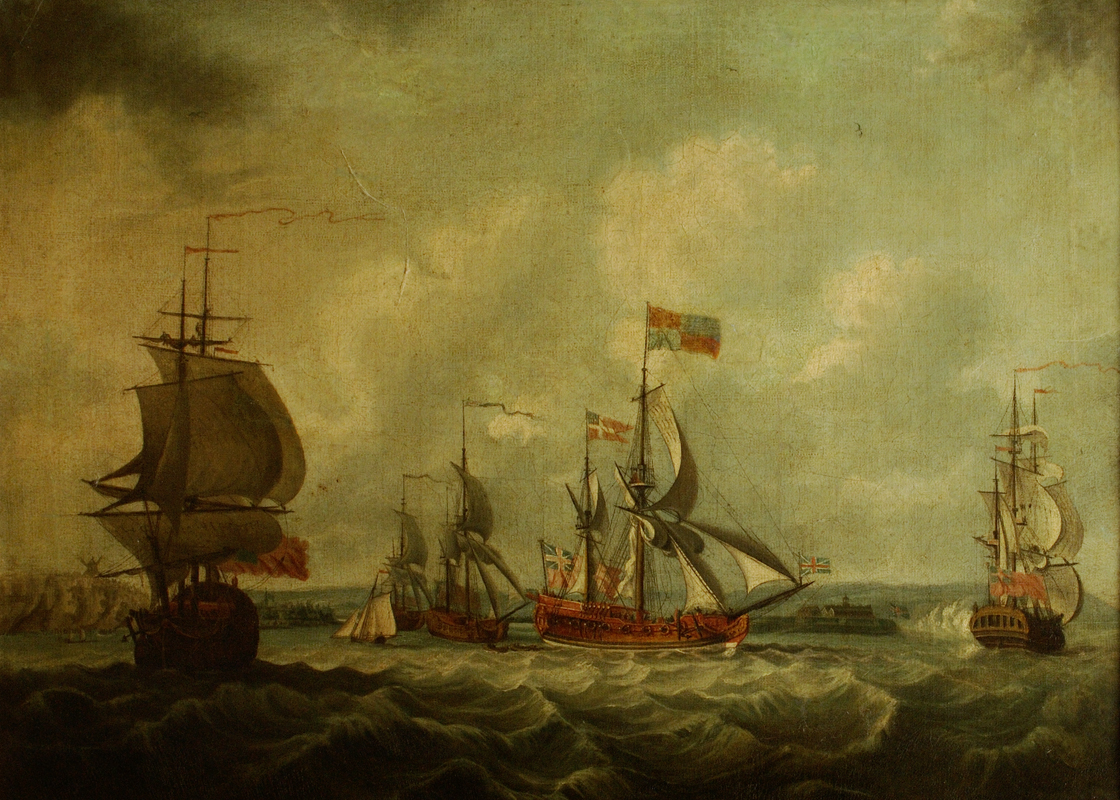
The departure of Caroline Matilda from Harwich for Rotterdam on board the yacht Mary on 3 October 1766. Landguard Fort on the left of the picture. Oil painting by Robert Wilkins, c. 1766–1767.

On 14 January 1766, in the middle of preparations for the wedding, King Frederick V died and his 17-year-old son became King Christian VII. On 1 October of that year in the Chapel Royal of St James's Palace (or according to other sources, in Carlton House) the marriage was celebrated by proxy, the groom being represented by the bride's brother Prince Edward, Duke of York and Albany. Two days later, Caroline Matilda departed from Harwich for Rotterdam, and three weeks later she crossed the river Elbe and arrived in Altona, in the then Danish Duchy of Holstein. There she left her British entourage and was welcomed by her appointed Danish courtiers. Twelve days later, Caroline Matilda arrived in Roskilde, where she met her future husband for the first time. She held her official entry into the Danish capital on 8 November to great cheers from the population. Later the same day a second wedding ceremony with the groom present took place in the Royal Chapel at Christiansborg Palace in Copenhagen. Marriage celebrations and balls lasted for another month. On 1 May 1767, Christian VII and Caroline Matilda were crowned King and Queen of Denmark and Norway in the chapel of Christiansborg Palace.

=== Queen of Denmark and Norway ===
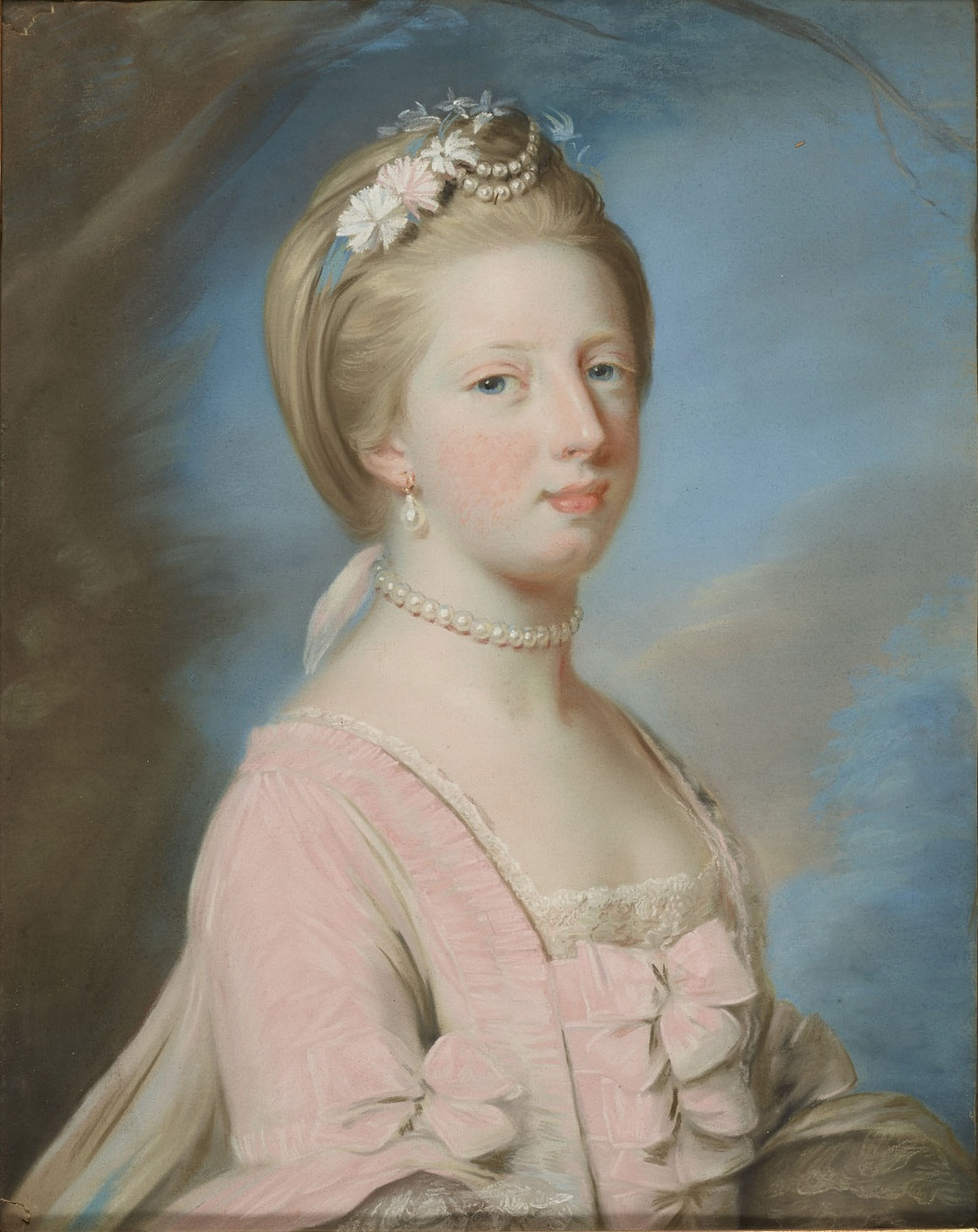
Portrait by Catherine Read, 1767

The young Queen at the Danish court was described as particularly temperamental, vivid and charming. She was thought too plump to be described as a beauty, but she was considered attractive: it was said of her that "her appearance allowed her to avoid criticism of women, but still captivate the male eye." However, her natural and unaffected personality was not popular at the strict Danish court, despite the fact that originally she was warmly received in Copenhagen. The weak-willed, self-centred, and mentally ill (Note: Modern doctors believe that Christian VII suffered from schizophrenia.) Christian VII was cold to his wife and not in a hurry to consummate the marriage. The reason for this attitude towards his wife could be that the King was actually forced to marry by the court, who believed that marriage would lead to improvement in his mental problems; in addition, part of the court felt that Christian VII preferred the company of men to women. Despite rumours of homosexuality, the King had a mistress with whom he began a relationship in Holstein in the summer of 1766, and often visited courtesans in Copenhagen, of which the most famous was Anna Katrina Bentgagen, nicknamed Støvlet-Cathrine.

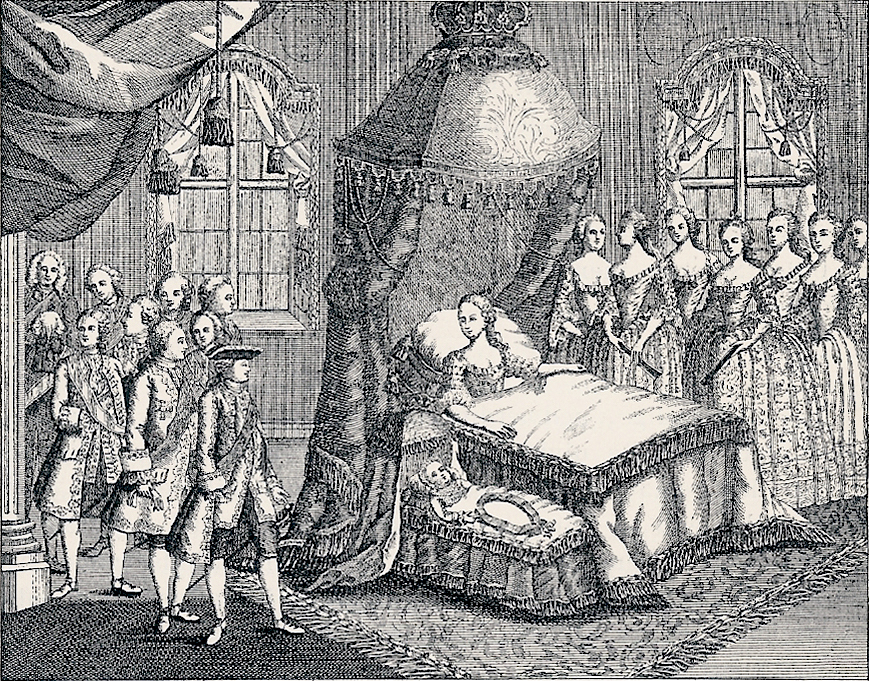
Engraving of Caroline Matilda after giving birth to the future Frederick VI of Denmark

Caroline Matilda became close to her Overhofmesterinde, Louise von Plessen, who regarded the King's friends, such as Conrad Holck and Enevold Brandt, as immoral and acted to isolate Caroline Matilda from her spouse. This was not difficult, as Christian VII did not like her. The couple were further estranged when Louise von Plessen advised Caroline Matilda to claim to be indisposed when the King expressed a wish for physical intimacy, with the thought that distance would make the King more eager; instead, though, it only made him more unwilling. At the end, and after being persuaded by his old tutor Reverdil, Christian VII consummated his marriage for the sake of the succession, and after the Queen gave birth to Crown Prince Frederick on 28 January 1768, he turned his interest to the brothels of Copenhagen.

Though Caroline Matilda was not interested in politics, after the birth of an heir, she came to play a key role at the court. Her dislike of her husband's favourites increased when, in 1768, Holck managed to exile Louise von Plessen from court, leaving the Queen even more isolated. She refused to accept von Plessen's successor, Anne Sofie von Berckentin, whom she suspected had taken part in the plot to exile Plessen. Thus, Plessen was not replaced until Margrethe von der Lühe agreed to accept the post in 1768.

In May 1768 Christian VII took a long tour of Europe, including stays in Altona, Paris, and London. During his absence, Caroline Matilda took care of her son and aroused attention when she took walks in Copenhagen; this was considered scandalous, as royal and noble Danish women normally only travelled in town by carriage. Caroline Matilda spent the summer at Frederiksborg Castle with her son before returning to Copenhagen in the autumn. During the absence of the King, there were rumours about an affair of the Queen with a certain La Tour, a handsome actor and singer from the French-language theater Hofteatret. La Tour was the lover of her lady-in-waiting Elisabet von Eyben, but he was known to receive gifts from "a higher hand" and it was said that his visits to von Eyben's chamber were in fact visits to the Queen. The allegation of an affair is not considered to have been true, but La Tour was exiled after the return of the King, perhaps because the rumour was damaging enough in itself. In addition to von Eyben, Caroline Matilda made friends with Christine Sophie von Gähler, Anna Sofie Bülow, and Amalie Sophie Holstein, who were known for their love affairs. According to the letter writer Luise Gramm, they encouraged her to participate more in social life, dance, and flirt.

=== Affair and scandal ===
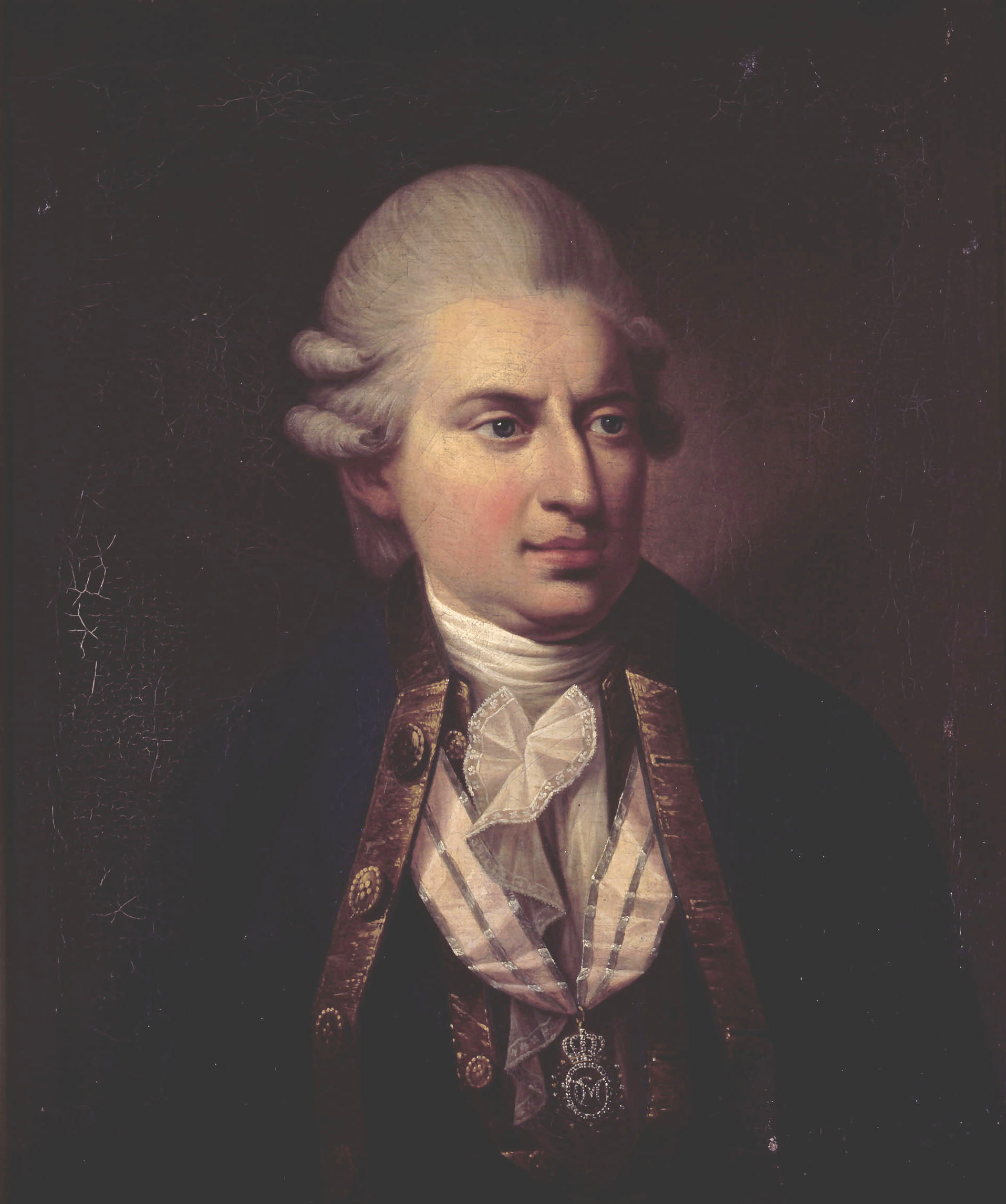
Royal physician Johann Friedrich Struensee

The King returned to Copenhagen on 12 January 1769, bringing with him Johann Friedrich Struensee as Royal Physician. He had met Struensee in Altona at the beginning of his travels. During 1769, the King's mental health deteriorated, but Struensee could apparently handle the King's instability, to the great relief of the King's advisers, and Christian VII developed a confidence in him. During 1769, Struensee encouraged the King in his attraction to Birgitte Sofie Gabel, reportedly because he believed a relationship with an intelligent woman would make the King more mentally stable and his insanity easier to handle, but this project failed, and the attempt to provide the King with a mistress made the Queen hostile toward Struensee.

Struensee then encouraged the King to improve his relationship with Caroline Matilda, and Christian VII showed his attention to her with a three-day birthday celebration on 22 July 1769. The Queen was well aware that Struensee was behind her husband's improved behavior. Her gratitude was reflected in her new interest in the charming doctor. In the summer of 1769, Caroline Matilda had an attack of dropsy, and at the insistence of her husband, she turned to Struensee. He advised the Queen that entertainment and exercise were the best medicine; this advice helped Caroline Matilda, and Struensee gained credibility with her. Her confidence in him was further strengthened when Struensee successfully inoculated the infant Crown Prince Frederick against smallpox. The attraction that had arisen between the Queen and Struensee amused the King. In January 1770, Struensee was given his own rooms at Christiansborg Palace. In the meantime, the King became more and more passive, isolated and uninvolved in government as his mental health deteriorated. He entrusted more and more of the daily state affairs to Struensee, as he had by then become accustomed to trusting him.

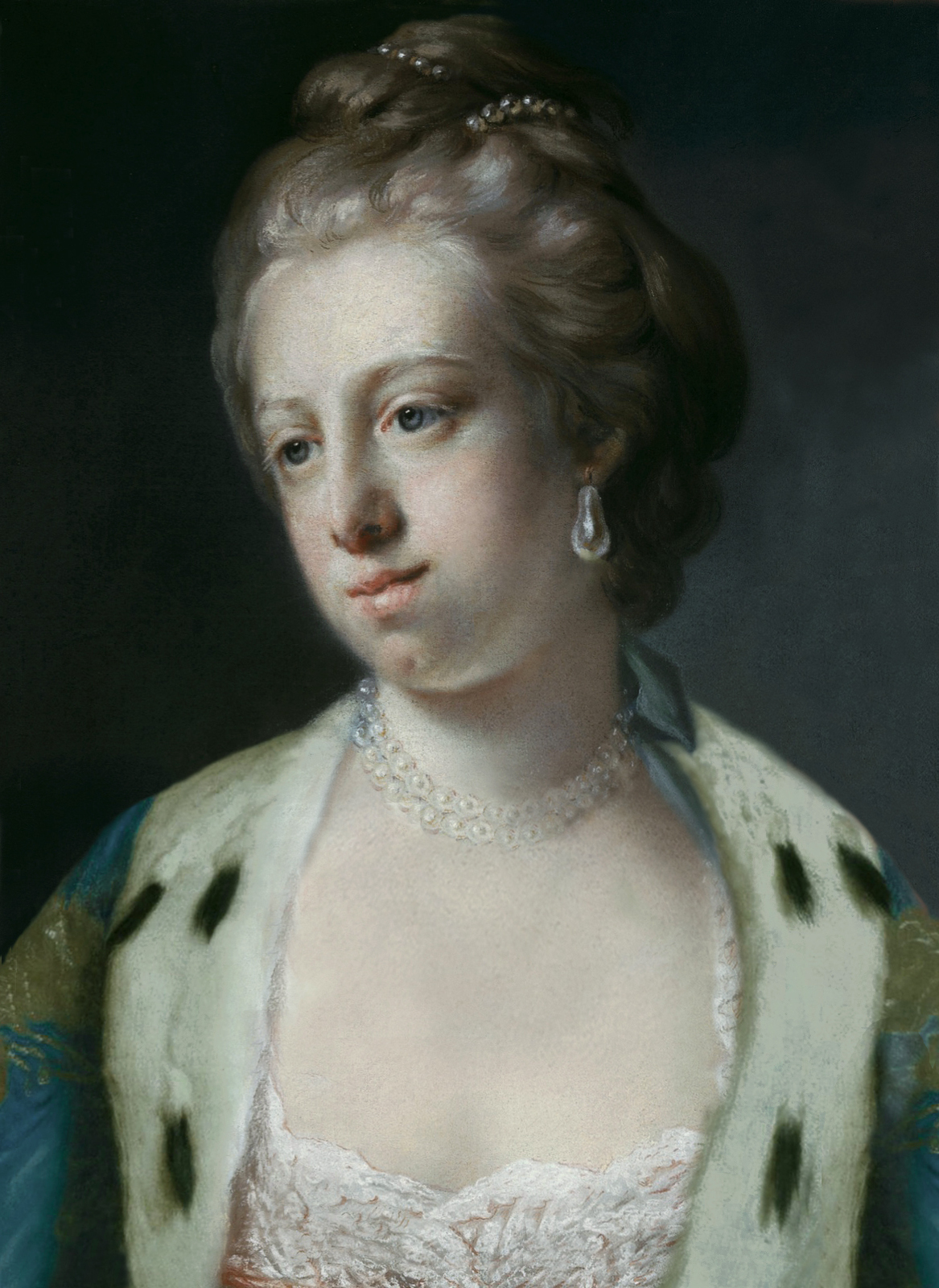
Pastel by Francis Cotes, 1766

By the spring of 1770, Struensee had become the Queen's lover. Later, during the divorce proceedings between Caroline Matilda and Christian VII, courtiers who accompanied the Queen during this time reported that they had suspected an affair since at least late 1769. The rumours forced the Queen to limit her contact with Struensee for a while, but not for long: by the summer of 1770 Caroline Matilda and Struensee were known to be close throughout the capital and the provinces. When the royal couple made a tour through the duchies of Schleswig and Holstein and the German border, accompanied by Struensee, he and the Queen were observed behaving in a suspicious manner towards each other, and rumors started spreading that they were lovers. With the help of Caroline Matilda, Struensee was able to expel Holck and other political enemies from court, including Margrethe von der Lühe, Holck's sister and Royal Mistress of the Robes, who, despite her blood relation with Caroline Matilda's enemy, was close to her.

In the summer of 1770, Caroline Matilda's mother, the Dowager Princess of Wales, made a visit to the continent, where for various reasons she wanted to communicate with her daughter. The meeting was originally scheduled in Brunswick, but later was moved to Lüneburg, where Caroline Matilda saw her mother not earlier than August 1770. It was the last meeting between them; (Note: Princess Augusta of Saxe-Gotha died on 8 February 1772 in London; Caroline Matilda was arrested on the night of 16–17 January of that year and was detained until her exile in Celle on 28 May.) reportedly, the Queen received her in breeches, which at that time was regarded as scandalous. During this meeting, Struensee was constantly at the Queen's side, so the Dowager Princess of Wales had no opportunity to talk freely with her daughter and could only instruct Woodford, the British Minister to Saxe-Lauenburg, to caution Caroline Matilda about her behaviour. In the end, neither Woodford nor the Duke of Gloucester and Edinburgh (who visited his sister in the same year in Copenhagen) succeeded in this purpose.

In September 1770 came the fall of the Chancellor Count Johann Hartwig Ernst von Bernstorff, reportedly thanks to the intrigues of both Struensee and Caroline Matilda; when the Dowager Princess of Wales asked her daughter about these rumours, the Queen responded to her mother's lamentations with an arrogant phrase: "Pray, madam, allow me to govern my own kingdom as I please!" On 18 December Struensee became Maître des Requêtes ("Master of Queries"; Privy Counsellor), and in July 1771 when he entered the cabinet it was declared that his orders would have the same effect as if they were signed by the King himself; on 22 July (the day of the Queen's birthday) the signatures of Struensee and his assistant Count Enevold Brandt were officially announced. From then, Struensee's authority became paramount, and he held absolute sway between 20 March 1771 and 16 January 1772: this period is known as the "Time of Struensee".

Caroline Matilda's royal monogram

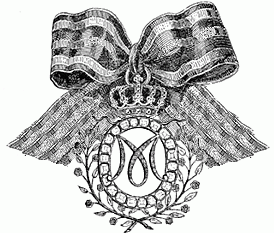
The Mathildeordenen

On 29 January 1771, in honour of the King's birthday, the Queen founded the Mathildeordenen. The Order has one class, and was intended to honour the royal family and their closest friends. The badge of the Order was a monogram "M", framed by a circle of precious stones and branches covered with green enamel. The Order was suspended on a pink ribbon with three silver stripes. A man wore the Order on a tape around his neck, and a lady with a bow on the chest. The Order Charter consisted of seven articles, and was written in French. Presentation of the Order was held once in the same day, at the dinner in honour of the King's birthday: it was granted to twelve people, amongst whom were Caroline Matilda herself, Struensee, Christian VII, the Queen Dowager Juliana Maria, Prince Frederick (the King's half-brother), and Struensee's close friends. After the coup in 1772 that resulted in the execution of Struensee and the exile of Caroline Matilda, the Order was abolished.

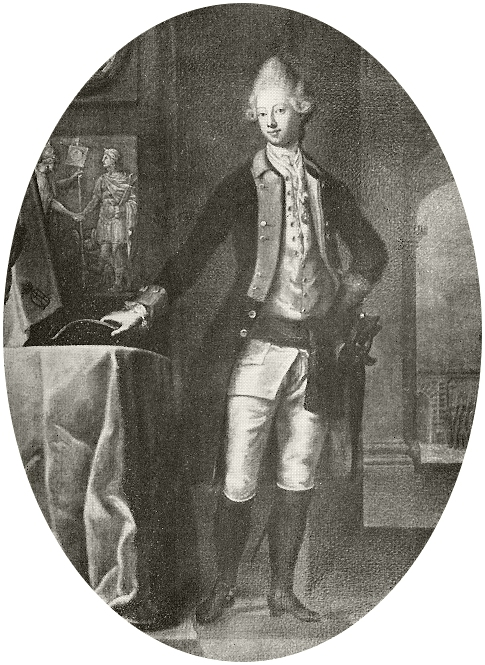
Caroline Matilda often dressed in male attire, here in the Queen's Life Regiment uniform.

Having virtually unlimited power, Struensee issued no fewer than 1069 cabinet orders, or more than three a day; for this reason, he has been criticised for having an imprudent "mania" for reform (despite the fact that all these orders were based on sound, rational principles) and because he did not follow native Danish and Norwegian customs, seeing them as prejudices and wanting to eliminate them in favour of abstract principles. This led to his extreme unpopularity among the conservative circles at court, led by the Dowager Queen Juliana Maria of Brunswick-Wolfenbüttel and her son Prince Frederick. Caroline Matilda shared in her lover's unpopularity because of her support for his reforms and her behaviour, which was offensive to a nation that had a traditional veneration for the royal House of Oldenburg, and brought the Crown into contempt: her way of openly demonstrating her new happiness was seen as shocking, as when the couple reportedly barely concealed their affair during the masked balls of Caroline von Schimmelmann.

Until now without influence, Caroline Matilda became the centre of the Court's attention, and gathered followers called the Dronningens Parti ("The Queen's Party"). She gained a new confidence, and showed herself in public riding astride on horseback, dressed as a man. This was seen as scandalous, and according to Luise Gramm, she had been encouraged to do this by her lady-in-waiting Elisabet von Eyben. Struensee introduced a reform in which burgher-class people were allowed to dine informally with the royal family, and the Queen acquired friends outside the aristocracy such as Johanne Marie Malleville, which was seen as a scandal.

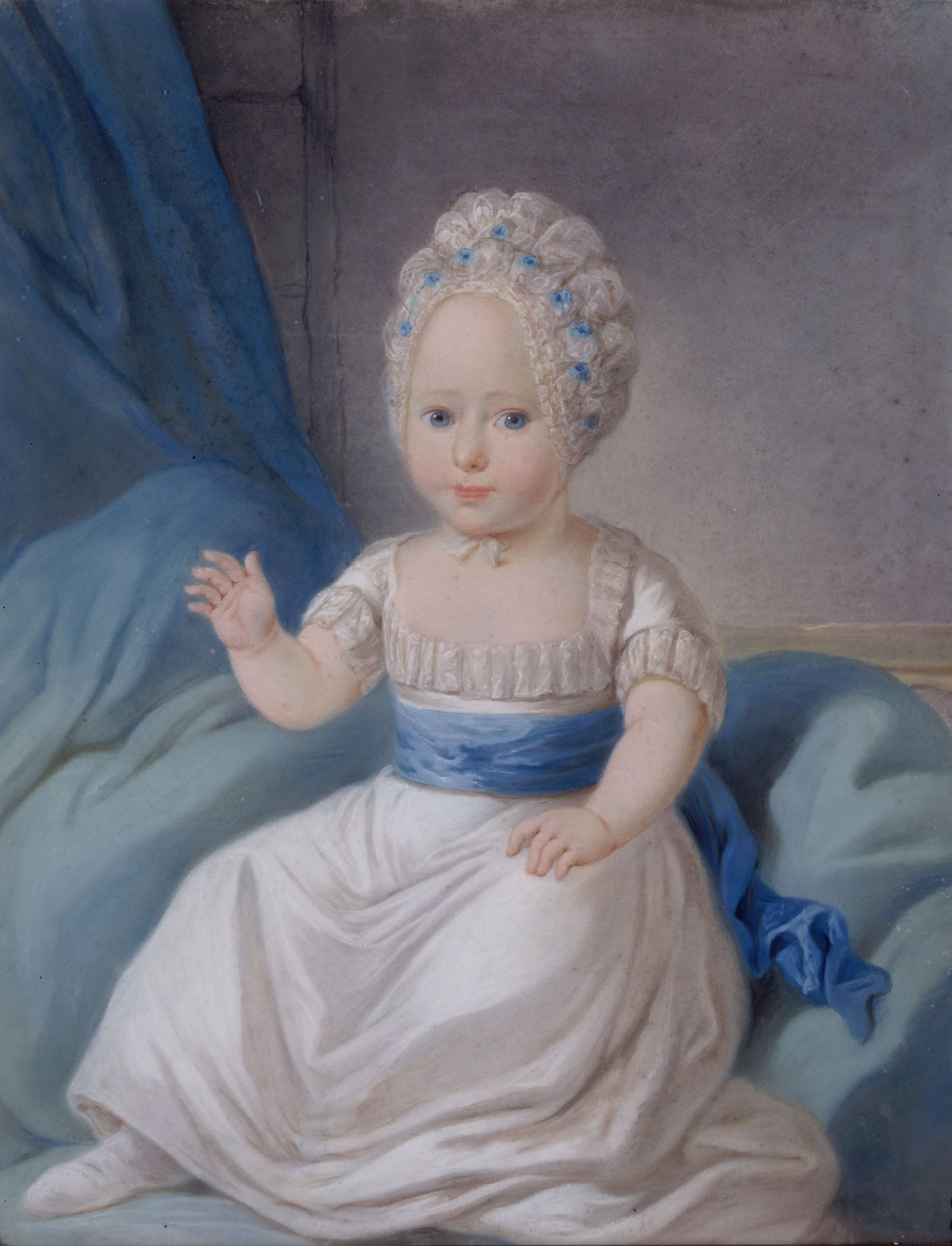
Princess Louise Augusta, by Helfrich Peter Sturz, 1771

On 17 June 1771 the court took summer residence at Hirschholm Palace in present-day Hørsholm municipality. Here, Caroline Matilda lived happily with her son and her lover, and was painted with the Crown Prince in the style of the newly modern country life by Peter Als; this summer is described as an idyll, and has come to be referred to as the "Hirschholm Summer" in Danish historiography. She also planned a new summer villa, Frydenlund in Vedbæk. One month later, on 7 July, the Queen gave birth to a second child, a daughter named Louise Augusta. The event was coldly received at court, although the Dowager Queen Juliana Maria agreed to be the newborn's godmother if the Queen agreed. The King recognised the paternity of the child, who officially became a Princess of Denmark and Norway, but the Queen's behaviour and the girl's resemblance to Struensee caused the courtiers to begin to think that he was probably the biological father of the Princess, and to refer to her as "la petite Struensee". However, during the divorce proceeding against Caroline Matilda, her daughter was never mentioned in any document, because Struensee had previously given "satisfactory answers" about the circumstances of her birth.

Shortly after Louise Augusta's birth, rumours began in the court and population that Caroline Matilda and Struensee wanted to imprison the King and declare the Queen regent; these accusations in fact were absurd in themselves, as Christian VII was more a protection than an obstacle to the lovers. By the end of 1771 the lovers began to worry, and Caroline Matilda suspected that the Dowager Queen Juliana Maria planned a plot against her and Struensee. In October, Struensee thought it necessary to abolish freedom of the press, which was one of his major reforms. According to legend, Struensee rushed to the Queen's feet, begging her to let him leave the country for both their sakes, but Caroline Matilda refused to let him go. At the same time he confessed to one of his friends it was only thanks to the support of the Queen that he retained his post. On 30 November the court moved to Frederiksberg Palace, where security measures had been increased by orders of Struensee. Then the order to disband the Royal Guard caused a military march to Fredericksberg on Christmas Eve, and the court became clear about the real mood of the people. At the same time, there were rumours that the British diplomat Robert Murray Keith proposed to give Struensee a large sum of money if he were to leave the country, but there is no documentary evidence for this.

The court returned to Copenhagen on 8 January 1772. By this time, Struensee and Caroline Matilda were already in serious danger. In early January, a former supporter of Struensee, Count Schack Carl Rantzau, discontented with the fact that Struensee did not accept his political views, decided to overthrow the favourite. Dowager Queen Juliana Maria had during the summer watched the progress of events from Fredensborg Palace, where she lived in seclusion with her son. Rantzau gave her fake evidence that the lovers were going to overthrow the King, prompting the Dowager Queen to act against them. Details of the case were specified on 15 January at the Dowager's residence, and the execution of their conspiracy was scheduled for the night of 16–17 January, after the end of a masked ball at the Hofteatret in Christiansborg Palace. Although Rantzau hesitated at the last moment, everything went according to plan: at the agreed time, Struensee, Brandt, and their followers were arrested.

On the same night Caroline Matilda was captured by Rantzau who, with cynical cruelty, hastily escorted her with her daughter to Kronborg Castle, in Helsingør, where they remained imprisoned under close surveillance by guards. She was only accompanied by the maid-of-honour Frederikke Louise Møsting, who was not sympathetic towards her and who had been ordered by Rantzau to accompany her. As the Queen later told the court, on the evening of 17 January she saw from the windows of her chamber the festive illuminations made in honour of her fall in Copenhagen. Only a few friends were allowed to visit the Queen at Kronborg, where her only consolation was her daughter, because her son the Crown Prince stayed with his father. At Kronborg, she was attended by the maids-of-honour Frederikke Louise Møsting, Sofie Magdalene Sperling, Margrete Vilhelmine Schmettau, her chamberlain count Christian Frederik Holstein and courtier Karl Adolf Råben, "who were all against her", while her favourite maid-of-honour Charlotte Amalie Trolle had been refused permission to accompany her. The fall of Caroline Matilda was necessary to overthrow Struensee, although he had not achieved power thanks to the Queen, but because of his dominance over the King; however, the Queen was a powerful ally of his, and for this reason it was necessary to remove them at the same time.

=== Divorce and exile ===
The interrogation of Johann Friedrich Struensee began on 20 February 1772, but concerning the "crime of familiarity" with respect to the Queen, he admitted to nothing for three days. Later, he tried to shift much of the responsibility for the adultery onto Caroline Matilda. Struensee's main political associate and friend, Enevold Brandt, was interrogated at the same time, and reportedly admitted his knowledge of the favourite's crimes. In parallel to this, the Queen's staff were also questioned, and the testimony of her chamber staff, particularly her head chamber woman Charlotta Hedevig Matthie, her lady's maids Kristine Sofie Frederikke Bruun, Anna Charlotte Margrete Horn and Engel Marie Arensbach, and her chamber maid Anna Petersen, were particularly incriminating, as well as that of her lady-in-waiting Elisabeth von Eyben.

A committee of four nobles was sent to Kronborg to interrogate the Queen; during their first visit, probably following the advice of Keith, Caroline Matilda refused to speak with them, replying that "she doesn't recognise anyone's court other than the court of the King." On their later visits, she denied her relationship with Struensee in the hope of saving him. On 9 March, a confession signed by Struensee was presented to Caroline Matilda; she also signed a confession and took much of the blame on herself, hoping thus to mitigate the fate of her lover, although she is believed to have been pressed or manipulated to admit the affair by the interrogator.

On 24 March an indictment against the Queen was presented to a court consisting of thirty-five members of the nobility; on 2 April she was given a lawyer, who said that the Queen was innocent and her confession was signed under pressure, and solely to protect Struensee. The judgment was handed down on 6 April and two days later the Queen was notified: her marriage with Christian VII was dissolved, although not on dynastic or moral grounds; in addition, the name of the former Queen was banned during church services. Struensee and Brandt were sentenced to death, and were executed on 28 April. As Caroline Matilda later recalled, she intuitively knew about the death of her lover.

In Great Britain the news of the arrest of Caroline Matilda was met with great excitement. After the divorce, and following the orders of her brother King George III, Robert Murray Keith began to negotiate her release, but without success. At the same time, George III had been provided conclusive evidence against his sister, and it was reported that he was advised that she could not remain at the Danish court. After Caroline Matilda's death, it was discovered that the Danes had offered to send Struensee and his allies into exile in Aalborg in north Jutland, but the British government strongly refused to consent to this and even threatened to break diplomatic relations with Denmark-Norway and begin a military intervention. A British squadron arrived off the shores of Copenhagen, but a few hours before its arrival George III received the news that the Danish government guaranteed the freedom of the former Queen. Keith was also able to secure the return of her dowry, a pension, and Caroline Matilda's right to retain her royal title.

By May 1772 the British and Danish governments had been able to figure out where Caroline Matilda would live; at the suggestion of George III, the new residence of his "Criminal Sister" was to be Celle Castle, located in the Electorate of Hanover. On 3 May the former Queen, accompanied by Keith and a delegation of Danish nobles, departed from Helsingør in two frigates and a sloop; her two children, Crown Prince Frederick and Louise Augusta, remained in Copenhagen and she never saw them again. On 5 June she arrived in the district of Stade (where the Danish delegation finally left her), and was greeted in an elaborate ceremony, and the next day a reception was held in her honour. From Stade, the former Queen went to Göhrde, where she stayed for a few months before finally going to Celle. On 20 October Caroline Matilda made her solemn entry into the city, where a proper court was organised for her. Thereafter, she rarely left Celle, with only a few visits to Hanover.

=== Life in Celle ===
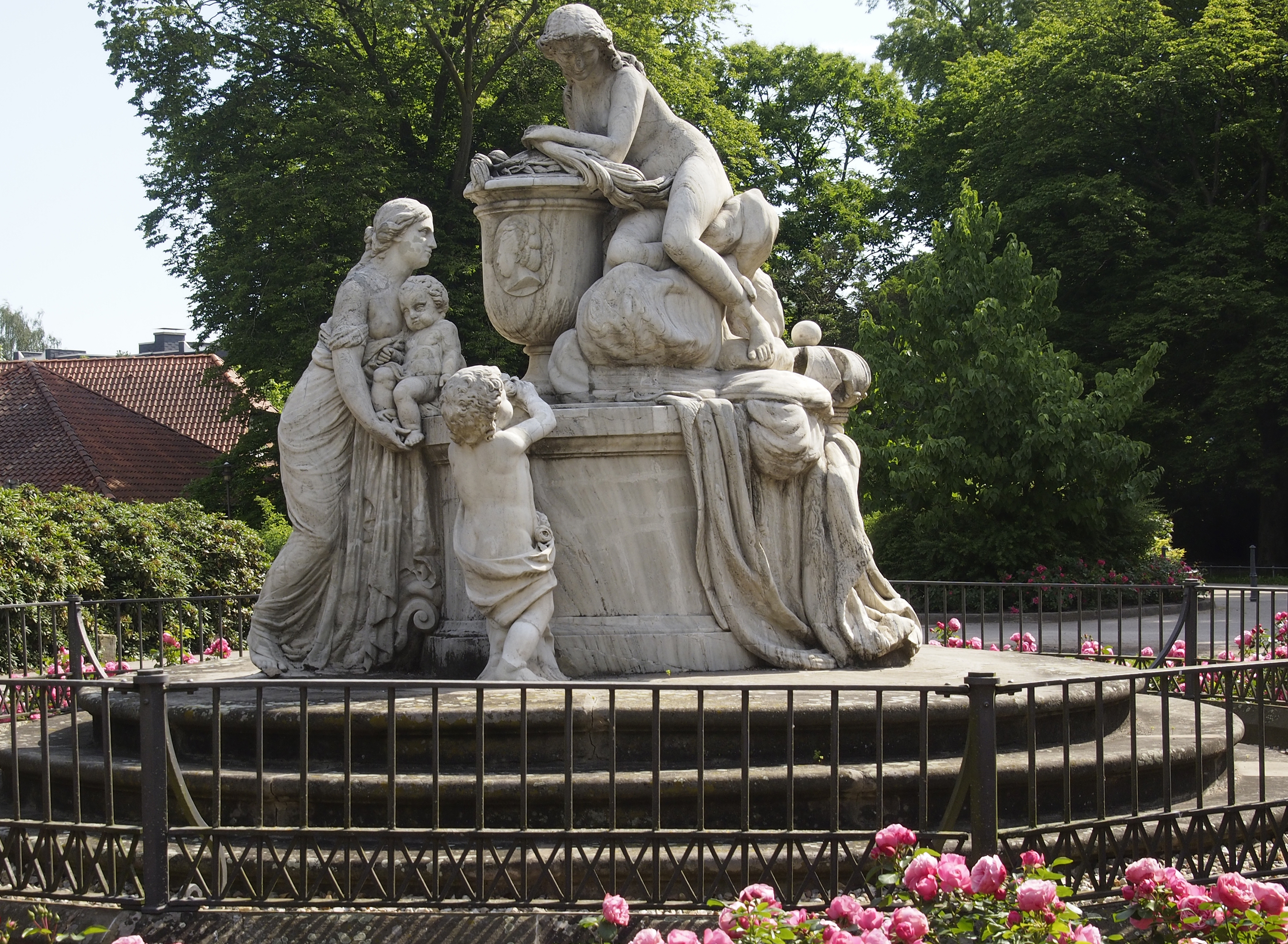
Monument in Celle, Germany.

In Celle, Caroline Matilda led a very quiet life. Here she was finally reunited with her beloved former hofmesterinde Countess Louise von Plessen. The former Queen was visited by many relatives and friends, among them her older sister Augusta, Duchess of Brunswick-Wolfenbüttel, which many contemporaries considered a way to keep her watched. Her main entertainment was a small theatre, built especially for her in the castle, as well a library with numerous books in German and English; in addition, she became known for her charity towards poor children and orphans. Keith, who visited Caroline Matilda in November 1772, later reported to Lord Suffolk that he had found her in a contented mood and that she did not want to have any relations with the Danish court except those that directly affected the well-being of her children.

Although no longer Queen, Caroline Matilda still played an important role in Danish politics, because she was the mother of the future King. In September 1774 she was visited by the traveller and adventurer Nathaniel Wraxall; during this visit he collected a lot of information about her life in Denmark that later formed the basis of his memoirs. He returned in October as a secret agent for a group of restive Danish nobles. Some were exiled in Hamburg for their support for the former Queen, notably Baron Frederik Ludvig Ernst Bülow (spouse of Anna Sofie Bülow), and Count Ernst von Schimmelmann (son of Caroline von Schimmelmann) and one remained in Copenhagen. They were eager for a change: the return of Caroline Matilda as regent and guardian of the Crown Prince. Caroline Matilda was ready to act, but only with the consent of her brother George III; she also feared for the lives of her children. George III was ready to support his sister and the plot, but on the condition that first, the conspirators had to gain enough power in Denmark. Wraxall visited the former Queen three more times in Celle and discussed with her the details of the plot; then he went to London, to discuss the plan with George III. With him, Caroline Matilda sent a letter to her brother, in which she asked for his approval for the conspiracy, which she referred to as "this scheme for my son's happiness". However, while waiting for an audience with the King in London, Wraxall learned of Caroline Matilda's death.

Caroline Matilda died suddenly of scarlet fever on 10 May 1775. On her deathbed, she wrote a letter to her brother in which she proclaimed her innocence. She was buried in the crypt of the Stadtkirche St. Marien near her paternal great-grandmother Sophia Dorothea of Brunswick-Lüneburg, who was also divorced and exiled.

Great Denmark Street in Dublin is believed to have been named in her honour in the year of her death.

== Issue ==
Name	Birth	Death	Notes
King Frederick VI of Denmark	28 January 1768	3 December 1839	married 1790, Princess Marie of Hesse-Kassel; had issue
Princess Louise Augusta of Denmark	7 July 1771	13 January 1843	married 1786, Frederick Christian II, Duke of Schleswig-Holstein-Sonderburg-Augustenburg; had issue

== Cultural depictions ==
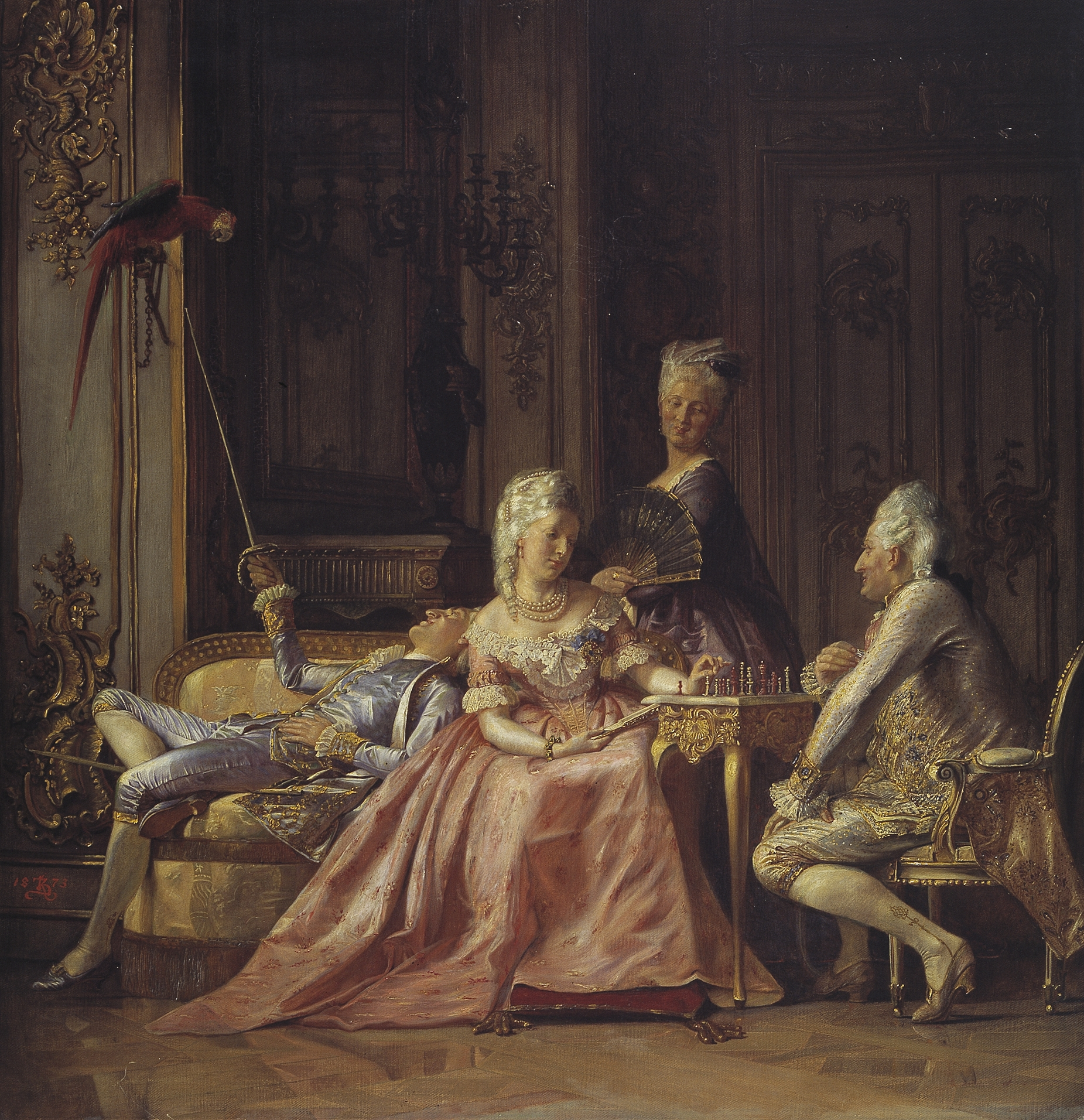
Kristian Zahrtmann: Scene from the court of Christian VII. History painting from 1873 at the Hirschsprung Collection.

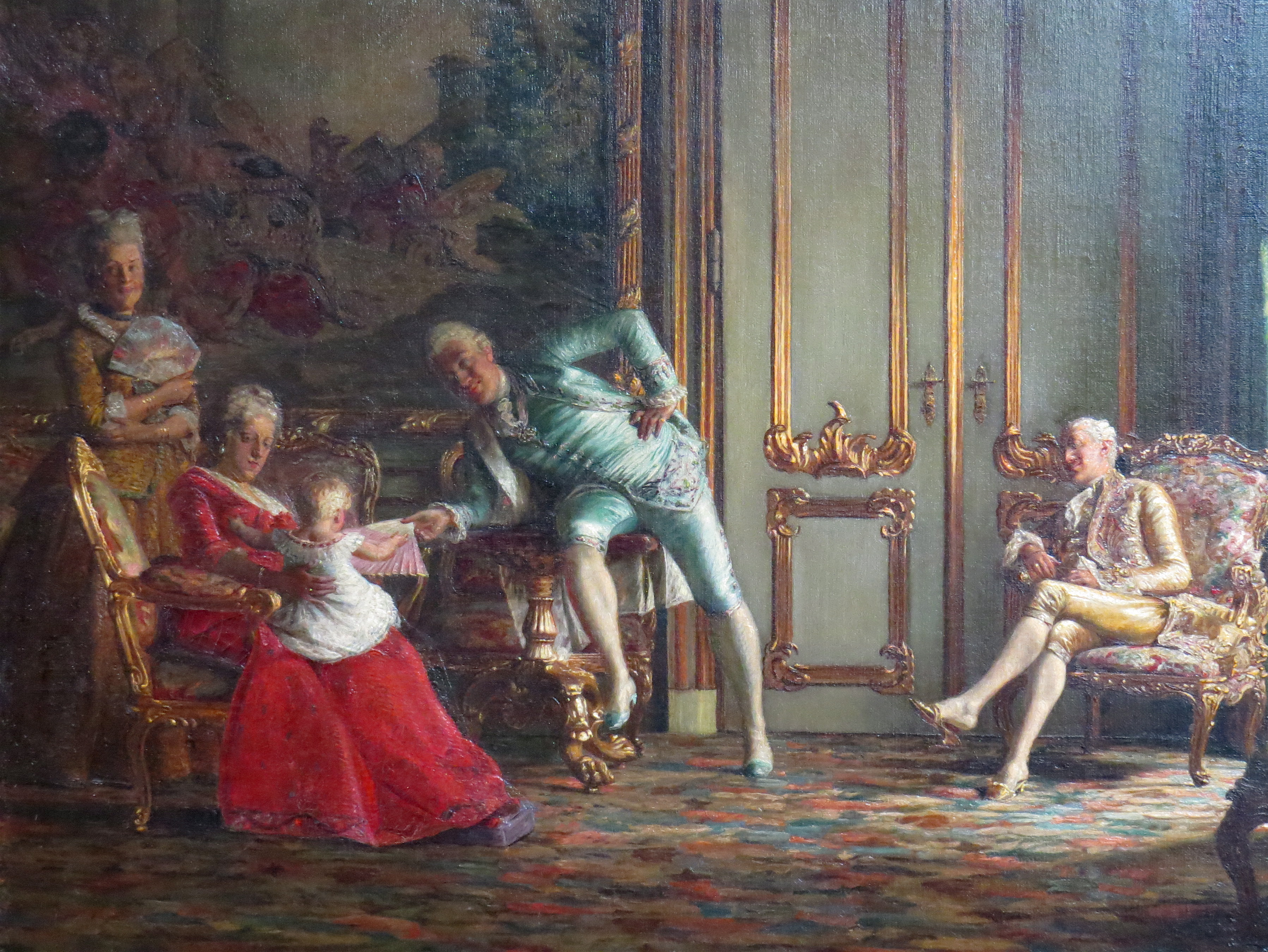
Kristian Zahrtmann: Interior from the court of Christian VII. History painting from 1881 at the Hirschsprung Collection.

Caroline Matilda, the story of her marriage, and her affair with Struensee has featured in many artistic works:

=== Literature ===
- 1827: Caroline Matilda, to Christian the Seventh of Denmark, a poem by Lydia Sigourney.
- 1935: Die Gefangene von Celle – a 1935 novel by Else von Hollander-Lossow
- 1935: The Favourite of the Queen (German: Struensee: Doktor, Diktator, Favorit und armer Sünder; later Der Favorit der Königin) – a 1935 novel by Robert Neumann
- 1948: The Queen's Physician – a 1948 novel by Edgar Maass
- 1953: Converse at Night in Copenhagen (Danish: Samtale om natten i København) – a 1953 novel by Karen Blixen
- 1955: Caroline Matilda, princess of Great Britain and queen of Denmark – a 1955 novel by Geoffrey Vaughan Blackstone
- 1969: The Lost Queen – a 1969 novel by Norah Lofts
- 1985: Letter from Celle – a 1985 dramatic poem by Edward Lowbury
- 1999: The Visit of the Royal Physician (Swedish: Livläkarens besök) – a 1999 novel by Per Olov Enquist
- 2000: Prinsesse af Blodet - en roman om Caroline Mathilde – a 2000 novel by Bodil Steensen-Leth
- 2015: There's a mad king in Denmark (Italian: C'è un re pazzo in Danimarca) – a 2015 biographical novel by Dario Fo

=== Stage ===
- 1827: Struensee – an 1827 drama by Michael Beer with stage music by his brother Giacomo Meyerbeer (Stuttgart and Tübingen: Cotta 1829, premiered in Munich in 1828). The play was originally forbidden under the rule of the Prussian King Frederick William III, and finally allowed by his more liberal successor Frederick William IV and premiered in Berlin in 1856.
- 1991: Caroline Mathilde – a 1991 two-act ballet staged by the Royal Danish Ballet and choreographed by Flemming Flindt to music by Sir Peter Maxwell Davies.
- 2008: The Visit of the Royal Physician (Danish: Livlægens besøg) – a 2008 opera staged by the Royal Danish Opera and composed by Bo Holten to a libretto based on Enquist's 1999 novel.

=== Film ===
- 1923: The Love of a Queen (German: Die Liebe einer Königin) – a 1923 German historical drama silent film directed by Ludwig Wolff, in which Queen Caroline Mathilde was portrayed by the German actress Henny Porten.
- 1935: The Dictator – a 1935 British film directed by Victor Saville, in which Caroline Mathilde was portrayed by the English actress Madeleine Carroll.
- 1957: King in Shadow (German: Herrscher ohne Krone) – a 1957 West German feature film directed by Harald Braun, and based on Neumann's 1935 novel, in which Caroline Mathilde was portrayed by the French actress Odile Versois.
- 2012: A Royal Affair (Danish: En kongelig affære) – an Academy Award-nominated Danish historical drama film directed by Nikolaj Arcel, in which Queen Caroline Matilda is portrayed by the Swedish actress Alicia Vikander.

== Ancestors ==
Ancestors of Caroline Matilda of Great Britain

8. George I of Great Britain
4. George II of Great Britain
9. Princess Sophia Dorothea of Brunswick-Celle
2. Frederick, Prince of Wales
10. John Frederick, Margrave of Brandenburg-Ansbach
5. Princess Caroline of Brandenburg-Ansbach
11. Princess Eleonore Erdmuthe of Saxe-Eisenach
1. Princess Caroline Matilda of Great Britain
12. Frederick I, Duke of Saxe-Gotha-Altenburg
6. Frederick II, Duke of Saxe-Gotha-Altenburg
13. Princess Magdalena Sibylle of Saxe-Weissenfels
3. Princess Augusta of Saxe-Gotha
14. Charles, Prince of Anhalt-Zerbst
7. Princess Magdalena Augusta of Anhalt-Zerbst
15. Princess Sophia of Saxe-Weissenfels

== Notes ==
Caroline Matilda of Great Britain House of Hanover Cadet branch of the House of Welf Born: 11 July 1751 Died: 10 May 1775
Royal titles
Vacant Title last held by Juliana Maria of Brunswick-Wolfenbüttel	Queen consort of Denmark and Norway; 1766–1772	Vacant Title next held by Marie Sophie of Hesse-Kassel
