= Princess Louisa of Great Britain =

British princess (1749–1768)

Princess Louisa
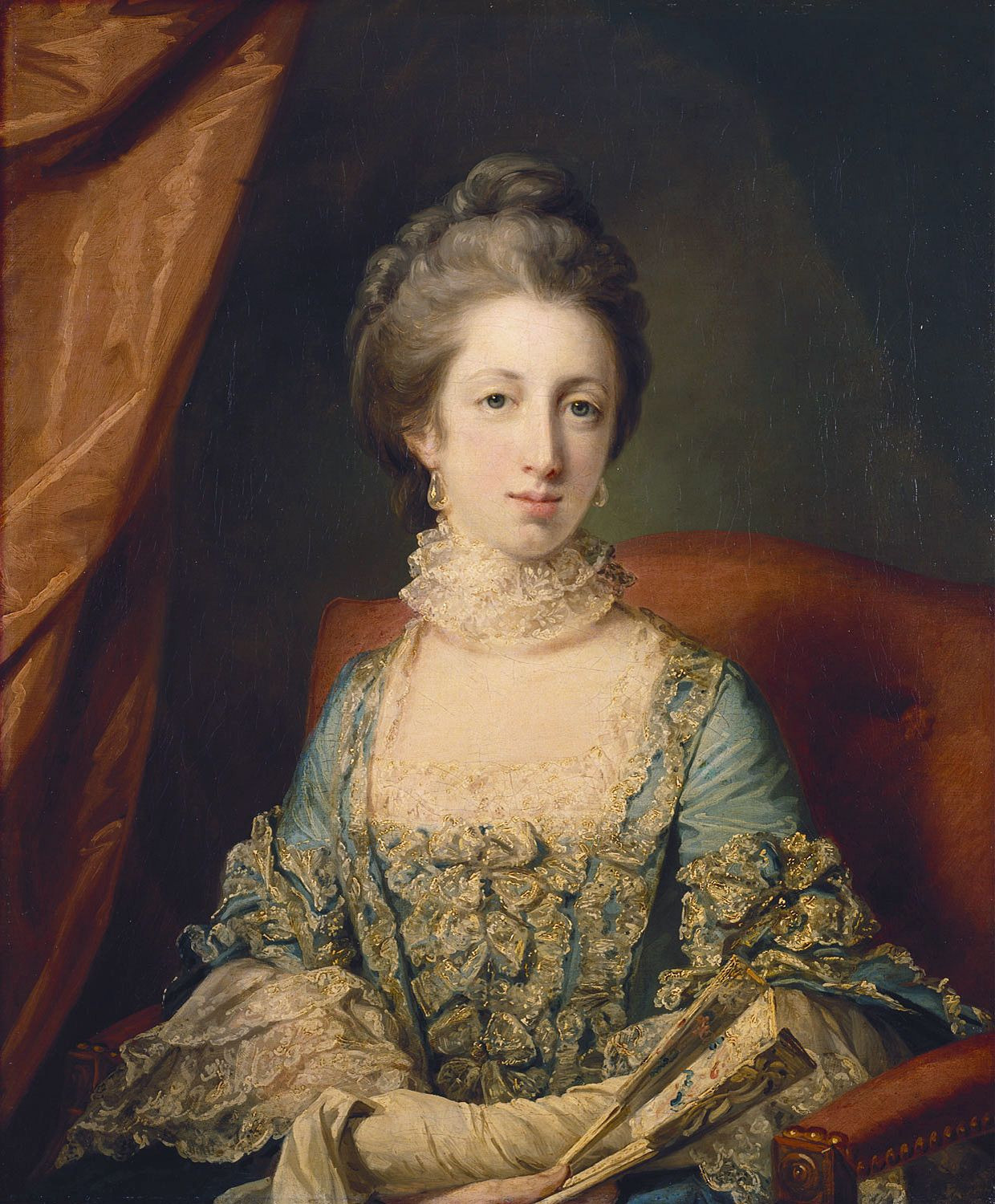
- Portrait of Louisa, c. 1765-1770
- Born: 19 March 1749; Leicester House, London
- Died: 13 May 1768 (aged 19); Carlton House, London
- Burial: 21 May 1768; Westminster Abbey
Names
- Louisa Anne
- House: Hanover
- Father: Frederick, Prince of Wales
- Mother: Princess Augusta of Saxe-Gotha

Princess Louisa of Great Britain (Louisa Anne; 19 March 1749 – 13 May 1768) was a grandchild of King George II and sister of King George III.

== Life ==
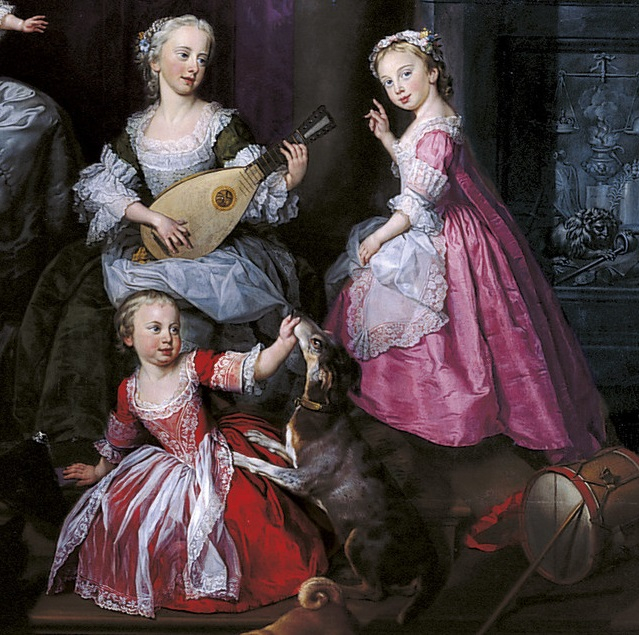
Princess Louisa (right) with her elder sister Elizabeth (left) and younger brother Frederick (below) in a family group portrait of 1751.

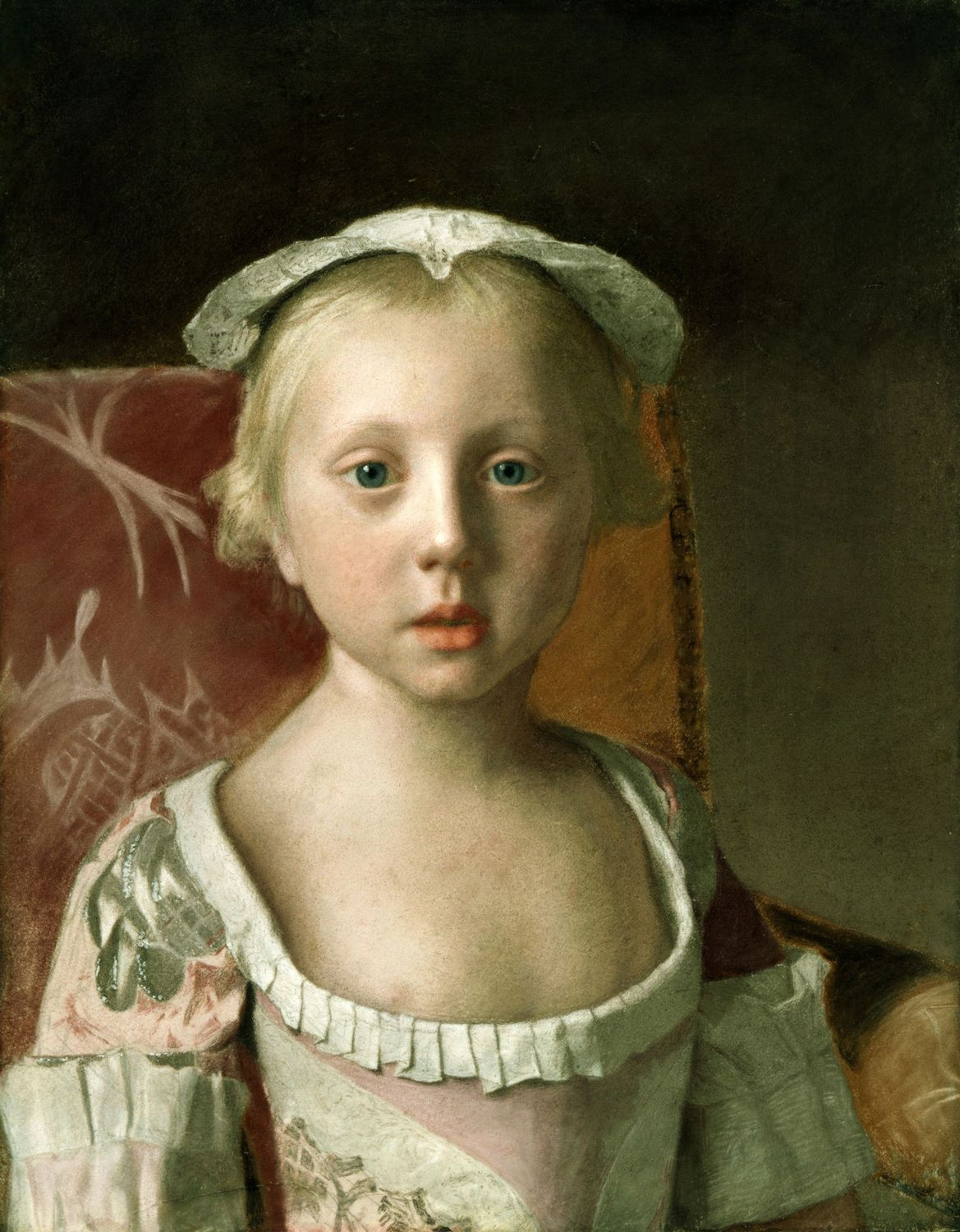
Portrait of Princess Louisa by Jean-Etienne Liotard, 1754

Princess Louisa was born on 19 March 1749, at Leicester House, Westminster, London, and was christened there on 11 April. Her father was Frederick, Prince of Wales, eldest son of George II and Caroline of Ansbach. Her mother was Princess Augusta of Saxe-Gotha. Her godparents were her paternal uncle Prince Frederick of Hesse-Kassel and aunts the Queen of Denmark and the Princess of Orange, all of whom were represented by proxies. She was reportedly close to her sister Caroline Matilda, who was close in age and was raised with her.

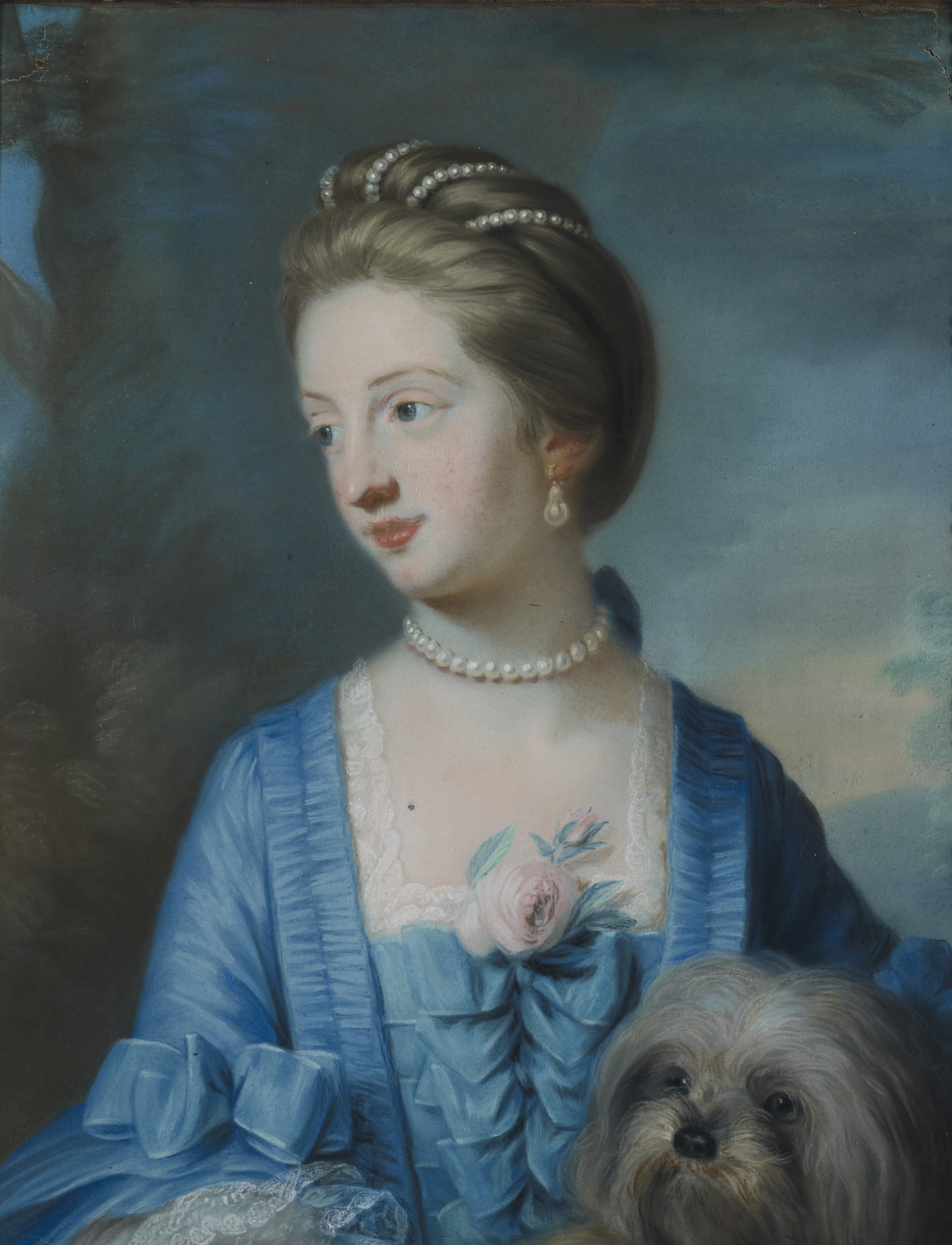
Portrait of Princess Louisa by Catherine Read, 1767

Her health was delicate throughout her life. According to Walpole, she "never appeared more than an unhealthy child of thirteen or fourteen". In 1764, negotiations were made between the British and Danish royal houses of a marriage between the Danish heir to the throne, Prince Christian, and a British princess. The marriage was considered suitable in status and welcomed by both houses, as there were few royal Protestant houses to choose between at that point for either party. The preferred choice for a bride was initially Princess Louisa, but after the Danish representative in London, Count Hans Caspar von Bothmer (1727-1787), was informed of her weak constitution, her younger sister Caroline Matilda was chosen for the match instead. The marriage was announced in Great Britain 10 January 1765.

The same year, 1764, she received a proposal from her brother's brother-in-law, Adolf Frederick of Mecklenburg-Strelitz, but negotiations were again deterred due to concerns regarding her health.

Reportedly, by the time her sister Caroline Matilda left Great Britain for Denmark in 1766, Louisa was succumbing to a more and more deteriorating state of health due to an advancing tuberculosis, which eventually turned her into an invalid.

Princess Louisa died, at Carlton House, London, on 13 May 1768, unmarried, and without issue, at the age of 19.

== Ancestors ==
Ancestors of Princess Louisa of Great Britain

8. George I of Great Britain
4. George II of Great Britain
9. Duchess Sophia Dorothea of Brunswick-Celle
2. Frederick, Prince of Wales
10. John Frederick, Margrave of Brandenburg-Ansbach
5. Princess Caroline of Brandenburg-Ansbach
11. Princess Eleonore Erdmuthe of Saxe-Eisenach
1. Princess Louisa of Great Britain
12. Frederick I, Duke of Saxe-Gotha-Altenburg
6. Frederick II, Duke of Saxe-Gotha-Altenburg
13. Princess Magdalena Sibylle of Saxe-Weissenfels
3. Princess Augusta of Saxe-Gotha
14. Charles, Prince of Anhalt-Zerbst
7. Princess Magdalena Augusta of Anhalt-Zerbst
15. Princess Sophia of Saxe-Weissenfels

== See also ==
- List of British princesses
