= Charlotte Elisabeth Henriette Holstein =

Danish noblewoman (1741–1809)

Charlotte Elisabeth Henriette Holstein née zu Inn- und Knyphausen (3 February 1741 – 18 May 1809, Vallø) was a Danish noblewoman. She served as Overhofmesterinde to Denmark's queen consort Caroline Matilda of Great Britain in 1770-1772.

== Life ==
By birth she was friherreinde (baroness) zu Inn- und Knyphausen.

On 20 May 1769, she married Christian Frederik Holstein, lensgrev (von) Holstein.

In 1770, she was appointed Mistress of the Robes to Denmark's queen consort Caroline Matilda of Great Britain in succession to Margrethe von der Lühe. She was a lady of the Ordre de l'Union Parfaite (1770).

After the death of her spouse in 1799, she became deaconess of Vallø stift, where she later died.
