= Amalie Sophie Holstein =

Danish noblewoman and courtier (1748–1823)

Countess Amalie Sofie von Holstein née von Buchwaldt (9 1748 - 29 May 1823), was a Danish noblewoman and courtier of German origin, known for her love life and unconventional life style, known in history as one of the Three Graces of the Danish royal court.

== Life ==
She was the daughter of Schack von Buchwaldt-Johannisdorff (1705–1770) and his first wife, Eleonora Elisabet von Plessen-Basthorst. She married courtier Count Ulrik Adolf von Holstein in 1763. In 1765 her spouse was appointed ambassador to Berlin, however during a court ball she convinced the king to appoint another to the post because she did not wish to leave Denmark. Influencing government policy in this manner was regarded as a scandal. As a result, the king appointed her spouse to a post in the Danish countryside, which reportedly they both found a less than pleasing place to reside.

She was a cousin of Ida Hedevig von Moltke, and her relative Charlotte Elisabeth Henriette von Holstein served as the chief lady-in-waiting to queen Caroline Matilda. Upon the recommendation of the queen's friend Christine Sophie von Gähler, her spouse was given a political post by the queen's lover Johann Friedrich Struensee in 1770, which made it possible for the pair to return to court, and Amalie Sofie Holstein became a leading member of court life. Together with the Baroness Anna Sofie von Bülow and Countess Christine Sophie von Gähler, she became known as one of the Three Graces of the Danish royal court.

Amalie Sofie Holstein was described by contemporaries as friendly, with a good disposition and humor to her personality, beautiful though somewhat plump in her appearance, and as sympathetic and kind to those who knew her personally. She had a relationship with Enevold Brandt, who used his position with the king to pay off her gambling debts, and who left the position as the king's caretaker to Élie Salomon François Reverdil for her. Struensee disliked her because she allegedly made Brandt defiant toward him, and as her spouse proved himself not useful as a politician, the Holstein couple was allowed to stay at court only because of Brandt.

On the night of the fall of Struensee in January 1772, Brandt danced with Holstein at the masquerade ball, and when he escorted her from the ball, he told her that he was sure that their roles could not continue much longer. After the coup, her spouse was forced to resume his old post in the countryside, effectively banishing them from court once again. She gave birth to her only child in 1775 and became a widow in 1789.
