= Christian Frederik Holstein =

Danish court official (1735–1799)

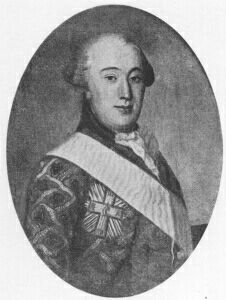
Christian Frederik Holstein

Count Christian Frederik Holstein (1735-1799), was a Danish court official. He was secretary of the royal Chancery from 1752, count of Ledreborg from 1763, director of the royal post office in 1762-66, chamberlain of the court of the queen, Caroline Matilda of Great Britain, in 1766-72, Overhofmarskal, chamberlain of the Danish royal court in 1772-80. He was the son of Johan Ludvig Holstein and Hedevig Vind and married Charlotte Elisabeth Henriette Holstein in 1769.
