= Élie Salomon François Reverdil =

Swiss politician (1732–1808)

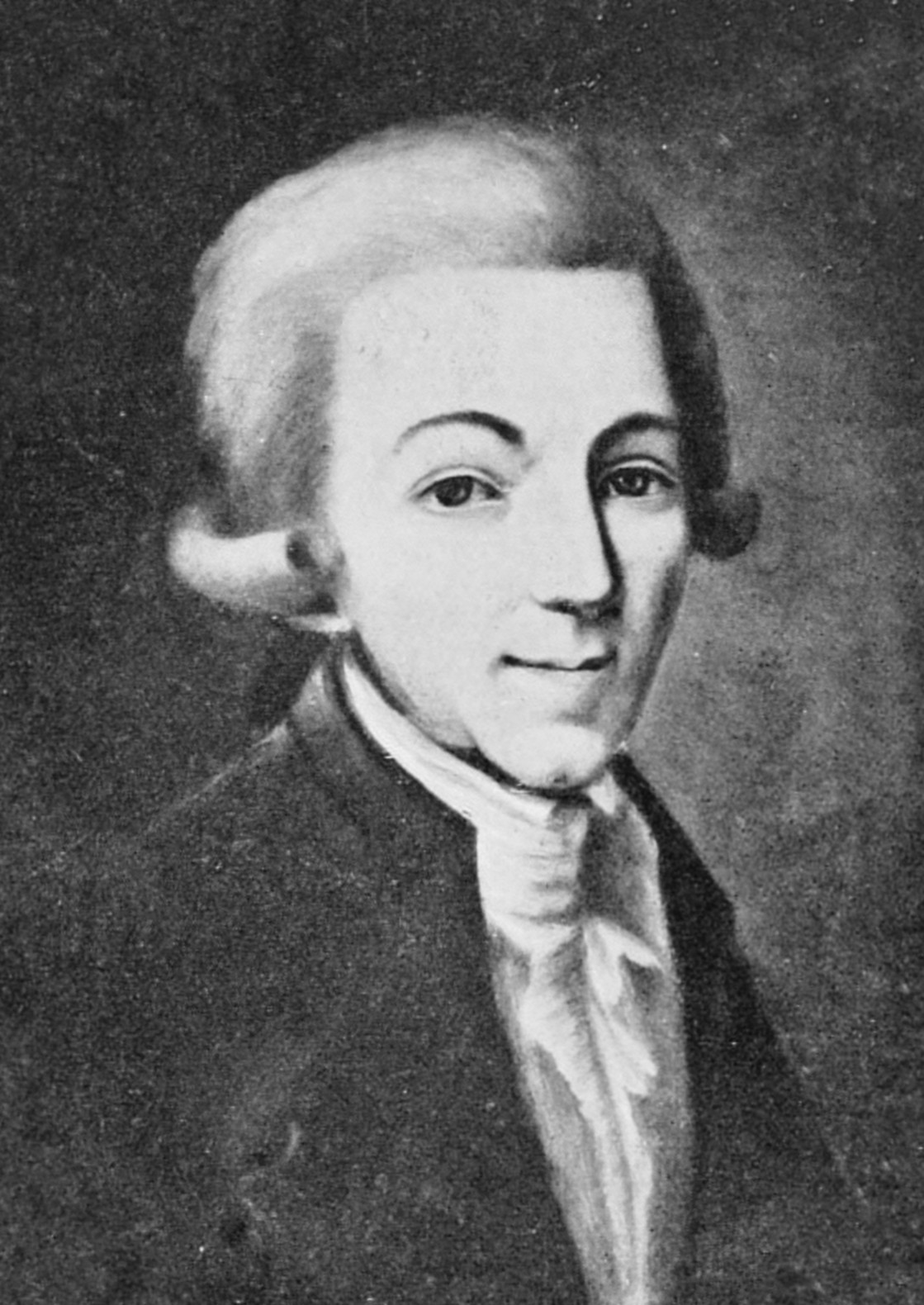
Élie-Salomon-François Reverdil

Élie Salomon François Reverdil (1732–1808) was a Swiss scholar.

Reverdil studied theology in Geneva, and was employed as a professor in mathematics at the academy of arts in Copenhagen in 1758. In 1760, he became a tutor to the future Christian VII of Denmark-Norway. When Christian became king in 1766, Reverdil was appointed reader and cabinet secretary. In 1767, he was exiled, likely because of the influence of the king's favorite Conrad Holck, and settled in Switzerland. In June 1771, Reverdil was recalled to Denmark by Struensee to become the companion and caretaker of the by now mentally ill king. He was exiled again after the fall of Struensee and returned to Switzerland.

He published memoirs of his time at the Danish court.
