= Enevold Brandt =

Danish courtier (1738–1772)

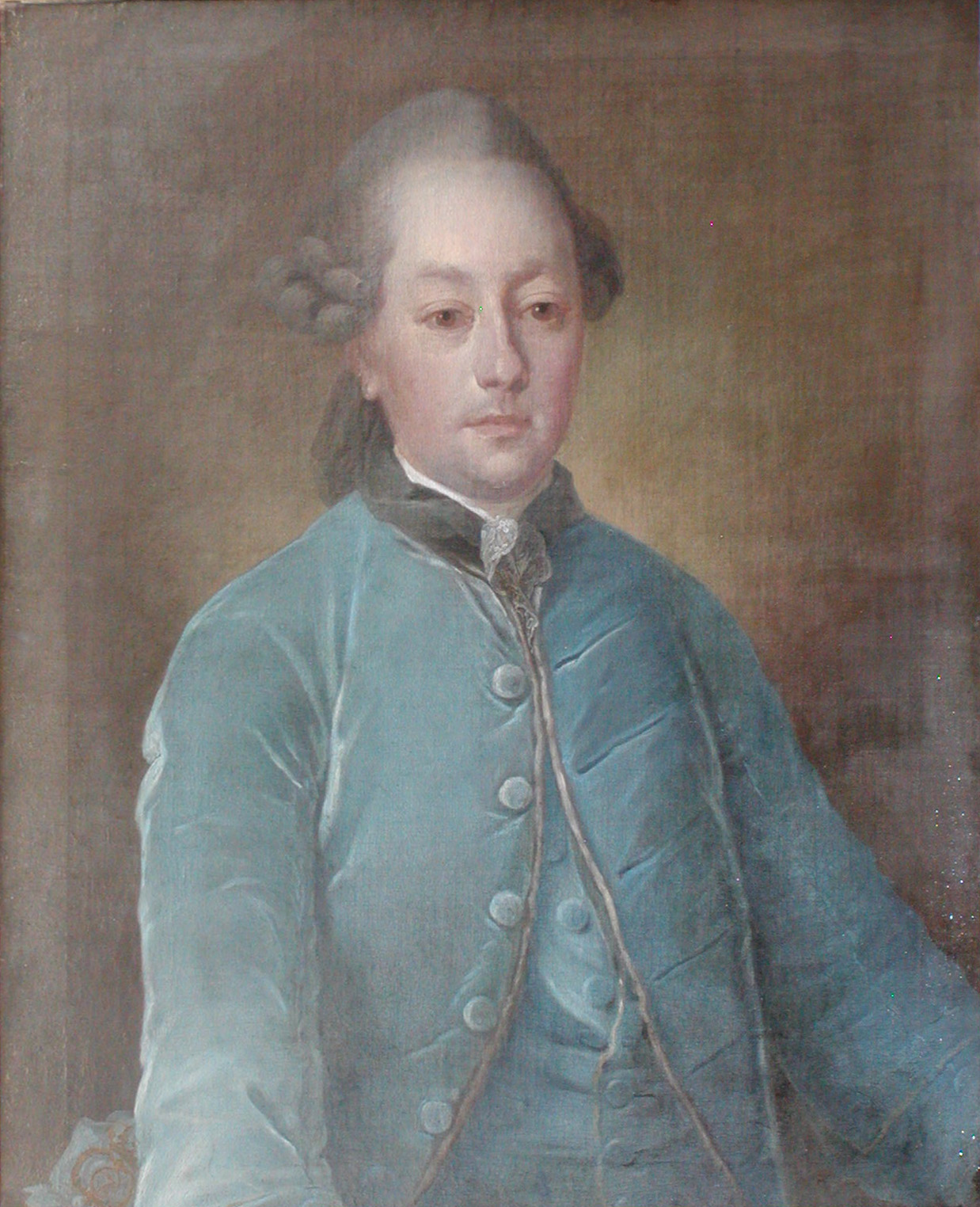
- Born: 7 September 1738; Copenhagen, Denmark–Norway
- Died: 28 April 1772 (aged 33); Copenhagen, Denmark–Norway

Count Enevold Brandt (7 September 1738 - 28 April 1772) was a Danish courtier.

== Biography ==
Brandt was born in Copenhagen, and studied law at the University of Copenhagen. He became assistant judge of the Supreme Court of Copenhagen in 1764, royal chamberlain in 1769, and afterwards superintendent of the Royal Theatre. In 1770, he replaced Conrad Holck as the companion and favorite of King Christian VII after the intervention of Struensee, who became his friend and de facto ruler of Denmark-Norway the same year.

Brandt had a relationship with Amalie Sophie Holstein, used his position with the king to pay off her gambling debts, and in practice left the position as the king's caretaker to Élie Salomon François Reverdil for her. Struensee disliked her because she allegedly made Brandt defiant toward him, and as her spouse proved himself not useful as a politician, the Holstein couple was allowed to stay at court because of Brandt.

He became involved in the coup d'état of 17 January 1772 and, together with his friend Struensee, to whose advancement he had contributed, was condemned to death, his execution following on 28 April 1772.
