= Conrad Holck =

Danish nobleman and courtier (1745–1800)

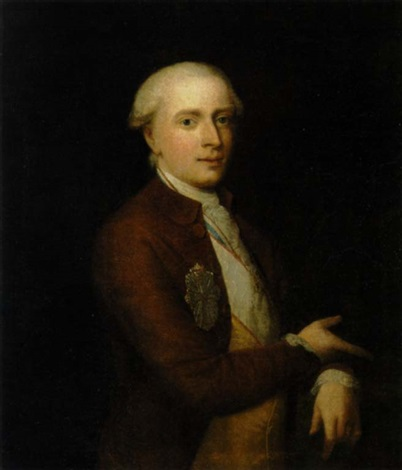
Portrait of Conrad Holck by Erik Pauelsen

Frederik Vilhelm Conrad Holck (28 September 1745 – 7 December 1800) was a Danish nobleman and courtier.

== Career ==
Through his parents, he was part of the Holck and Winterfeldt noble families and came to court as a chamber page at a young age. He was a favorite companion of king Christian VII of Denmark during the first years of his reign, and were regarded to have a bad influence upon the monarch by encouraging him in decadent pleasures and by distancing him from his consort Queen Caroline Matilda. He was appointed Chamberlain in 1767 and Privy Councilor (geheimeråd) in 1769. In 1768 he was awarded the Ordre de l'Union Parfaite and the Order of the Dannebrog.

In 1770, however, he was removed from court upon the influence of royal physician Johann Friedrich Struensee and replaced by Royal Chamberlain Enevold Brandt. In 1789, he obtained the office of county governor over Kiel, Cronshagen and Bordesholm. The remainder of his life was spent at Kiel.

== Personal life ==
Frederik Vilhelm Conrad Holck was born on 28 September 1745 at Orebygård to Major General Christian Christopher Holck (1698–1774) and Ermegaard Sophie Winterfeldt (1702–1756). He was one of eleven children, including Margrethe von der Lühe and Gustav Frederik Holck-Winterfeldt. He was raised on the family estate at Guldborgsund.

On 20 April 1768 he married Christiane de Stockfleth (1751–1768). After the death of his first wife, he remarried on 28 September 1769 to Juliane Sophie Grevinde Danneskiold Laurvig (1757–1790), daughter of Christian Conrad Danneskiold-Laurvig. He and Juliane Sophie had 9 children: Sophie Dorothea Louise (1774–1862), Christopher Conrad (1775–1810), Anna (1778–1835), Chritiane Margrethe (1779–1784), Frederikke Ernestine (1784–1838), Harald (1785–1839), Louise Augusta (1787–1867), Juliane Marie Cornelia (1788), and Julius Carl Christian (1789–1857).

He was married a third time in 1799 to Elisabeth Christine Anna von Ende (1761–1823), with whom he had a daughter: Ermegard Adelheid (1799). Holck died on 7 December 1800 in Kiel.
