= King in Shadow =

1957 film

- DVD cover
- German: Herrscher ohne Krone
- Directed by: Harald Braun
- Written by: Robert Neumann (novel); Odo Krohmann; Gerhard Menzel; Harald Braun
- Produced by: Harald Braun; Georg Richter
- Starring: O. W. Fischer; Odile Versois; Horst Buchholz
- Cinematography: Göran Strindberg
- Edited by: Hilwa von Boro
- Music by: Werner Eisbrenner
- Production company: Bavaria Film
- Distributed by: Schorcht Filmverleih
- Release date: 16 January 1957
- Running time: 104 minutes
- Country: West Germany
- Language: German

King in Shadow (German: Herrscher ohne Krone) is a 1957 Western German historical drama film directed by Harald Braun and starring O. W. Fischer, Odile Versois and Horst Buchholz. It was shot at the Bavaria Studios in Munich and on location in Hesse and Copenhagen. The film's sets were designed by the art director Walter Haag. The story had previously been portrayed in the 1935 British film The Dictator.

== Synopsis ==
The film portrays the interaction of Johann Friedrich Struensee, a doctor treating the mentally ill Christian VII of Denmark, and his English consort Caroline Matilda.

== Cast ==
- O. W. Fischer as Friedrich Struensee
- Odile Versois as Queen Mathilde
- Horst Buchholz as King Christian
- Fritz Tillmann as Count Rantzau
- Elisabeth Flickenschildt as Queen Juliane
- Ingeborg Schöner as Gertrud von Eyben
- Günther Hadank as State Minister Count Bernstorff
- Siegfried Lowitz as Chamberlain Guldberg
- Wilfried Jan Heyn as Baron Enevold Brandt
- Gerhard Ritter as Dr. Berger
- Peter Esser as Court Chaplain Münter
- Helmuth Lohner as Count Holck

== See also ==
- The Love of a Queen (1923)
- The Dictator (1935)
- A Royal Affair (2012)
