= Christian VII =

King of Denmark and Norway from 1766 to 1808

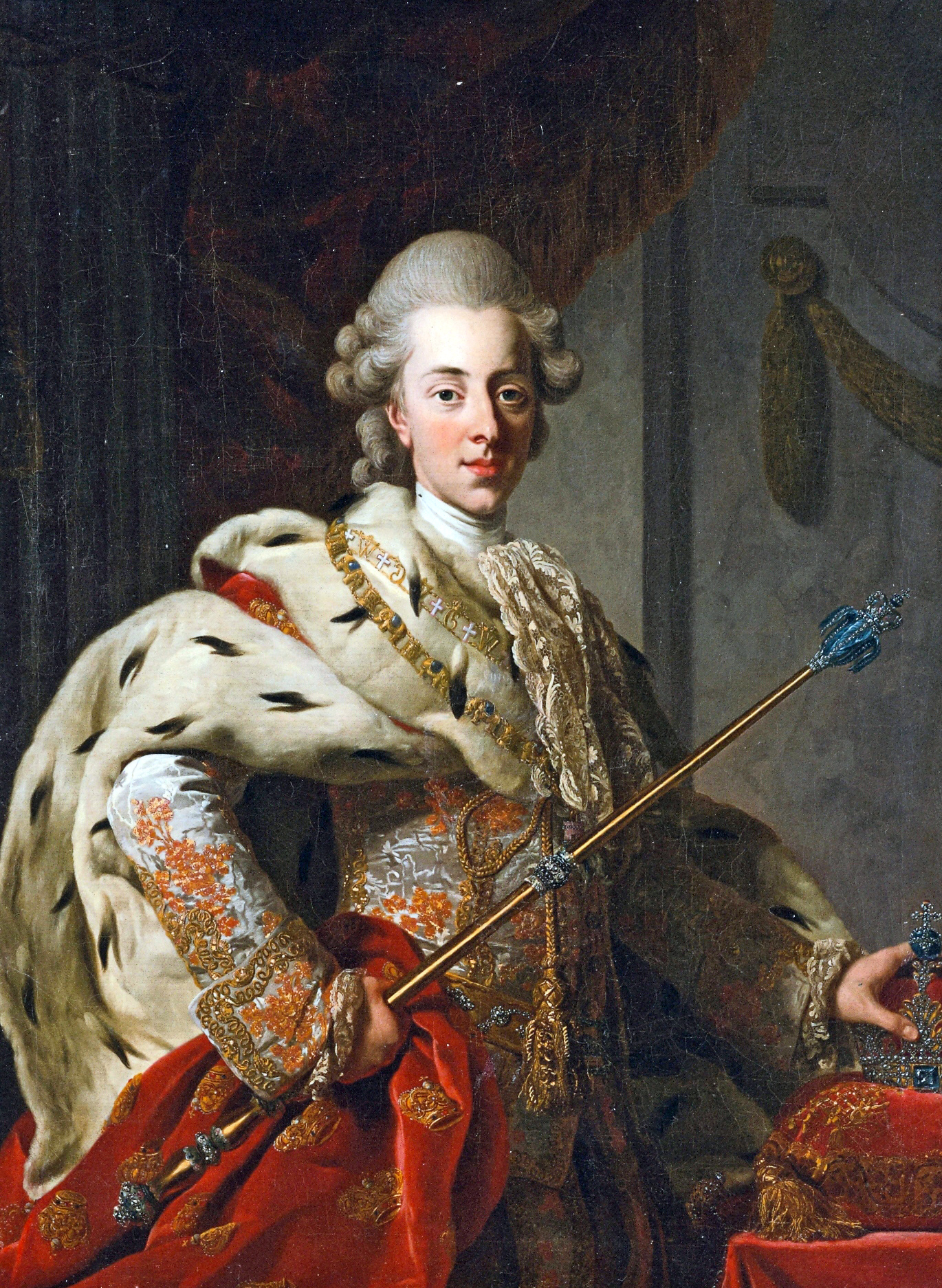
- Portrait by Alexander Roslin, c. 1772

King of Denmark and Norway
- Reign: 14 January 1766 – 13 March 1808
- Coronation: 1 May 1767; Christiansborg Palace Chapel
- Predecessor: Frederick V
- Successor: Frederick VI
- Regents: See list: Hereditary Prince Frederick (1772–1784); Juliana Maria of Brunswick-Wolfenbüttel (Without Official title, 1772 – 1784); Crown Prince Frederick (1784–1808)
- Chief Ministers: See list: Count Johann Hartwig Ernst von Bernstorff Johann Friedrich Struensee Ove Høegh-Guldberg Andreas Peter Bernstorff Christian Günther von Bernstorff
- Born: 29 January 1749; Christiansborg Palace, Copenhagen, Denmark
- Died: 13 March 1808 (aged 59); Rendsburg, Duchy of Holstein
- Burial: Roskilde Cathedral
- Spouse: Caroline Matilda of Great Britain (m. 1766; div. 1772)
- Issue: Frederick VI; Louise Auguste, Duchess of Schleswig-Holstein-Sonderburg-Augustenburg
- House: Oldenburg
- Father: Frederick V of Denmark
- Mother: Louise of Great Britain
- Religion: Lutheran

Christian VII (29 January 1749 – 13 March 1808) was King of Denmark and Norway and Duke of Schleswig and Holstein from 1766 until his death in 1808. He was affected by mental illness and was only nominally king for most of his reign. His royal advisers changed depending on the outcome of power struggles. From 1770 to 1772, his court physician Johann Friedrich Struensee was the de facto ruler of the country and introduced progressive reforms signed into law by the king. Struensee was deposed by a coup in 1772, after which the country was ruled by Christian's stepmother, Queen Dowager Juliane Marie of Brunswick-Wolfenbüttel, his half-brother Hereditary Prince Frederick, and the Danish politician Ove Høegh-Guldberg. From 1784 until Christian VII's death in 1808, Christian's son, later Frederick VI, acted as unofficial prince regent.

== Early life ==
=== Birth and family ===
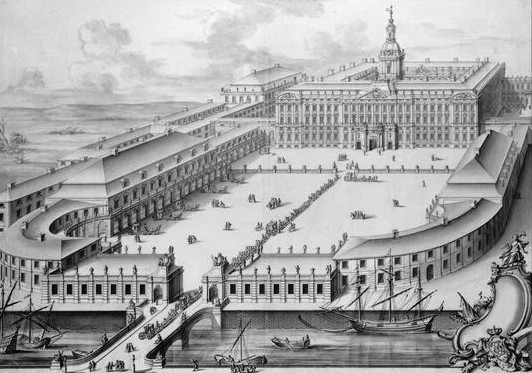
Christian's birthplace, Christiansborg Palace in Copenhagen, c. 1750

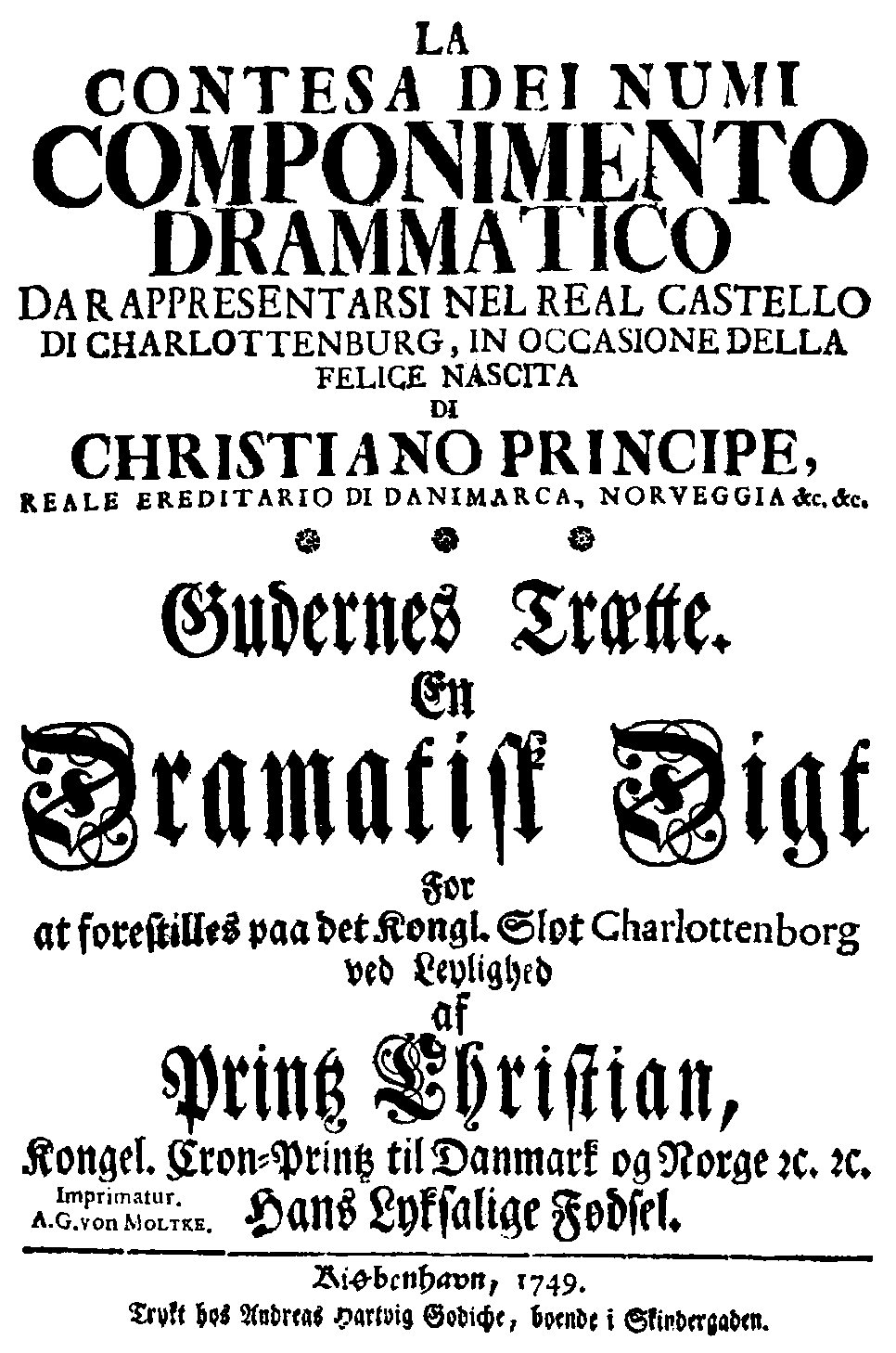
Title page of the libretto for La Contesa dei Numi, Copenhagen, 1749

Christian was born in the early hours of the morning on 29 January 1749 at Christiansborg Palace, the royal residence in Copenhagen. He was the fourth child and second son of the reigning monarch of Denmark–Norway, King Frederick V, and his first wife Louise of Great Britain. The newborn prince was baptized later the same day in the afternoon by the royal confessor Johannes Bartholomæus Bluhme, and was named after his late grandfather, King Christian VI. His godparents were King Frederick V (his father), Queen Dowager Sophie Magdalene (his paternal grandmother), Princess Louise (his aunt) and Princess Charlotte Amalie (his grand-aunt).

A former heir to the throne, also named Christian, had died in infancy in 1747, and the newborn was thus crown prince from birth; therefore, hopes were high for the future of the new heir apparent. Christoph Willibald Gluck, then conductor of the royal opera troupe, composed the opera La Contesa dei Numi (The contention of the gods), in which the Olympian gods gather at the banks of the Great Belt and discuss who in particular should protect the new prince.

At birth, Christian had two elder sisters, Princess Sophia Magdalena and Princess Wilhelmina Caroline, and the family was joined by another daughter, Princess Louise in 1750. In 1751, almost three years after Christian's birth, his mother, Queen Louise, died during her sixth pregnancy, aged just 27 years. The following year, his father married Duchess Juliana Maria of Brunswick-Wolfenbüttel, who gave birth to Christian's half-brother, Prince Frederick in 1753.

=== Childhood and education ===
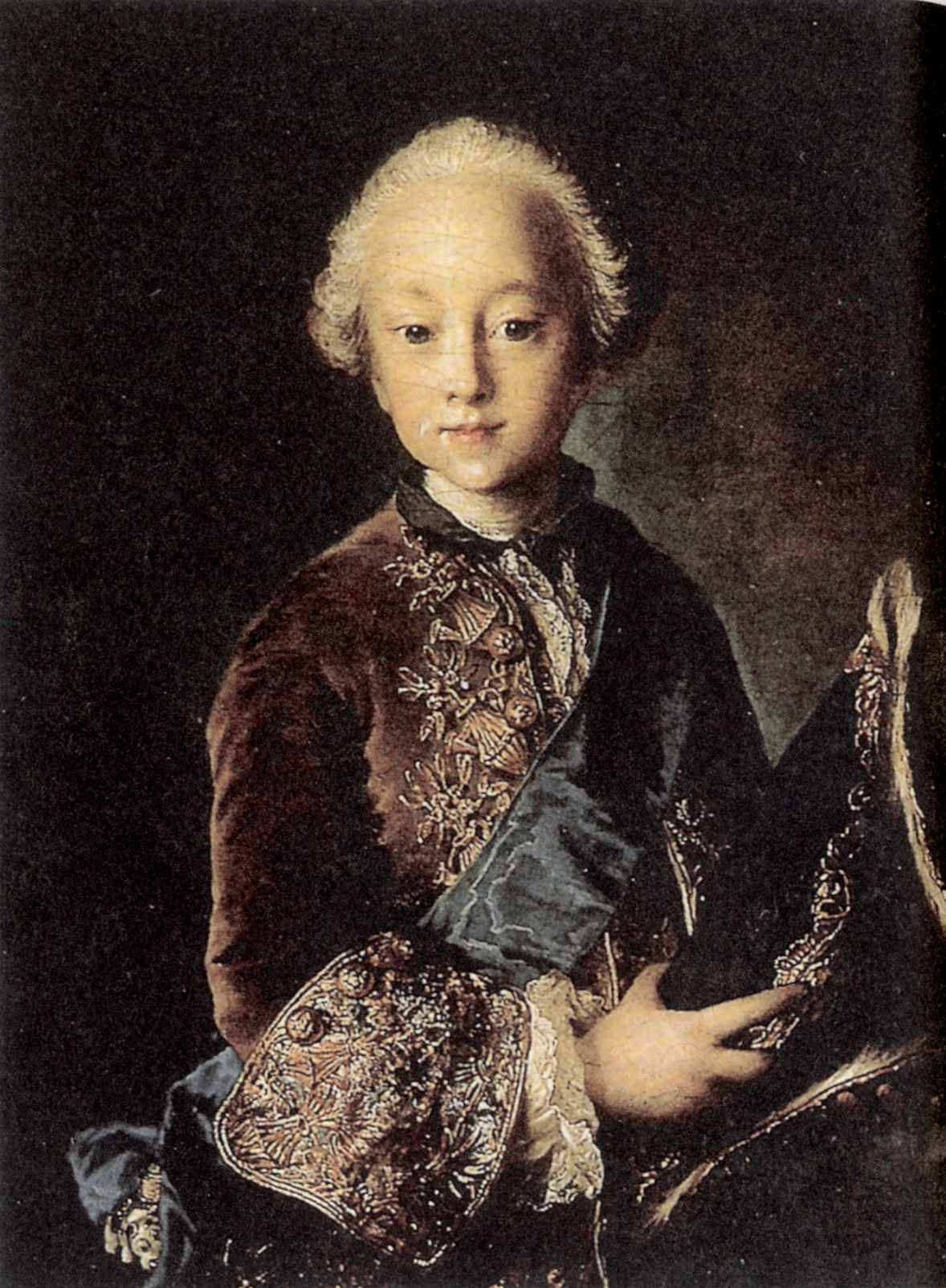
Christian as a boy

After his mother's early death, the prince was largely denied parental affection. His stepmother, Queen Juliane Marie, showed no interest in him, preferring her biological son, Hereditary Prince Frederick. Prone to debauchery and increasingly affected by alcoholism, Christian's father became increasingly indifferent to the shy, sensitive child, who was also prone to epileptic seizures. Nonetheless, early historians state that Christian had a delightful personality and considerable talent, but that he was poorly educated and systematically terrorized, and even flogged, by a brutal tutor, Count Christian Ditlev Frederik Reventlow. He seems to have been intelligent and had periods of clarity, but had severe emotional problems, possibly schizophrenia, as argued by Viggo Christiansen in Christian VII's mental illness (1906). He masturbated frequently, which worried his court physicians and tutors, who thought the practice reduced the prince's fertility and affected his learning capacity.

== Early reign ==
=== Accession ===
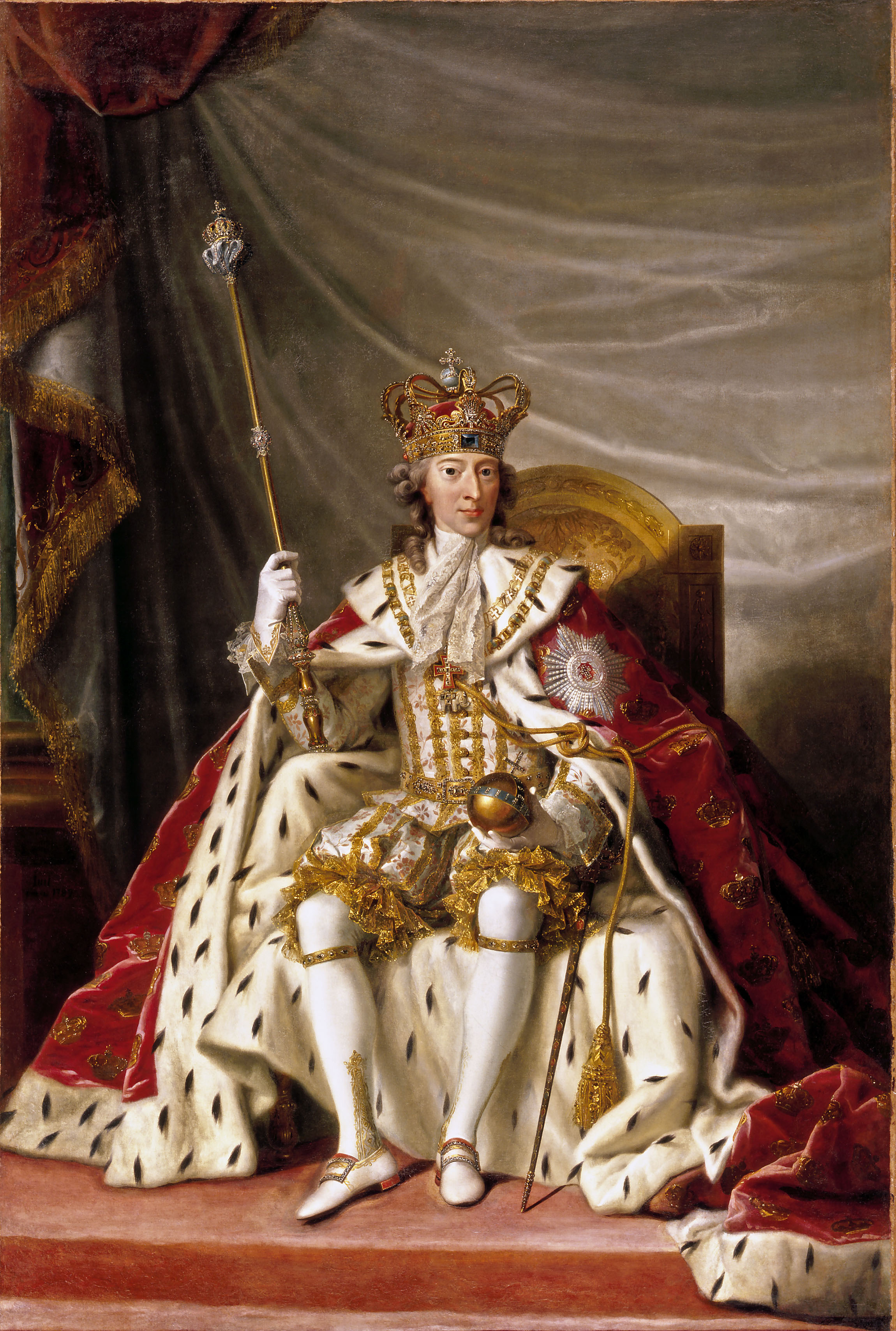
Coronation portrait of Christian VII by Jens Juel

After a long period of infirmity, Frederick V died on 14 January 1766, just 42 years old. At the death of his father, Christian immediately ascended the thrones of Denmark and Norway as their sixth absolute monarch, a few weeks before his 17th birthday. Later the same day, Christian was proclaimed king from the balcony of Christiansborg Palace. Christian's reign was marked by severe mental illness, which affected government decisions, and for most of his reign, Christian was only nominally king. His royal advisers changed depending on who won power struggles around the throne. Bored by the politics of being king, a few years after he acceded to the throne, Christian was given a 9-year-old slave boy called Moranti, with whom he could play games. The two would eventually become friends, and the king would spend much of his time with the young boy.

=== Marriage ===
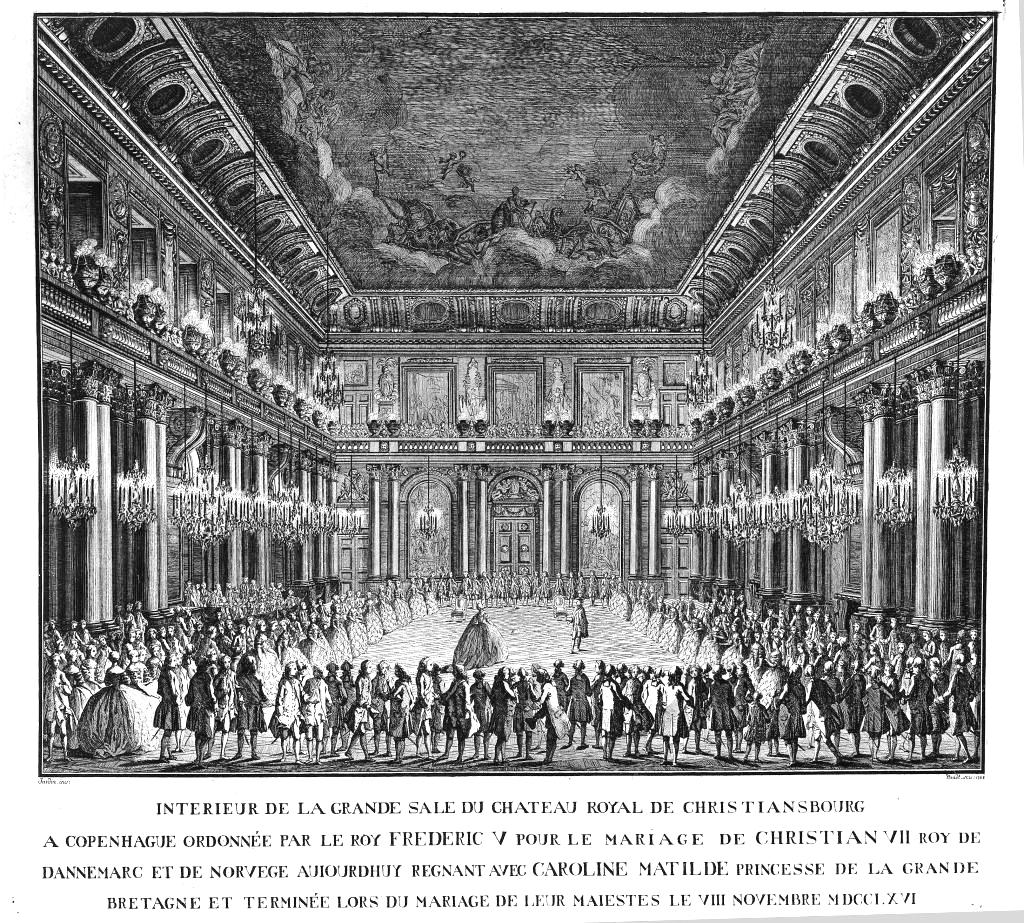
Christian VII and Caroline Matilda dance at the wedding held at Christiansborg Palace, the image has inscriptions in French

Later the same year, the young king married his first cousin, the 15-year-old Princess Caroline Matilda of Great Britain, in a dynastic marriage. They had been betrothed already in 1765. Her brother, King George III of Great Britain, was anxious about the marriage but not aware that the bridegroom had a mental illness. They were married in a proxy wedding ceremony on 1 October 1766 in the Chapel Royal of St James's Palace in London, with the Princess's brother, Prince Edward, Duke of York and Albany, acting as the representative of the groom. After her arrival in Copenhagen, another wedding ceremony took place on 8 November 1766 in the royal chapel at Christiansborg Palace. Marriage celebrations and balls lasted for another month. On 1 May 1767, Christian VII and Caroline Matilda were crowned King and Queen of Denmark and Norway in the royal chapel of Christiansborg Palace.

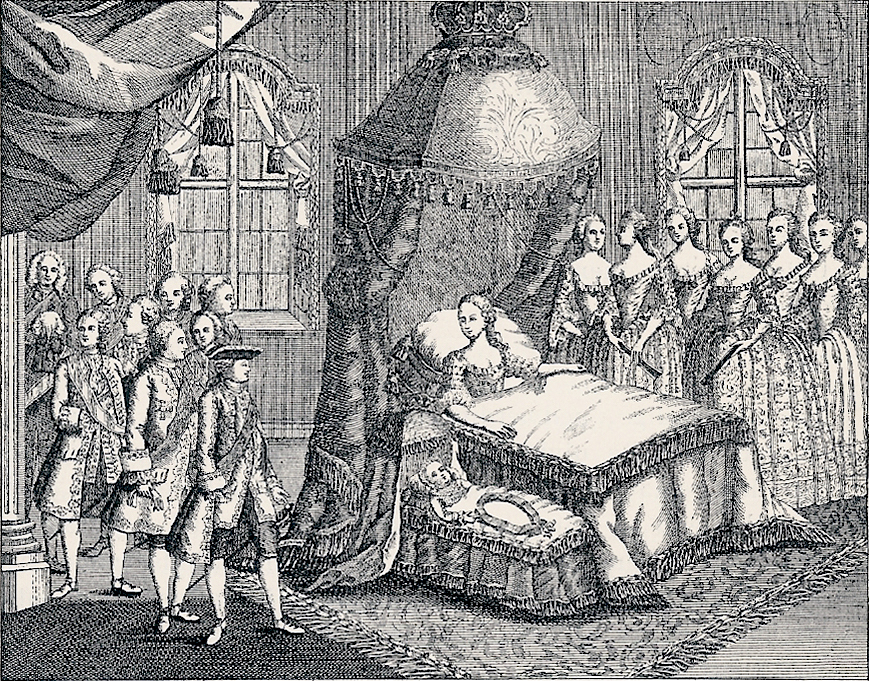
The King visiting the newborn Crown Prince Frederick and the Queen Caroline Matilda after the birth.

The marriage was unhappy, and after his marriage, the king abandoned himself to the worst excesses, especially sexual promiscuity. In 1767, he entered into a relationship with the courtesan Støvlet-Cathrine. He ultimately sank into a condition of mental stupor. Symptoms during this time included paranoia, self-mutilation, and hallucinations. The king showed little interest in the queen and only reluctantly visited her in her chambers. His trusted Swiss tutor, Élie Salomon François Reverdil, had to step in, among other things, by writing love letters in the king's name, in an attempt to make the marriage result in a pregnancy and thus an heir to the throne. On 28 January 1768, Queen Caroline Mathilde gave birth at Christiansborg Palace to the royal couple's son and heir to the throne, the future King Frederick VI.

=== Struensee ===
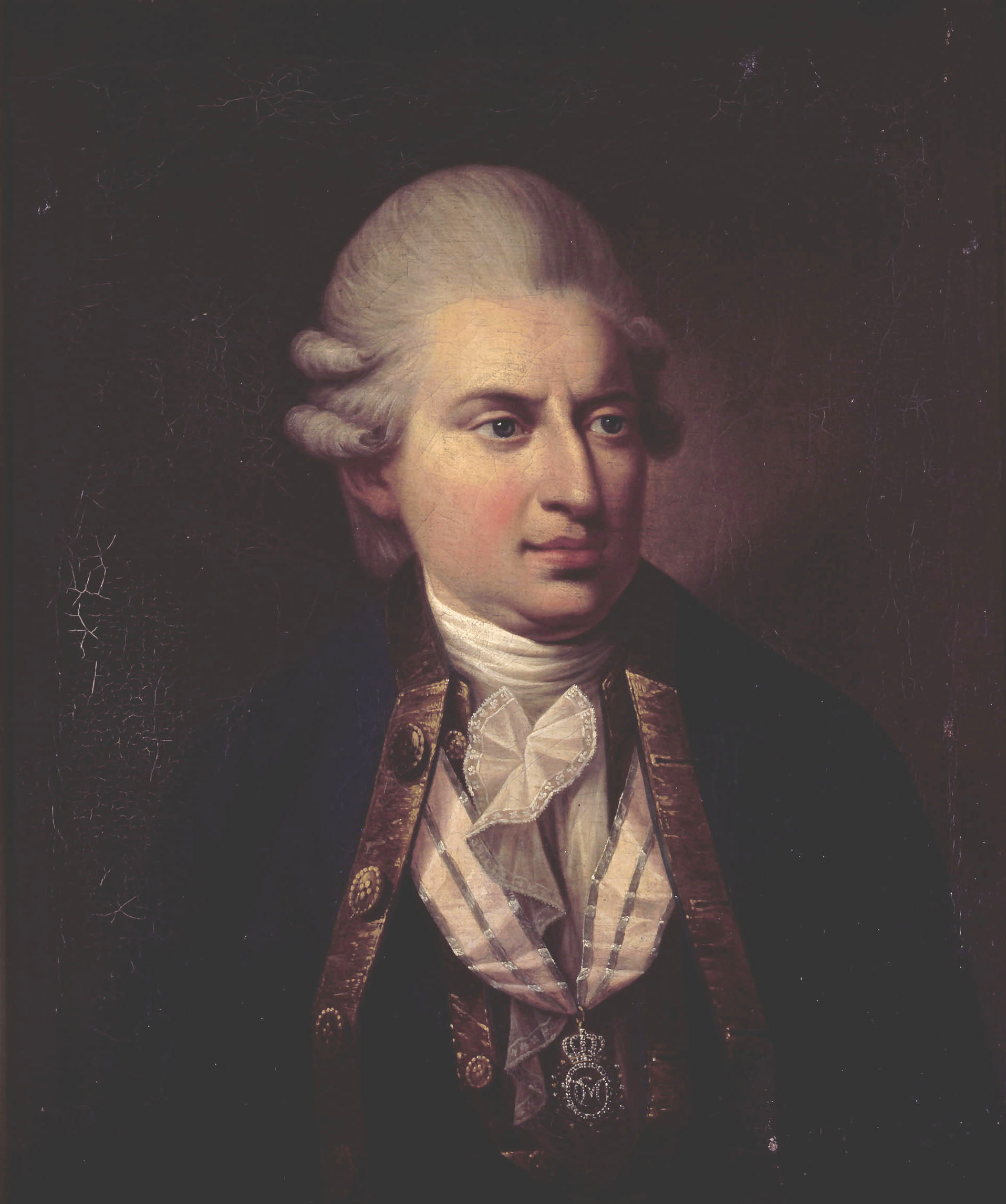
Posthumous portrait of Johann Friedrich Struensee by Jens Juel.

The progressive and radical thinker Johann Friedrich Struensee, Christian's personal physician, became his advisor and steadily rose in power in the late 1760s to become the country's de facto regent, introducing widespread progressive reforms. Struensee was a protégé of an Enlightenment circle of aristocrats that had been rejected by the court in Copenhagen. He was a skilled physician, and having somewhat restored the king's health while visiting the Schleswig-Holstein area, he gained the king's affection. He was retained as travelling physician (Livmedikus hos Kong Christian VII) on 5 April 1768, and accompanied the entourage on the king's foreign tour to Paris and London via Hannover from 6 May 1768 to 12 January 1769. He was given the title of State Councilor (etatsråd) on 12 May 1768, barely a week after leaving Altona. The neglected and lonely Caroline Matilda entered into an affair with Struensee.

From 1770 to 1772, Struensee was de facto regent of the country and introduced progressive reforms that were signed into law by Christian VII. Struensee was deposed by a coup in 1772 after which the country was ruled by Christian's stepmother, Juliane Marie of Brunswick-Wolfenbüttel, his half-brother Frederick, and the Danish politician Ove Høegh-Guldberg.

=== Divorce ===
The king divorced Caroline Matilda in 1772 after they had produced two children: the future King Frederick VI and Princess Louise Auguste (the latter is believed to be the daughter of Struensee). Struensee, who had enacted many modernising and emancipating reforms, was arrested and executed the same year. Christian signed Struensee's arrest and execution warrant under pressure from his stepmother, Queen Juliana Maria, who had led the movement to have the marriage ended. Caroline Matilda retained her title but not her children. She eventually left Denmark and passed her remaining days in exile at Celle Castle in her brother's German territory, the Electorate of Hanover. She died there of scarlet fever on 10 May 1775 at the age of 23.

== Later life ==
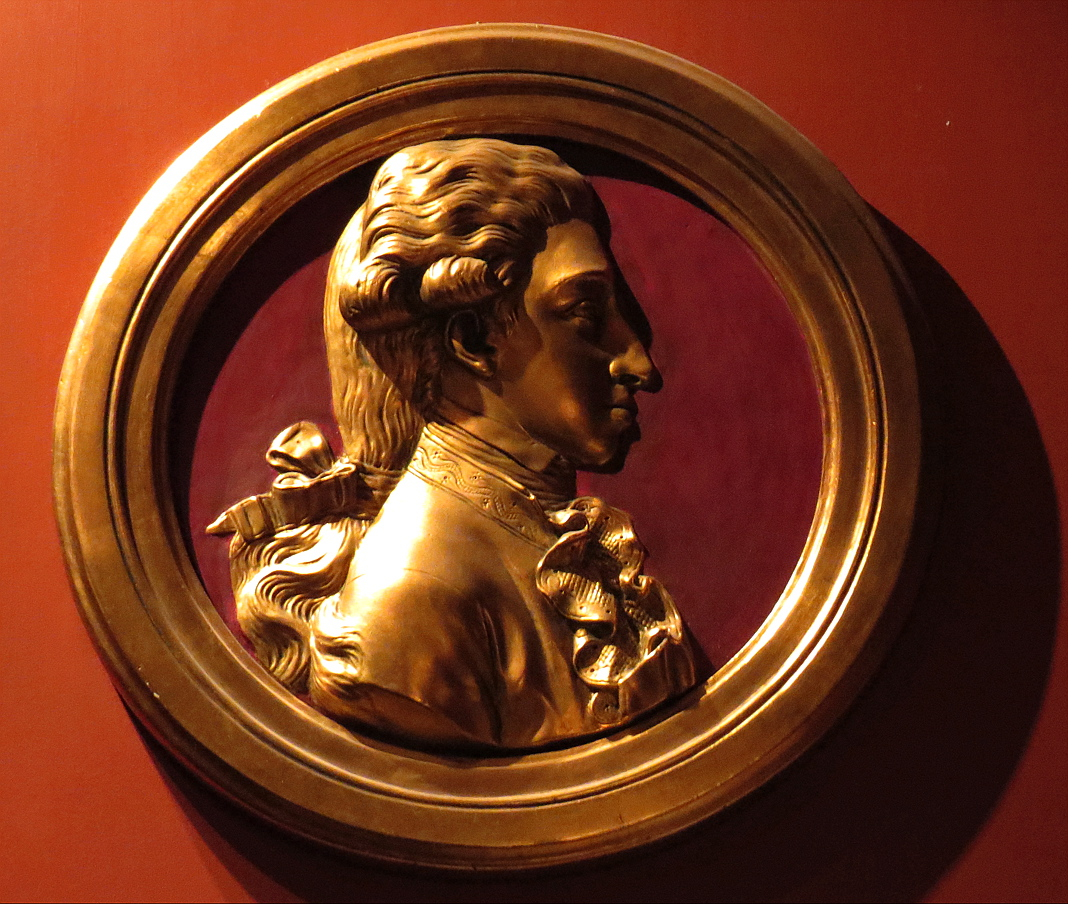
Profile relief by Nicolai Dajon (1748–1823)

Christian was only nominally king from 1772 onward. Between 1772 and 1784, Denmark-Norway was ruled by his stepmother, the Queen Dowager Juliane Marie, his half-brother Frederick, and the Danish politician Ove Høegh-Guldberg. From 1784, his son Frederick ruled permanently as prince regent. This regency was marked by liberal, judicial, and agricultural reforms, but also by disasters of the Theatre War, French Revolutionary Wars, the beginning of the Napoleonic Wars, and the rise of the Norwegian separatist movement.

=== Death and succession ===
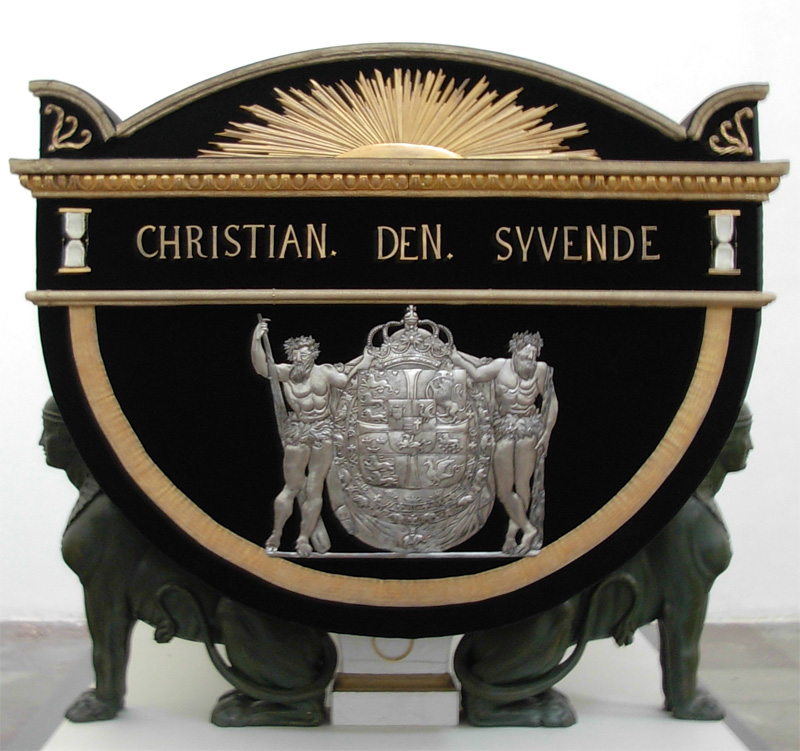
Christian VII's sarcophagus in Frederick V's Chapel at Roskilde Cathedral

Christian died at age 59 of a stroke on 13 March 1808 in Rendsburg, Schleswig. Although there were rumours that the stroke was caused by fright at the sight of Spanish auxiliary troops which he took to be hostile, Ulrik Langen, in his biography of the king, did not indicate that there was any external cause. He was buried in Roskilde Cathedral and was succeeded by his son Frederick VI.

== Legacy ==
=== Contribution to science ===
In 1769, King Christian VII invited the Hungarian astronomer Miksa Hell (Maximilian Hell) to Vardø. Hell observed the transit of Venus, and his calculations gave the most precise calculation of the Earth–Sun distance to that date (approx. 151 million kilometres). Hell's companion János Sajnovics explored the affinity among the languages of the Sami, Finnish, and Hungarian peoples (all members of the Finno-Ugric language family).

== Cultural depictions ==
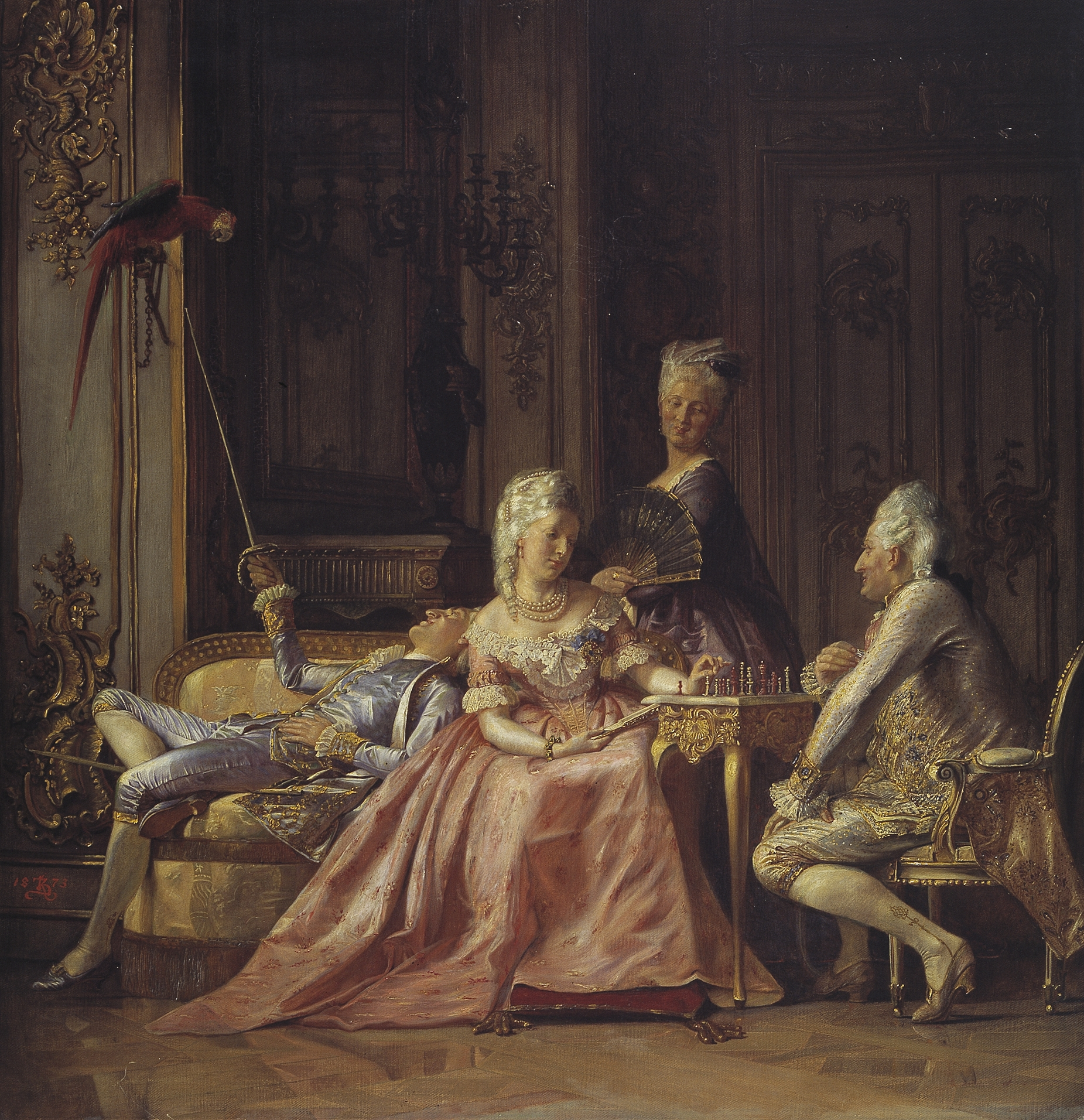
Kristian Zahrtmann: Scene from the court of Christian VII. History painting from 1873 at the Hirschsprung Collection.

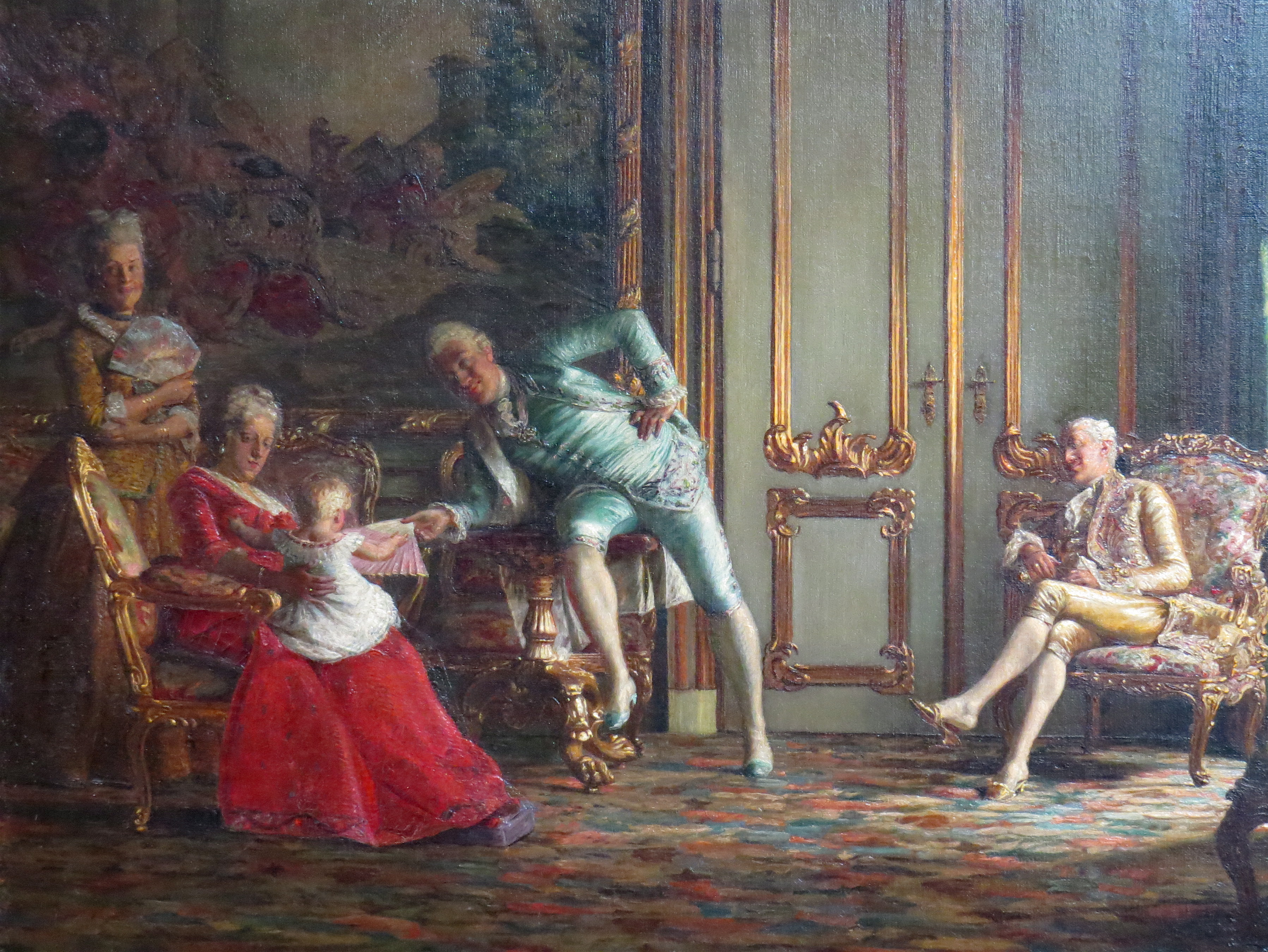
Kristian Zahrtmann: Interior from the court of Christian VII. History painting from 1881 at the Hirschsprung Collection.

Christian VII, the story of his marriage, and his wife's affair with Struensee have featured in many artistic works:

=== Literature ===
- 1935 : Die Gefangene von Celle – a 1935 novel by Else von Hollander-Lossow
- 1935 : The Favourite of the Queen (German: Struensee: Doktor, Diktator, Favorit und armer Sünder; later Der Favorit der Königin) – a 1935 novel by Robert Neumann
- 1948 : The Queen's Physician – a 1948 novel by Edgar Maass
- 1953 : Converse at Night in Copenhagen (Danish: Samtale om natten i København) – a 1953 novel by Karen Blixen
- 1955 : Caroline Matilda, princess of Great Britain and queen of Denmark – a 1955 novel by Geoffrey Vaughan Blackstone
- 1969 : The Lost Queen – a 1969 novel by Norah Lofts
- 1985 : Letter from Celle – a 1985 dramatic poem by Edward Lowbury
- 1999 : The Visit of the Royal Physician (Swedish: Livläkarens besök) – a 1999 novel by Per Olov Enquist
- 2000 : Prinsesse af Blodet – en roman om Caroline Mathilde – a 2000 novel by Bodil Steensen-Leth
- 2015 : There's a mad king in Denmark (Italian: C'è un re pazzo in Danimarca) – a 2015 biographical novel by Dario Fo
- 2021 : Sigurverkið – a 2021 novel by Arnaldur Indriðason

=== Stage ===
- 1827 : Struensee – an 1827 drama by Michael Beer with stage music by his brother Giacomo Meyerbeer (Stuttgart and Tübingen: Cotta 1829, premiered in Munich in 1828). The play was originally forbidden under the rule of the Prussian King Frederick William III, and finally allowed by his more liberal successor Frederick William IV and premiered in Berlin in 1856.
- 1991 : Caroline Mathilde – a 1991 two-act ballet staged by the Royal Danish Ballet and choreographed by Flemming Flindt to music by Sir Peter Maxwell Davies.
- 2008 : The Visit of the Royal Physician (Danish: Livlægens besøg) – a 2008 opera staged by the Royal Danish Opera and composed by Bo Holten to a libretto based on Enquist's 1999 novel.

=== Film ===
- 1923 : The Love of a Queen (German: Die Liebe einer Königin) – a 1923 German historical drama silent film directed by Ludwig Wolff, in which Christian VII is played by Walter Janssen.
- 1935 : The Dictator – a 1935 British film directed by Victor Saville, in which Christian VII was played by Emlyn Williams. The film depicts his relationship with Caroline Mathilde, who is played by Madeleine Carroll.
- 1957 : King in Shadow (German: Herrscher ohne Krone) – a 1957 West German feature film based on Neumann's 1935 novel, and directed by Harald Braun, in which Christian VII was played by Horst Buchholz.
- Caroline – den sidste rejse – a 2010 Danish film
- 2012 : A Royal Affair (Danish: En kongelig affære) – an Academy Award-nominated Danish historical drama film directed by Nikolaj Arcel, in which Christian VII is played by Mikkel Boe Følsgaard.

== Ancestry ==
Ancestors of Christian VII

8. Frederick IV of Denmark
4. Christian VI of Denmark
9. Louise of Mecklenburg-Güstrow
2. Frederick V of Denmark
10. Christian Heinrich, Margrave of Brandenburg-Kulmbach
5. Sophie Magdalene of Brandenburg-Kulmbach
11. Sophie Christiane of Wolfstein
1. Christian VII of Denmark
12. George I of Great Britain
6. George II of Great Britain
13. Sophia Dorothea of Celle
3. Louise of Great Britain
14. John Frederick, Margrave of Brandenburg-Ansbach
7. Caroline of Ansbach
15. Eleonore Erdmuthe of Saxe-Eisenach

Christian VII House of Oldenburg Born: 29 January 1749 Died: 13 March 1808
Regnal titles
Preceded by Frederick V	Count of Oldenburg; 1766–1773	Succeeded by Paul
Preceded by Frederick V	King of Denmark and Norway; Duke of Schleswig; 1766–1808	Succeeded by Frederick VI
Preceded by Frederick V and Paul	Duke of Holstein; 1766–1808 with Paul (1766–1773)	Succeeded by Frederick VI
