= Johann Friedrich Struensee =

Danish physician, philosopher and statesman (1737–1772)

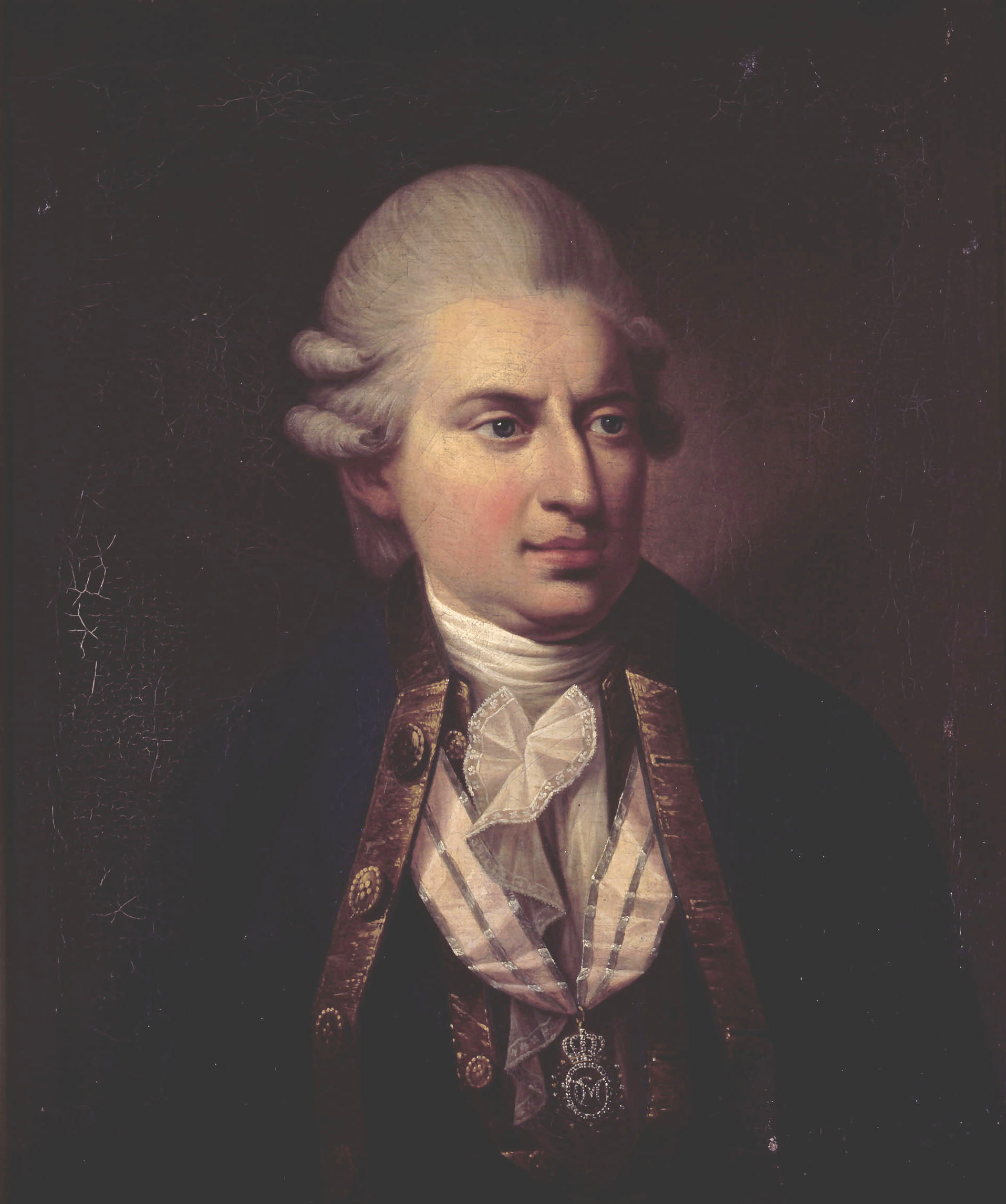
- Portrait by Hans Hansen, 1824

Privy Councillor of Denmark
- Predecessor: Johann Hartwig Ernst von Bernstorff
- Successor: Ove Høegh-Guldberg
- Born: 5 August 1737; Halle an der Saale, Kingdom of Prussia
- Died: 28 April 1772 (aged 34); Copenhagen, Kingdom of Denmark-Norway
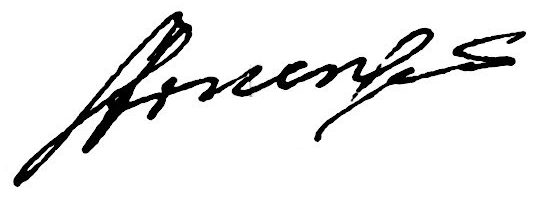
- Signature
- Occupation: Physician

Lensgreve Johann Friedrich Struensee (5 August 1737 – 28 April 1772) was a German-Danish physician, philosopher and statesman. He became royal physician to the mentally ill King Christian VII of Denmark-Norway and a minister in the Danish government. He rose in power to a position of de facto regent of the country, and he initiated a number of widespread reforms. His affair with Queen Caroline Matilda ("Caroline Mathilde") caused a scandal, especially after the birth of a daughter, Princess Louise Augusta, and he contributed to the intrigues and power play that led to his downfall and execution.

== Upbringing and early career ==
Born at Halle an der Saale and baptized at St. Moritz on 7 August 1737, Struensee was the third child of six born to Pietist theologian and minister Adam Struensee (baptized in Neuruppin on 8 September 1708 – Rendsburg, 20 June 1791) and his wife Maria Dorothea Carl (Berleburg, 31 July 1716 – Schleswig, 31 December 1792). The elder Struensee attended the University of Halle and served in a number of pastoral postings before being appointed Royal General Superintendent of Schleswig and Holstein between 1760 and 1791. The Struensees were a respectable middle-class family that believed in religious tolerance. Three of the Struensee sons went to University, but none became theologians like their father; two of the daughters married ministers.

Johann Friedrich entered the University of Halle on 5 August 1752 at the age of fifteen where he studied medicine, and graduated as a Doctor in Medicine ("Dr. Med.") on 12 December 1757. The university exposed him to Age of Enlightenment ideals, and social and political critique and reform. He supported these new ideas, becoming a proponent of atheism, the writings of Claude Adrien Helvétius, and other French materialists.

When Adam and Maria Dorothea Struensee moved to Altona in 1758, where the elder Struensee became pastor of Trinitatiskirche (Trinity's Church), Johann Friedrich moved with them. He was soon employed as a public doctor in Altona, in the estate of Count Rantzau, and in the Pinneberg District. His wages were meager and he expected to supplement them with private practice.

His parents moved to Rendsburg in 1760 where Adam Struensee became first superintendent (comparable to bishop) for the duchy, and subsequently superintendent-general of Schleswig-Holstein. Struensee, now 23 years old, had to set up his own household for the first time. His lifestyle expectations were not matched by his economics. His abilities and manner led to his acceptance in elite social circles and he entertained his contemporaries with his controversial opinions.

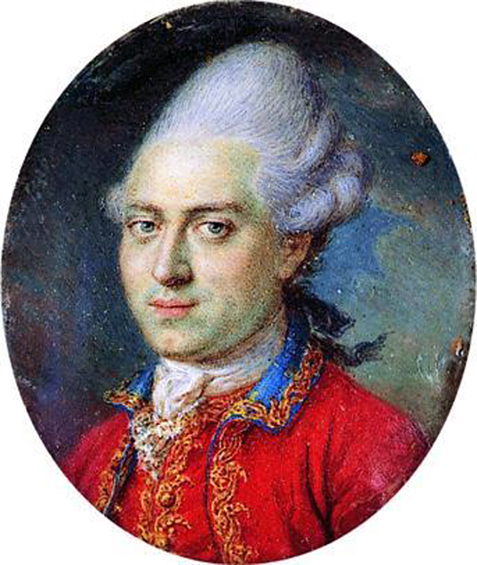
Portrait of Struensee, 1770

Struensee was ambitious and petitioned the Danish government through Minister of Foreign Affairs Count Johann Hartwig Ernst von Bernstorff for funds. He wrote Enlightenment treatises and published many of them in his journal Zum Nutzen und Vergnügen ("For benefit and enjoyment").

== Physician to King Christian VII ==
During Struensee's near ten-year residence in Altona he came into contact with a circle of aristocrats who had been sent away from the royal court in Copenhagen. Among them were Enevold Brandt and Count Schack Carl Rantzau, who were supporters of the Enlightenment. Rantzau recommended Struensee to the court as a physician to attend King Christian VII on his forthcoming tour to princely and royal courts in western Germany, the Netherlands, England, and France.

Struensee received the appointment in April 1768. The king and his entourage set forth on 6 May. While in England Struensee received the honorary degree of Doctor in Medicine from the University of Cambridge.

During the eight-month tour, he gained the king's confidence and favor. The king's ministers, Bernstorff and Finance Minister H. C. Schimmelmann, were pleased with Struensee's influence on the king, who began displaying fewer publicly disruptive behaviors. Upon the court's return to Copenhagen in January 1769, Struensee was appointed personal physician to the king. In May, he was given the honorary title of State Councillor, which advanced him to the class of the third rank at court. Struensee wrote an important report on the mental health of the King.

== Rise to power ==
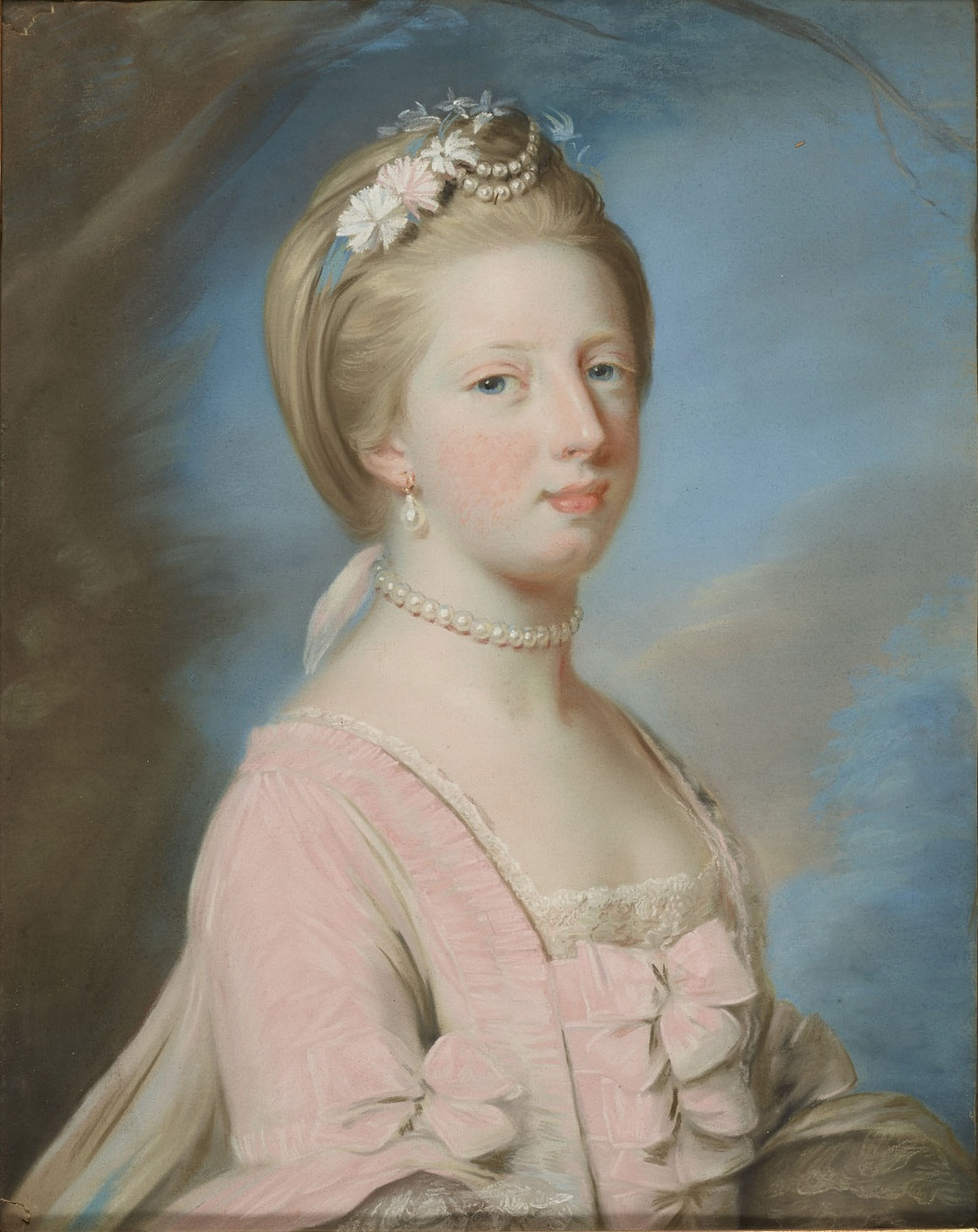
Queen Caroline Mathilda

First he reconciled the king and queen. At first Caroline Matilda disliked Struensee, but she was unhappy in her marriage, neglected and spurned by the king, and affected by his illness. However, Struensee was one of the few people who paid attention to the lonely queen, and he attempted to support her. Over time her affection for the young doctor grew and by spring 1770 he became her lover; a successful vaccination of the baby crown prince in May still further increased his influence.

Struensee was very involved with the upbringing of Crown Prince Frederick along the principles of Enlightenment, such as outlined by Jean-Jacques Rousseau's challenge to return to nature. However, he had his own interpretation of Rousseau's ideas and preferred isolating the child and encouraging him to manage things largely on his own. He also took Rousseau's advice about cold being beneficial for children literally, and the Crown Prince was thus only sparsely clothed even during wintertime.

== In control of the government ==
The Kingdom of Denmark–Norway

Struensee was named royal adviser (forelæser) and konferensråd on 5 May 1770. As in the course of the year the king sank into a condition of mental torpor, Struensee's authority became paramount. On 15 September the 16-month period generally referred to as the "Time of Struensee" began.

At first, Struensee kept a low profile as he began to control the political machine. However, as the royal court and government spent the summer of 1770 in Schleswig-Holstein (Gottorp, Traventhal, and Ascheberg) his political influence increased. In December 1770, he subsequently took more direct control and on the 10th of that month, he abolished the council of state. A week later, he appointed himself maître des requêtes. It became his official duty to present reports from the various departments of state to the king. Because King Christian was scarcely responsible for his actions, Struensee dictated whatever answers he pleased. Next, he dismissed all department heads, and abolished the Norwegian viceroyship. Henceforth, the cabinet with himself as its central authority became the one supreme authority in the state. Struensee exercised extensive authority for almost thirteen months, between 18 December 1770 and 16 January 1772. During that time, he issued no fewer than 1,069 cabinet orders, or more than three a day.

Reforms initiated by Struensee included:

- abolition of torture
- abolition of unfree labor (corvée)
- abolition of the censorship of the press
- abolition of the practice of preferring nobles for state offices
- abolition of noble privileges
- abolition of "undeserved" revenues for nobles
- abolition of the etiquette rules at the Royal Court
- abolition of the Royal Court's aristocracy
- abolition of state funding of unproductive manufacturers
- abolition of several holidays
- introduction of a tax on gambling and luxury horses to fund nursing of foundlings
- ban of slave trade in the Danish colonies
- rewarding only actual achievements with feudal titles and decorations
- criminalization and punishment of bribery
- re-organization of the judicial institutions to minimize corruption
- introduction of state-owned grain storages to balance out the grain price
- assignment of farmland to peasants
- re-organization and reduction of the army
- university reforms
- reform of the state-owned medical institutions

Other reforms included the abolition of capital punishment for theft; the doing away with such demoralizing abuses as perquisites; and of "lackey-ism", the appointment of powerful men's domestic staff to lucrative public posts.

Critics of Struensee thought that he did not respect native Danish and Norwegian customs, saw them as prejudices and wanted to eliminate them in favour of abstract principles. He also did not speak Danish and conducted his business in German. To ensure obedience, he dismissed entire staffs of public departments, without pensions or compensation, and substituted with nominees of his own. The new officials were in many cases inexperienced men who knew little or nothing of the country that they were supposed to govern.

Initially, the Danish people favored his reforms, but they began to turn against him. When Struensee abolished all censorship of the press, it mostly resulted in a flood of anti-Struensee pamphlets.

During the initial months of his rule, middle-class opinion was in his favour. A major source of public opposition was the way in which he put the king completely on one side, and the feeling was all the stronger as, outside a very narrow court circle, few people appear to have believed that Christian VII was mentally ill, but only that his will had been weakened by habitual ill usage. That opinion was confirmed by the publication of the cabinet order of 14 July 1771, which appointed Struensee "gehejme kabinetsminister" or "Geheimekabinetsminister", with authority to issue cabinet orders which were to have the force of royal ordinances, even if unprovided with the royal sign manual.

Struensee's relations with the queen were offensive to a nation which had a traditional veneration for the royal House of Oldenburg, and Caroline Matilda's conduct in public scandalized the populace. The society which daily gathered round the king and queen excited the derision of the foreign ambassadors. The king had limited effective authority and was subject to influence by those around him, but occasionally, the king would put up a show of obstinacy and refuse to carry out Brandt's or Struensee's orders. Once, when he threatened his keeper, Brandt, with a flogging for some impertinence, Brandt ended up in a struggle with the King and he struck the King in the face.

== Arrest and execution ==
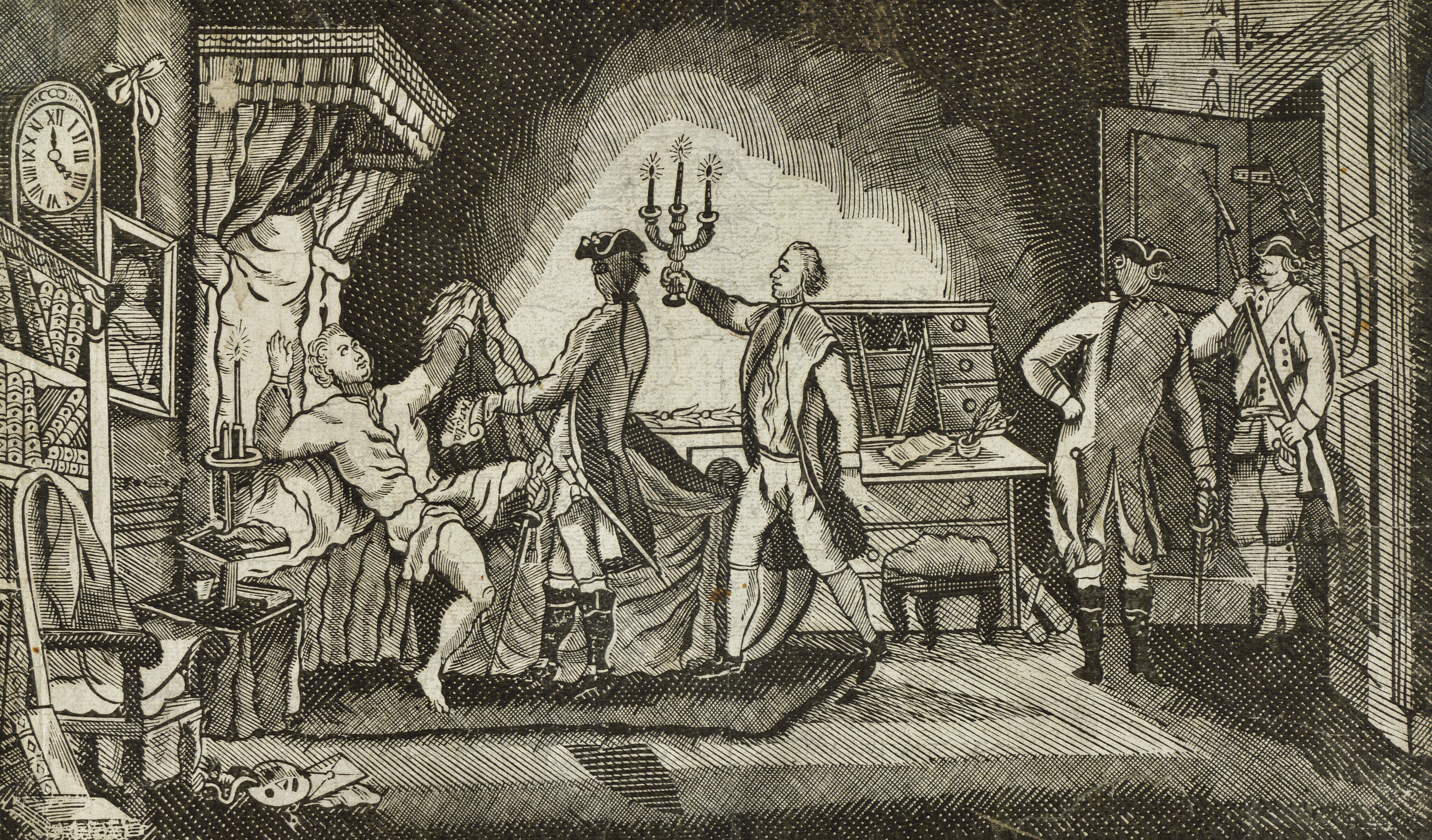
Contemporary woodcarving of Struensee's arrest

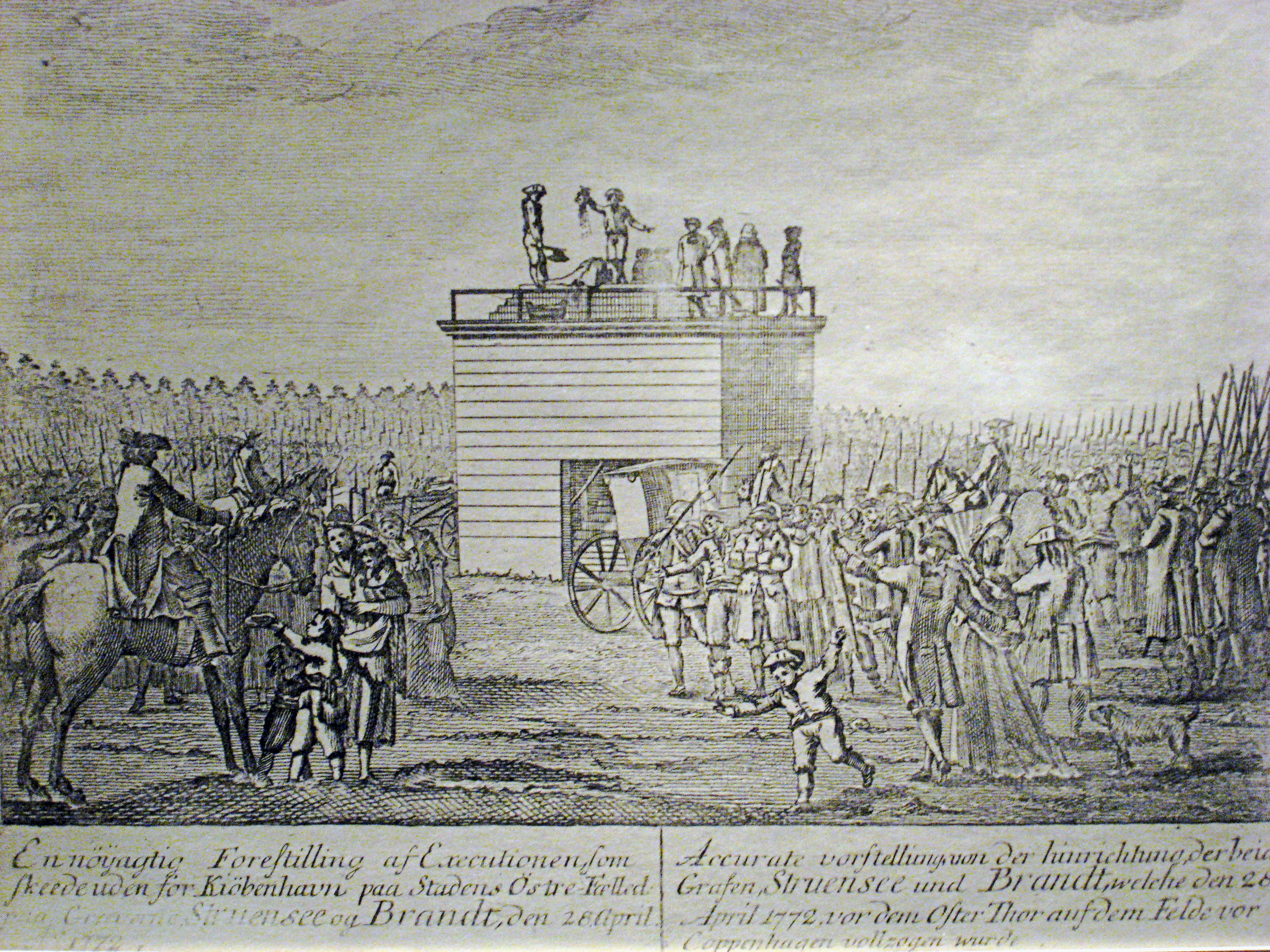
Public execution of Struensee on 28 April 1772

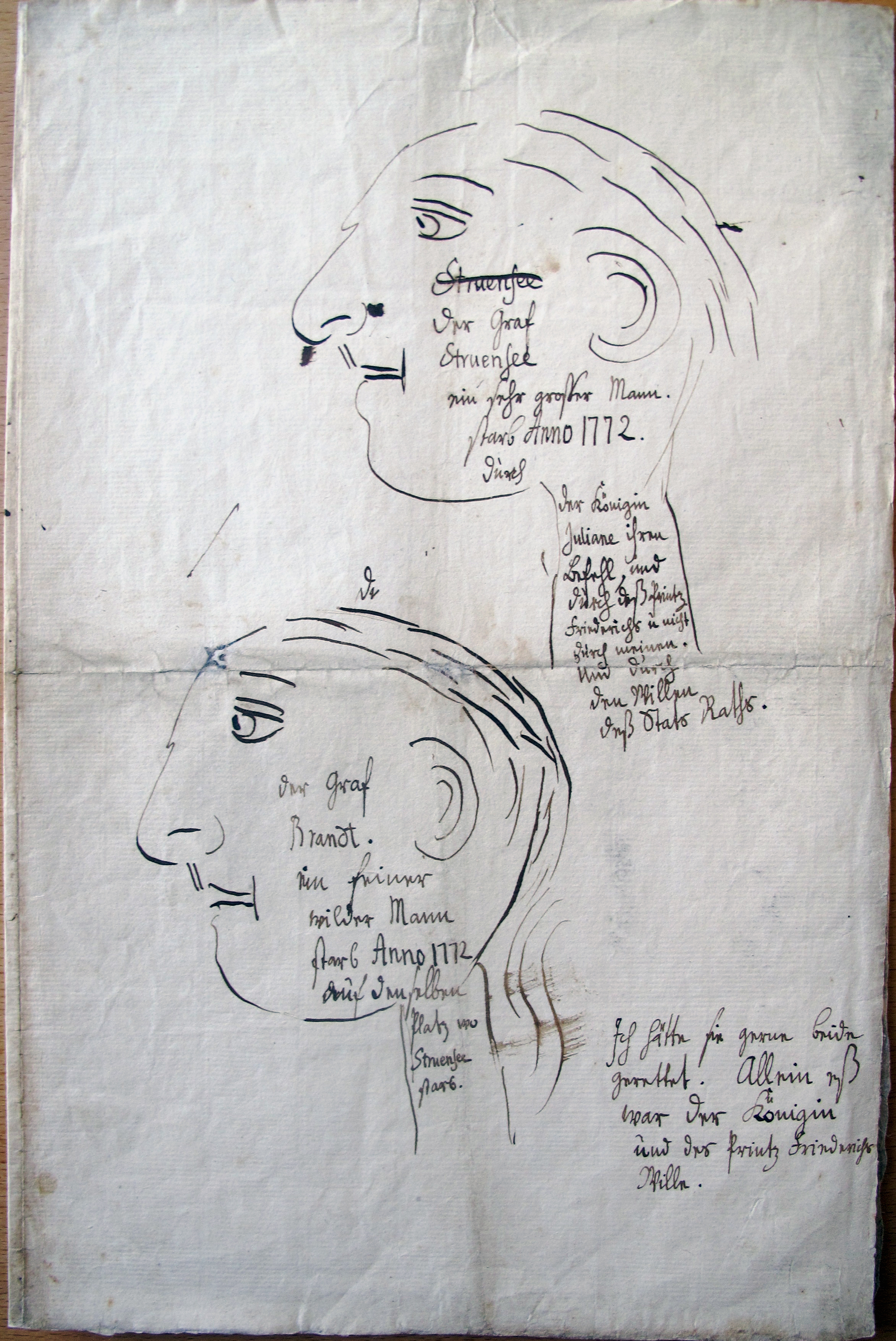
Drawing of Struensee and Brandt by Christian VII

Struensee's dismissal of many government officials and officers brought him numerous political enemies. On 30 November 1771, he declared himself and Brandt counts. Those actions stirred feelings of unease and dissatisfaction in the populace of Denmark and Norway.

Christian VII along with his queen, Struensee, Brandt, and members of the royal court, spent the summer of 1771 at Hirschholm Palace north of Copenhagen. They stayed there until late in the autumn. On 7 July, the queen gave birth to a daughter, Louise Augusta, widely believed then and by historians to be the daughter of Struensee. The court moved to Frederiksberg Palace just west of Copenhagen on 19 November.

The general ill will against Struensee, which had been smouldering all through the autumn of 1771, found expression in a conspiracy against him, headed by Schack Carl Rantzau and others, in the name of the Queen Dowager Juliana Maria, to wrest power away from the king, and secure her and her son's positions of power.

The court returned to Christiansborg Palace on 8 January 1772. The season's first masquerade ball was held at the Court Theatre on 16 January.

A palace coup took place in the early morning of 17 January 1772, Struensee, Brandt and Queen Caroline Matilda were arrested in their respective bedrooms, and the perceived liberation of the king, who was driven round Copenhagen by his deliverers in a gold carriage, was received with universal rejoicing. The chief charge against Struensee was that he had usurped the royal authority in contravention of the Royal Law (Kongelov). He defended himself with considerable ability and, at first, confident that the prosecution would not dare to lay hands on the queen, he denied that their liaison had ever been criminal. The queen was taken as prisoner of state to Kronborg Castle.

On 27 April/28 April, Struensee and Brandt were condemned first to lose their right hands and then to be beheaded. Their bodies were afterwards to be drawn and quartered. The Kongelov had no provisions for a mentally-ill ruler who was unfit to govern. However, as a commoner who had imposed himself in the circles of nobility, Struensee was condemned as being guilty of lèse majesté and usurpation of the royal authority, both of which were capital offences according to paragraphs 2 and 26 of the Kongelov.

Struensee awaited his execution at Kastellet, Copenhagen. The sentences were carried out on 28 April 1772, with Brandt being executed first.

The king himself considered Struensee a great man, even after his death. Written in German on a drawing the king made in 1775, three years after Struensee's execution, was the following: Ich hätte gern beide gerettet ("I would have liked to have saved them both"), referring to Struensee and Brandt.

== Cultural depictions ==
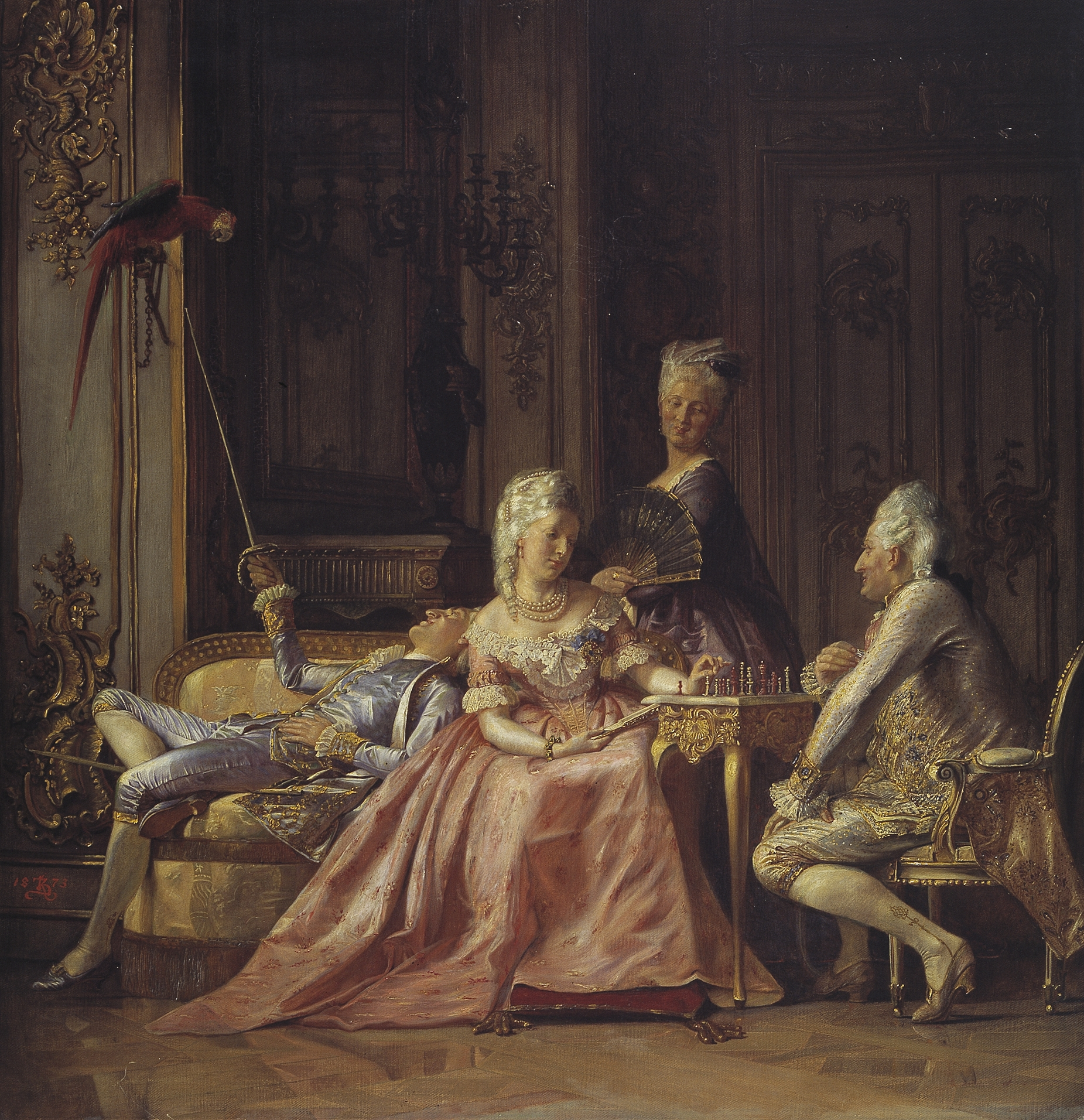
Kristian Zahrtmann: Scene from the court of Christian VII. History painting from 1873 at the Hirschsprung Collection.

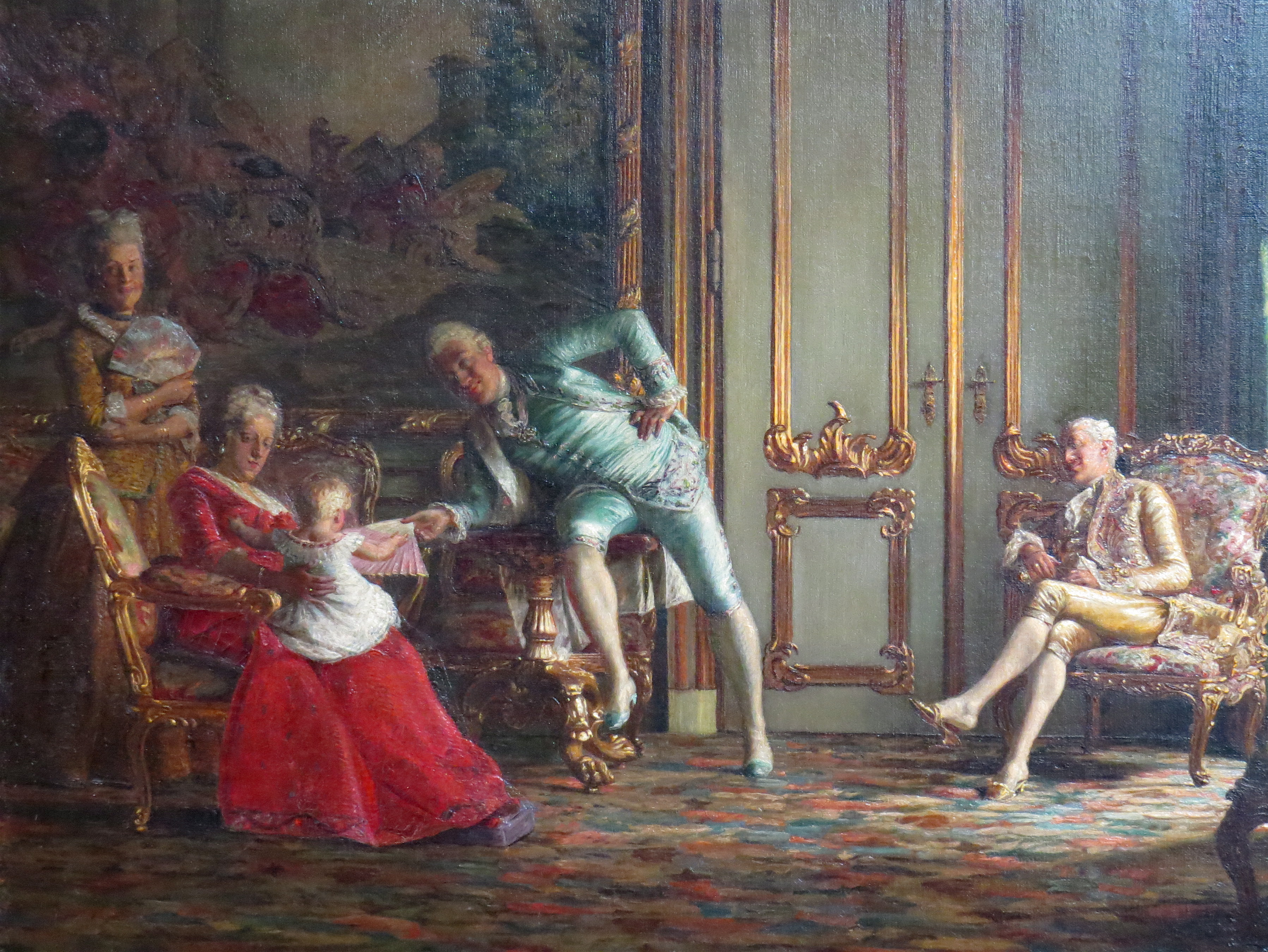
Kristian Zahrtmann: Interior from the court of Christian VII. History painting from 1881 at the Hirschsprung Collection.

Struensee, his affair with the queen and his relation with the king have been featured in many artistic works:

=== Literature ===
- 1773: A faithful narrative of the conversion and death of Count Struensee, late Prime Minister of Denmark (1773) by Balthasar Münter (translated Jørgen Hee)
- 1935: Die Gefangene von Celle – a 1935 novel by Else von Hollander-Lossow
- 1935: The Favourite of the Queen (German: Struensee: Doktor, Diktator, Favorit und armer Sünder; later Der Favorit der Königin) – a 1935 novel by Robert Neumann
- 1948: The Queen's Physician – a 1948 novel by Edgar Maass
- 1953: Converse at Night in Copenhagen (Danish: Samtale om natten i København) – a 1953 novel by Karen Blixen
- 1955: Caroline Matilda, princess of Great Britain and queen of Denmark – a 1955 novel by Geoffrey Vaughan Blackstone
- 1969: The Lost Queen – a 1969 historical novel by Norah Lofts
- 1985: Letter from Celle – a 1985 dramatic poem by Edward Lowbury
- 1999: The Visit of the Royal Physician (Swedish: Livläkarens besök) – a 1999 novel by Per Olov Enquist
- 2000: Prinsesse af Blodet - en roman om Caroline Mathilde – a 2000 novel by Bodil Steensen-Leth
- 2015: There's a mad king in Denmark (Italian: C'è un re pazzo in Danimarca) – a 2015 biographical novel by Dario Fo

=== Stage ===
- 1827: Struensee – an 1827 drama by Michael Beer with stage music by his brother Giacomo Meyerbeer (Stuttgart and Tübingen: Cotta 1829, premiered in Munich in 1828). The play was originally forbidden under the rule of the Prussian King Frederick William III, and finally allowed by his more liberal successor Frederick William IV and premiered in Berlin in 1856.
- 1991: Caroline Mathilde – a 1991 two-act ballet staged by the Royal Danish Ballet and choreographed by Flemming Flindt to music by Sir Peter Maxwell Davies.
- 2008: The Visit of the Royal Physician (Danish: Livlægens besøg) – a 2008 opera staged by the Royal Danish Opera and composed by Bo Holten to a libretto based on Enquist's 1999 novel.
- 2023: Struensee of the Shore (Japanese: 海辺のストルーエンセ, romanized: Umibe no Struensee) - a 2023 musical staged by the Takarazuka Revue.

=== Film ===
- 1923: The Love of a Queen (German: Die Liebe einer Königin) – a 1923 German historical drama silent film directed by Ludwig Wolff, in which Struensee is played by Harry Liedtke.
- 1935: The Dictator – a 1935 British film directed by Victor Saville, in which Struensee was played by the English actor Clive Brook. The film depicts his relationship with Caroline Mathilde, who is played by Madeleine Carroll.
- 1957: King in Shadow (German: Herrscher ohne Krone) – a 1957 West German feature film directed by Harald Braun, and based on Neumann's 1935 novel, in which Struensee was portrayed by O.W. Fischer.
- 2012: A Royal Affair (Danish: En kongelig affære) – an Academy Award-nominated Danish historical drama film directed by Nikolaj Arcel, starring Mads Mikkelsen as Struensee.

=== Other ===
- Fragrance: Purple Fig by Vilhelm Parfumerie – A gourmand fragrance based on Struensee's last picnic the night before his execution.

== Sources ==
- Barton, H. Arnold. Scandinavia in the Revolutionary Era 1760–1815, University of Minnesota Press, 1986. ISBN 0-8166-1393-1.
- Commager, Henry Steele. "Struensee and the Enlightenment," The search for a usable past, and other essays in historiography (1967) pp 349+.
- Dewey, Donald (Spring 2013). "The Danish Rasputin". Scandinavian Review. 100 (1). Archived from the original on 14 December 2018 – via Questia.
- Tilliyard, Stella. A Royal Affair: George III and his Scandalous Siblings. Chatto & Windus, 2006. ISBN 978-0-7011-7306-7

=== In Danish, Swedish or German ===
- Ahnfelt, Arvid (1883). Från Europas hof, dess furstehus och aristokrati: skildringar hemtade i nya specialverk samt svenska och utländska arkiv [From Europe's royal courts, its princely houses and aristocracy: depictions taken from new special works as well as Swedish and foreign archives.] (in Swedish). Vol. 1. Stockholm: Oscar L. Lamms förlag. pp. 3–103.
- Amdisen, Asser (2002). Til nytte og fornøjelse : Johann Friedrich Struensee (1737-1772) [For benefit and pleasure : Johann Friedrich Struensee (1737-1772)] (in Danish). Copenhagen: Akademisk Forlag. ISBN 87-5-003730-7.
- Barz, Paul (1985). Doktor Struensee : Rebell von oben [Doctor Struensee: Rebel from above] (in German). Munich: Kabel Ernst Verlag. ISBN 3-8225-0001-1.
- Barz, Paul (1986). Doktor Struensee – rebel blandt hofsnoge (in Danish). Translated by Ib Christensen. Lynge: Bogans forlag. ISBN 87-7466-083-7..
- Feldbæk, Ole (1990). "Den lange fred" [The long peace]. In Olsen, Olaf (ed.). Gyldendal og Politikens Danmarkshistorie (in Danish). Vol. 9: 1700-1800. Copenhagen: Gyldendal og Politikens Forlag. ISBN 87-89068-11-4.
- (in Danish) Bech, Svend Cedergreen. Struensee og hans tid. 2nd ed. Viborg. Forlaget Cicero, 1989. ISBN 87-7714-038-9
- (in Danish) Lars Bisgaard, Claus Bjørn, Michael Bregnsbo, Merete Harding, Kurt Villads Jensen, Knud J. V. Jespersen, Danmarks Konger og Dronninger (Copenhagen, 2004)
- (in Danish) Bregnsbo, Michael. Caroline Mathilde – Magt og Skæbne. Denmark. Aschehoug Dansk Forlag, 2007. ISBN 978-87-11-11856-6
- (in Danish) Gether, Christian (editor), Kronprins og Menneskebarn (Sorø, 1988)
- (in Danish) Glebe-Møller. Struensees vej til skafottet – Fornuft og åbenbaring i oplysningstiden. Copenhagen. Museum Tusculanums Forlag, 2007. ISBN 978-87-635-0513-0
- (in Danish) Thiedecke, Johnny. For Folket. Oplysning, Magt og vanvid i Struensee-tidens Danmark. Viborg. Forlaget Pantheon, 2004. ISBN 87-90108-29-9
- (in German) Winkle, Stefan: Johann Friedrich Struensee. Arzt – Aufklärer – Staatsmann, Stuttgart: Fischer 1989 (2nd ed.). Online excerpt (Ärztekammer Hamburg).

==== Primary sources ====
- Alenius, Marianne, ed. (1986). Mit ubetydelige Levnets Løb. Efter Charlotte Dorothea Biehls breve (in Danish). Copenhagen: Museum Tusculanums Forlag.
- Cedergreen, Svend, ed. (1975). Brev fra Dorothea. Af Charlotta Dorothea Biehls historiske breve (in Danish). Copenhagen: Politikens Forlag.

Political offices
Preceded by Johann Hartwig Ernst von Bernstorff	Privy Councillor of Denmark; 1770 - 1772	Succeeded by Ove Høegh-Guldberg
