= A Royal Affair =

2012 film

- Film poster
- Danish: En kongelig affære
- Directed by: Nikolaj Arcel
- Written by: Nikolaj Arcel; Rasmus Heisterberg
- Based on: Prinsesse af blodet by Bodil Steensen-Leth
- Produced by: Meta Louise Foldager; Sisse Graum Jørgensen; Louise Vesth
- Starring: Mads Mikkelsen; Alicia Vikander; Mikkel Boe Følsgaard
- Cinematography: Rasmus Videbæk
- Edited by: Kasper Leick; Mikkel E.G. Nielsen
- Music by: Cyrille Aufort; Gabriel Yared
- Production company: Zentropa Entertainments
- Distributed by: Nordisk Film Distribution
- Release dates: 16 February 2012 (Berlinale); 29 March 2012 (Denmark)
- Running time: 137 minutes
- Countries: Czech Republic; Denmark; Germany; Sweden
- Languages: Danish; French; English
- Budget: 47,7 million kr. (US$7.8 million)
- Box office: US$14.7 million

A Royal Affair (Danish: En kongelig affære) is a 2012 drama film directed by Nikolaj Arcel, starring Mads Mikkelsen, Alicia Vikander and Mikkel Boe Følsgaard. The story is set in the 18th century, at the court of the mentally ill King Christian VII of Denmark-Norway, and focuses on the romance between his wife, Caroline Matilda of Great Britain, and the royal physician Johann Friedrich Struensee.

The film received two Silver Bears at the 62nd Berlin International Film Festival, and was nominated for the Academy Award for Best Foreign Language Film at the 85th Academy Awards. It was also nominated for the Best Foreign Language Film award at the 70th Golden Globe Awards.

== Plot ==
Princess Caroline Matilda of Great Britain is shown writing a letter to her children in which she professes to tell them the truth. In flashback, Caroline talks of England, as she was about to leave to marry Christian VII of Denmark. She is passionate about the arts and education, but when she arrives in Denmark she is told that many of her books are banned by the state. Christian is mentally ill and Caroline is unhappy in the marriage. She is soon pregnant with a son (Frederick VI of Denmark), but the couple grow far apart and the king stops visiting her bedroom.

The German doctor Johann Friedrich Struensee is recruited to work as the king's personal physician. Struensee is a man of the Enlightenment, greatly influenced by the writings of Jean-Jacques Rousseau. He keeps this secret from the state, who welcome him because his father is a well-known priest. King Christian takes a strong liking to Struensee and he becomes a close friend and confidant. When Struensee manages to inoculate Prince Frederick against a smallpox epidemic, he becomes greatly respected in the court. Christian has very little influence in the Privy Council, and the laws of the country are mostly decided by statesmen, but Struensee tells the king that he can have more power by "acting". The doctor begins writing speeches for the king which advocate his own progressive views, and several reforms are passed in Denmark.

Caroline and Struensee learn of their mutual interests and liberal views. They fall in love and begin an affair. When Caroline becomes pregnant, they protect themselves by convincing Christian to resume sleeping with her. As a result, Princess Louise Auguste is believed to be the king's daughter. Meanwhile, Struensee is appointed a Royal Adviser and eventually persuades Christian to assign him the right to pass any law, making him Denmark's de facto ruler. His reforms include the abolition of censorship, the abolition of torture, and reducing the power of the aristocracy. The queen dowager, Juliana Maria of Brunswick-Wolfenbüttel, notices the romance between Caroline and Struensee and their affair is revealed. Christian is initially angry, but he forgives his friend and states that they must carry on as if nothing had changed.

Juliana and the prominent statesman Ove Høegh-Guldberg are strongly against Struensee's reforms, while the Danish people also grow unhappy when it becomes clear an immoral foreigner has power over the country. Høegh-Guldberg incites a coup against him. Christian refuses to hand Struensee over to the people, but Høegh-Guldberg lies that the doctor and Caroline are planning to murder him and take control of Denmark. Christian thus allows Caroline to be arrested and taken to live in exile, while Struensee is sentenced to death. Christian issues a pardon, not wanting his friend to die, but Høegh-Guldberg keeps this from becoming known in time and Struensee is beheaded. Høegh-Guldberg becomes Denmark's new de facto leader, and many of Struensee's reforms are overturned.

The film returns to Caroline writing the letter, where she reveals that she is dying of an illness. Ten years later, Prince Frederick and Princess Louise Auguste read the letter. On-screen text reveals that Frederick soon became king via a coup d'état and returned to the reforming ways of Struensee.

== Cast ==
- Alicia Vikander as Caroline Matilda of Great Britain
- Mads Mikkelsen as Johann Friedrich Struensee
- Mikkel Boe Følsgaard as Christian VII
- David Dencik as Ove Høegh-Guldberg
- Søren Malling as Hartmann
- Trine Dyrholm as Juliana Maria of Brunswick-Wolfenbüttel
- William Jøhnk Nielsen as Frederick, Crown Prince of Denmark
- Cyron Bjørn Melville as Enevold Brandt
- Rosalinde Mynster as Natasha
- Laura Bro as Louise von Plessen
- Bent Mejding as Count Johann Hartwig Ernst von Bernstorff
- Thomas W. Gabrielsson as Schack Carl Rantzau
- Søren Spanning as Münster
- John Martinus as Christian Ditlev Reventlow
- Erika Guntherová as Lady in Waiting
- Harriet Walter as Princess Augusta of Saxe-Gotha
- Klaus Tange as Minister

== Production ==
Nikolaj Arcel and Rasmus Heisterberg started the writing process by reading the 1999 novel The Visit of the Royal Physician by Per Olov Enquist, which is based on the events surrounding Johann Friedrich Struensee's time at the Danish court. The exclusive film rights for the novel were already sold to a company which had been struggling for over a decade to make a large-scale adaptation in English, and did not want to sell the rights to Zentropa. Research continued and the film was eventually credited as based on Bodil Steensen-Leth's erotic novel Prinsesse af blodet, which tells the story from the perspective of the queen, Caroline Mathilde. The film's perspective and characterisation did still remain highly influenced by Enquist's version, in particular in the portrayal of Struensee as an idealistic promoter of freedom of speech, the romantic view of the royal court as an ironical charade and the role of the queen as a revolutionary partner-in-crime to Struensee. To avoid conflicts about rights, Enquist was contacted to clarify some instances of what he had made up and what was based on documented events, and a person was employed specifically to compare the screenplay and the novel to guarantee that they were dissimilar enough.

The film was produced by Zentropa and is a co-production among Denmark, Sweden and the Czech Republic. It had a budget of 47.7 million Danish kroner. (approximately US$7.8 million in 2022) Before settling on the final title, the film had the production titles Dronningen og livlægen ("The queen and the royal physician"), based in part on the title of Enquist's book, and Caroline Mathildes år ("Caroline Mathilde's years").

== Reception ==
=== Box office ===
A Royal Affair opened at 7 theaters domestically in its first week (from 9 to 15 November 2012), grossing US$59,841. In its second week, this doubled to US$120,012 for a total gross of US$179,853. It went on to gross a total of US$1,546,761 in 25 weeks domestically and US$13,212,236 internationally for a worldwide total of US$14,758,997 against a budget of US$7.8 million.

=== Critical response ===
Review aggregation website Rotten Tomatoes gives the film a score of 90% based on 112 reviews and an average rating of 7.25/10. The critical consensus reads: "A Royal Affair is a lavish and sumptuous costume drama with a juicy story to back it up." Metacritic gives a weighted average rating of 73 based on reviews from 27 critics, indicating "generally favorable reviews".

British Film Critic Mark Kermode tied the film as the Best Film of 2012 along with Berberian Sound Studio.

Historian Alfred Brown notes that the film depicts Struensee as speaking fluent Danish, when in fact he did not speak it and persistently used German, which helped alienate him from Danish society. Brown also notes that "The exiled Queen's letter to her children makes a good frame story to the film, however had she in reality written such a letter – frankly admitting Princess Louise Auguste's true parentage – it might have easily fallen into the wrong hands and caused the young princess to be declared a bastard".

=== Accolades ===
At the Berlin Film Festival, Mikkel Boe Følsgaard won the Silver Bear for Best Actor and Nikolaj Arcel and Rasmus Heisterberg won the award for Best Screenplay.

Year	Award	Category	Recipient	Result
2012	Berlin International Film Festival	Golden Bear	Nikolaj Arcel	Nominated
2012	Berlin International Film Festival	Best Screenplay	Nikolaj Arcel and Rasmus Heisterberg	Won
2012	Berlin International Film Festival	Best Actor	Mikkel Boe Følsgaard	Won
2012	Dallas–Fort Worth Film Critics Association	Best Foreign Language Film	A Royal Affair	Nominated
2012	Satellite Awards	Best Foreign Language Film	A Royal Affair	Nominated
2012	Satellite Awards	Best Costume Design	Manon Rasmussen	Won
2012	Satellite Awards	Best Art Direction and Production Design	Niels Sejer	Nominated
2012	Washington D.C. Area Film Critics Association Awards	Best Foreign Language Film	A Royal Affair	Nominated
2013	Academy Awards	Best Foreign Language Film	A Royal Affair	Nominated
2013	Bodil Awards	Best Danish Film	A Royal Affair	Nominated
2013	Bodil Awards	Best Actor in a Leading Role	Mikkel Boe Følsgaard	Won
2013	Bodil Awards	Best Actor in a Leading Role	Mads Mikkelsen	Nominated
2013	Bodil Awards	Best Actress in a Leading Role	Alicia Vikander	Nominated
2013	Bodil Awards	Best Actor in a Supporting Role	Thomas W. Gabrielsson	Nominated
2013	Bodil Awards	Best Actress in a Supporting Role	Trine Dyrholm	Nominated
2013	Bodil Awards	Best Cinematography	Rasmus Videbæk	Won
2013	Bodil Awards	Henning Bahs Award	Niels Sejer	Won
2013	Golden Globe Awards	Best Foreign Language Film	A Royal Affair	Nominated
2013	Robert Awards	Best Danish Film	A Royal Affair	Nominated
2013	Robert Awards	Best Director	Nikolaj Arcel	Won
2013	Robert Awards	Best Screenplay	Nikolaj Arcel and Rasmus Heisterberg	Nominated
2013	Robert Awards	Best Actor in a Leading Role	Mads Mikkelsen	Nominated
2013	Robert Awards	Best Actress in a Leading Role	Alicia Vikander	Nominated
2013	Robert Awards	Best Actor in a Supporting Role	Mikkel Boe Følsgaard	Won
2013	Robert Awards	Best Actress in a Supporting Role	Trine Dyrholm	Won
2013	Robert Awards	Best Production Design	Niels Sejer	Won
2013	Robert Awards	Best Cinematography	Rasmus Videbæk	Won
2013	Robert Awards	Best Costume Design	Manon Rasmussen	Won
2013	Robert Awards	Best Makeup	Ivo Strangmüller and Dennis Knudsen	Won
2013	Robert Awards	Best Editing	Kasper Leick and Mikkel E.G. Nielsen	Nominated
2013	Robert Awards	Best Sound Design	Claus Lynge and Hans Christian Kock	Nominated
2013	Robert Awards	Best Score	Cyrille Aufort and Gabriel Yared	Won
2013	Robert Awards	Best Visual Effects	Jeppe N. Christensen, Esben Syberg, and Rikke Hovgaard Jørgensen	Won

== See also ==
- The Dictator, a 1935 film about the same events
- List of submissions to the 85th Academy Awards for Best Foreign Language Film
- List of Danish submissions for the Academy Award for Best Foreign Language Film
