= Count Johann von Bernstorff =

Count Johann von Bernstorff may refer to:

- Count Johann Heinrich von Bernstorff, the German ambassador to America from 1908 to 1917.
- Count Johann Hartwig Ernst von Bernstorff, Danish statesman, chamberlain to the elector of Hanover
