= The Visit of the Royal Physician =

1999 novel by Per Olov Enquist

- First edition
- Author: Per Olov Enquist
- Original title: Livläkarens besök
- Translator: Tiina Nunnally
- Language: Swedish
- Publisher: Norstedts Förlag
- Publication date: 1999
- Publication place: Sweden
- English publication date: 2001
- Pages: 387
- ISBN: 91-1-300755-6

The Visit of the Royal Physician (Swedish: Livläkarens besök) is a 1999 novel by the Swedish writer Per Olov Enquist. It is known as The Royal Physician's Visit in the United States, translated into English by Tiina Nunnally. Against the backdrop of political turbulence and the enlightenment in the second half of the 18th century, the narrative revolves around the court of the mentally ill King Christian VII of Denmark, and the romance between the king's physician, Johann Friedrich Struensee, and the queen, Caroline Mathilde. The novel won the August Prize and the Independent Foreign Fiction Prize.

== Reception ==
John de Falbe of The Spectator wrote that "Enquist has imagined this appalling drama with immense sensitivity and intelligence." De Falbe continued: "Enquist writes in short, jerky sentences which often seem to repeat themselves. Although disconcerting at first, the technique works brilliantly. The atmosphere is suitably nervy, while the shifting ground beneath the apparent repetitions is vibrant with stealth and subterfuge. ... The swirling currents - emotional, political, social, spiritual - are so vivid that we cannot doubt the relevance of this historical tale." Bruce Bawer reviewed the book for The New York Times, and wrote that "Enquist's principal characters are realized with a vividness and subtlety that place the book in the front ranks of contemporary literary fiction", and called the prose "brisk, lucid, vigorous, penetrating, rich in arresting epigrams and marked by calculated repetitions that give the novel a touch of hypnotic power."

== Adaptation ==
The novel was adapted into an opera by Bo Holten, premiered in 2009.

== See also ==
- 1999 in literature
- Swedish literature
- A Royal Affair
