= The Dictator (1935 film) =

1935 British film by Victor Saville

- Swedish release poster
- Directed by: Victor Saville
- Screenplay by: Benn W. Levy; Jan Lustig; Hans Wilhelm
- Produced by: Curtis Bernhardt; Ludovico Toeplitz
- Starring: Clive Brook; Madeleine Carroll; Emlyn Williams; Helen Haye; Frank Cellier; Isabel Jeans; Alfred Drayton; Nicholas Hannen; Ruby Miller; Heather Thatcher
- Cinematography: Franz Planer
- Edited by: Paul Weatherwax
- Music by: Karol Rathaus
- Production company: Toeplitz Productions Ltd.
- Distributed by: Gaumont British Distributors
- Release dates: 1 February 1935 (Premiere, Paris)
- Running time: 86 minutes
- Country: United Kingdom
- Language: English
- Budget: £100,000

The Dictator (also known as The Love Affair of the Dictator and For the Love of a Queen; U.S. title: Loves of a Dictator) is a 1935 British historical drama film directed by Victor Saville and starring Clive Brook, Madeleine Carroll, Emlyn Williams and Helen Haye. It was written by Benn W. Levy, Jan Lustig and Hans Wilhelm. Saville took over directing from Al Santell.

== Plot ==
Loosely based on real events, the film depicts a dramatic episode in Danish history: the tumultuous relationship between King Christian VII of Denmark and his English consort Caroline Matilda in 18th century Copenhagen and the Queen's tragic affair with the royal physician and liberal reformer Johann Friedrich Struensee.

== Cast ==
- Clive Brook as Johann Friedrich Struensee.
- Madeleine Carroll as Caroline Matilde of Denmark
- Emlyn Williams as Christian VII of Denmark
- Helen Haye as Queen Mother Juliana
- Frank Cellier as Sir Murray Keith
- Isabel Jeans as Elisabet von Eyben
- Alfred Drayton as Count Brandt
- Nicholas Hannen as Guldberg, the Prime Minister
- Ruby Miller as Hilda
- Heather Thatcher as lady
- James Carew as minor role

== Reception ==
The Monthly Film Bulletin wrote: "An outstanding British film, very ably directed. Both acting and dialogue are extremely polished, and not out of tune with the period. ... This is one of Clive Brook's most satisfying performances, in a role which fits him beautifully. On the other side may be set the fact that the historical accuracy of the details is here and there a trifle dubious; and the film never really explains Struensee's ascendancy or gives us any proper idea of his powers and position."

Kine Weekly wrote: "Here is costume drama of quality, a spectacular pageant of Danish eighteenth century history, painted in rich colors and lightly warmed by a tenderly handled love interest. The concluding chapters of the intriguing story of a bid for dictatorship are too restrained in their emotionalism to permit of a powerful climax – the first part is more vital and colorful than the second – but what the film lacks in fire it gains in intimacy."

Variety wrote: "This is one of the most lavish costume pictures that has come out of England. Supposed to have cost $500,000. Sets and costumes give the impression of tremendous royal wealth; entire action takes place in gorgeous palaces; one banquet scene, with ballet music, is as good as anything ever seen on the screen. ... Trouble is with the story ... It’s a love tale of a beautiful queen and an ambitious young man – not developed in such a way as to be really dramatic."

== See also ==
- The Love of a Queen (1923)
- King in Shadow (1957)
- A Royal Affair (2012)
