= The Love of a Queen (1923 film) =

1923 film

- Film poster
- German: Die Liebe einer Königin
- Directed by: Ludwig Wolff
- Written by: Ludwig Wolff
- Produced by: Paul Ebner; Maxim Galitzenstein; Ludwig Wolff
- Starring: Harry Liedtke; Henny Porten; Walter Janssen
- Cinematography: Julius Balting; Axel Graatkjær
- Production company: Maxim-Film
- Distributed by: Bavaria Film; Gaumont (France)
- Release date: 14 September 1923
- Country: Germany
- Languages: Silent; German intertitles

The Love of a Queen (German: Die Liebe einer Königin) is a 1923 German silent historical drama film directed by Ludwig Wolff and starring Harry Liedtke, Henny Porten and Walter Janssen. It is based on the eighteenth century affair between the Danish Queen Caroline Matilda and the court physician Johann Friedrich Struensee.

The film's sets were designed by the art director Heinrich Beisenherz and Fritz Seyffert.

== Cast ==
- Harry Liedtke as Johann Friedrich Struensee
- Henny Porten as The Queen
- Walter Janssen as Der König
- Olga Limburg as Queen-Widow
- Annemarie Mörike as Court lady
- Friedrich Kayßler
- Hermann Vallentin
- Louis Ralph
- Adele Sandrock
- Erna Hauk
- Rudolf Biebrach
- Max Gülstorff
- Louis V. Arco

== See also ==
- The Dictator (1935)
- King in Shadow (1957)
- A Royal Affair (2012)
