= The Visit of the Royal Physician (opera) =

Livlægens Besøg (The Visit of the Royal Physician) is a 2009 Danish-language opera by Bo Holten based on the best-selling Swedish novel Livläkarens besök by Per Olov Enquist.

== Recording ==
- The Visit of the Royal Physician DVD (Sung in Danish with English subtitles) 2009 - Johan Reuter (Johann Friedrich Struensee), Gert Henning-Jensen (King Christian VII), Elisabeth Jansson (Queen Caroline Mathilde), Sten Byriel (Ove Høegh-Guldberg), Djina Mai-Mai (Bootee-Caterine) & Gitta-Maria Sjöberg (Queen Dowager Juliane Marie) Royal Danish Opera Choir & Royal Danish Orchestra, Bo Holten. Da Capo
