= Musica Ficta (Danish ensemble) =

Danish choral group

Musica Ficta is a Danish choral group founded in 1996 by conductor and composer Bo Holten.

== Selected discography ==
- Mogens Pedersøn (1585-1623) Madrigals. Musica Ficta, Holten. Da Capo.
- A Danish Christmas, Musica Ficta, Holten. Naxos (compilation from Danish release)
- Johannes Ockeghem (1430-1497): Missa pro defunctis (Requiem), Naxos
- Winds & Voices at the Court of Christian III, Copenhagen Cornetts & Sackbutts, Musica Ficta, Holten
- Medieval Music from Denmark Musica Ficta, Holten Da Capo
- Seized by Sweet Desire - Singing Nuns and Ladies Naxos
- Danish children's songs by contemporary Danish composers. EXLCD 30062 · 1997
- C. E. F. Weyse: Songs and romances. Naxos Denmark 8.554961 · 1998
- Romantic songs - Sange fra Romantikken. Naxos Denmark 8.554964 · 1999
- Carl Nielsen: Motets op.53, selection of songs. Naxos Denmark 8.554965 · 2000
- Højskolesangen: Songs from Grundtvig's "High School movement" 1900-1970. Naxos Denmark 8.554970 · 2001
- 20th Century songs - Sange fra det 20. århundrede Naxos Denmark 8.554973 · 2001
- Danish Folk Songs with Poul Høxbro. Naxos Denmark 8.557424 · 2004
- Children's Songs - Børnesange. Naxos Denmark 8.557730 · 2004
- Songs to lyrics of H. C. Andersen. Naxos Denmark 8.557810 · 2005
- Songs to lyrics of J. P. Jacobsen. Naxos Denmark 8.572070 · 2008
- Danish Songs - Denmark Ministry of Culture Naxos Denmark 8.570175 · 2006
- Thomisson's Easter Ribe Cathedral 1560 - Clemens non Papa: Missa Virtute magna. Da Capo 2018
