= Operation Orfeo =

Operation Orfeo is a conceptual opera in three movements with music by Bo Holten, based on the legend of Orpheus and Eurydice. The libretto is written by Ib Michael and the concept is created by Kirsten Dehlholm of Hotel Pro Forma. It was premiered in 1993.

The opera is described as a visual opera. A "reconceptualisation of the opera genre. Causal and dramaturgic sequence in libretto and music is replaced by a series of tableaux and compositions informed by purely visual and auditive principles rather than by dramatic modes of narration".
