= Schack Carl Rantzau =

Danish-Norwegian general (1717–1789)

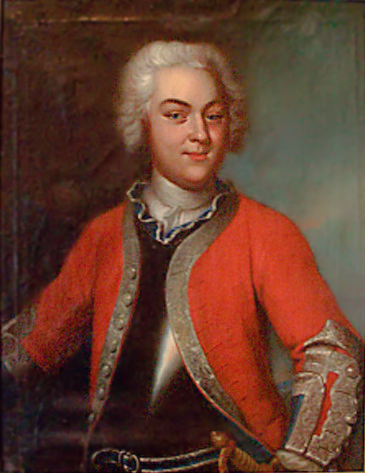

Commander-in-chief of the Norwegian army
- Predecessor: Waldemar Hermann Schmettau
- Successor: Claus Jørgen Schnell
- Born: 11 March 1717; Ascheberg estate, Holstein
- Died: 21 January 1789 (aged 71); Menerbes, France
- Noble family: Rantzau
- Father: Hans zu Rantzau
- Occupation: Officer and Statesman

Schack Carl, rigsgreve (von) Rantzau or Carl Schack Rantzau-Ascheberg (11 March 1717, Ascheberg estate, Holstein – 21 January 1789, Menerbes, France) was a Holstein-born Danish-Norwegian officer and statesman. He was the commander-in-chief of the Norwegian army in 1766, but lost the position the next year. He is notable for his friendship with Johann Friedrich Struensee and his role in the coup which led to Struensee's fall from power in 1772.

== Commander-in-chief of the Norwegian army ==
In the 1760s he befriended Claude Louis de Saint-Germain, one of the most powerful men in Denmark-Norway at the time. In 1766 he was promoted to lieutenant general, and on the initiative of Saint-Germain he was sent as Commander-in-chief of the Norwegian army, April 4 of the same year. Norway was not the right place for a man like Rantzau. He found it indescribably boring to live in the country, and in a letter he wrote; ..this Land of the Devil, where there is not even a tree strong enough for a man to hang himself. He insulted the people of Norway, with his manner of behaviour. The stay in Norway was a short one. When Saint-Germain got deposed at the end of 1767. Rantzau was ordered to immediately resign, and go to Holstein and stay there. When he left Christiania, stones were thrown at him by the city's inhabitants.

=== Rantzau and skiing ===
During his time as Commander-in-chef, Rantzau was an important figure in development of several skiing sports. In 1767 he codified four classes of military skiing contests and established prizes for each: The four skiing contests were:

- Shooting at prescribed targets at 40–50 paces while skiing downhill at "top speed" (precursor to biathlon).
- "Hurling" themselves while racing downhill among trees "without falling or breaking skis" (precursor to slalom).
- Downhill racing on large slopes without "riding or resting on their stick" or falling (precursor to downhill racing).
- "Long racing" with full military kit and a gun on the shoulder over ca. 2.5 km of "flat ground" within 15 minutes (precursor to modern cross-country skiing).

== Under Struensees rule ==
In Holstein, Rantzau became friend with Johann Friedrich Struensee. When Struensee became regent of Denmark and Norway, in December 1770, he gave Rantzau a central role in the new regime. But Struensee sidelined Rantzau and they became enemies, and 17 January 1772 he was involved in deposing and arresting Struensee.

== After Struensee ==
After the fall of Struensee, Rantzau received several honors and rewards. He was appointed to the rank of general and he was given a seat in the government of Ove Høegh-Guldberg. On 9 July 1772 he was dismissed from his posts. 21 January 1789, he died in Menerbes, France, at the age of 71.
