= Bo Holten =

Danish composer and conductor

Bo Holten (born 22 October 1948) is a Danish composer and conductor.

He has been the principal conductor for the vocal ensembles Ars Nova (Copenhagen) and Musica Ficta (Denmark), as well as guest-conductor for the BBC Singers. He was the principal conductor for the Flemish Radio Choir (Vlaams Radio Koor) in Brussels until 2012.

As a composer he has written more than 100 works, including 6 operas, 2 musicals, 2 symphonies, and 5 solo concertos. He has also composed several film scores, amongst them the music for Lars Von Trier's The Element of Crime.

== Notable works ==
- Sinfonia concertante for Cello & Orchestra (1987)
- Concerto for clarinet and orchestra (1990)
- Wisdom and Folly, choir (1993)
- Operation Orfeo, opera (1993)
- The Marriage of Heaven and Hell (Holten), choir (1992–95)
- Gesualdo, Opera (2003)
- The Physician-In-Ordinary's Visit (Livlægens Besøg), Opera (2008)
