= Count Johann Hartwig Ernst von Bernstorff =

German-Danish statesman (1712–1772)

Johann Hartwig von Bernstorff
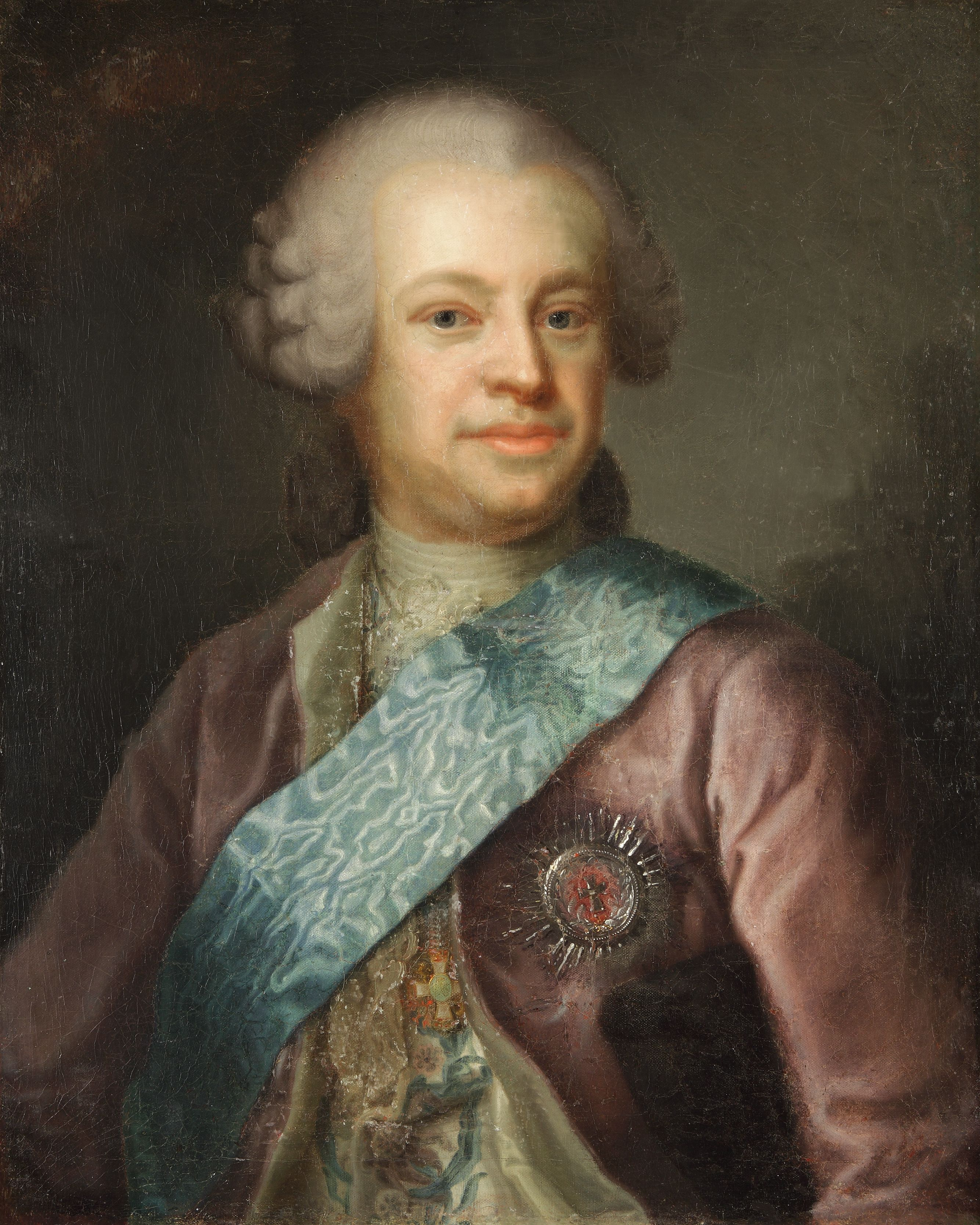

Privy Councillor of Denmark
- Predecessor: Johan Ludvig Holstein-Ledreborg
- Successor: Johann Friedrich Struensee
- Born: 12 May 1712; Hanover, Electorate of Hanover, Holy Roman Empire
- Died: 18 February 1772 (aged 59); Hamburg, Holy Roman Empire
- Noble family: Bernstorff
- Father: Joachim Engelke von Bernstorff
- Occupation: Statesman and diplomat

Count Johann Hartwig Ernst von Bernstorff (German: Johann Hartwig Ernst Graf von Bernstorff; 13 May 1712 – 18 February 1772) was a German-Danish statesman and a member of the Bernstorff noble family of Mecklenburg. He was the son of Joachim Engelke Freiherr von Bernstorff, chamberlain to the Elector of Hanover.

== Early political career ==
His grandfather, Andreas Gottlieb von Bernstorff (1640–1726), had been one of the ablest ministers of George I and the head of the German Chancery. Under his guidance, Johann was very carefully educated, acquiring amongst other things that intimate knowledge of the leading European languages, especially French, which ever afterwards distinguished him. He was introduced into the Danish service by his relations, the brothers Plessen, who were ministers of state under Christian VI.

In 1732, he was sent on a diplomatic mission to the court of Dresden, and from 1738 he represented Holstein at the Eternal Diet of Regensburg. From 1744 to 1750, he represented Denmark at Paris, whence he returned in 1754 to Denmark as Minister of Foreign Affairs. Supported by the powerful favorite Adam Gottlob Moltke, and highly respected by Frederick V, he occupied for twenty-one years the highest position in the government, and in the Council of State his opinion was decisive. But his chief concern was foreign policy.

== Prelude ==
Ever since the conclusion of the Great Northern War, Danish statesmen had been occupied in harvesting its fruits, namely, the Gottorp portions of Schleswig definitely annexed to Denmark in 1721 by the Treaty of Nystad, and endeavouring to bring about a definitive general understanding with the House of Gottorp as to their remaining possessions in Holstein. With the head of the Swedish branch of the Gottorps, the crown prince Adolph Frederick, things had been arranged by the exchange of 1750; but an attempt to make a similar arrangement with the chief of the elder Gottorp line, the Czarevitch Peter Feodorovich, had failed.

In intimate connection with the Gottorp affair stood the question of the political equilibrium of the north. Ever since Russia had become the dominant Baltic power, as well as the state to which the Gottorpers looked primarily for help, the necessity for a better understanding between the two Scandinavian kingdoms had clearly been recognized by the best statesmen of both, especially in Denmark from Christian VI's time; but unfortunately this sound and sensible policy was seriously impeded by the survival of the old national hatred on both sides of The Sound, still further complicated by the Gottorps' hatred of Denmark. Moreover, it was a diplomatic axiom in Denmark, founded on experience, that an absolute monarchy in Sweden was incomparably more dangerous to her neighbour than a limited monarchy, and after the collapse of Swedish absolutism with Charles XII, the upholding of the comparatively feeble, and ultimately anarchical parliamentary government of Sweden became a question of principle with Danish statesmen throughout the 18th century.

== Bernstorff's Denmark ==
A friendly alliance with a relatively weak Sweden was the cardinal point of Bernstorff's policy. But his plans were reversed again and again by unforeseen complications, the failure of the most promising presumptions, the perpetual shifting of apparently stable alliances; and again and again he had to modify his means to attain his ends. Amidst all these perplexities Bernstorff proved himself a consummate statesman. It seemed almost as if his wits were sharpened into a keener edge by his very difficulties; but since he condemned on principle every war which was not strictly defensive, and it had fallen to his lot to guide a comparatively small power, he always preferred the way of negotiation, even sometimes where the diplomatic tangle would perhaps best have been severed boldly by the sword.

== Seven Years' War ==
The first difficult problem he had to face was the Seven Years' War. He was determined to preserve the neutrality of Denmark at any cost, and this he succeeded in doing, despite the existence of a subsidy-treaty with the king of Prussia, and the suspicions of Britain and Sweden. It was through his initiative, too, that the Convention of Klosterzeven was signed (10 September 1757), and on the 4 May 1758 he concluded a still more promising treaty with France, whereby, in consideration of Denmark's holding an army-corps of 24,000 men in Holstein until the end of the war, to secure Hamburg, Lübeck, and the Gottorp part of Holstein from invasion, France, and ultimately Austria also, engaged to bring about an exchange between the king of Denmark and the Czarevitch, as regards Holstein.

But the course of the war made this compact inoperative. Austria hastened to repudiate her guarantee to Denmark in order not to offend the new emperor of Russia, Czar Peter III, and one of Peter's first acts on ascending the throne was to declare war against Denmark. The coolness and firmness of Bernstorff saved the situation. He protested that the king of Denmark was bound to defend Schleswig so long as there was a sword in Denmark and a drop of blood in the veins of the Danish people. He rejected the insulting ultimatum of the Russian emperor. He placed the best French general of the day at the head of the well-equipped Danish army.

But just as the Russian and Danish armies had come within striking distance, the tidings reached Copenhagen that Peter III had been overthrown by his consort, Catherine II.

== After the war ==
Bernstorff was one of the first to recognize the impotence of the French monarchy after the Seven Years' War, and in 1763 he considered it expedient to exchange the French for the Russian alliance, which was cemented by the treaty of the 28 April 1765. This compact engaged Denmark to join with Russia in upholding the existing Swedish constitution, in return for which Czarina Catherine II agreed to resolve the Gottorp Question by the cession of the Gottorp portion of Holstein in exchange for the counties of Oldenburg and Delmenhorst, an exchange realized in the 1773 Treaty of Tsarskoye Selo. For his part in this treaty Bernstorff was created count.

== Fall from power ==
On the accession of Christian VII, in 1766, Bernstorff's position became very precarious, and he was exposed to all manner of attacks, being accused of exploiting Denmark, and of unduly promoting foreigners. It is remarkable, however, that though Bernstorff ruled Denmark for twenty years he never learnt the Danish language. His last political achievement was to draw still closer to Russia by the treaty of the 13 December 1769, the most important paragraph of which stipulated that any change in the Swedish constitution should be regarded by Denmark and Russia as a casus belli against Sweden, and that in the event of such a war Denmark should retain all the territory conquered from Sweden. This treaty proved to be a great mistake on Denmark's part, but circumstances seemed at the time to warrant it. Nine months later, on the 13 September 1770, Bernstorff was dismissed as the result of Johann Friedrich Struensee's intrigues, and, rejecting the brilliant offers of Catherine II if he would enter the Russian service, retired to his German estates, where he died on the 18 February 1772.

== Sources ==
- Poul Vedel, Den ældre Grev Bernstorffs ministerium (Copenhagen, 1882);
- Correspondence ministirielle du Comte J. H. E. Bernstorff, ed. Vedel (Copenhagen, 1882);
- Aage Friis, Bernstorfferne og Danmark (Copenhagen, 1899). (R. N. B.).

Political offices
Preceded by Johan Ludvig Holstein-Ledreborg	Privy Councillor of Denmark; 1751 - 1770	Succeeded by Johann Friedrich Struensee
