= Bodil Steensen-Leth =

Danish writer

Bodil Steensen-Leth, née Heide-Jørgensen (born 12 January 1945, Svendborg) is a Danish writer.

She is the daughter of Henning Heide-Jørgensen and graduated from the Svendborg Gymnasium in 1963. After studying at the University of Oregon (1963–1964) and the University of Copenhagen, she married the landowner Christian Vincens Steensen-Leth in 1967 and moved to his Steensgård manorhouse in northern Langeland. At the same time she began a distance-learning course from Odense University, graduating MA in English in 1972.

Only when her children had started to grow up did she find enough time for writing, producing her debut Pandæmonien og andre fortællinger (Pandæmonien and other stories) in 1984. She was also a literary critic for the Jyllands-Posten from 1978 to 1998 and a member of the Modersmålsselskabet's board of directors from 1982 to 1988. She received a one-off payment from the Danish Arts Foundation in 1988 and a grant from them in 1999.

== Works ==
- Pandæmonion, novella, 1984
- Dødens labyrint, novella, 1986
- Alle stirrer på mig, novel, 1987
- Jomfru Fanny, novel, 1989
- Møller, novel, 1991
- Stenen og lyset, novel, 1994
- Den sidste koncert, novella, 1996
- Ikke som en spottefugl, novel, 1998
- Prinsesse af blodet, novel, 2000
- Guds øje, novella, 2002
- Lili, novel, 2004
- Fem år i Berlin, novel, 2008
- Tradition og fornyelse, 2009 – part of the Slægten (race) series of novels
