= Robert Neumann (writer) =

Austrian writer (1897–1975)

Robert Neumann (22 May 1897, in Vienna – 3 January 1975, in Munich) was a German- and English-language Austrian Jewish writer. He published numerous novels, autobiographical texts, plays and radio plays as well a few scripts. Through his parody collections, Mit fremden Federn (With Strange Feathers; 1927) and Unter falscher Flagge (Under False Flag; 1932), he is considered as the founder of "parody as a critical genre in the literature of the 1920s."

== Life ==
Robert Neumann was the son of a Jewish bank clerk with social democratic leanings. Neumann studied medicine, chemistry, and one semester of German studies from 1915 to 1919 in Vienna. He worked as a cashier, swim coach, and associate for a food importing company, but was forced to declare bankruptcy in 1925. Afterwards he worked for a short time as a sailor and cargo supervisor on a cruise ship.

Having already published small volumes of lyric poetry in 1919 and 1923, he succeeded in a literary breakthrough in parody with the collection Mit fremden Federn in 1927. In a survey, Thomas Mann judged that book the best of the year. Neumann thus established himself and became a freelance writer. He published other novels, parodies and plays in rapid succession. In addition, he lectured and worked as a literary critic for, among others, Die Literatur and Die literarische Welt. His parodies were so successful that his other work faded by contrast. Rudolf Walter Leonhardt later wrote in his obituary of Robert Neumann about his public success: "Two narrow bands have a lifetime of fifteen thick volumes buried."

Neumann's works were victims of Nazi book burnings in 1933 and were banned by the Third Reich. Immediately after the establishment of the Austro-fascist dictatorship in February 1934, he left Vienna and went into exile in Britain. In 1936 and 1937 he spent a few months in Austria, where the libraries were purged of his works. Until 1938 his novels still appeared in Switzerland.

He was one of few writers in exile who managed to get published in England. In 1935 he wrote the story for the British film Abdul the Damned with Fritz Kortner in the lead role. After the occupation of Austria in 1938, he organized the "Free Austrian P.E.N.-Club" in London to assist writers threatened by Nazis to leave their country. In 1939, he applied for British citizenship, but did not receive it until 1947. Instead, he was interned in 1940 for a few months as an "enemy alien." During the war years he periodically delivered reviews for the BBC. From 1942 he published six novels in English. As editor and co-owner of the publishing house "Hutchinson International Authors," he initiated the publication of English translations of German writers in exile such as Arnold Zweig and Heinrich Mann. His request for an entry visa into the United States was rejected, despite an invitation to Hollywood. Rudolf Walter Leonhardt maintained that the novel An den Wassern von Babylon (By the Rivers of Babylon; see Psalm 137), published in 1939 in English and 1945 in German, was Neumann's best book: a Jewish epic of overwhelming urgency.

After the end of World War II, Neumann continued living in England until the end of 1958, then in Locarno in Ticino, Switzerland. In 1947 he became honorary president of the revived Austrian PEN Club. In 1955 he said in his closing speech at the congress of the International PEN, in which he was also Vice President in 1950, a speech against the "Cold War" PEN president Charles Langbridge Morgan for which he was attacked in the press as a "communist." In 1971 he demanded a reorientation of the PEN against right-wing efforts. He initiated the dismissal of the former PEN President Pierre Emmanuel and proposed the candidacy of Heinrich Böll, who was also elected in a vote. In 1966 he published, in the leftist magazine Zeitschrift Konkret, a sharp polemic against the Group 47 and especially against Hans Werner Richter, Walter Höllerer and Günter Grass.

Between 1959 and 1974, Neumann continued to work as a novelist, political journalist and acclaimed literary critic with a polemical and satirical orientation, including for konkret, Die Zeit, pardon (magazine), Tribüne , Deutsche Zeitung - Christ und Welt and ARD broadcasters. Occasionally, he also published in Der Spiegel and Stern. In 1961 he was involved in a plagiarism controversy concerning his novel Olympia.

Neumann, who fought serious illnesses several times in his life, became terminally ill in 1974 with cancer. After his suicide, according to a statement from his family, he was buried in 1975 in the Munich Haidhausen cemetery. His Nachlass is located in the Department of Manuscripts of the Austrian National Library in Vienna.

== Family ==
Neumann married Stefanie ("Stefie") Grünwald (1896–1975) in 1919 in Vienna, with whom he had a son named Henry Herbert ("Heini") (1921–1944). For him he wrote the autobiographical text Memoirs and Journal of Henry Herbert Neumann, edited by his father in 1944. In 1941 Neumann settled for divorce and married the German editor and translator Lore Franziska ("Rolly") Stern, born Becker (1908–1991), on 30 May 1941, with whom he divorced in 1952. In 1953 he married the German dancer Evelyn Milda Wally Hengerer (pseudonym: Mathilde Walewska, 1930–1958) with whom he had a son Michael Robert Henry (born 1955). In 1960 he settled in his fourth marriage, with broadcasting editor Helga Heller (1934–1976).

== Awards and honors ==
- Acting President of Austrian P.E.N. in London (1939–1947)
- Honorary President of the Austrian PEN Club (1947)
- Vice President of International PEN (1950)
- Austrian Cross of Honour for Science and Art 1st class (1965)
- Honorary Medal of the Austrian capital Vienna in Gold (1967)
- Member of the German Academy for Language and Literature (1967)

== Publications (selection) ==
- Gedichte (1919)
- Zwanzig Gedichte (1923)
- Die Pest von Lianora (1927)
- Mit fremden Federn (1927)
- Jagd auf Menschen und Gespenster (1928)
- Die Blinden von Kagoll (1929)
- Sintflut, Novel (1929)
- Hochstaplernovelle (1930)
- Passion: Sechs Dichter-Ehen (1930)
- Panoptikum: Bericht über fünf Ehen aus der Zeit. (1930)
- Karriere (1931)
- Das Schiff Espérance (1931)
- Die Macht, Novel (1932)
- Unter falscher Flagge: Ein Lesebuch der deutschen Sprache für Fortgeschrittene (1932)
- Sir Basil Zaharoff: Der König der Waffen (1934)
- Die blinden Passagiere (1935)
- Struensee: Doktor, Diktator, Favorit und armer Sünder (1935)
- Eine Frau hat geschrien (1938)
- Scene in Passing (1942)
- The Inquest, Novel (1944)
- By the waters of Babylon (1939)
- Children of Vienna, Novel (1946)
- Tibbs, Novel (1948)
- Blind Man's Buff (1949)
- Insurrection in Poshansk (1952)
- Mein altes Haus in Kent: Erinnerungen an Menschen und Gespenster, Autobiography (1957)
- Die dunkle Seite des Mondes, Novel (1959)
- Ausflüchte unseres Gewissens, Document on Hitler's 'final solution' (1960)
- with Helga Koppel: Hitler: Aufstieg und Untergang des Dritten Reiches, A document in pictures (1961)
- Olympia, Novel (1961)
- Festival, Novel (1962)
- Ein leichtes Leben: Bericht über mich selbst und Zeitgenossen, Autobiography (1963)
- Der Tatbestand oder Der gute Glaube der Deutschen, Novel (1965)
- Vielleicht das Heitere: Tagebuch aus einem andern Jahr, Autobiography (1968)
- Vorsicht Bücher: Parodien, samt einem Lese-Leitfaden für Fortgeschrittene (1969)
- Dämon Weib Oder die Selbstverzauberung durch Literatur. Samt technischen Hinweisen, wie man dorthin gelangt (1969)
- Nie wieder Politik: Eine Krankengeschichte mit vielen grausigen Beispielen samt einem unpolitischen Anhang. Konfrontationen. Oder von der Idiotie der Schriftsteller (1969)
- Deutschland, deine Österreicher: Österreich, deine Deutschen (1970)
- Oktoberreise mit einer Geliebten, Novel (1970)
- Ein unmöglicher Sohn, Novel (1972)
- 2 x 2 = 5: Eine Anleitung zum Rechtbehalten (1974)
- Die Kinder von Wien (1974)
- Franz Stadler (eds.): Robert Neumann. Mit eigener Feder. Aufsätze. Briefe. Nachlassmaterialien. (2013)
