= Juliana Maria =

Juliana Maria or Juliane Marie may refer to:

- Juliana Maria of Brunswick-Wolfenbüttel
- Juliane Marie Jessen (1760–1832), early Danish female author and translator
- Juliana Maria Antonia Primitz or Julija Primic (1816–1864), the poetic muse and unrequited love of the Slovene Romantic and national poet France Prešeren
- Dronning Juliana Maria (1752 DAC ship)
- Dronning Juliana Maria (1775 DAC ship)
- Dronning Juliana Maria (1790 DAC ship)
- Dronning Juliana Maria (1780 DAC ship)
