= Dronning Juliana Maria =

Dronning Juliana Maria ("Queen Juliana Maria") may refer to several Danish ships named after Juliana Maria of Brunswick-Wolfenbüttel:

- Dronning Juliana Maria (1752 DAC ship)
- Dronning Juliana Maria (1775 DAC ship)
- Dronning Juliana Maria (1790 DAC ship)
- Dronning Juliana Maria (1780 DAC ship)
