= Ørnen =

Ørnen may refer to:

- HDMS Ørnen, several Danish Navy ships
- HNoMS Ørnen, several Norwegian Navy ships
- Ørnen, a Danish TV series, known as The Eagle: A Crime Odyssey in English speaking countries

== See also ==
- Ørnen Rocks
- Örnen-class cruiser, Swedish Navy ships; including HSwMS Örnen
