= Hauken Rock =

Island in the South Shetland Islands

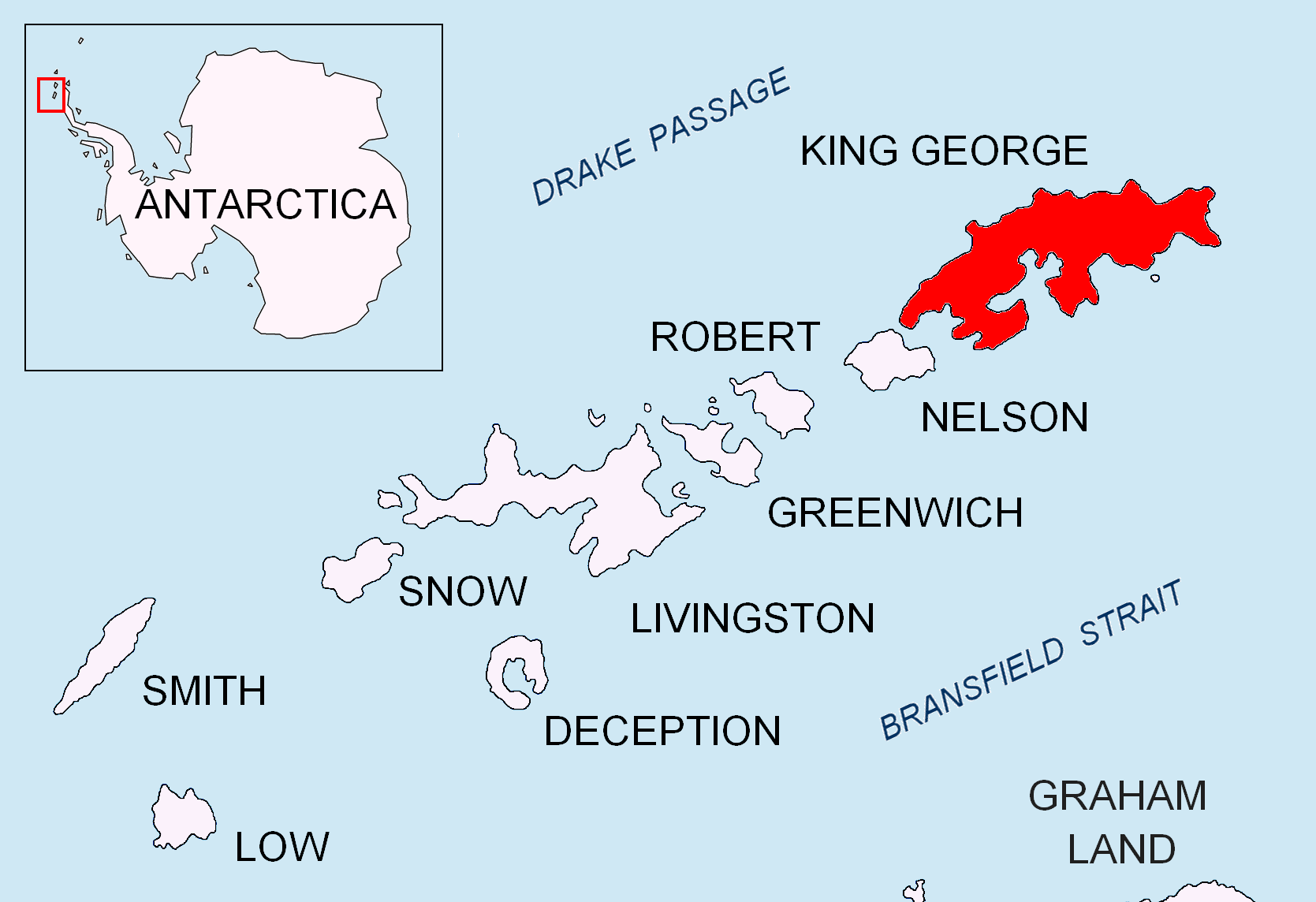
Location of King George Island in the South Shetland Islands.

Hauken Rock (62°1′S 57°33′W) is a rock lying nearly 1 nautical mile (2 km) east of the Ornen Rocks and 2 nautical miles (4 km) northeast of Cape Melville, the eastern extremity of King George Island, in the South Shetland Islands. It was named by the UK Antarctic Place-Names Committee in 1960 from association with Ornen Rocks. Hauken and Ørnen, the first two modern whale catchers, accompanied the floating factory ship Admiralen to the South Shetland Islands in January–February 1906.
