= Livonia (disambiguation) =

Livonia is a historical region now divided between Estonia and Latvia.

Livonia may also refer to:

== Places ==
=== In Europe ===
- The Livonian Coast, the remaining territory where the Livonian language is still spoken, in Latvia
- Livonia (Saeima constituency), a constituency of the Saeima in Latvia
- Duchy of Livonia (1561–1621), a territory of the Polish-Lithuanian Commonwealth
- Governorate of Livonia (1721–1918), a territory of the Russian Empire
- Inflanty Voivodeship (Polish Livonia) (1621–1772), a territory of the Polish-Lithuanian Commonwealth
- Kingdom of Livonia (1570–1578), a fief of Russia
- Swedish Livonia (1629–1721), a dominion of the Swedish Empire
- Terra Mariana (1207–1561), official name of medieval Livonia
- United Baltic Duchy or Grand Duchy of Livonia, a 1918 proposed state
- Livonia electoral district (Russian Constituent Assembly election, 1917)

=== In the United States ===
- Lavonia, Georgia
- Livonia, Indiana
- Livonia, Louisiana, a town
- Livonia, Michigan
- Livonia, Missouri, a village
- Livonia, New York
- Livonia (village), New York
- Livonia, Pennsylvania
- Livonia Avenue (BMT Canarsie Line), a street and subway stop in Brooklyn, New York
- Livonia Township, Sherburne County, Minnesota

=== Antarctica ===
- Livonia Rock

== Other uses ==
- Livonian language
- Livonia (album), a 1990 album by His Name Is Alive
- Livonia (gastropod), a genus of marine snails
- Livonia Cup, a football trophy contested annually between Estonian and Latvian domestic league champions
- Air Livonia, a small airline based in Estonia
- Livonia, a fictional country in the 2013 video game Arma 3, based on the eponymous historical region
