= HDMS Dannebrog =

19th-century Danish sailing ship

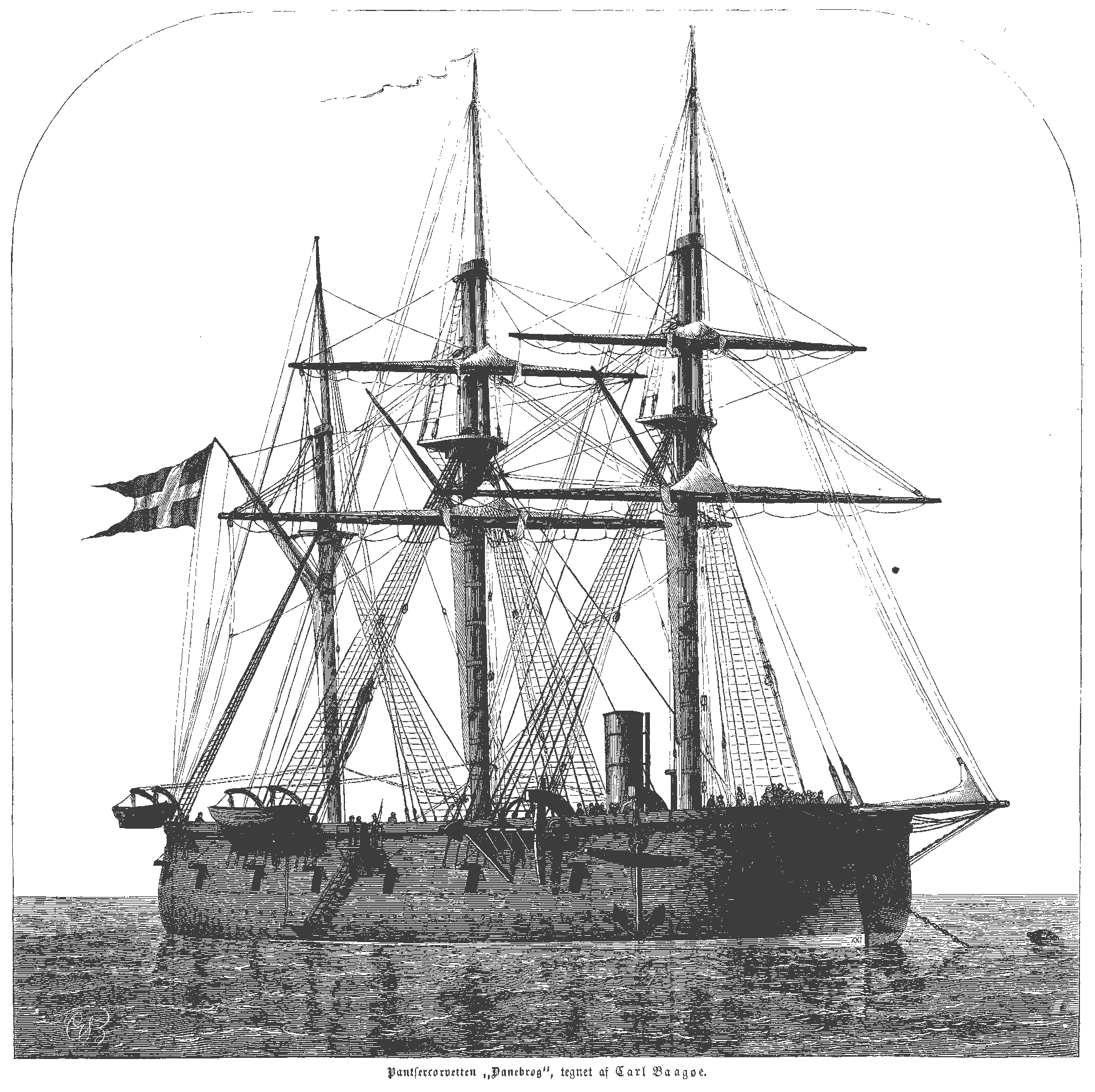
- Illustration of the Dannebrog after her conversion, in an article published on 10 April 1864 in the magazine Illustreret Tidende

History

Denmark
- Name: Dannebrog
- Namesake: Dannebrog
- Builder: Naval Dock Yard, Copenhagen
- Laid down: 28 April 1848
- Launched: 25 September 1850
- Commissioned: 17 May 1853
- Decommissioned: 2 February 1875
- Refit: 21 May 1862–30 March 1864
- Stricken: 30 May 1896
- Fate: Scrapped, 1897

General characteristics (after reconstruction)
- Type: Armored frigate
- Displacement: 3,057 long tons (3,106 t)
- Length: 214 ft 10 in (65.5 m) (p/p)
- Beam: 50 ft 10 in (15.5 m)
- Draft: 23 ft 3 in (7.1 m)
- Installed power: 1,150 ihp (860 kW)
- Propulsion: 1 shaft, 1 steam engine
- Sail plan: Barque-rigged
- Speed: 8 knots (15 km/h; 9.2 mph)
- Complement: 350
- Armament: 16 × 60-pounder guns
- Armor: Belt: 114 mm (4.5 in); Battery: 114 mm (4.5 in)

The Danish ironclad Dannebrog was an armored frigate of the Royal Danish Navy that was originally built as an 80-gun ship-of-the-line by Andreas Schifter was launched in 1850 (Note: Design plans and models of this ship can be viewed by clicking "vis" at this reference.) but was reconstructed into a steam-powered ironclad in the early 1860s. She had an uneventful career before the ship was stricken from the navy list in 1875. The ship was converted into an accommodation ship that same year and served until she became a target ship in 1896. Dannebrog was broken up in 1897.

== Description after conversion ==
Dannebrog was 214 feet 10 inches (65.5 m) long between perpendiculars, had a beam of 50 feet 10 inches (15.5 m) and a draft of 23 feet 3 inches (7.1 m). The ship displaced 3,057 long tons (3,106 t). She had a single steam engine that drove her propeller. The engine, built by Baumgarten & Burmeister, produced a total of 1,150 indicated horsepower (860 kW) which gave the ship a speed of 8 knots (15 km/h; 9.2 mph). For long-distance travel, Dannebrog retained her three masts and was barque rigged. Her crew numbered 350 officers and crewmen.

Sources disagree about the ship's armament; naval historians Paul Silverstone and Robert Gardiner say that she had sixteen 60-pounder guns, but Johnny E. Balsved shows her with a dozen 60-pounder, 88-cwt., (Note: "Cwt" is the abbreviation for hundredweight, 88 cwt referring to the weight of the gun.) guns, two 60-pounder, 150-cwt. guns, and three 18-pounder guns immediately after her conversion. All of these were rifled muzzle-loading (RML) guns. Balsved then shows that she was rearmed with six 60-pounder, 150-cwt. and eight 24-pounder guns, all RMLs, after 1865 while Silverstone gives her a later armament of six 8-inch (203 mm) and ten 6-inch (152 mm) RML guns. Dannebrog had a wrought-iron waterline armor belt 4.5 inches (110 mm) thick and her battery was protected by armor plates of the same thickness.

== Construction and career ==
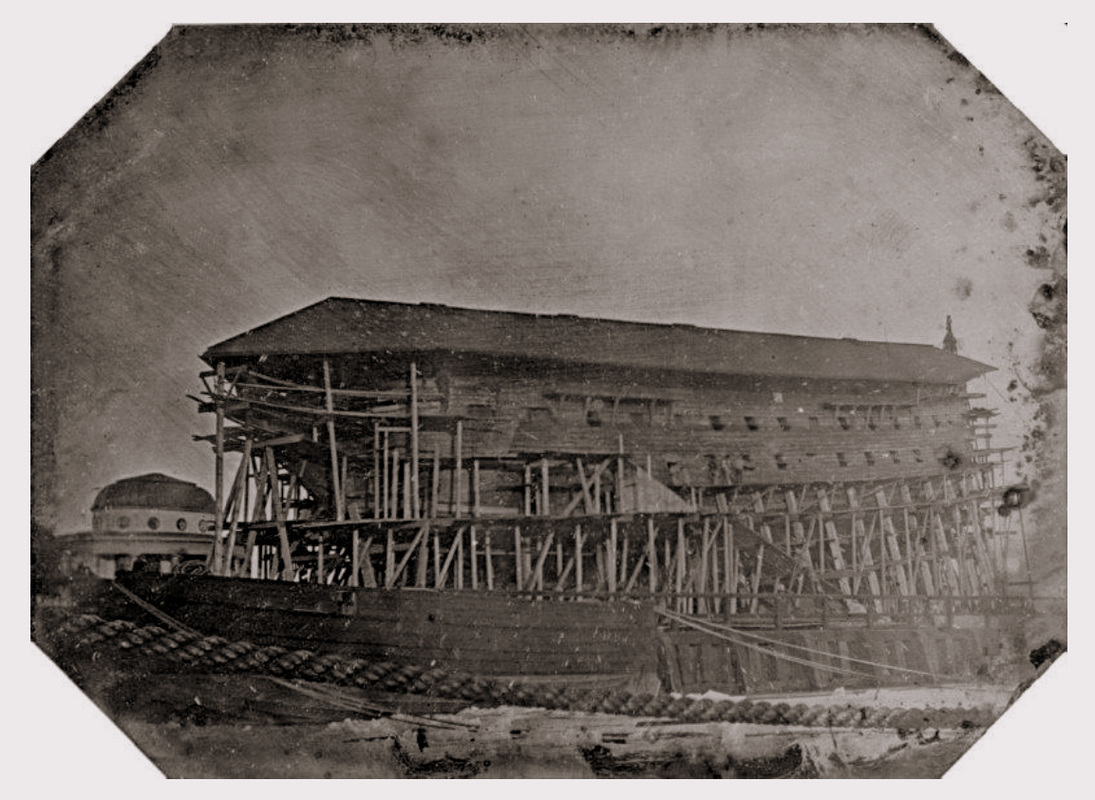
HDMS Dannebrog under construction at Holmen seen on a daguerreotype from 1849. It is the oldest photograph of a Danish naval ship.

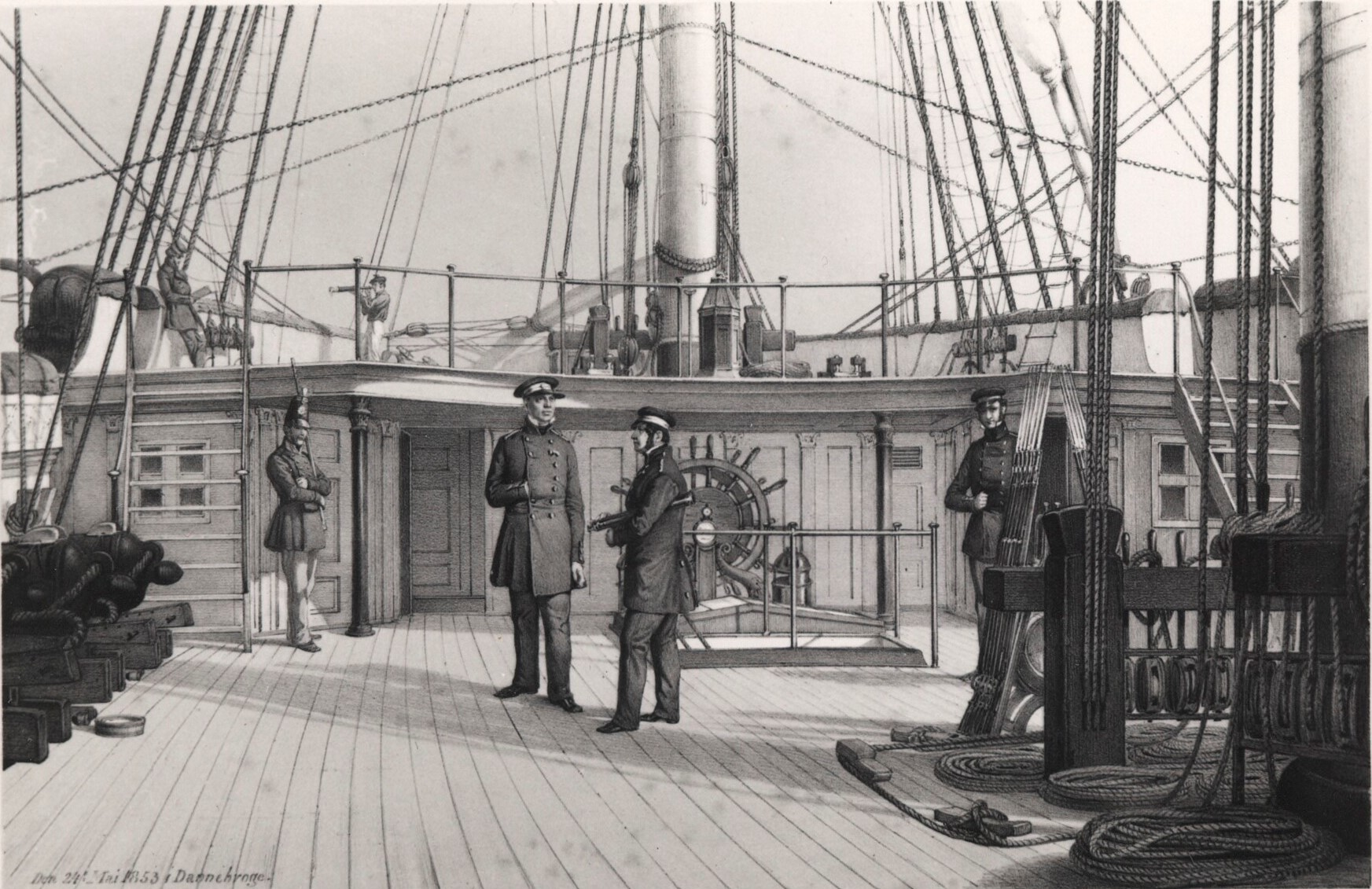
On the deck of HDMS Dannebroge, 24 May 1853

Dannebrog, named after the Danish national flag, was built by the Royal shipyard in Copenhagen as a 72-gun sail ship of the line. She was laid down on 28 April 1848, launched on 25 September 1850, and commissioned on 17 May 1856. The ship began conversion into an armored frigate on 21 May 1862 and the conversion was completed on 30 March 1864. On 14 July 1864, she ran aground off Aarhus. She was refloated the next day. Dannebrog had an uneventful career before the ship was stricken from the Navy List on 15 February 1875. The ship was converted into an accommodation ship that same year and served until she became a target ship on 30 May 1896. Dannebrog was broken up in 1897.

== Commemoration ==
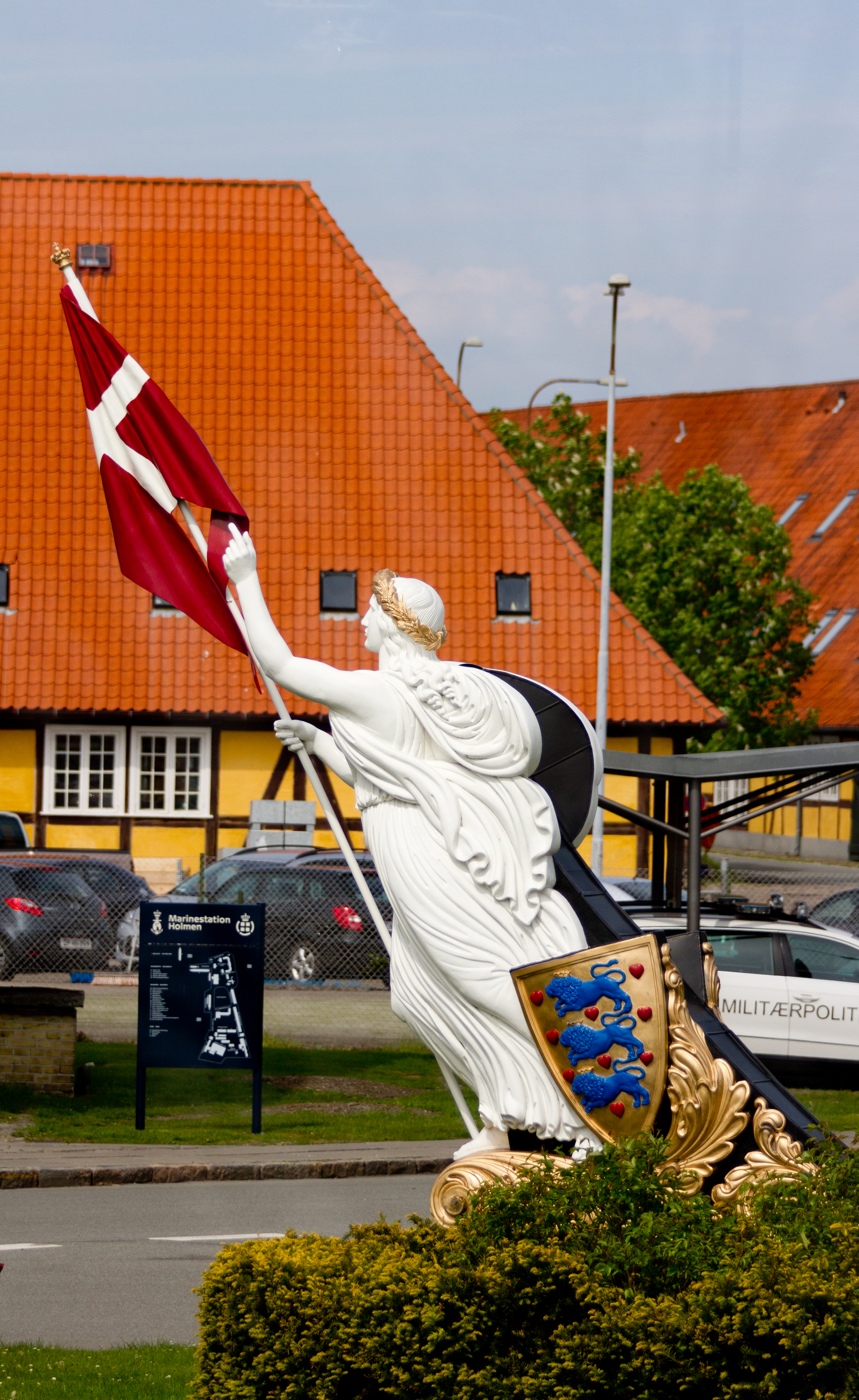
The figurehead of Dannebrog on display in Copenhagen

The figurehead of HDMS Dannebrog is now on display at the entrance to Marinestation København on Nyholm in Copenhagen. It has previously been on display in another location on the adjacent isle of Frederiksholm.

== Citations ==
- Balsved, Johnny E. "DANNEBROG (1853–1875)". Danish Naval History.
- Gardiner, Robert, ed. (1979). Conway's All the World's Fighting Ships 1860–1905. Greenwich: Conway Maritime Press. ISBN 0-8317-0302-4.
- Silverstone, Paul H. (1984). Directory of the World's Capital Ships. New York: Hippocrene Books. ISBN 0-88254-979-0.
- Royal Danish Naval Museum Database - List of Ships - Dannebrog
