= Overgaden Oven Vandet 28 =

Building in Copenhagen

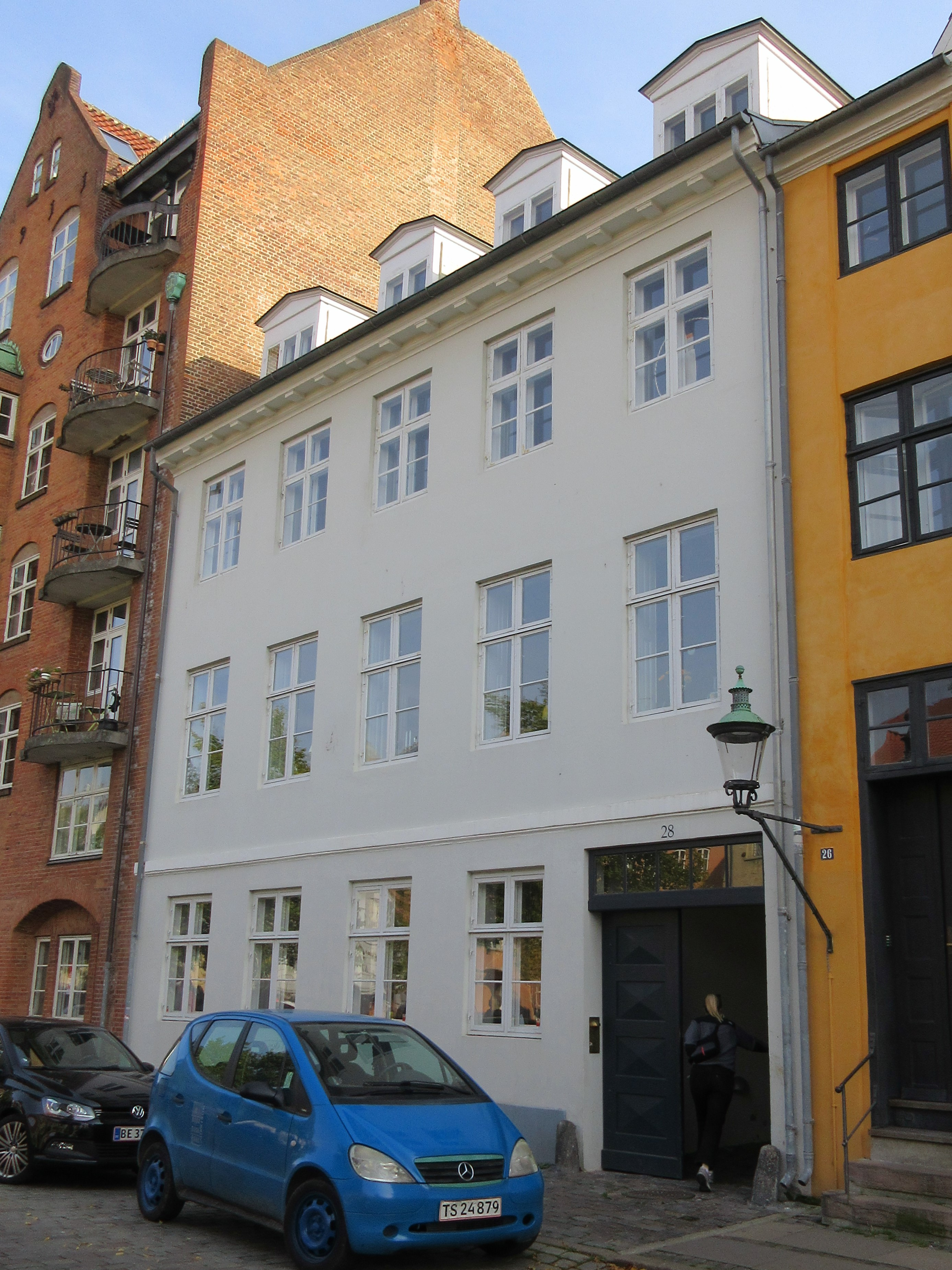
- Interactive map of the Overgaden Oven Vandet 28 area

General information
- Location: Copenhagen, Denmark
- Coordinates: 55°40′16.57″N 12°35′21.84″E
- Completed: 1780
- Renovated: 1810s

Overgaden Oven Vandet 28 is an 18th-century property overlooking Christianshavn Canal in the Christianshavn neighborhood of central Copenhagen, Denmark. It was listed in the Danish registry of protected buildings and places in 1945. Notable former residents include publisher Frederik Hegel and painter Heinrich Hansen.

== History ==
=== 17th and 18th centuries ===
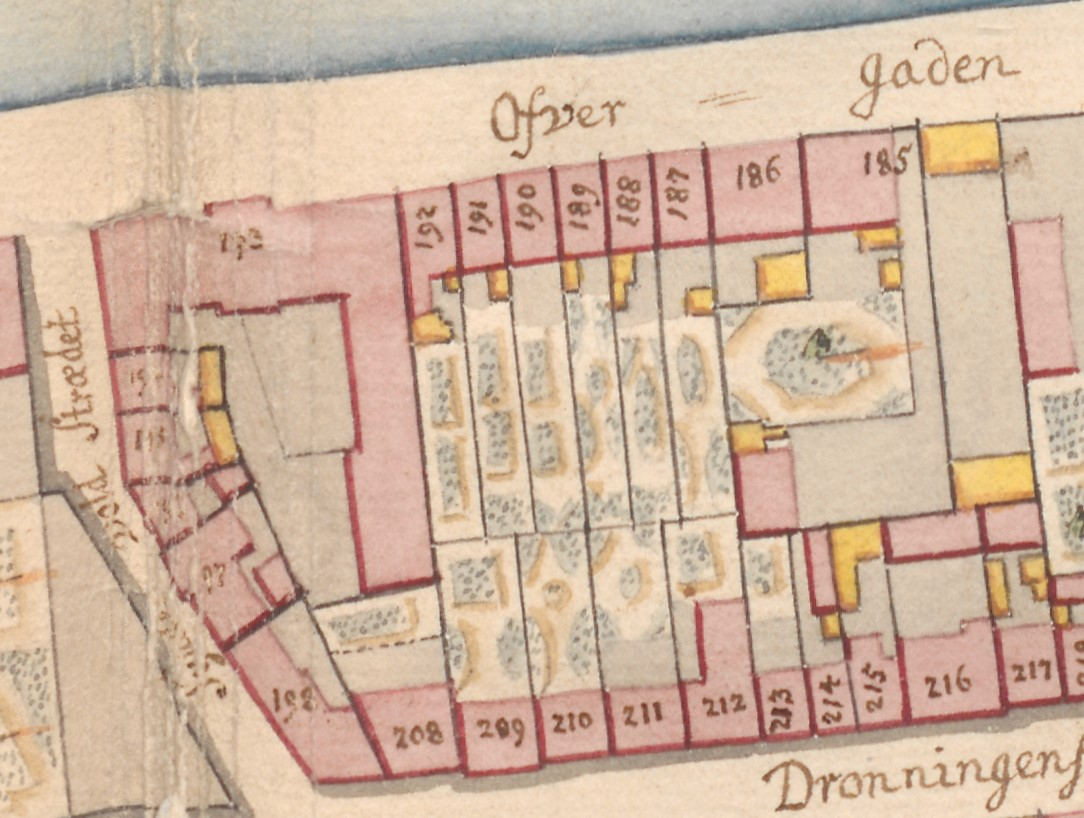
No. 186 seen in a detail from Christian Gedde's map of Christianshavn Quarter, 1757

When Christianshavn was first established, the site was part of a much larger property comprising what is now Overgaden 24–28 and Dronningensgade 17–23. This large property was ceded to mayor Knud Marquardsen in 1622. The section along the canal was first built over in 1635–1675. In 1675, it was the site of two small houses and a building with shed roof. The present building on the site was constructed sometime between 1718 and 1732 for skipper Michel Michelsen Arndt. The property was listed as No. 186 in the new cadastre of 1756, and was at that time owned by skipper Lars Larsen Bornholm. The property now known as Overgaden Oven Vandet 26–28 was listed as No. 104 in Christianshavn Quarter in Copenhagen's first cadastre of 1689, and was at that time owned by clergyman Andreas Guntzow. The property now known as Overgaden Oven Vandet was listed as No. 105 in Copenhagen's first cadastre of 1689. It was at that time owned by carpenter Anders Gudmandsen.

The property was listed as No. 184 in the new cadastre of 1756, and was at that time owned by skipper Niels Andersen Lund. The property was after Lund's death passed to his widow Mette Cathrine Lund. In December 1775, she sold the property to Thomas Potter. He had until then resided on Petter Applebye's property at the southwestern end of the canal. Potter resided in the building now known as Overgaden Oven Vandet 26 from 1775 to 1785. In 1780, he constructed the building now known as Overgaden Oven Vandet 29. In the early 1780s, he also constructed the Potter House a little farther down the canal.

The new building was subsequently referred to as No. 185A. In 1784, it was sold to the naval officer Didrich von Holsten. In 1776, he had been granted leave from the navy to captain Den lydige Sophie on a voyage to the Danish West Indies. He had later been the owner of the frigate Frederiksdal. In 1787, he captained it on a voyage to Saint Croix. The frigate had previously belonged to the half brothers Pieter van Hemert and Gysbert Behagen, the latter of whom was Holstein's father-in-law. Holstein was most likely related to Marie Christina Holsten (1749–1810), who was married to Peter Applebye Jr.

Diedrich Holsteen resided in the building with his wife Petronelle Behagen, two maids, a caretaker and a 14-year-old black boy at the 1787 census.

=== 19th century ===
In 1803, Holstein sold the property to merchant (grosserer) Rasmus Schifter (1769–1818). He was the elder brother of naval officer and ship builder at Nyholm Andreas Schifter (1779–1852) and headmistress of Døtreskolen Bolette Cathrine Schifter (1781–1825). Their younger sister Christiane Schifter (1785–1825) was on 10 August 1811 married to the industrialist Jacob Holm.

Rasmus Schifter's building was only home to one household at the 1801 census. Schifter resided in the building with his wife Anne Christine Wold, a nine-year-old daughter from his wife's first marriage, a clerk, a caretaker and a maid.

Schifter's property was listed as No. 188 in the new cadastre of 1806. In 1812, he sold it to a ship captain named Bødker.

Frederik Hegel (1817–1887), a publisher, was a resident of the building in 1935. Heinrich Hansen (1821–1890), a painter, was among the residents from 1855 to 1958.

The building was home to 12 residents om three households at the 1860 census. Frederik Carl Christian Volqvartz, a bookkeeper, resided on the ground floor with his wife Marie Lovise f. Driebein, their two-year-old son Johan Otto Anton Volqvartz (1858–1922) and one maid. Christian Nielsen, a farmer (proprietær), resided on the first floor with his wife Sylvia Nielsen, their son Emil Nielsen, his nephew Arthur Desvignes and one maid. Hans Vilhelm Riber Schøder (1811-1875), assistant pastor at the Church of Our Saviour, resided on the second floor with his wife Johanne Harder Ammichbøl and one maid.

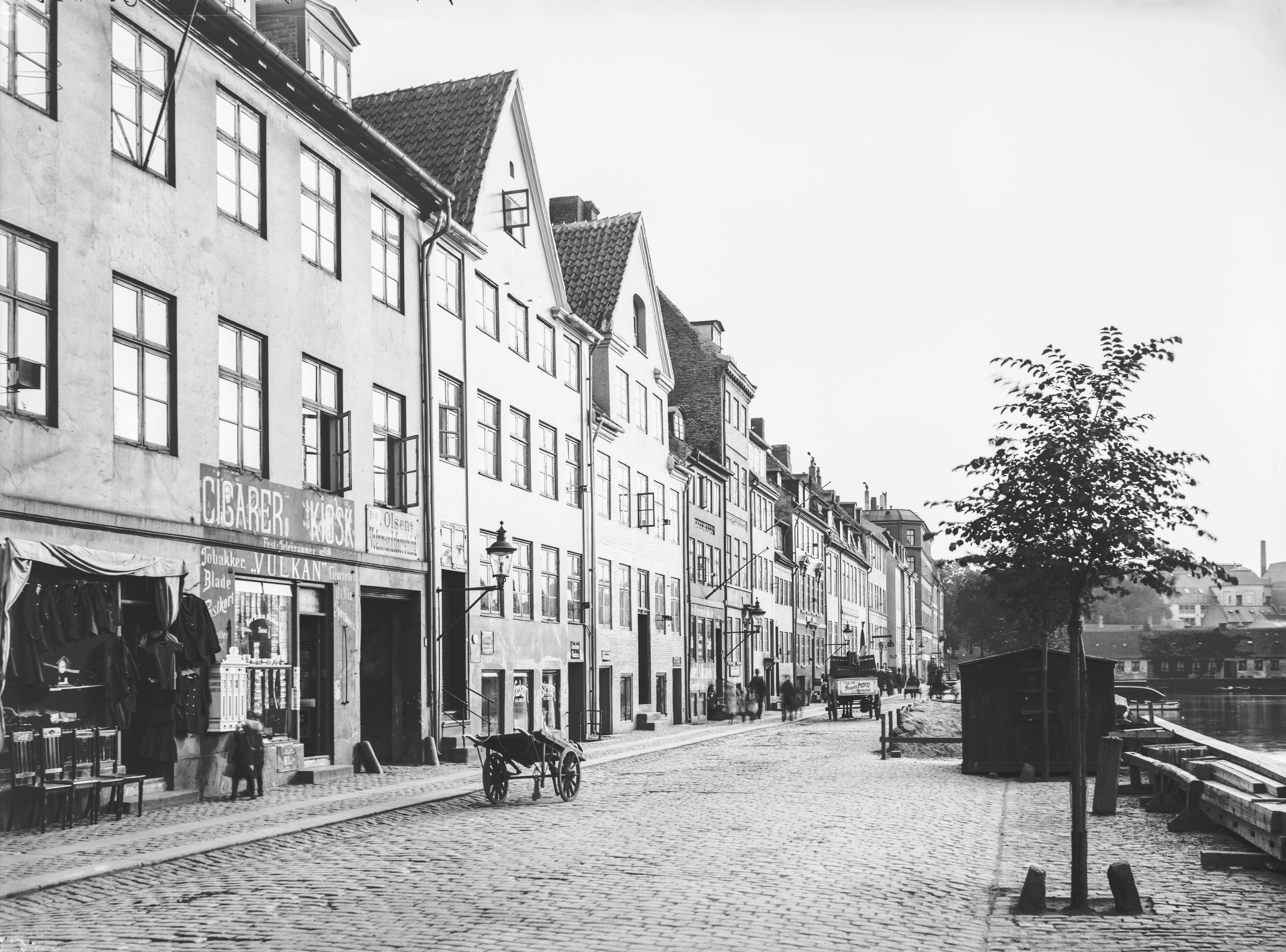
Oven Vandet 28 by Johannes Hauerslev

The number of residents had increased to 86 at the 1880 census. Johan Frederik Clement, a retailer, resided on the ground floor of the front wing with his wife Anna Margrethe Clement (née Petersen), their three children (aged four to six) and his sister-in-law Ane Hansen (née Larsen). Theodor Heinrich Hamburger, pastor at Frederick's Church, resided on the first floor with his wife Christine Frederikke Hamburger (née Mathiesen), their four children (aged 23 to 28) and one maid. Johan Anton Hansen, an inspector, resided in one of the second floor apartments with his wife Anna Vilhelmine Hansen (née Toussieng), his mother-in-law Anna Marie Toussieng (née Simonsen) and two lodgers (clerk and sailor). Jens Peter Petersen, a brewery worker (bryggerknægt), resided in the other second floor apartment with his wife Mathilde Margrethe Petersen (née Hansen) and their two daughters (aged one and six). Hans Christian Dinesen, a dyer, resided on the third floor with his wife Ingeborg Cathrine Dinesen f. Steg and their four children (aged three to 18). Peter Olsen, a sand-digger (sandgraver), resided on the ground floor of the side wing with his wife Margrethe Olsen (née Jessen) and their nine children (aged 10 to 29). Christen Andersen, a smith, resided on the ground floor of the side wing with his wife Karen Marie Andersen (née Wulff), their five children (aged two to 14) and two lodgers (workman and cooper). Julius Villiam Grøndahl, a master smith, resided on the first floor of the side wing with his wife Kirsten Grøndahl (née Nielsen), their three children (aged one to four) and one lodger (miller). Ane Elisabeth Jensen (née Lorentzen), a 55-year-old widow, resided on the first floor of the side wing with her four children (aged 14 to 28) and three lodgers (smith, smith's apprentice and goldsmith's apprentice). Johannes Alfred Hansen, a ship rigger, resided on the second floor of the side wing with his wife Nicoline Christiane Hansen (née Larsen), their four children (aged one to six) and one lodger. Oluf Emanuel Olsen Woer, a smith, resided on the second floor of the side wing with his wife Frederikke Henriette Woer (née Meyer), their six children (aged four to 26), fellow smith Jens Peter Grøndahl, Grøndahl's wife Anna Christine Grøndahl (née Johansen) and their one-year-old son. Hendrik Johansen, a workman, resided on the ground floor of the side wing to the left with his wife Nicoline Jacobine Johansen (née Junch) and their three children (aged one to seven). Jacobine Jensen (née Petersen), a 46-year-old widow seamstress, resided on the first floor of the side wing to the left.

== Architecture ==
Overgaden Oven Vandet 28 is a K-shaped building, consisting of a three-bay-tall and five-bay-wide main wing fronting the street, and a three-bay-tall and five-bay-long side wing at the rear. The facade from 1780 features a three-bay-wide slightly projecting median risalit topped by a triangular pediment. The median risalit disappeared when the front wall was made thicker in connection with a renovation undertaken by Captain Bødker in the 1810s. The plastered, white-painted facade is now finished with a belt course above the ground floor and a modillioned cornice. The pitched roof features four wall dormers towards the street. A gateway in the right-hand side of the building provides access to the courtyard. The main staircase was originally also accessed from the gateway, but in the 1779s, it was moved to the rear side of the building. The five-bay-long and two-bay-wide side wing is attached to the rear of the main wing via an inwardly canted bay.

== Today ==
The building is owned by E/F Overgaden Oven Vandet 28, and contains a single condominium on each floor.
