= HDMS Ørnen =

Several ships of the Royal Danish Navy have borne the name HDMS Ørnen (the Eagle):

- HDMS Ørnen (1694), frigate; 1694–1715
- HDMS Ørnen (1775), Royal schooner; 1775–1791
- HDMS Ørnen (1800), naval schooner; 1800-07
- HDMS Ørnen (1842), naval brig; 1842–1871
- HDMS Ørnen (1880), naval brig; 1880–1906
- HDMS Ørnen (1934), torpedo boat; 1934–1941

== See also ==
- HDMS Hvide Ørn (1798) (White Eagle), light frigate; 1798-1799
