= HNoMS Ørnen =

Two ships of the Royal Norwegian Navy have borne the name HNoMS Ørnen, after the Norwegian word for The Eagle:

- HNoMS Ørnen (1829) was a corvette launched in 1829 and scrapped in 1874.
- HNoMS Ørnen (1849) was a corvette launched in 1849 and sold in 1866.
