= Dronning Juliana Maria (1780 DAC ship) =

Danish ship

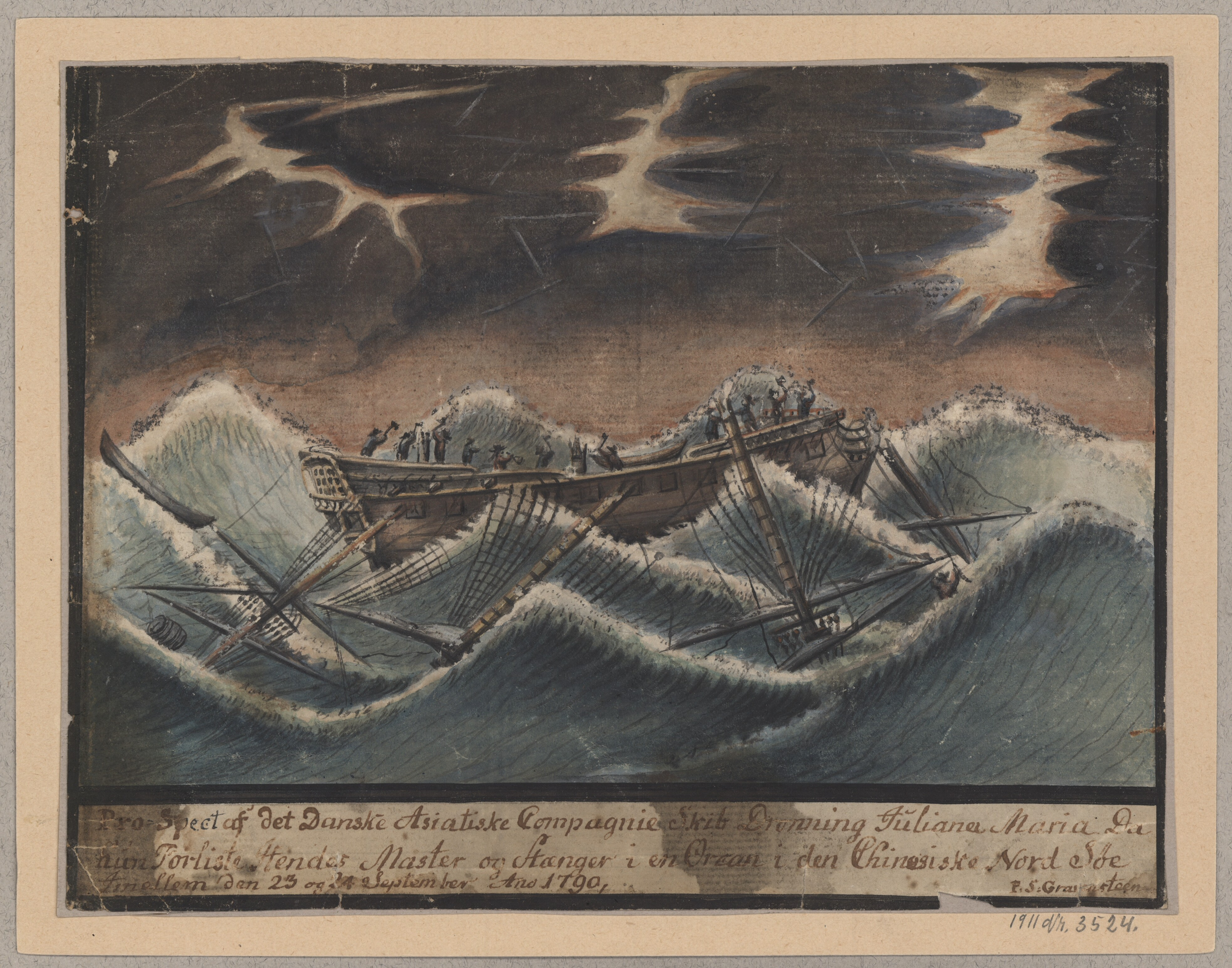
The capsizing of Dronning Juiliana Maria in the Chinese North Sea, 1790.

Dronning Juliana Maria (also spelled Dronning Juliane Maria and Dronning Juliane Marie) was a Chinaman ship of the Danish Asiatic Company, built in 1780. She was the company's third ship with this name. She sailed on four expeditions to Canton. She wrecked in the Chinese North Sea on 23–24 September 1790. Named after Juliana Maria of Brunswick-Wolfenbüttel.

== Origins ==
She was built in 1780 in Copenhagen.

== Career ==
1781-1782

She was captained by Christian Rasmussen Schifter (1741–1785) on her first expedition to Canton in 1781–1782. Her travel pass was issued in November 1780. She set sail from Copenhagen in January. Adolf Fridrich Restorff was on board the ship as a passenger.

She called at Tranquebar on 28 June 1781. The ship's protocol (kept by Schifter) covers the period 15 December 1780 – 31 August 1782.

Christian Rasmussen Schifter was the father of naval officer and ship builder at Nyholm Andreas Schifter (1779–1852), merchant (grosserer) Rasmus Schifter (1769–1818), and headmistress of Døtreskolen Bolette Cathrine Schifter (1781–1825). Their younger sister Christine was married to the wealthy businessman Jacob Holm. Christian Schifter was a close friend of the sculptor Johannes Wiedewelt. Woedewelt created a marble monument for his grave after his death in 1785.

1783-1785

She was captained by Philip Christian Fuglede (1748–1816) on her second expedition to Canton in 1783–1785. The ship's protocol (4 April 1783 – 28 July 1785) was kept by master (styrmand) Mariager.

In his diary, on 5 January 1783, Bolle Luxdorph mentions a ship, Juliana Maria, which has become dismasted during a storm in Sweden. If it is the same ship, it may have delayed her departure.

Philip Chr. Fuglede was born at Daurupgård to Councillor of Justice N. H. Fuglede. He made his first voyage to Canton on board the first Dronning Juliana Maria in 1764–66.

1786-1788

She was captained by Jesper Winther on her third expedition to Canton in 1786–1788. Ludvig Wittrog served as supercargo on the expedition. The ship's protocol (kept by Winther) covers the period 15 November 1786 – 2 August 1788.

== Fate ==
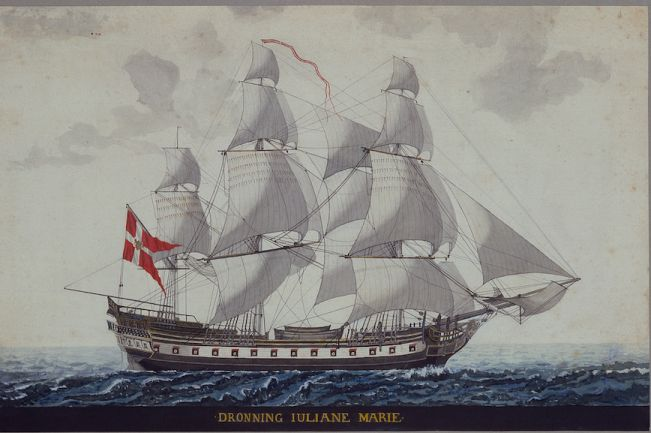
The new Dronning Juliana Maria.

Dronning Juliana Maria was captained by Jens Lassenius Kirksteen (1842–1792) on her next expedition to China. On the 23–24 September 1790, she wrecked in the Chinese North Sea. The American frigate Massachusetts was subsequently bought by the company for the return voyage. The name of the lost ship was transferred to her successor.
