= HDMS Ørnen (1842) =

Danish navy brig

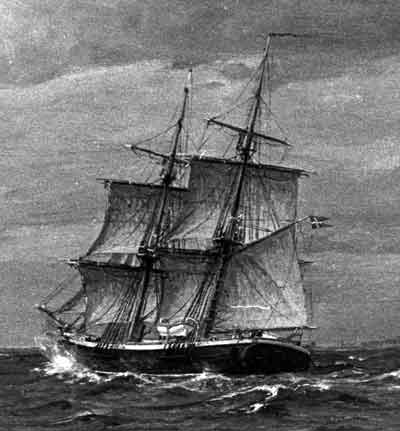
- the brig HDMS Ørnen

History

Denmark
- Name: HDMS Ørnen
- Builder: Danish Naval Shipyard, Nyholm, Copenhagen; Architect: Andreas Schifter
- Yard number: 33
- Laid down: 8 June 1842
- Commissioned: 1 May 1843
- Decommissioned: 7 December 1866
- Home port: Copenhagen
- Fate: Broken up 1871

General characteristics
- Class & type: Brig
- Length: 31.3 m (103 ft)
- Beam: 8.8 m (29 ft)
- Draught: 4.2 m (14 ft)
- Sail plan: Full rigged, 965 m^{2}
- Complement: 95
- Armament: 16 18 pound cannons

HDMS Ørnen (the Eagle) was a brig build in 1842 for the Royal Danish Navy. Ørnen played important roles during the last years Denmark maintained the African colony Danish Guinea, and in the events leading up to the emancipation of the slaves on the Danish West Indies in 1849.

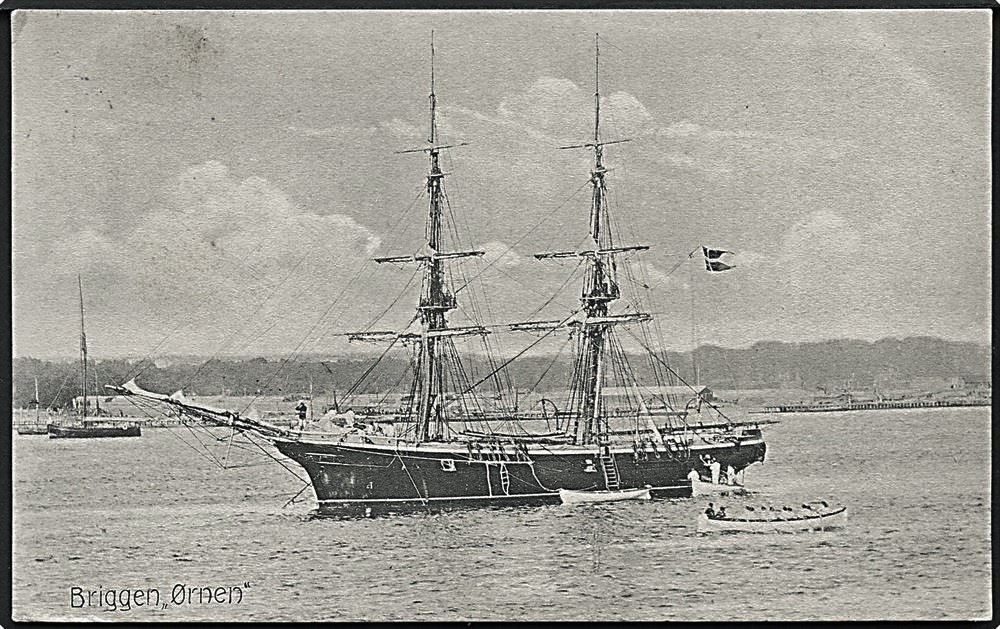
HDMS Ørnen at anchor

Ørnen's first voyage began on 5 May 1843, immediately after she entered service, under command of Andreas Chr. Polder. This voyage took her to Tangier, Gibraltar, Madeira and further on to Argentina, Uruguay and Brazil.

== First journey to Danish Guinea and the Danish West Indies 1845-46 ==
The following year Ørnen under command of lieutenant commander H.E. Krenchel, went on a voyage into the Mediterranean, along the west coast of Africa to Danish Guinea (now eastern Ghana) and further to the Danish West Indies. The visit to Danish Guinea was due to reports of illegal slave trade, religious sacrifice of two children, and rebellion. Ørnen arrived in September 1845 and took those responsible for the sacrifice, King Addum of Aquapim and his minister Sebah Akim, into custody on the ship. They were sentenced to death, later reversed to imprisonment for life. In addition, their village was burned to the ground. A landing party under command of second lieutenant Otto Chr. Hammer, conquered the fort Prinsensten, which had been taken by the rebels. Hammer also led negotiations with the king of Agna, who had taken part in the rebellion and slave trade.

After the visit to west Africa Ørnen continued to the Danish West Indies and arrived on the 6 December 1845. Once arrived, Ørnen took on board the Danish naturalist Anders Sandøe Ørsted (brother to Hans Christian Ørsted) on order from the Danish Admiralty and assisted him in his studies of the life in the deeper parts of the Caribbean. He made significant collections of marine life, down to depths of 1000 fathoms and brought the collections and sketches back home to the Zoological Museum in Copenhagen.

== Second journey to Danish Guinea and the Danish West Indies 1847-49 ==
In 1847 new unrest erupted in Danish Guinea and Ørnen, now under command of lieutenant commander Carl Ludvig Christian Irminger, was again sent to help defend the Danish forts Prinsensten and Christiansborg. After heavy fighting on land and bombardments from sea a fragile peace was negotiated and Ørnen could leave for the West Indies again. This was the last time a Danish Naval ship visited the Danish colonies in Africa. Two years later, in 1849, they were sold to the British Government for the price of 10,000 Pound sterling.

When Ørnen arrived in the Danish West Indies in November 1847 and took part in the dramatic events and rebellions that led the Danish Governor-General of the islands, Peter von Scholten, on the 3 July to declare immediate emancipation of all the slaves on the three Danish islands St. Croix, St. Thomas and St. Jan (St. John). Ørnen remained in the Caribbean until March 1949 and then returned to Copenhagen.

== First Schleswig War ==
On her return to Denmark, in 1849, in the middle of the First Schleswig War, she was immediately fitted to serve in the naval blockade of the German harbour in Danzig, still under command of Irminger. The following year Ørnen, under the command of Frederik Chr. G. Muxoll, participated together with the corvette HDMS Saga and 4 gunboats in the engagement at Fehmarn, which was occupied by the Danish troops on 17 July 1850.

== Later years ==
Between 1852 and 1858 Ørnen was stationed in the West Indies. In 1859 Ørnen, under command of Adser Enevold Ludvig Knudsen, was sent on a voyage to Iceland and Greenland. This was the first visit of a naval ship in Greenland for more than 100 years, as the last visit was by the frigate Blaa Heyren in 1736–37.

Ørnen was decommissioned in 1866 and broken up in 1871.
