= Dronning Juliana Maria (1775 DAC ship) =

1775 Danish Chinaman ship

Dronning Juliana Maria (also spelled Dronning Juliane Maria and Dronning Juliane Marie) was a Chinaman of the Danish Asiatic Company. Launched in Copenhagen in 1775, she was the second of four ship of the company with the same name. Named after Juliana Maria of Brunswick-Wolfenbüttel. She only sailed on two expeditions to Canton. Her fate is unclear. The DAC's third Dronning Juliana Maria was launched in 1780.

== Construction ==
The ship was constructed at the Danish Asiatic Company's own dockyard at Asiatisk Plads. She was designed by master shipbuilder Poul Frantzen.

== Career ==
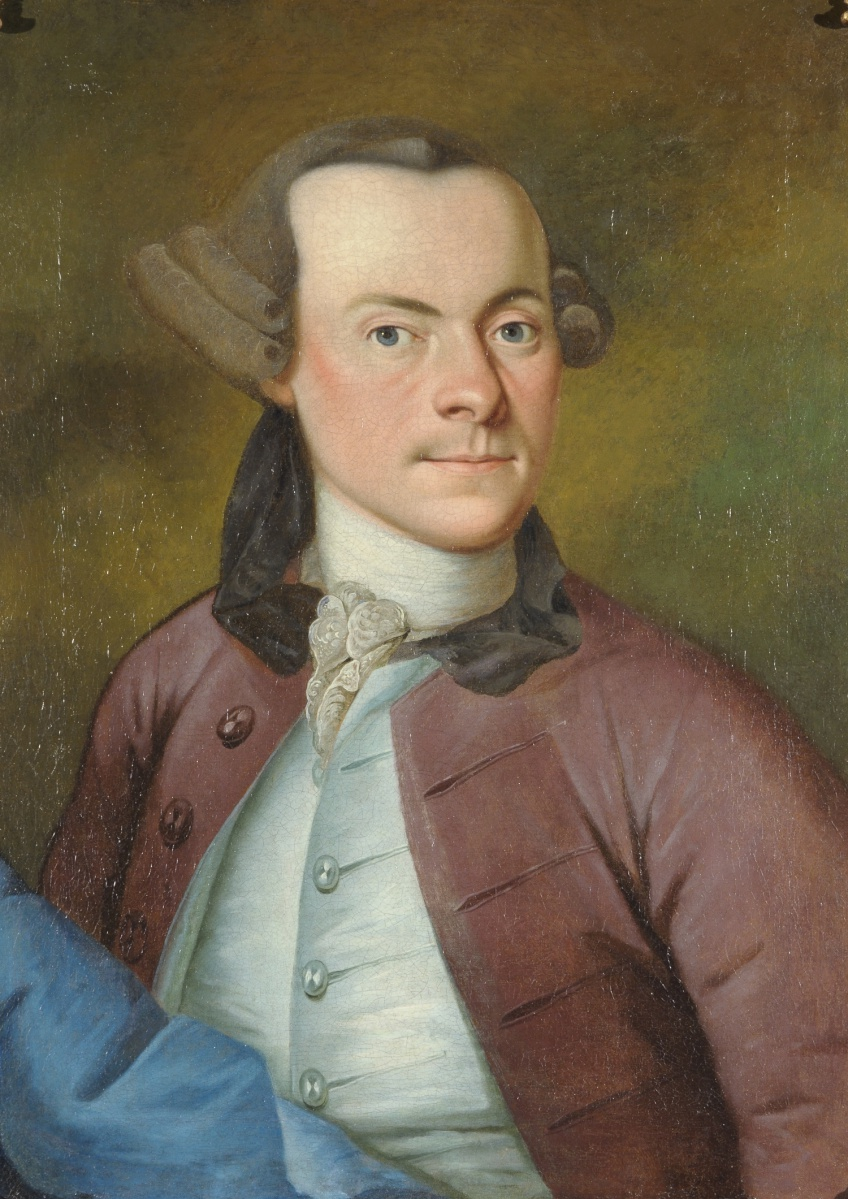
Johan Henrich Haste.

1775-1777

Dronning Juliana Maria was captained by Johan Henrich Haste on her first expedition to Canton. The ship's protocol (kept by Haste) covers the period of 9 November 1775 – 4 August 1777.

1777-1780

She set sail from Copenhagen in December 1777, bound for Tranquebar. Hermann Abbestée, Friedrich Ludvig le Fevre and Friderich Johan Peter von Lichtenstein were on board the ship as passengers. Abbestée was accompanied by his wife, three children, a governess, three maids and two servants.

The ship reached Tranquebar on 16 January 1880. She arrived back in Copenhagen in July 1780. The ship's protocol (12 November 1777 – 17 July 1780) was kept by master (styrmand) H. H. Hviid and master H. Schovert.

== Fate ==
The fate of the ship is unclear. Another Dronning Juliana Maria was launched from the Danish Asiatic Company's dockyard in 1790. The old ship was most likely sold to a private operator. A voyage is possibly mentioned in 1785.
