= Cape Melville (South Shetland Islands) =

Headland in the South Shetland Islands, Antarctica

Coordinates: 62°01′S 57°36′W

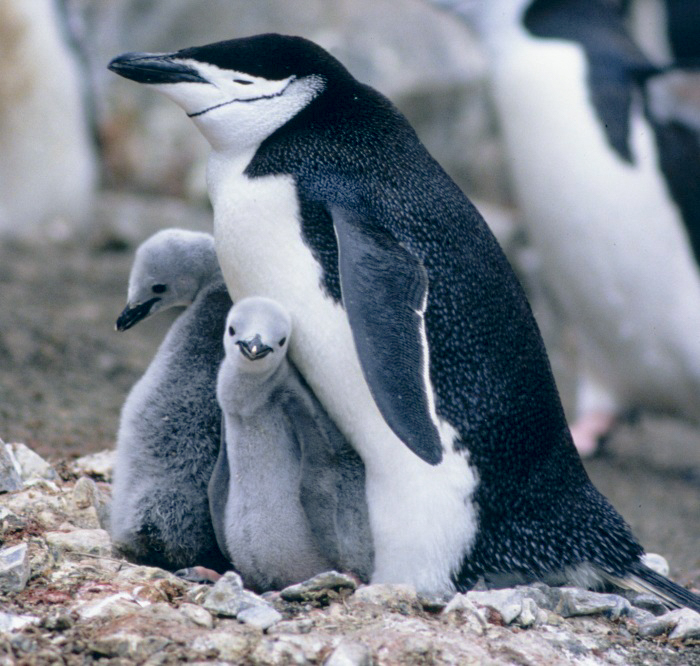
The site is important for chinstrap penguins

Cape Melville, is a low-lying, ice-free headland at the eastern end of King George Island in the South Shetland Islands of Antarctica. Some 388 ha of the site has been identified as an Important Bird Area (IBA) by BirdLife International because it supports a large breeding colony of about 16000 pairs of chinstrap penguins.

0.5 nautical miles (0.9 km) south of Cape Melville is a rock named Livonia Rock.
