= HNoMS Ørnen (1829) =

Royal Norwegian Navy corvette

History
- Name: HNoMS Ørnen
- Commissioned: 3 June 1833
- Fate: Scrapped in 1874

General characteristics
- Tons burthen: 540 tons
- Propulsion: Sail
- Complement: 158 men
- Armament: 20-18 pounder guns

HNoMS Ørnen was a Royal Norwegian Navy corvette.

Ørnen was commissioned on 3 June 1833, and her first commander was Capitaine Christian A. Bendz. The ship was used as a cadet-ship until she was refitted to serve as a lodging and guard ship in 1847.

Ørnen was scrapped in 1874.

== Sources ==
- Norwegian Navy history page
