= Livonia Rock =

Rock in the South Shetland Islands, Antarctica

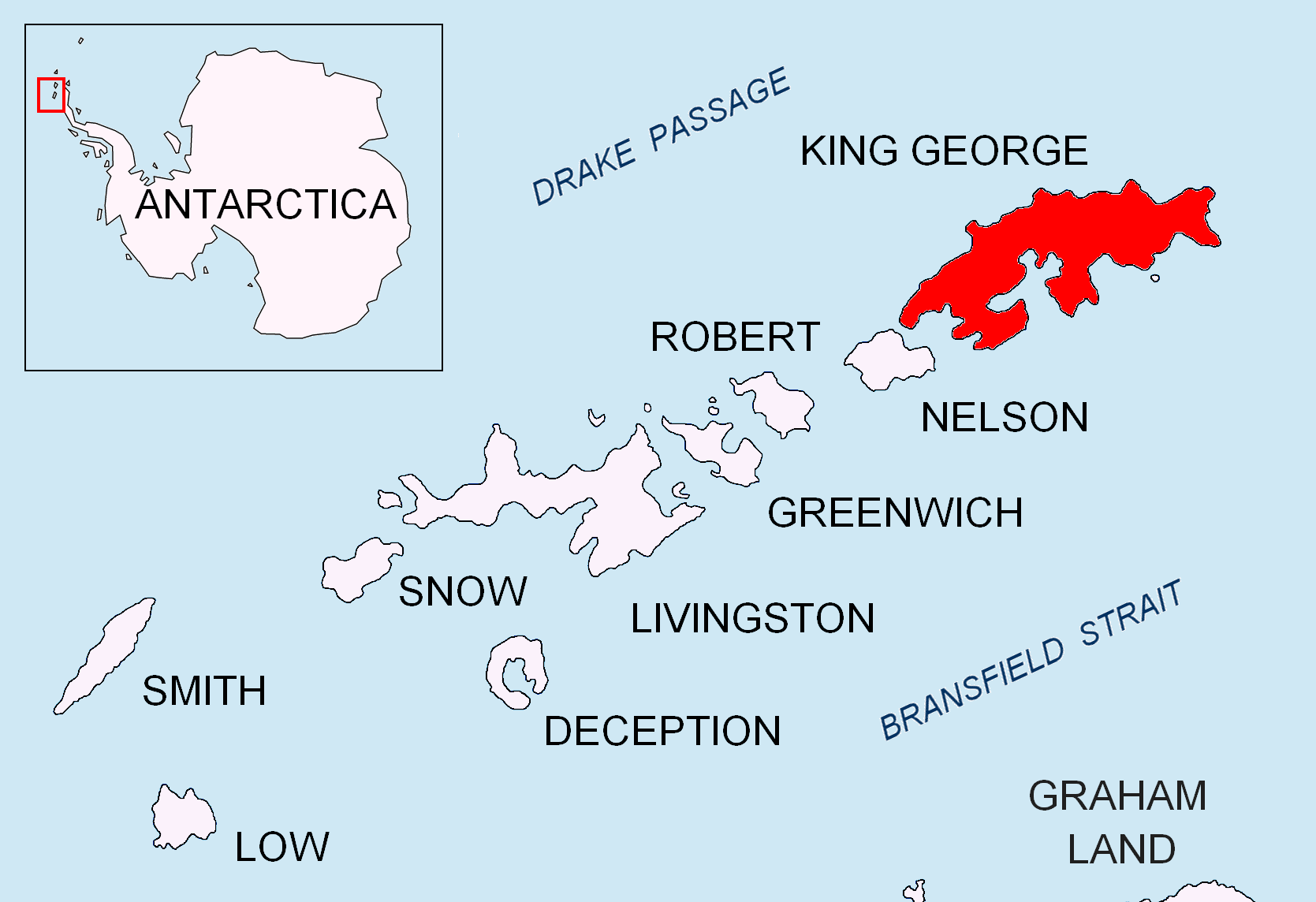
Location of King George Island in the South Shetland Islands.

Livonia Rock (62°2.43′S 57°35.8′W) is a rock lying 0.5 nautical miles (1 km) south of Cape Melville, the eastern extremity of King George Island, in the South Shetland Islands, Antarctica. It was named by the UK Antarctic Place-Names Committee in 1960 for the sealing vessel Livonia from London, which visited the South Shetland Islands in 1821–22.
