= Andreas Schifter =

Danish naval officer and shipbuilder

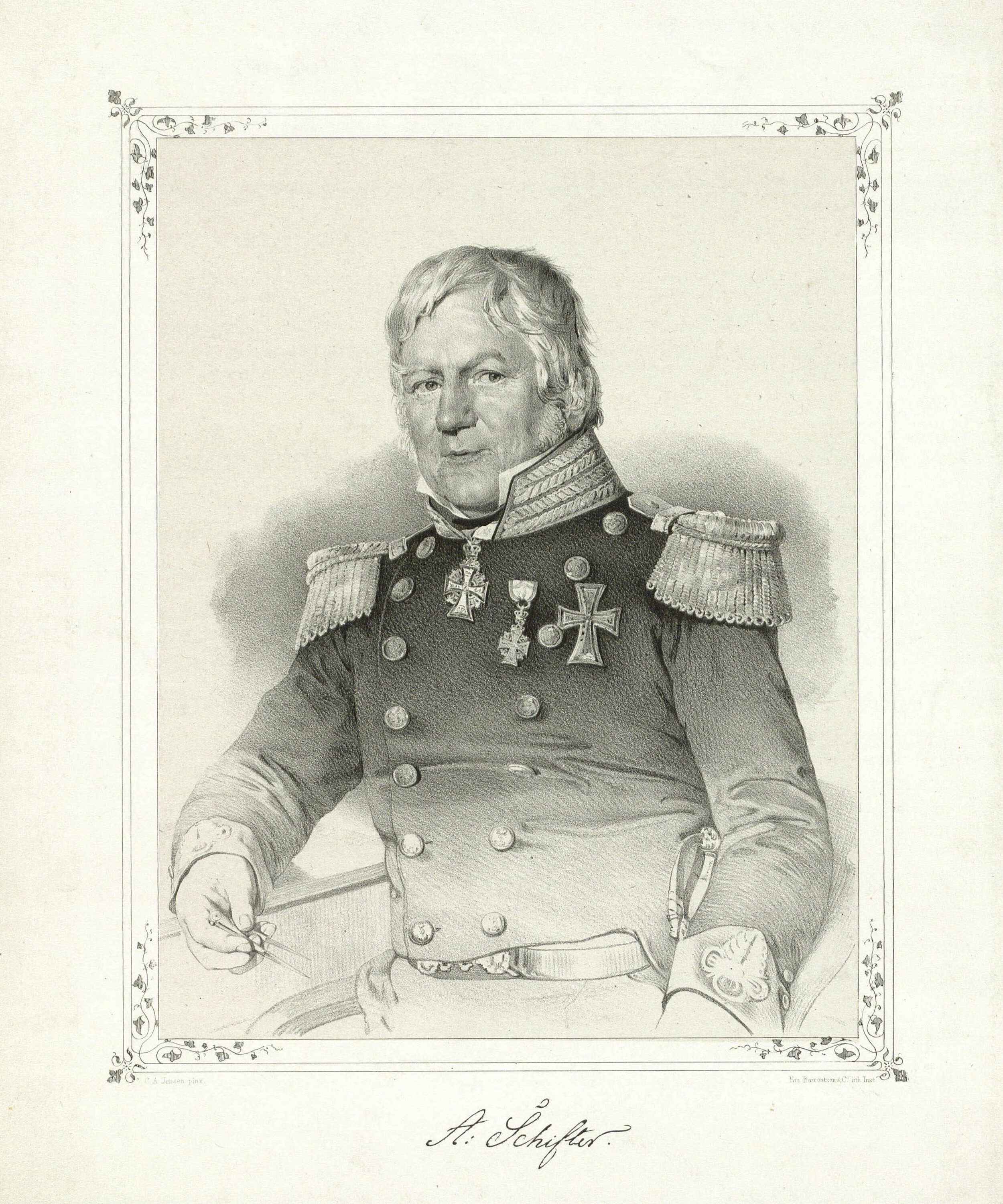
- Born: 25 August 1779; Copenhagen
- Died: 31 October 1852 (aged 73); Copenhagen
- Burial place: Holmens Cemetery, Copenhagen
- Military career
- Allegiance: Denmark
- Branch: Royal Danish Navy
- Service years: 1794–1852
- Rank: Vice-Admiral
- Conflicts: First Schleswig War

Vice-Admiral Andreas Schifter (25 August 1779 – 31 October 1852) was a Danish naval officer and shipbuilder. He oversaw the transition of the Danish navy from sail to early steam power.

== Personal ==
He was the son of Christian Schifter (1741–1785), a captain in the Danish Asiatic Company, and Karen Ibsen (1740–96). (Note: The entry in Gyldendal spells the name Schiffer. All other references supplied spell it Schifter.) His father captained the ChinamanDronning Juliana Maria on her expedition to Canton in 1781–82. He died on 28 January 1785, probably during another DAC expedition. Andreas Schifter had two elder brothers and two younger sisters. He lived with his widowed mother and four siblings in Hyskenstræde (Strand Quarter No. 38, now Hyskenstræde 10) at the time of the 1787 census.

He married, in 1803 in the Danish naval church at Holmen, Christiane Dorthea Bech – the daughter of a senior highcourt official. His younger sister Christine was married to the wealthy merchant, ship-owner and ship builder Jacob Holm.

== Career ==
As a cadet from 1794 he won the Gerner Medal for mathematics in 1797. From 1798 as junior lieutenant he progressed through the ranks to counter admiral in 1843 and vice admiral in 1851. For three years (1799 – 1801) Schifter saw service on Najaden in the Mediterranean during the war with barbary pirates. During this time, in May 1800 in Tunis, he was captured by the corsairs and received a severe head wound from a sword (Note: This claim that he was wounded and captured is made by Bjerg in Gyldendal and the Danish wikipedia article da:Andreas Schifter. Neither of the two citations Runeberg or Topsøe-Jensen bear this out, both recording that he was detained whilst negotiating with the Bey) He was held captive for three months whilst the Danes and the Bey of Tunis were negotiating release of prisoners. On his return (to Denmark) he and three other officers were nominated to study shipbuilding, but with his mathematical abilities Schifter soon outdistanced his colleagues. In 1801 he was surveying the Little Belt.

In 1803 the fabrikmester Frantz Hohlenberg resigned. At that point Schifter's studies were not yet completed, so the position of fabrikmester was left unfilled, but “reserved” for him as he became auskulant (apprentice) at the Construction Committee (Konstruktionskommissionen) in 1805.

=== Fortunes of war ===
A study tour for Schifter started in 1807 in Sweden, but here he was surprised by the outbreak of war between his homeland and Britain. He escaped to Norway and found his way back to Frederiksværn (modern day Stavern) where he became busy building gunboats and other defence works. In October 1807 he was ordered to the Duchy of Holstein, producing more gunboats, and in December was back at the naval shipyards in Copenhagen converting commercial vessels to defence ships. In 1808 and 1809 he had a very unhappy posting to the Pultusk, the French ship-of-the-line stationed in the Scheldt where in January 1809 two Danish lieutenants (Falsen and Holsten)had mutinied. (Note: Schifter was not recorded as involved in Falsen's refusal to obey orders, but he could not continue his studies there, and his opinion of his ship was that it was poorly built and of unseasoned timber! He was unwilling to report this opinion in case it was read by unauthorised persons, so he reported sick.) Eventually he was allowed to continue his educational tour to Holland, France and Italy, only returning to Denmark in 1814 where he became fabrikmester and member of the Konstruktionskommissionen.

=== Post War ===
From 1814 to 1846 he worked diligently at his post, building six ships-of-the-line, six frigates and fourteen lesser ships as well as 37 gunboats – all remarkably good ships which bore the stamp of Schifter's ability to rapidly adopt and include the new ideas he had brought with him. but without unnecessary experimentation. In 1825 he was in England studying aspects of the stern designs of warships. but he did not introduce these changes to his Danish-built ships.
At home he became a member of the Royal Danish Academy of Sciences and Letters in 1829 and was one of the leaders to establish boreholes for artesian wells on Nyholm.

=== Schifter's ships ===
The following ships-of-the-line are attributed to Schifter's designs

- Christian den Ottende (1840)
- Dannebrog (1850) - later converted to an ironclad
- Dronning Marie (1824)
- Frederik den Sjette (1831)
- Skjold (1833)
- Waldemar (1828)

It was also Schifter who designed the type of lightship that was used even many decades after his death. After another study trip to England in 1840, where he was to study steamship construction and investigate the possibility of purchasing such a one for the Danish navy, he built 3 of the Navy's earliest paddle steamers. He did not have Gerner's or Hohlenberg's genius, but he was a competent and meticulous engineer and aware of the developments within his profession.

Schifter's steamships

Four steamships are credited to Andreas Schifter

- Geiser (1844)
- Holger Danske (1849)
- Maagen (1837)
- Skirner (1847)

== Later career ==
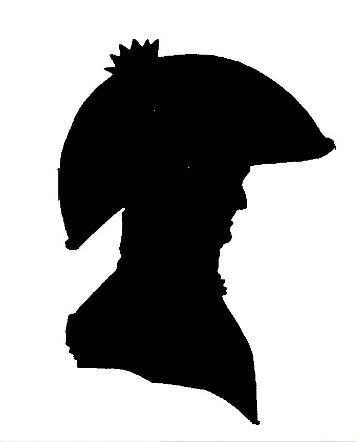
Silhouette portrait of Schifter.

With the retirement of admiral Ulrich Anton Schønheyder from the admiralty college in 1846, Schifter took over as a deputy head – a post he served for two years. He was newly advanced to second in command of the navy but left shortly afterwards to become chief of the naval dockyards (overekvipagemester ). In this position he found himself leading the naval mobilisation for the war of 1848 -50 (Schleswig Holstein Question) which involved much of the fleet that he had built. After the first Schleswig war, the now vice admiral Schifter was recalled to active duty with the fleet, but was not involved in any notable actions. He died in service on 31 October 1852. .

== Honours and memorials ==
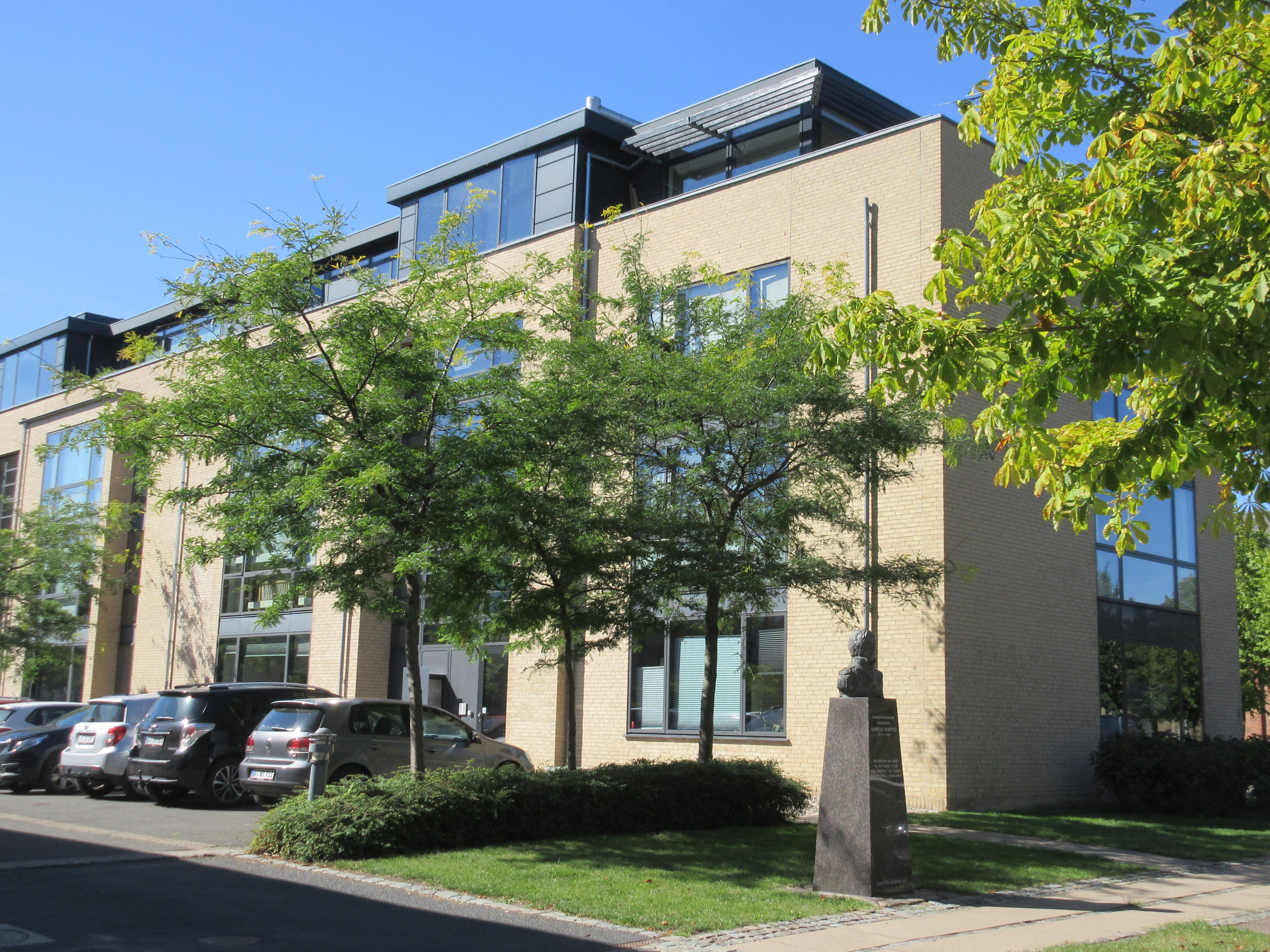
The bust of Schifter on Holmen in Copenhagen.

Schifter was created a Knight in the Order of the Dannebrog in 1822, with increasing rank in 1826 and 1836 until he was awarded the Grand Cross (Storkorset) in 1849.

In 1903, H. Grandjean instigated the publication of Schifter's autobiography in Personalhistorisk Tidsskrift.

A housing estate on Holmen from 2002 is named Schifters Kvarter (Schifter's Quarter) in his honour. In 2004, a bronze bust of him by Joseph Salamon was unveiled at the site.

A portrait of Andreas Schifter, painted by C A Jensen in 1845, was lost in a fire at Frederiksborg Castle in 1859. A copy of the painting was luckily produced as a lithograph in 1846 by Em. Bærentzen & Co. There is also a sketch by Quenedey from 1811 and a silhouette.

== Citations ==
This article is translated from the Danish Wikipedia article da:Andreas Schifter, checked and augmented against the in-line references cited.

- Bjerg H C and Topsøe-Jensen Th.: Andreas Schiffer in Dansk Biografisk Leksikon, 3 ed., Gyldendal 1979–84. Accessed 5. October 2019
- Project Runeberg: C With's "Andreas Schifter" in Dansk biografisk Lexikon / XV. Bind. Scalabrini - Skanke / pp 120 - 121
- Royal Danish Naval Museum website for all warships attributed to a named shipbuilder. From the website follow Database > Avancerede > Set Konstructør to Schifter > Søg (This works only if the language is set to Danish). For particular types of ships, follow the same path, but set the filters accordingly.
- Royal Danish Naval Museum - List of Danish Warships
- Royal Danish Naval Museum - Skibregister for individual ship's record cards where they exist.
- Topsøe-Jensen T. A. og Emil Marquard (1935) “Officerer i den dansk-norske Søetat 1660-1814 og den danske Søetat 1814-1932“. Two volumes. (Danish Naval Officers)
