= Juliana Maria of Brunswick-Wolfenbüttel =

Queen of Denmark and Norway from 1752 to 1766

- Juliane Marie as queen dowager at the height of her influence by Vigilius Eriksen, 1776

Queen consort of Denmark and Norway
- Tenure: 8 July 1752 – 14 January 1766
- Coronation: 8 July 1752
- Born: 4 September 1729; Wolfenbüttel
- Died: 10 October 1796 (aged 67); Fredensborg Palace, Denmark
- Burial: Roskilde Cathedral
- Spouse: Frederick V of Denmark (m. 1752)
- Issue: Frederick, Hereditary Prince of Denmark
Names
- Juliane Marie
- House: Welf
- Father: Ferdinand Albert II, Duke of Brunswick-Wolfenbüttel
- Mother: Duchess Antoinette of Brunswick-Wolfenbüttel
- Religion: Lutheran

Juliana Maria of Brunswick-Wolfenbüttel-Bevern (Danish: Juliane Marie; 4 September 1729 – 10 October 1796) was Queen of Denmark and Norway from 1752 to 1766 as the second consort of King Frederick V of Denmark and Norway. She was mother to the prince-regent, Hereditary Prince Frederick of Denmark and Norway, and was herself de facto regent from 1772 to 1784. King Christian VIII of Denmark and every subsequent Danish monarch excluding Christian IX descends from her.

== Life ==
=== Early life ===
Duchess Juliana Maria of Brunswick-Wolfenbüttel was born on 4 September 1729 in the town of Wolfenbüttel, the residence of the Brunswick Princes of Wolfenbüttel. She was the 11th child and 6th daughter of the Austrian field marshal Duke Ferdinand Albert of Brunswick-Wolfenbüttel and Antoinette Amalie of Brunswick-Wolfenbüttel. At the time of her birth, her family constituted the princely cadet line of Brunswick-Wolfenbüttel-Bevern, but after the death of his cousin and father-in-law Louis Rudolph in March 1735, Ferdinand Albert inherited the Principality of Wolfenbüttel and resigned as field marshal. However, he died unexpectedly just six months later.

Among her many siblings were Duke Charles I of Brunswick-Wolfenbüttel, Duke Anthony Ulrich, spouse of the Russian regent Anna Leopoldovna, and Duchess Elisabeth Christine, wife of Frederick the Great of Prussia. Like her siblings, Juliana Maria was given the simple but very strict upbringing usual at many of the smaller princely German courts. As a child, she appears to have stuttered, as did several other members of the house of Brunswick.

=== Marriage ===
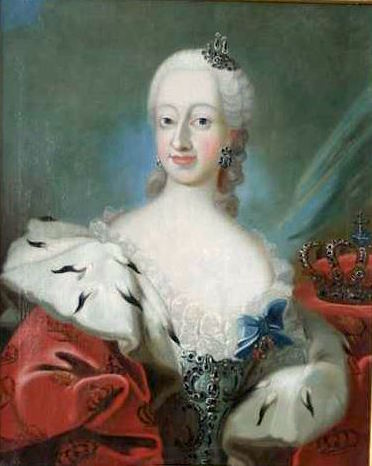
Juliane Marie portrayed in her official role as queen wearing the Ordre de l'Union Parfaite.

In 1752, a dynastic marriage was negotiated between Juliana Maria and King Frederick V of Denmark and Norway who had lost his first wife Louise of Great Britain the previous year. The marriage was arranged by the king's favourite, the powerful lord chamberlain Count Adam Gottlob von Moltke, who thought it best that the king remarried as soon as possible, in an attempt of stabilizing his behavior. The marriage did not come about on the best terms: The king was initially unwilling to remarry a foreign princess, unless it was with a British princess, none of whom were available at the time. Reportedly, in 1751-52 the king had a wish to marry Moltke's own daughter, maid-of-honor Catharine Sophie Wilhelmine von Moltke, a match Adam Gottlob did not wish and prevented by quickly having her married to Count Hannibal von Wedell-Wedelsborg. Moltke then drew the king's attention to Juliane Marie. After having seen a portrait of Juliana Maria, and after having made some additional investigations and met with satisfying answers, the king expressed himself willing to marry her.

The wedding was celebrated on 8 July 1752 at the chapel of Frederiksborg Palace, just a little more than six months after the death of the king's first wife, with Juliana Maria being crowned the same day. She was given a household headed by queen Louise's old chamberlain Carl Juel and head lady-in-waiting Christiane Henriette Louise Juel. The wedding was celebrated by a number of court festivities on the royal palaces around North Zealand during the following summer months, but "among the common men the mood was more still, as this seems to them to be so sudden after the mourning of Queen Louise".

=== Queen Consort ===
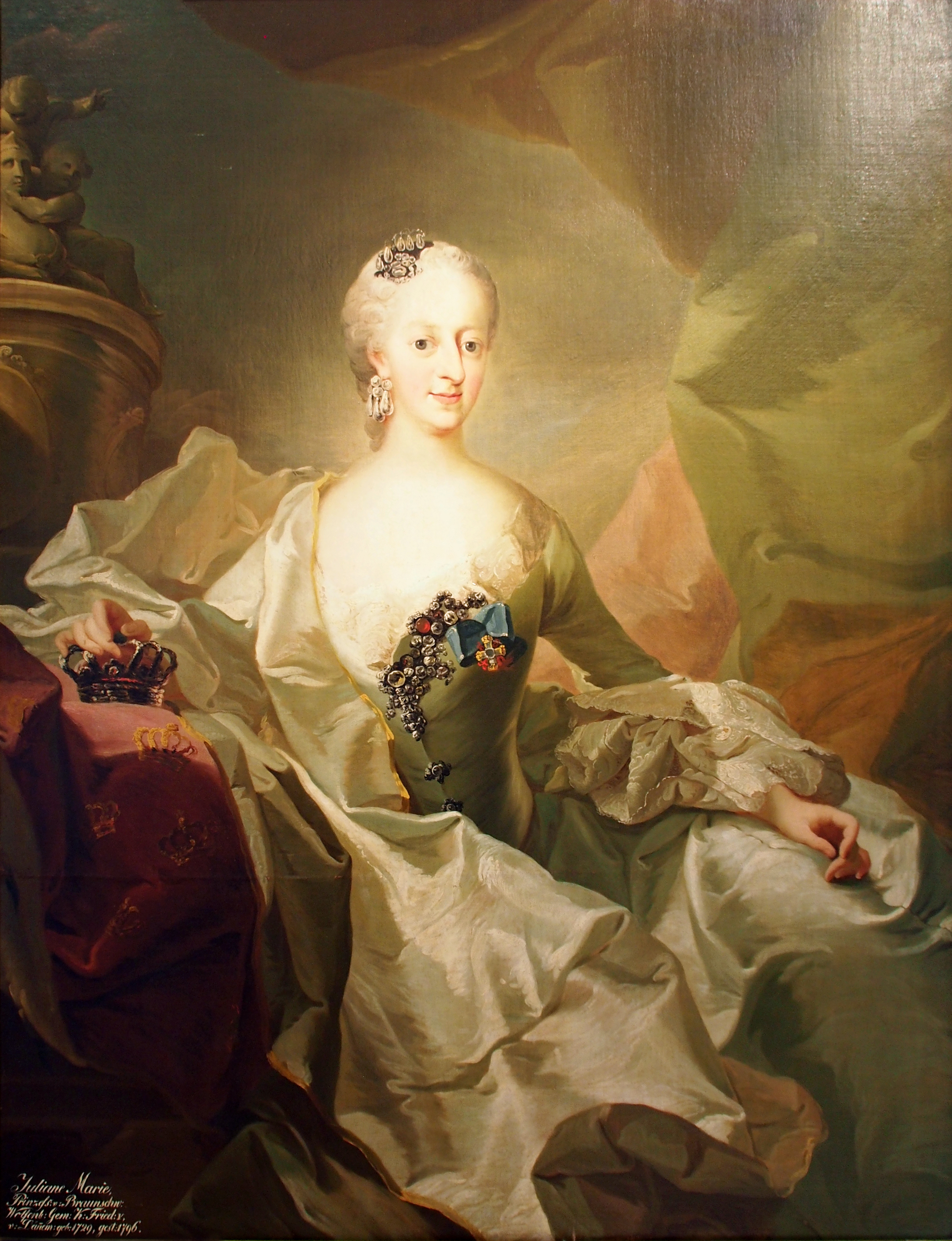
Portrait of Queen Juliane Marie by Carl Gustaf Pilo, c. 1750 (Celle Castle).

Queen Juliana Maria was described as shy, reserved and somewhat stuttering when first introduced to the Danish royal court as its new queen; having been given a strict education, she submitted to fulfill her duty as the second queen of Frederick V and the stepmother of his children, but reportedly felt uncomfortable at the situation and the pressure put upon her in her new role. Juliana Maria was personally described as good-looking and sensible, but the marriage was not popular in Denmark, where it was considered to have taken place too soon after the death of her predecessor, the popular queen Louise, and it was a difficult task for her to replace her popular predecessor.

Despite the constant infidelity of King Frederick V, she was regarded to have illustrated an ideal of a spousal duty, accepting his infidelity without complaint and nursing him during his illnesses, such as during his illness in 1760 and his final illness in 1765–66, which ended in his death. She reportedly nursed him in parallel with his long-term-mistress Charlotte Amalie Winge. She noted each day of his progressing illness in her diary, and upon his death, she referred to him as "le meilleur des rois".

She had several stepchildren by marriage, but she was given no influence over their upbringing. She did exchange visits with them, and referred to her stepchildren as "My daughters", "My son", "My children" and "The Good Children", and her diaries are full with notations of how she spent time with them. On 4 August 1760, for example, she noted "The dear crown prince visited Hirschholm for the first time after his illness", and on 8 October 1766, she accompanied her stepdaughter Sophia Magdalena of Denmark when she departed for Sweden for her wedding to the Swedish crown prince: "The queen [queen dowager] and I left for Kronborg, to which Sophie Magdalene and the rest of the family had arrived the previous day, and eleven o'clock, the good child embarked and sailed across the water, and the king, the queen and the family returned to Fredensborg". Her relationship with her mother-in-law Queen Dowager Sophie Magdalene, was a close one, and the two queens often visited each other and spent time together.

While she had no influence upon the upbringing of her stepchildren, she was given much freedom in the education of her own son, and had two Danes in succession, J. Schielderup Sneedorff and Guldberg, appointed governors responsible for the tutelage of her son, Hereditary Prince Frederick, who thereby became the first Danish prince in generations to speak the Danish language as his mother tongue. Her selection of Tyge Rothe, J. S. Sneedorff and O. H. Guldberg were to have great significance later on: her son's tutors were all members of the Danish patriotic movement, and particularly Guldberg is known to have influenced her to a point where she eventually became the leader of this court faction during her time as queen dowager. While she lacked all influence in politics, as her own son progressed in age, she reportedly came to the conclusion that he would be more suitable as ruler than her stepson, the crown prince.

Juliana Maria was not mentioned much during her years as queen consort, and it was mainly noted that she lived a quiet life devoting herself to domestic duties and family life and considered honorable and virtuous but insignificant. While Frederick V was notorious for his drunken parties and debauched life style, these parties did not take place at court, and the court life of Juliana Maria was by contrast described as completely correct. Her diary as queen describe a number of days dominated by a quiet family life exchanging visits with members of the royal family, illustrated by one line: "Everything was as yesterday." She did her best to accustom herself to Denmark and make herself popular as queen, and although she never fully mastered the Danish language, she frequently used it both in speech and writing. Despite these efforts, she never managed to make herself a popular queen.

Queen Juliana Maria had nothing to do with the affairs of state whatsoever while her husband was still alive. Her brother-in-law, Frederick the Great, had encouraged her marriage and expected her to act as his agent in Denmark and help him to remove Count Johann Hartwig Ernst von Bernstorff from his position, but she never participated in any such thing. She corresponded with her sister, Elisabeth Christine of Prussia, through which she eventually came to correspond with Frederick the Great himself during her tenure as queen dowager; however, while she expressed to her sister that all of Denmark were admirers of Frederick the Great, there are no letters from her to him prior to 1772.

On 14 January 1766, Frederick V died and was succeeded by Juliana Maria's stepson Christian VII.

=== Queen Dowager ===
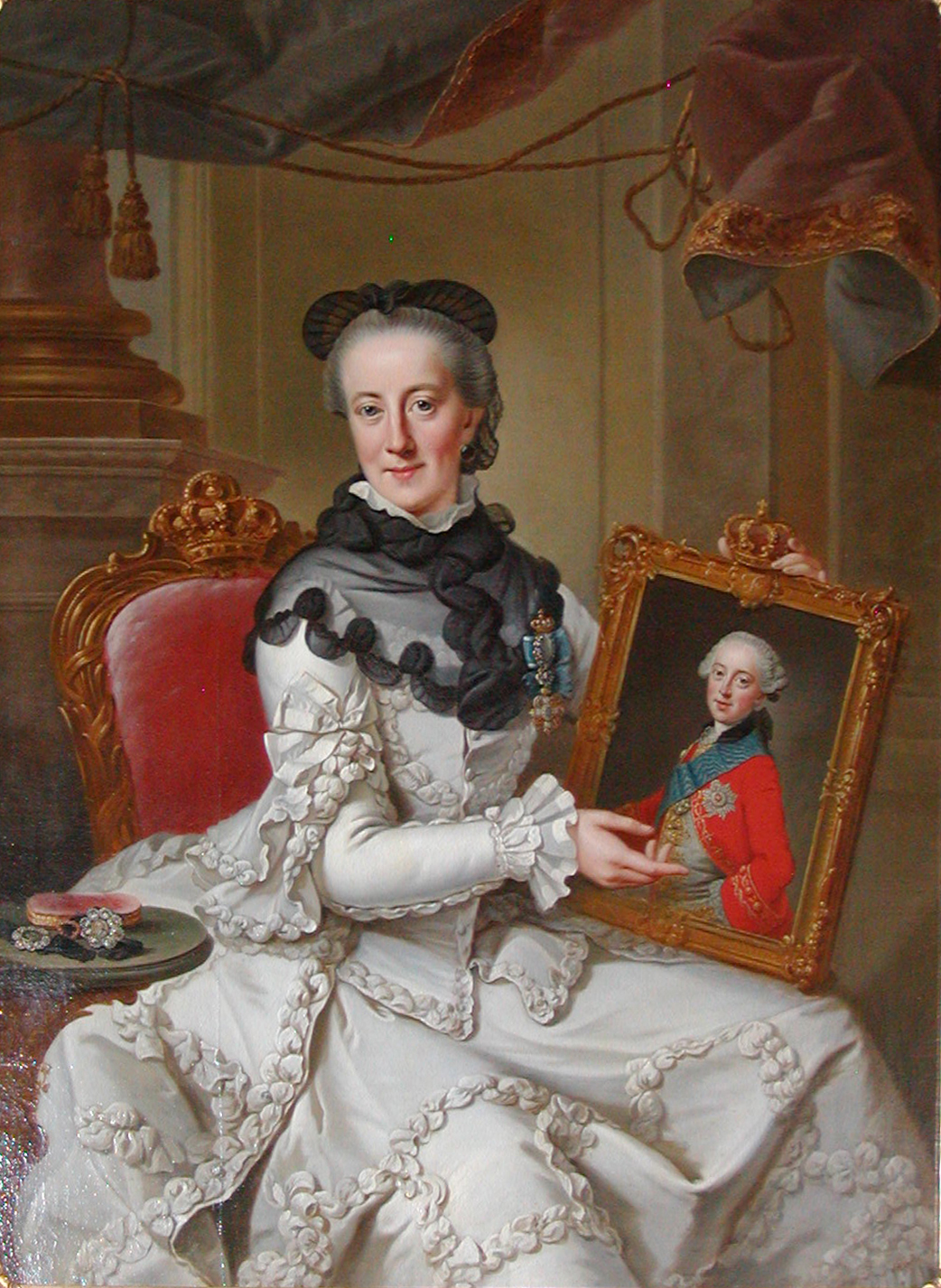
The Queen Dowager showing a portrait of her only son hereditary prince Frederick by Johann Georg Ziesenis.

A series of events resulted in Juliana Maria becoming the de facto ruler of Denmark-Norway six years after being widowed. Her stepson king Christian VII rejected her attempts to make contact with him, as did his spouse, Caroline Matilda of Great Britain. It was noted how the younger of the two queen dowagers were neglected by the royal couple: despite the fact that Juliana Maria's summer residence Fredensborg Palace was but a short distance from summer residence of the king and queen, Hirschholm Slot, she was never visited by them; she was only invited to the royal table when it was absolutely necessary, and at those occasions, she was markedly ignored, which demonstratively placed her in a neglected position at court. Nevertheless, it is noted that the queen and the two queen dowagers spent a lot of time together during the king's journey in 1768–69, and that Juliana Maria was given the Mathildeordenen and carried Princess Louise Augusta to her baptism in 1771.

Her position as visibly neglected by the royal couple made her a natural center for the opposition. In 1768, she participated in the banishment of the king's mistress Støvlet-Cathrine, who was believed to have influence over the king. By 1770, her stepson King Christian VII, had become insane and the power had fallen in the hands of his consort Caroline Matilda of Great Britain and her lover Johann Friedrich Struensee. They had liberal political views and issued a series of democratic reforms that raised the opposition to the nobility.

In January 1772, Queen Caroline Matilda, Johann Friedrich Struensee and Enevold Brandt were arrested and their rule ousted in a palace coup led by the opposition under Juliana Maria's confidante Ove Høegh-Guldberg. While she is not believed to have been the instigator of the coup, Guldberg approached her and convinced her to participate to protect Denmark-Norway, and her role was vital to bring the palace coup to fruition. On 17 January, Juliana Maria convinced the mentally unstable monarch to sign the arrest order of the queen, Struensee and Brandt, thereby effectively bringing about a coup. The order was in fact signed after the arrests had already been securely made in the name of the king, legitimizing the acts. In April, Struensee and Brandt were executed, and Caroline Matilda was exiled.

Juliana Maria was hailed in the press, in pamphlets and poems as the leader of the coup and favorably compared to Esther, Deborah, and Judith. The opposition, on the other hand, produced criticism in Germany referring to her as a devil and the cause of all misfortune of Denmark. The king was made to sign a letter thanking her for having "saved" him.

=== Regency of 1772-1784 ===
The son of Juliana Maria, Hereditary Prince Frederick, was formally made regent for the mentally incapacitated monarch, but his rule was nominal. Formally, Juliana Maria had no official position, as the constitution did not specify the rules of a regency in the case of the incapacity of an adult king, and there were no laws as to how such a regency should be conducted. In the first period after the coup, she openly attended the assembly of the royal council, but was dissuaded from doing so as this was not in accordance with royal law. In reality, however, Juliana Maria was universally and openly recognized as de facto ruler of the regency, aided by Ove Høegh-Guldberg. She corresponded with Frederick the Great, who was her supporter and who referred to her as the Regent of Denmark.

The policy of Juliana Maria and Ove Høegh-Guldberg was described as one of reactionary conservatism. She restored the privileges of the nobility, and was regarded by them as the heroine of the aristocracy and the savior of their privileges. She is remembered for having founded a porcelain factory, which was created royal factory of the state in 1779, today known simply as Royal Copenhagen. The crown of her regency is regarded the Law of Indigenous Rights of 1776, which prohibited foreigners from holding public office.

Juliana Maria described her life in 1775, in the middle of her regency:

"My days go by pleasantly. My sons shows me their tender affection in every way. The king, who from his earliest youth has favored me, continues to view me as his support, as he has done from his childhood and under all the misery which has befallen him since. My son the prince, who has never displeased me, who has always fulfilled all the requirements of a god son and an honest man, considers no act other than what I wish; thus he act toward me, and such is his eagerness to serve his king and his fatherland. The little crown prince gives good promise and have more understanding than one would imagine, about how great kindness that was shown toward him during the last revolution."

She commented that the ministers worked efficiently and that, concerning the regency government, "everything is done as a good and well tended clockwork, and without alarm or fuss at that".

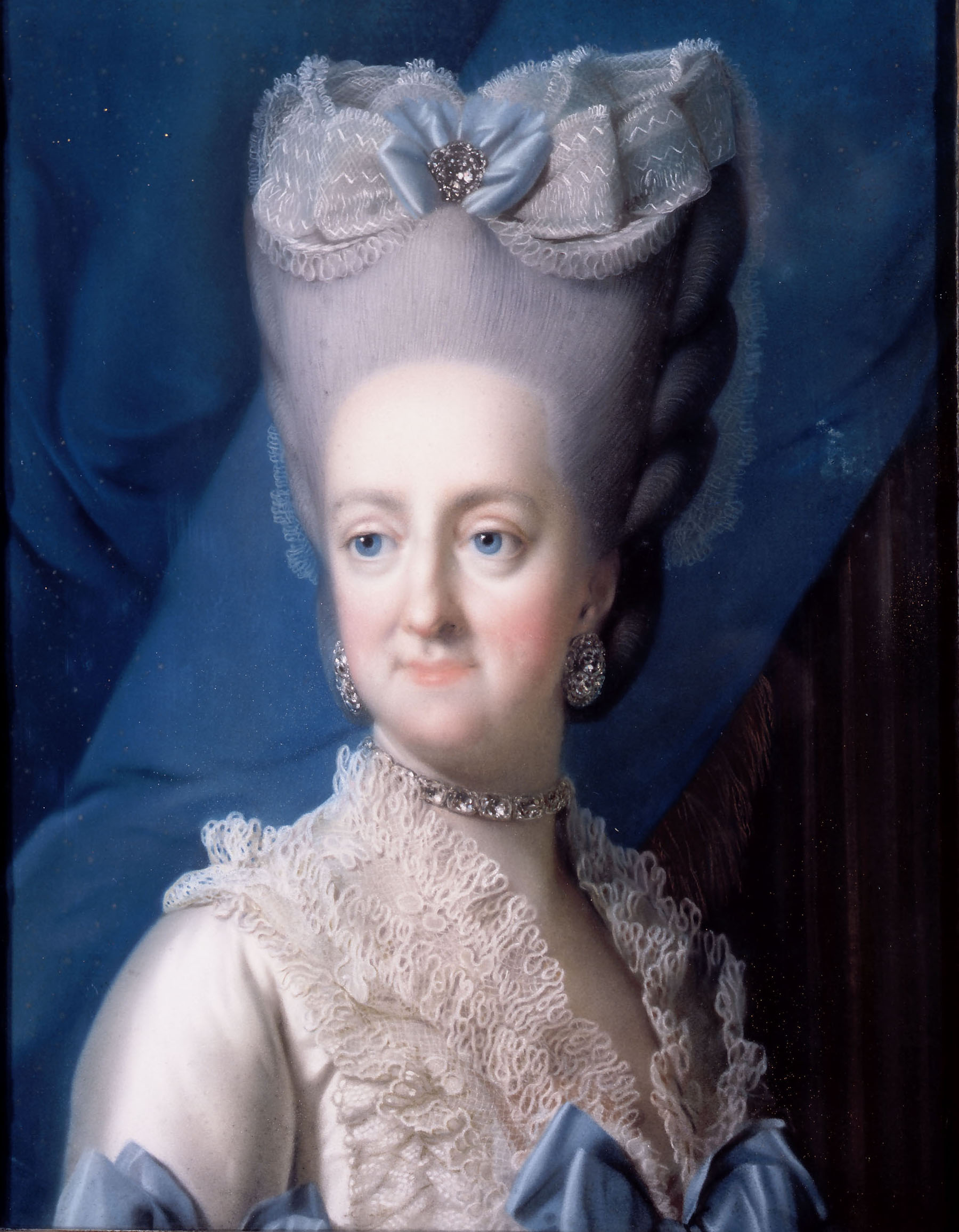
Juliana Maria of Brunswick-Wolfenbüttel

Among the influential favorites of her reign was her lady-in-waiting Margrethe von der Lühe, her kammarfrue Sophie Hedevig Jacobi (married to the king's reader Christian Frederik Jacobi), her secretary Johan Theodor Holm and crown prince Frederick's governor Professor Sporon.

On 30 June 1780, she gave refuge to her nephews and nieces: the children of her brother Duke Anthony Ulrich of Brunswick and the Russian regent Anna Leopoldovna, siblings of the deposed Czar Ivan VI of Russia, when they were released from Russian captivity. Upon an agreement with Catherine the Great, she received Catherine (1741–1807), Elizabeth (1743–1782), Peter (1745–1798) and Alexei (1746–1787), who were born in captivity, and let them live the rest of their lives in comfortable house arrest in Horsens. The siblings were kept under the responsibility of Juliana, and on the financial support of Catherine.

Juliana Maria was given the responsibility of the upbringing of the crown prince, Frederick VI, and his sister Louise Augusta. The crown prince greatly disliked her, because she attempted to form him to be in favor of her regency, and because she (unsuccessfully) tried to separate him from his sister, who was his closest friend. In 1781, she decided on the advice of Frederick the Great that the crown prince should marry a Prussian princess.

Her ally and brother-in-law Frederick the Great warned her in 1783;

"I, the loyal friend of my incomparable queen, ask and implore you to beware and keep an eye upon a party, which I suspect are now in Denmark, and especially upon those surrounding your grandson, so that his innocent heart will not be affected by intriguers. I long for, I admit, for the day of his majority to pass without his mind having been corrupted by ambitious and vicious people. My dear queen may see, how this moment approaches, and I have no doubt that your wisdom and prudence will make you instigate precautions good enough to give you complete satisfaction."

=== Final years ===
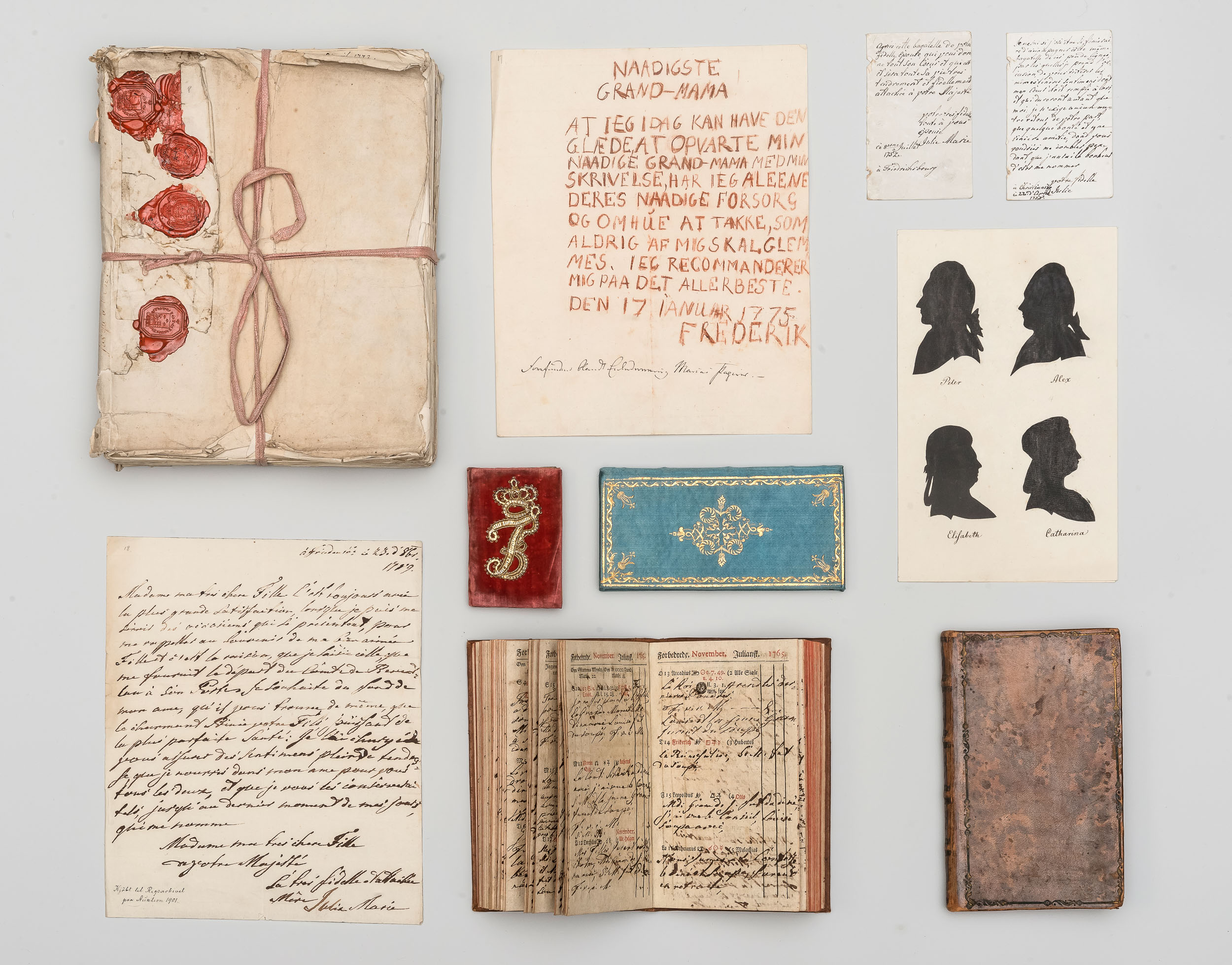
Juliane Marie's personal letters and recordings.

According to stipulations, the Crown Prince should be admitted to the royal regency council as soon as he reached legal majority after his confirmation. To prevent his admittance, Juliana Maria postponed his confirmation until after his sixteenth birthday in 1784. In preparation for the event, she also took the precaution to fill council with her followers.

In the spring of 1784, the Crown Prince had his confirmation and was declared of legal majority. Juliana Maria handed him a document with instructions of how he should rule. In the document, she instructed him to always rely on her advice, and stated that while until now, three people – the King, Prince Frederick and Juliana Maria – had been one, in the future four people must be one; referring to the King, Prince Frederick, the Crown Prince and her.

The Crown Prince, however, had no intention to allow Juliana Maria and her son to continue their rule, and made contact with Bernstorff to prepare the ousting of the government of 1772. He managed to make his insane father sign an order dismissing the supporters of Juliana Maria from the council and declaring that no royal order was henceforth legal unless co-signed by the Crown Prince. On 14 April 1784, during his first session with the council, the Crown Prince dismissed all followers of Juliana Maria and her son from the council without prior warning and appointed his own followers to the offices, which in effect was a palace coup which discontinued the old regency in one blow. Juliana Maria was reportedly taken with great surprise by the 1784 coup, and "with some scenes between the Crown Prince, the Hereditary Prince and his mother, during which Juliane Marie voiced her offence and bitterness in a couple of temperamental words, it was all over." On the following courtly ball the same night, she and all the other people involved in the palace coup seemingly behaved as if nothing had happened.

In public, no discord was seen between Juliana Maria, her son and the Crown Prince Regent, and the peace of the royal house was outwardly kept. On 12 April 1784, Juliana Maria commented to Frederick the Great: "As I fear one may frighten your majesty with words of an incident, which indeed has taken us by surprise, as it came so unexpected, and which could have occurred in a less public manner, I have taken it as my duty to inform my incomparable king and dearest friend myself", upon which she assured him that the so-called palace coup was in fact a transference of power long planned by mutual agreement between herself, her son the Crown Prince, that she could not praise the kindness of the Crown Prince enough and:

"If he should but keep this feelings, and rule in accordance with good and admirable ideals, I shall be calm and with much satisfaction see the matter completely resolved, as, the crown prince having reached the age he is now, it is perfectly natural that he should rule things now. We have therefore always wished it, and trained that child thus during the last year."

When during the summer of 1784, the Crown Prince left for Frederiksberg Slot, while she was to spend her summer separated from the king at Fredensborg Palace, it was symbolically shown that the queen dowager was no longer to have anything more to do with the regency and care of the king and that she was to live the rest of her live quietly as a queen dowager and nothing more. Her dissatisfaction was voiced in a couple of letters, such as when she wrote to the court official E. Schack that she wished that he would find out "what loyalty, righteousness and truthfulness can expect for reward in this vile world", and in a letter to Frederick the Great, while expressing her satisfaction with her new quiet life, she added: "I am surprised by nothing after my experiences during 23 years in this Kingdom, and I have in truth learned the nature of the world and its inhabitants".

Juliana Maria lived the rest of her life quietly at court, resuming the life she had prior to 1772. In 1785, King Gustav III of Sweden suggested that she depose the Crown Prince Regent and retake the regency, but she declined. During her last years, she seemed to fear the events of the French Revolution, and voiced her fear that the fire of Christiansborg Palace in 1794 was due to revolutionary activities.

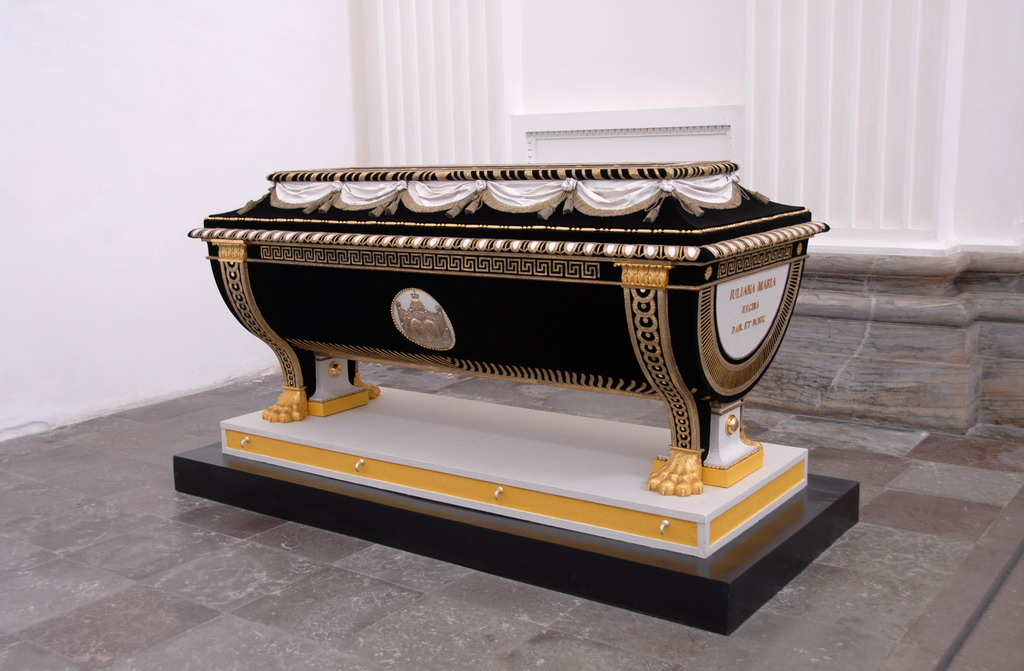
Sarcophagus of Juliana Maria in Roskilde Cathedral.

Juliana Maria died on 10 October 1796.

== Legacy ==
=== Namesakes ===
- Dronning Juliana Maria (1752 DAC ship)
- Dronning Juliana Maria (1775 DAC ship)
- Dronning Juliana Maria (1790 DAC ship)
- Dronning Juliana Maria (1780 DAC ship)

The Greenlandic town of Julianehaab ("Juliane's Hope") was named in her honour in 1775.

=== In fiction ===
Portrayed in literature:

- The Lost Queen (1969, historical novel) by Norah Lofts
- The Visit of the Royal Physician (Livläkarens besök) (1999, novel) by Per Olov Enquist

Portrayed in film:

- The Dictator, in which she is played by Helen Haye
- A Royal Affair, in which she is played by Trine Dyrholm

== Ancestry ==
Ancestors of Juliana Maria of Brunswick-Wolfenbüttel

8. Augustus II, Duke of Brunswick-Wolfenbüttel
4. Ferdinand Albert I, Duke of Brunswick-Wolfenbüttel-Bevern
9. Duchess Elisabeth Sophie of Mecklenburg-Güstrow
2. Ferdinand Albert II, Duke of Brunswick-Wolfenbüttel
10. Frederick, Landgrave of Hesse-Eschwege
5. Princess Christine of Hesse-Eschwege
11. Countess Palatine Eleonora Catherine of Kleeburg
1. Juliana Maria of Brunswick-Wolfenbüttel
12. Anthony Ulrich, Duke of Brunswick-Wolfenbüttel
6. Louis Rudolph, Duke of Brunswick-Wolfenbüttel
13. Princess Elisabeth Juliana of Schleswig-Holstein-Sonderburg-Norburg
3. Duchess Antoinette of Brunswick-Wolfenbüttel
14. Albert Ernest I, Prince of Oettingen-Oettingen
7. Princess Christine Louise of Oettingen-Oettingen
15. Duchess Christine Friederike of Württemberg

== Succession ==
Juliana Maria of Brunswick-Wolfenbüttel House of Brunswick-Bevern Cadet branch of the House of Welf Born: 4 September 1729 Died: 10 October 1796
Danish royalty
Vacant Title last held by Louise of Great Britain	Queen consort of Denmark and Norway; 1752–1766	Vacant Title next held by Caroline Matilda of Great Britain
