= Ørnen Rocks =

Group of rocks in the South Shetland Islands

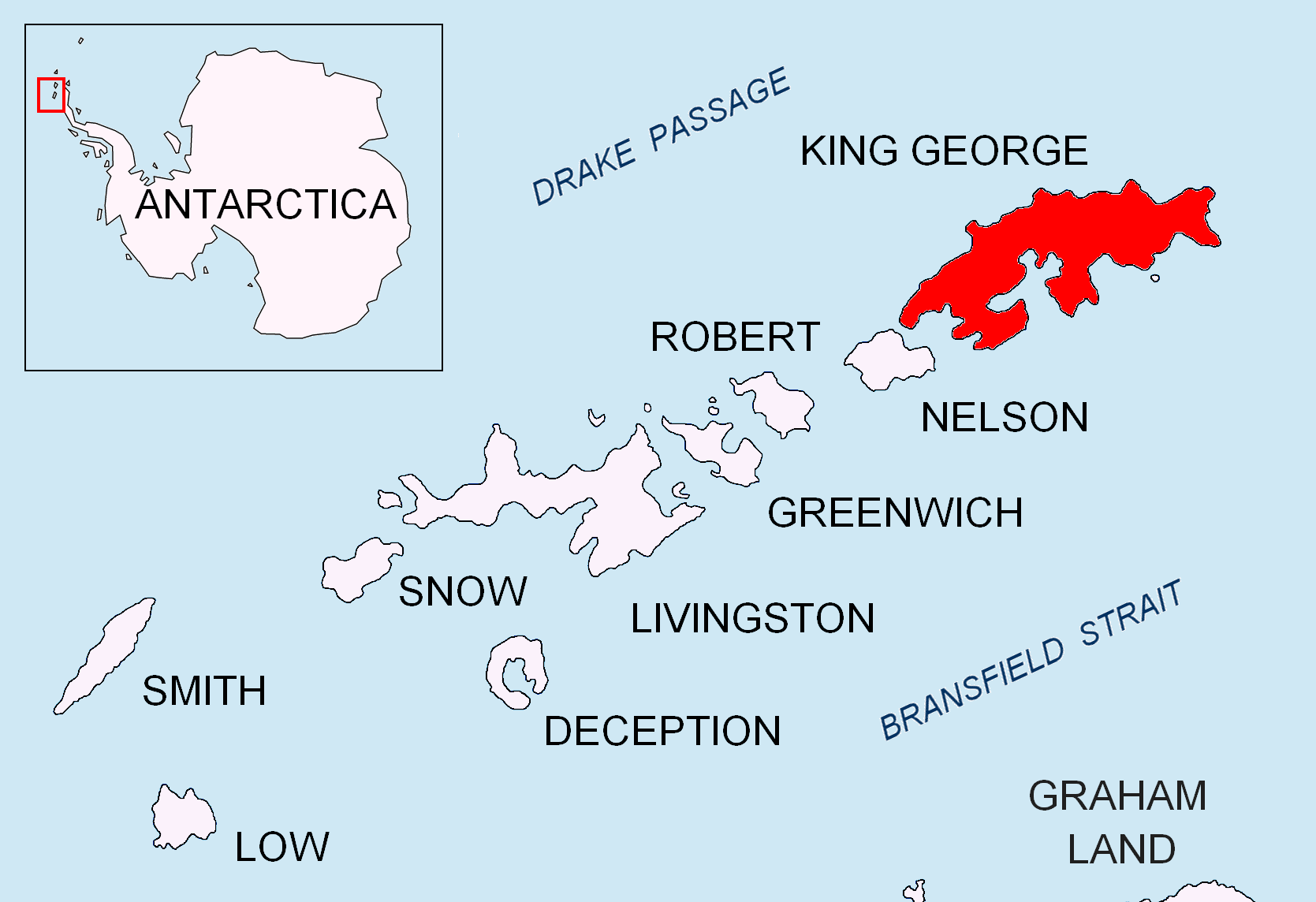
Location of King George Island in the South Shetland Islands.

Ørnen Rocks (62°1′S 57°35′W) is a partially submerged group of rocks in the South Shetland Islands, located 1 nautical mile (1.9 km) northeast of Cape Melville, King George Island. The rocks take their name from a Norwegian whaler by the name of Ørnen, who went aground on them in 1908 or 1909.
