= Dronning Juliana Maria (1790 DAC ship) =

Ship of the Danish Asiatic Company

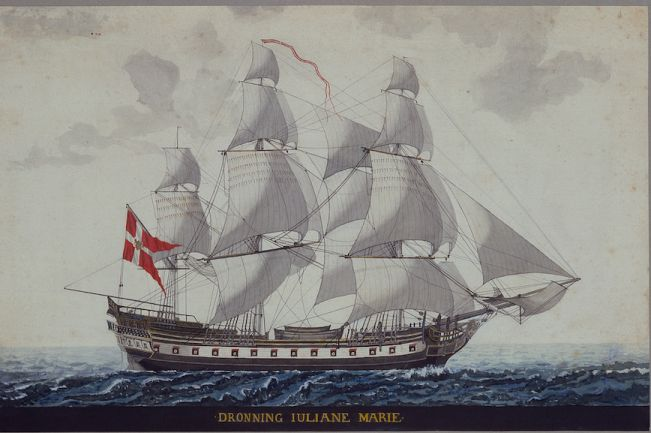
Dronning Juliana Maria.

Dronning Juliana Maria (also spelled Juliane Maria and Juliane Marie) was a trading ship of the Danish Asiatic Company, bought in Canton in 1790. She was bought as a replacement for another ship of the same name. Named after Juliana Maria of Brunswick-Wolfenbüttel.

== Origins ==
She was built in 1788 at Braintree, Massachusetts. Her first name was Massachusetts. She was bought by the Danish Asiatic Company in Canton in 1790 after Dronning Juliana Maria (built in Copenhagen in 1780), on 23–24 September, had wrecked in Chinese waters.. The name of her predecessor was subsequently transferred to the ship.

== DAC career ==
1790–91

She was captained by Jens Lassenius Kirksteen on the voyage back to Copenhagen. The ship's log book covers the period 19 November 1789 – 8 July 1791.

1791–1793

Dronning Juliana Maria was captained by Henrik August Schultz on her next expedition to Danish India in 1791–1793. Her travel pass (afgangspas) was issued in November 1791. She arrived at Tranquebar in May 1792. She later continued to Serampore. She set sail from Serampore in January 1792.

1794–1795

She was captained by Christian Lemming on her next expedition to Danish India. Her travel pass was issued in April 1794. She reached Tranquebar in October. She set sail from Tranquebar in February 1795, bound for Copenhagen. The log book covers the period 29 March 1804 – 28 July 1795. Rwo of Otto Christian Stricker's sons were sent back to Copenhagen with the ship. Former governor Morten Mortensen Færoe returned to Copenhagen onboard the ship in 1724.

== Fate ==
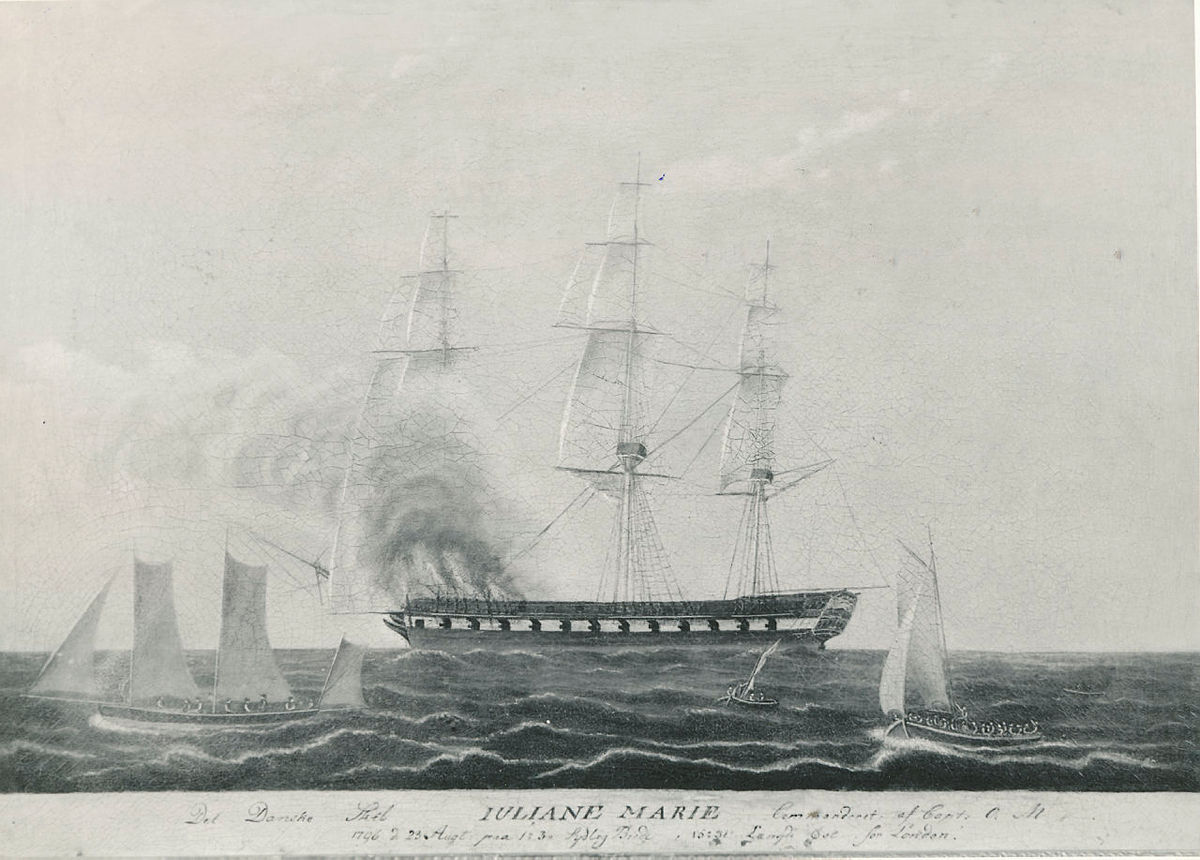
Dronning Juliana Maria on fire in the Bay of Bengal.

In 1795, she was sold at auction in Copenhagen. The buyer was Blacks Enke & Co. Capt. Christian Madsen set sail from Copenhagen on 10 July 1795, bound for Tranquebar. On 20 April 1796, Dronning Juliana Maria caught fire and sank in the Bay of Bengal.
