= Dronning Juliana Maria (1752 DAC ship) =

1752 Danish Chinaman ship

Dronning Juliana Maria was a Chinaman of the Danish Asiatic Company, built in 1752. She sailed on six expeditions to Canton. She was later followed by two other DAC ships with the same name. Named after Juliana Maria of Brunswick-Wolfenbüttel.

== Construction ==
Dronning Juliana Maria was built at the Danish Asiatic Company's own dockyard to a design by Anders Thuresen and Frederik Michael Krabbe. She was the 10th ship built at Asiatisk Plads. She was named for Queen Juliana Maria, Frederick V's second consort, whom he had just married.

== Career ==
1753-1754

Dronning Juliana Maria was captained by Henrik Fæster on her first expedition to Canton. Tasmus Alling served as chief mate (overstyrmand). The ship's protocol (kept by Fester) covers the period 27 February 1753 – 13 July 1754. Peter Fenger served as 1st supercargo on the expedition in spite of the fact that he had no previous DAC experience. Morten Engelbrecht Mouritzen served as chief assistant (overassistent). He would later become the DAC trader with most expeditions to Vanton.

1754-1756

Dronning Juliana Maria was captained by Svend Fenger on her second expedition to Canton. The company traders included Jacob Lindberg (1st supercargo), Jean Macculoch (2nd supercargo) and Poul Zeuften (supercargo). The ship's protocol (kept by Fenger) covers the period 20 November 1754 – 1 August 1756.

1757-1759

She was again captained by Svend Fenger on her third expedition. Mouritzen was now back on the ship, now with rank of 3rd supercargo. Marcus Christian Svendsen served as 1st supercargo.

Herman Friderich Hinckel started his DAC career on the expedition, as a company trader, with rank of junior assistant /underassistent).

1760-1761

Dronning Juliana Maria was captained by Peter Holm on her expedition to Canton in 1760–61. The ship's protocol covers the period 1 February 1760 – 21 July 1761.

Herman Friderich Hinckel was again on board the ship with rank of junior assistant.

1762-1764

She sailed on her fifth expedition to Canton in 1763–64. The ship's protocol (21 December 1762 – 16 June 1764) was kept by master (styrmand) Børre Sand.

1764-1766

She sailed from Copenhagen on 20 December 1764. The company traders included Hans Jensen Vestergaard (1st supercargp) and Jens Østrup (2nd supercargo). The ship called at Tranquebar on 21 January 1765. Michael Frederik Thede was possibly a passenger on this first leg of the voyage. He is, however, both listed in the roll book of Dronning Juliana Maria and Grevinde Moltke. It is therefore not clear with which of the ships he travelled to Tranquebar.

== Fate ==
On 16 January 1766, Dronning Juliana Maria was sold at auction in Copenhagen.
